= Ottoman Army (1861–1922) =

1861–1922 land warfare branch of the Ottoman Empire's military

Modern Ottoman Army
- Turkish: Modern Osmanlı Ordusu
- Active: 1826 – 1922
- Country: Ottoman Empire
- Allegiance: Ottoman Sultan
- Type: Army
- Size: ~3,156,000 est. (1914–1918)
- Garrison/HQ: Constantinople
- Engagements: Crimean War; Russo-Turkish War (1877–1878); Greco-Turkish War (1897); Balkan Wars; Tripolitanian War; World War I; Battle of Gallipoli; Siege of Kut; Arab Revolt; Balkans Campaign; Romanian Campaign; Greco-Turkish War (1919–1922)

Commanders
- Sultan: Abdulaziz (1861–1876); Abdulhamid II (1876–1908); Mehmed V (1908–1918); Mehmed VI (1918–1922)
- Notable commanders: Ahmed Izzet Pasha; Ismail Enver Pasha

The Ottoman Army was the military land force of the Ottoman Empire after the country was reorganized along modern western European lines during the Tanzimat modernization period. In 1826, Sultan Mahmud II abolished the Janissary Corps, which had existed for centuries but was unable to adapt to modern military tactics and frequently rebelled. In its place, he established the Asakir-i Mansure-i Muhammediye (Victorious Soldiers of Prophet Muhammad) army that same year. The Sultan continued his reform efforts by establishing modern institutions to support the army. In 1826, he established the Seraskerlik, equivalent to a modern Ministry of Defense. In 1827, the first military medical school, Imperial School of Medicine, was opened to train doctors and surgeons for the army. In 1834, Harbiye Military School was opened with the support of French military instructors to train officers for the army.

On June 14, 1843, Sultan Abdülmecid changed the army's name to Asâkir-i Nizâmiye-i Şâhâne (Royal Regular Soldiers). From this date onward, the army began to be known simply as the Nizami Ordu (Regular Army). In 1845, he established Kuleli Military High School, the first modern military high school, in the capital Istanbul. In 1848, the first military academy, Erkan-ı Harbiye Military Academy, was opened to train army staff officers and high-ranking officers, or pashas. The Crimean War was the first war effort in which the modern army took part in, proving itself as a decent force. The last reorganization occurred during the Second Constitutional Era.

The uniforms of the modern army reflected the military uniforms of the western European countries who were the Ottoman army's principal advisors at the time. The Ottoman government considered adopting a Western-style headdress for all personnel within the army, but the fez was favoured as it was more suited to the postures of the Islamic ritual prayer.

French-style uniform and court dress were common during the early stage of the Tanzimat period. After the French defeat in the Franco-Prussian War, the Ottoman government searched for other role models, so German- and British-style uniforms became popular. During World War I, the officer uniforms were mainly based on those of the Ottoman's German allies.

== Establishment of the modern army ==
The shift from the Classical Army (1451–1606) took more than a century and began with the failed attempts of Selim III (r. 1789–1807) and Alemdar Mustafa Pasha (1789–1808), continued through a period of Ottoman Military Reforms (1826–1858) and finally concluded during the reign of Abdul Hamid II (r. 1876–1909). As early as 1880, Abdul Hamid sought German assistance, which he secured two years later, culminating in the appointment of Lieutenant Colonel Otto Köhler. Although the consensus was that Abdul Hamid II favored the modernization of the Ottoman army and the professionalization of the officer corps, it seems that he neglected the military during the last fifteen years of his reign, evidenced by his military budget cuts. The formation of the modern Ottoman army proved a slow process with period of inconsistent progression.

=== Modernization of the Imperial Ottoman Army and Navy ===
==== 1842–1861 ====
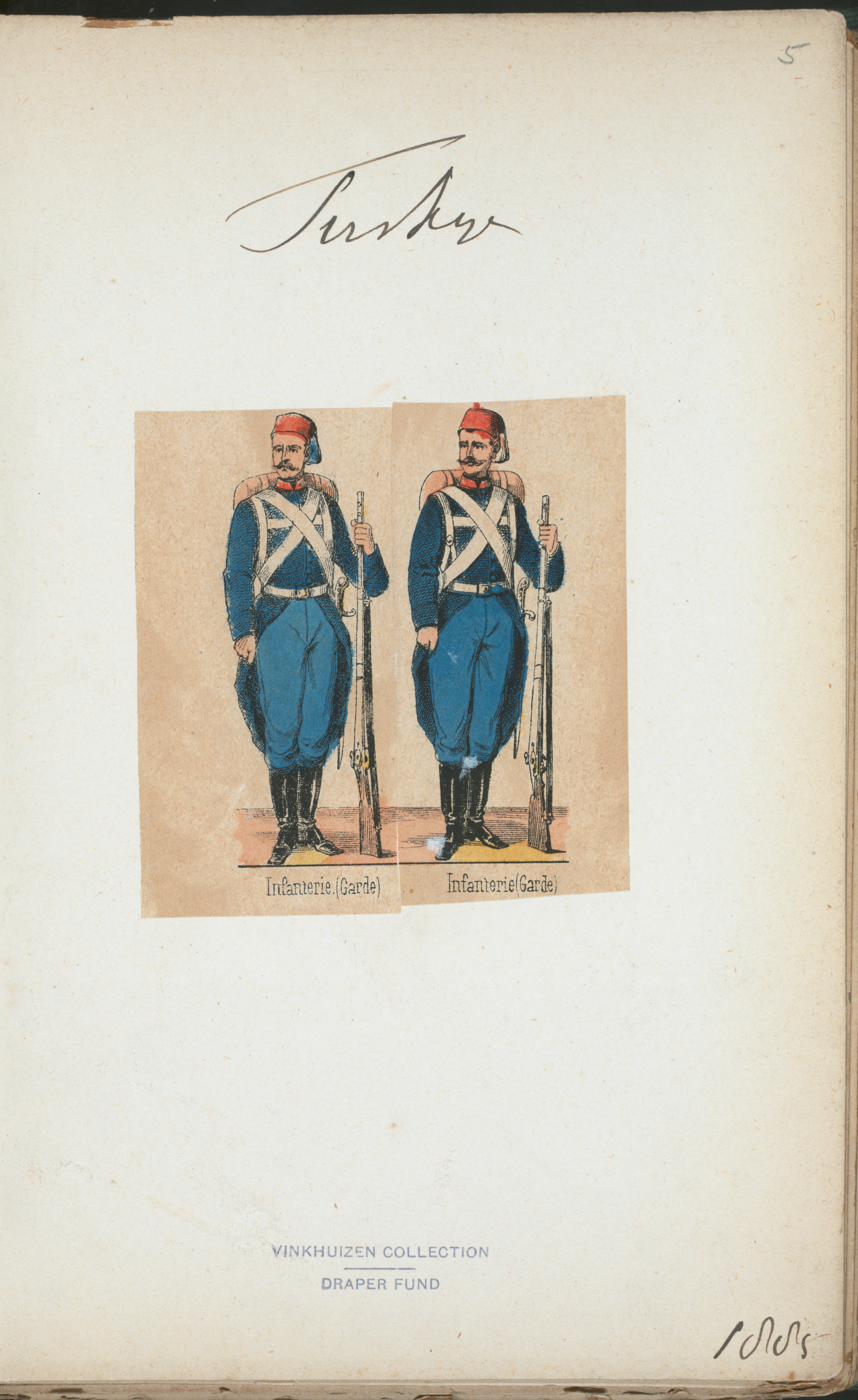
Resembling the French line-infantry uniform

French-inspired palace guard dress

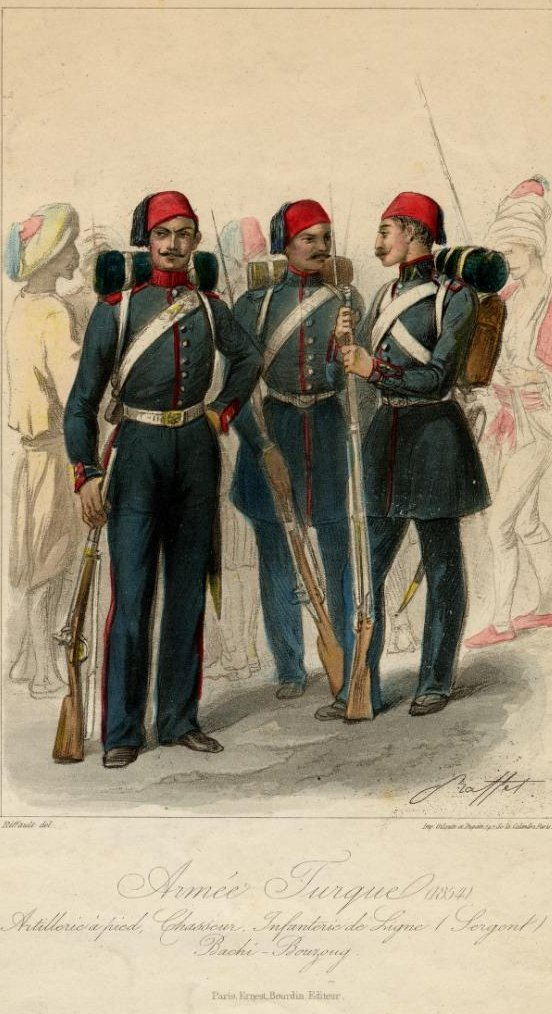
Ottoman soldiers, 1854

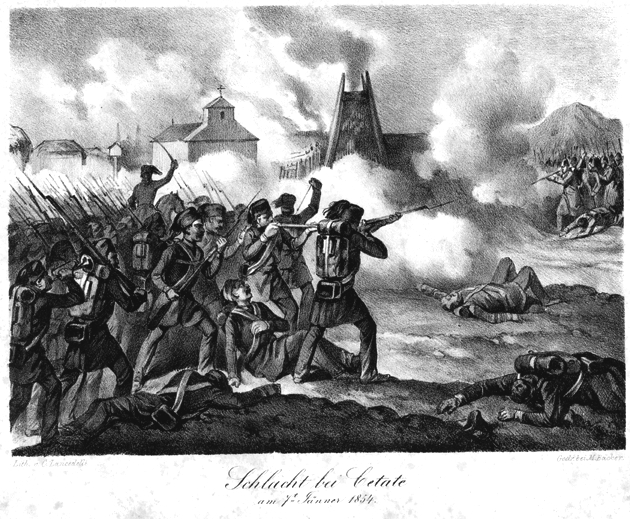
Ottoman and Russian forces during the Battle of Cetate of 1853-1854

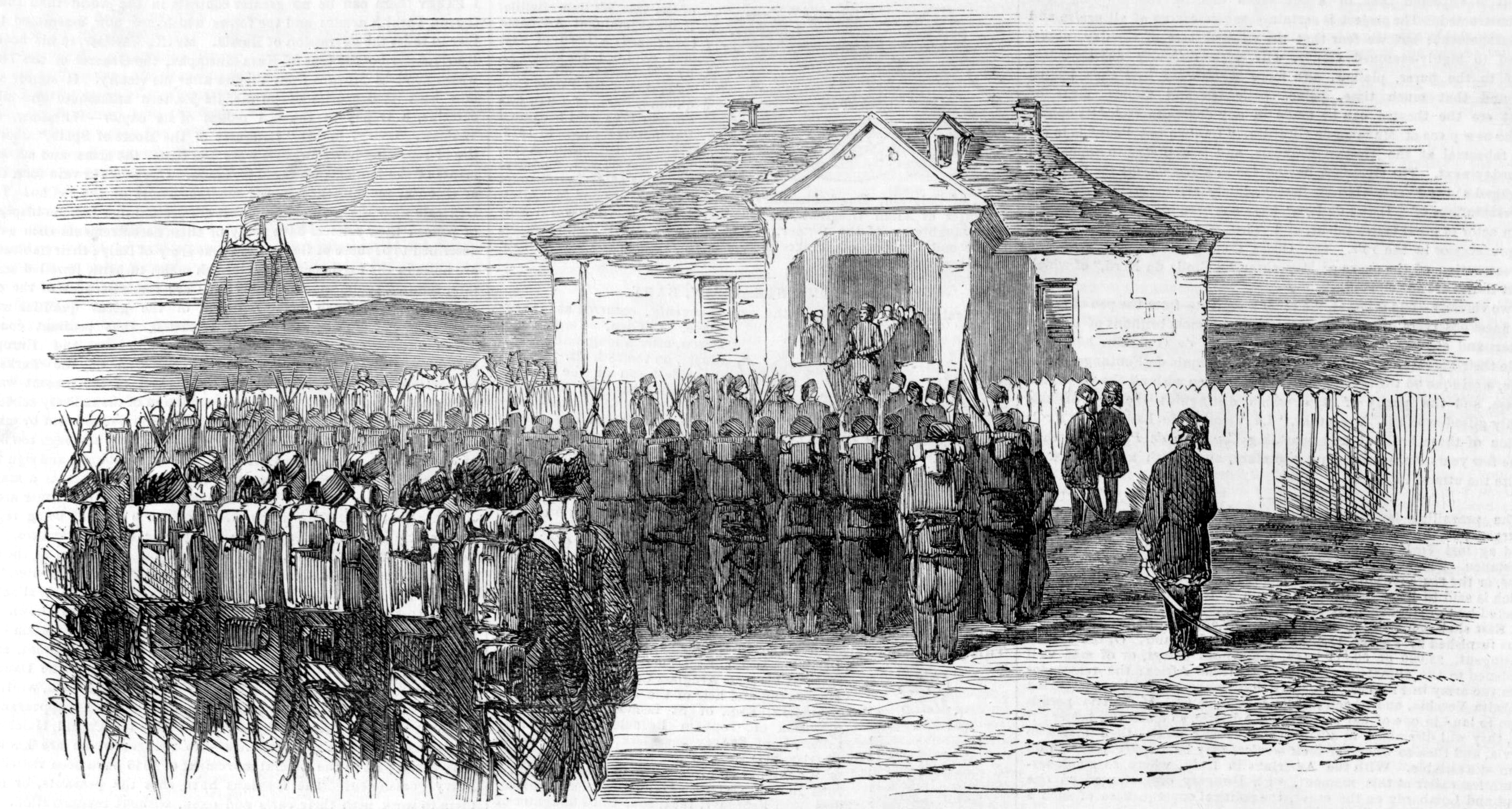
Distribution of the Medjidie, after the Battle of Cetate, 1854

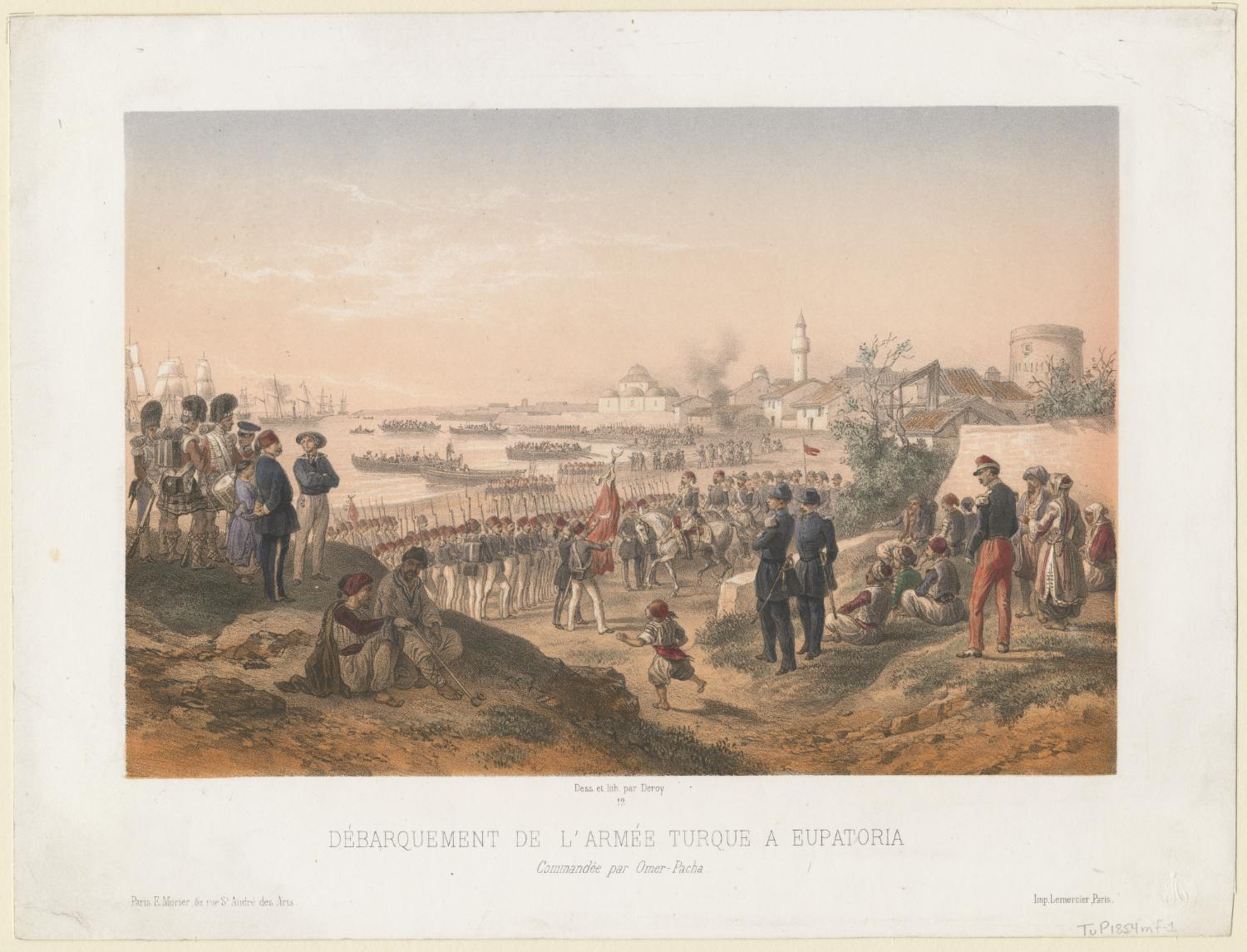
Landing of the Ottoman army at Eupatoria, E. Morier, 1855

==== 1861–1896 ====
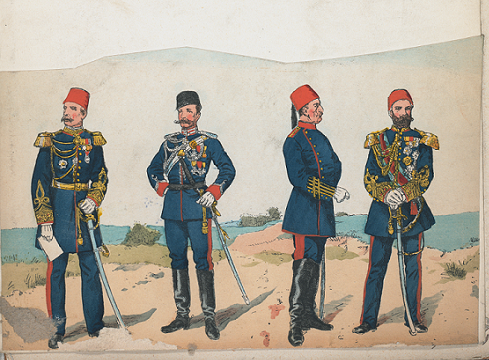
Resembling the Imperial German Army dunkelblau uniform

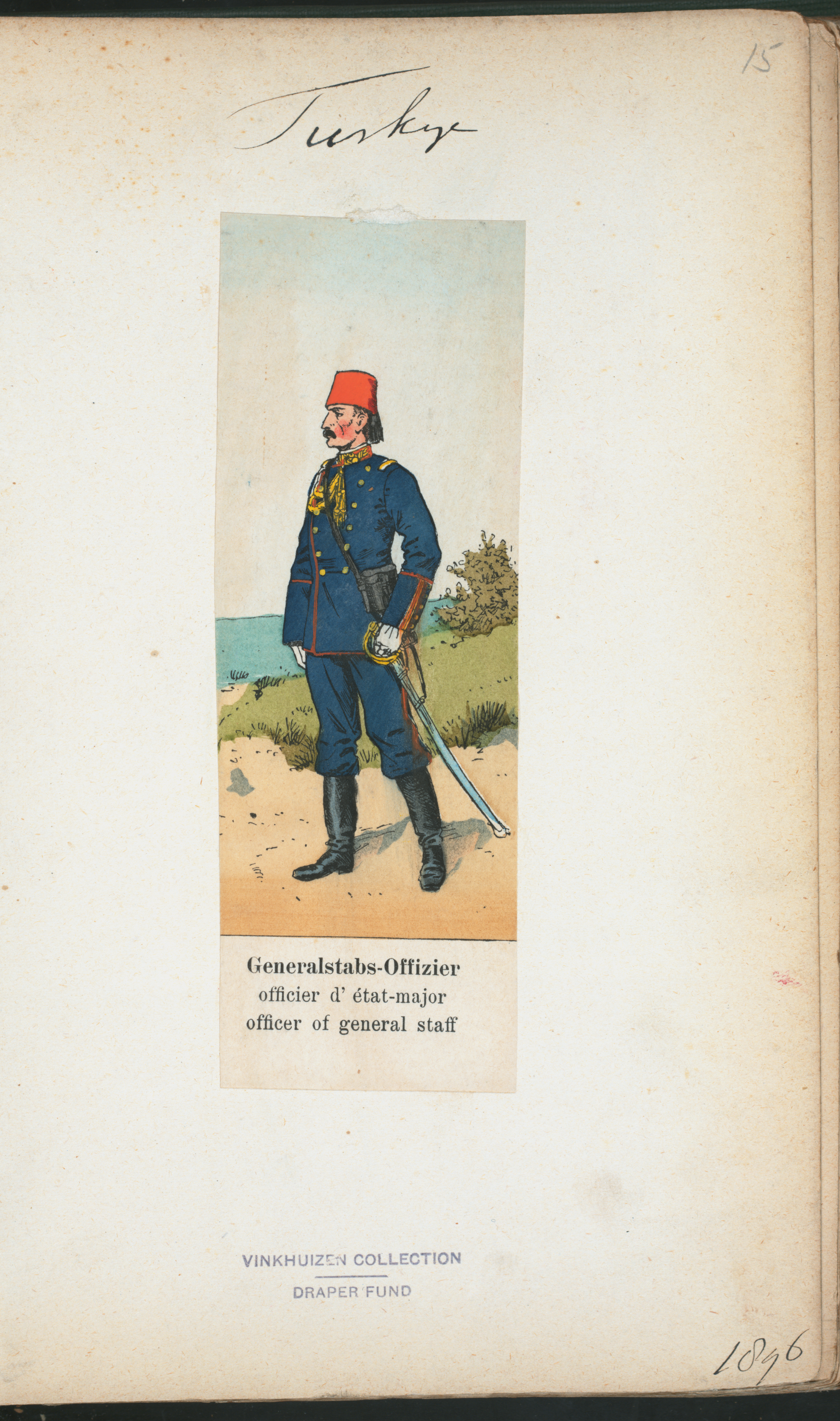
Officer of the general staff wearing the Imperial German Army dunkelblau uniform

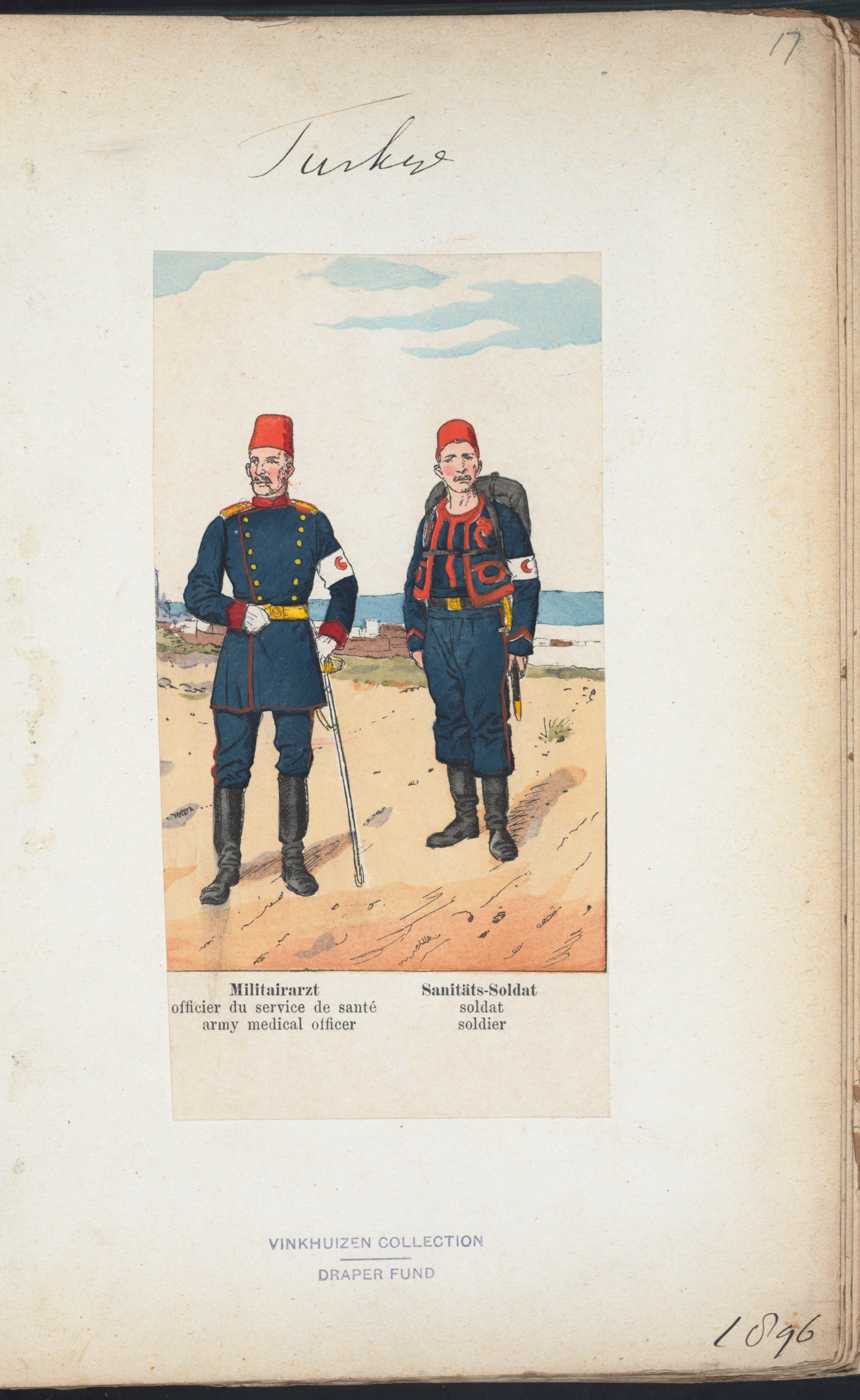
Note the French-inspired Zouave uniform on the right

German-inspired dunkelblau uniforms

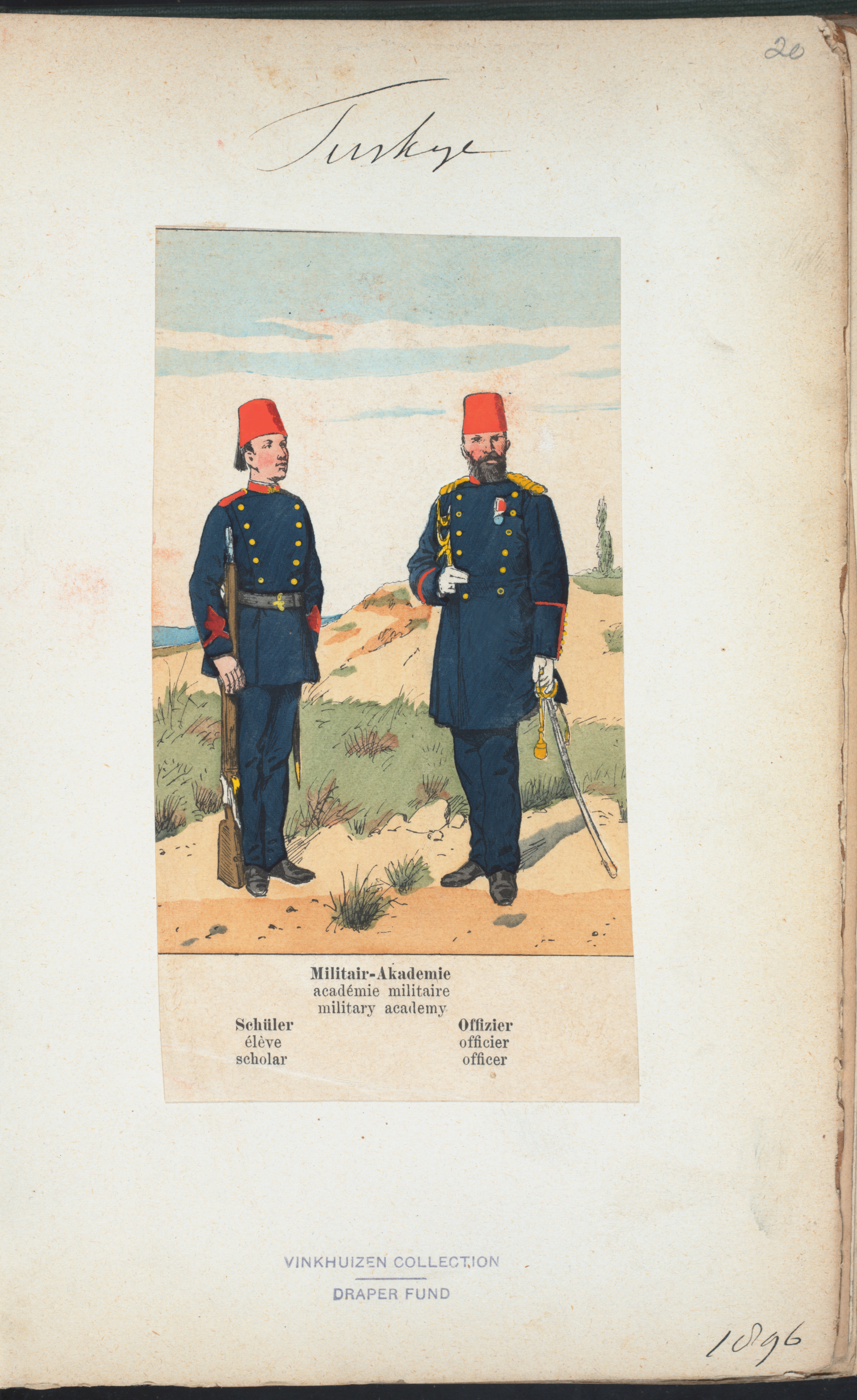
German-inspired dunkelblau uniforms

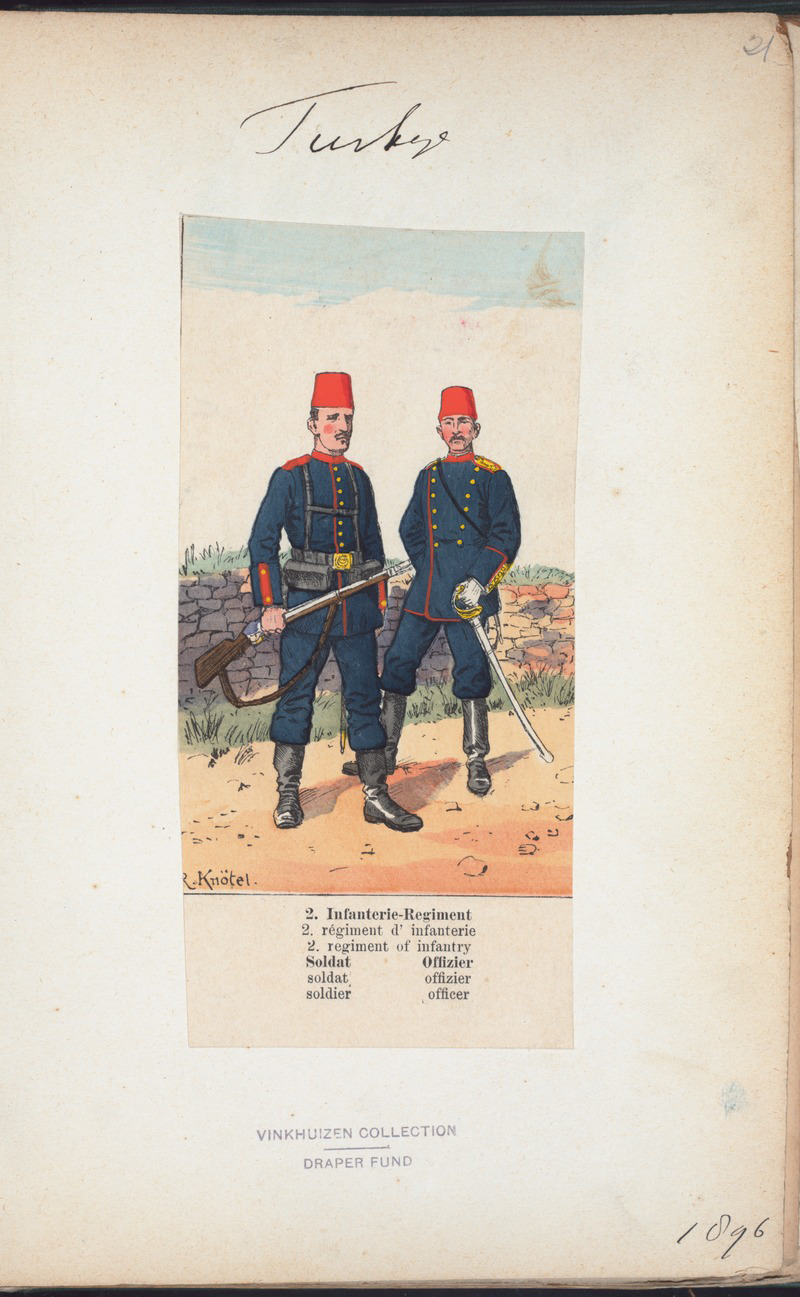
German-inspired dunkelblau uniforms

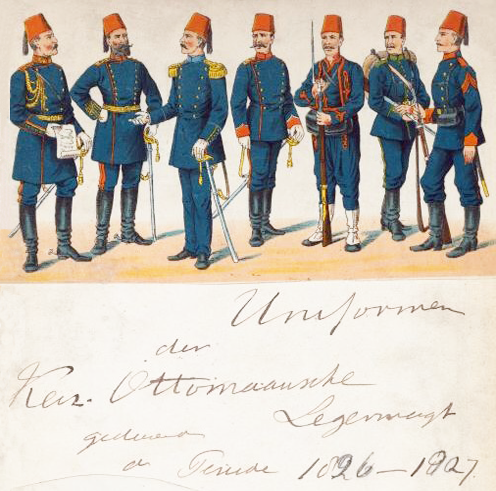
German-inspired dunkelblau uniforms, and a French-inspired Zouave uniform

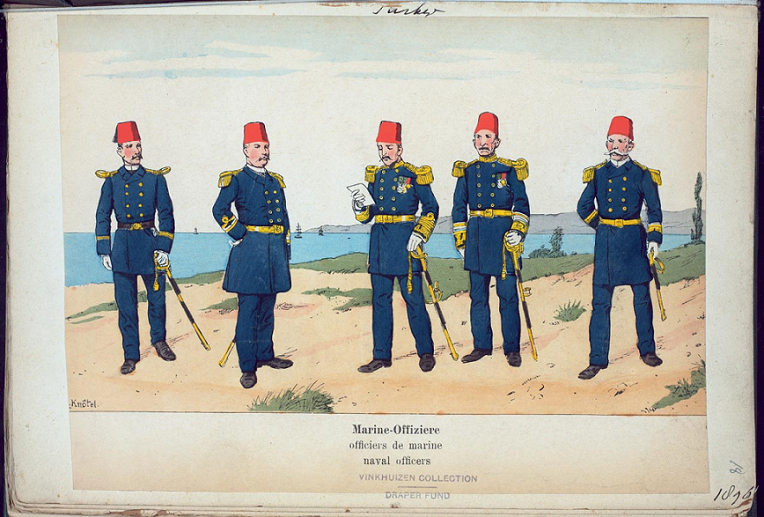
Resembling the Imperial German naval uniform

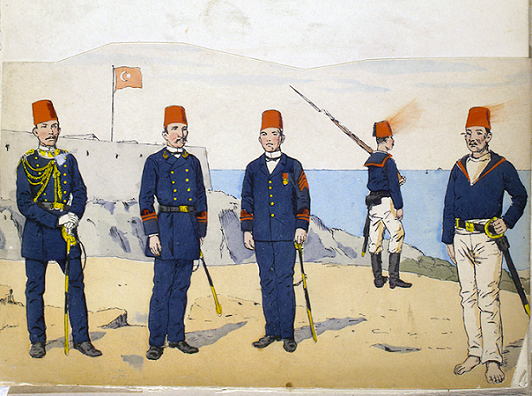
Resembling the Imperial German naval uniform

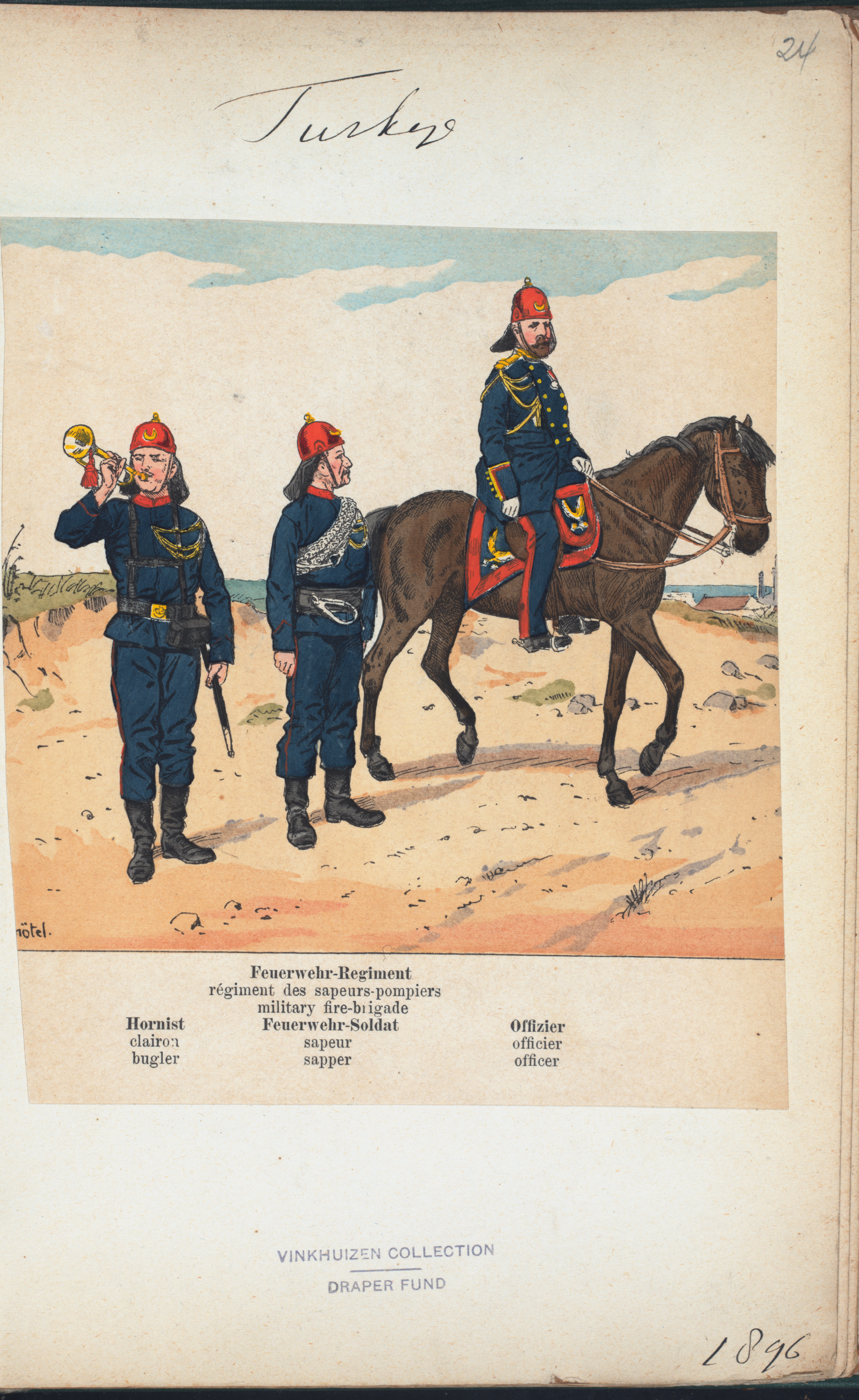
Fire-department personnel wearing the German dunkelblau uniform, and a variant of the fez which resembles the German Pickelhaube

Resembling the Prussian artillery uniform

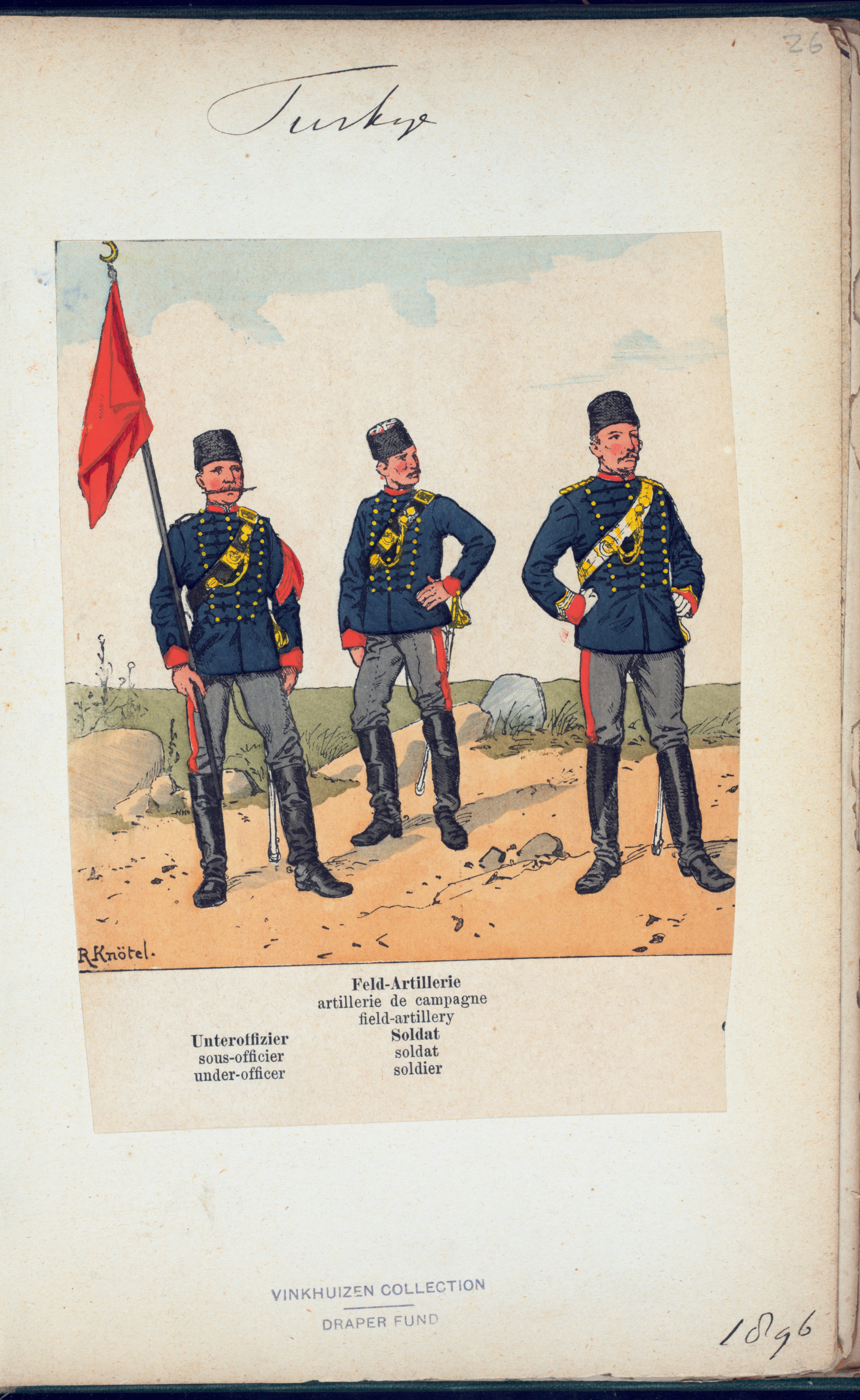
Resembling the Prussian artillery uniform

Resembling the Prussian Uhlan regiment uniform

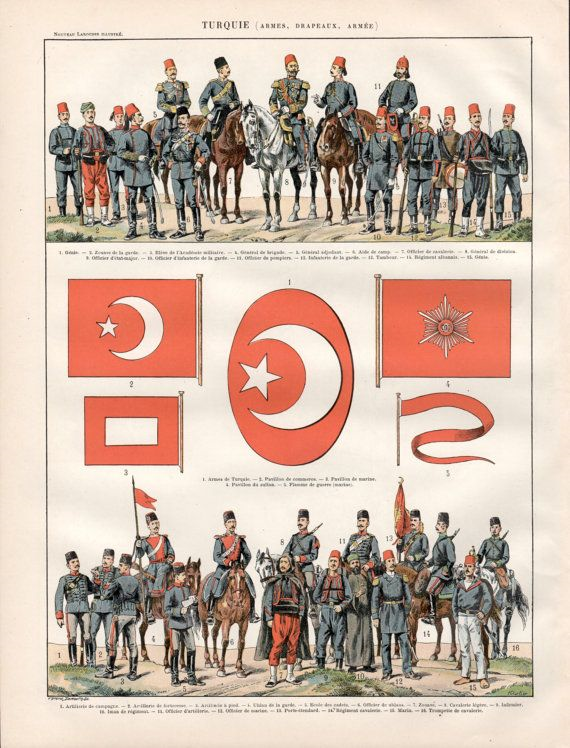
The Imperial Ottoman Army in 1900

== Units ==
=== Departments ===
==== Infantry Department ====
The Infantry Department, which occupied a significant position in the central military organization, was divided into four branches in the 1890 Askerî Salname and into a correspondence office (tahrirat kalemi) and four branches in the 1908 Devlet Salnamesi (State Yearbook). The administration of the department was chaired by a Müşir and consisted of two Birindji ferik and one Ferik.

Within the offices and branches of the Infantry Department, the staff included:

- Two Brigadier General (Mirliva)
- Two Colonel (Miralay)
- Two Lieutenant Colonel (Kaymakam)
- Two Major (Binbaşı)
- One Regimental Quartermaster (Alay Emini)

The department's aides-de-camp (yaver) included officers at the ranks of one Senior Captain (Kol Aghassi), four Captains (Yüzbaşı), and three Lieutenants (Mülazım). In addition to the military ranks, civil servants served in the department with the following administrative grades: one Ulâ (Note: A high-level administrative grade in the late Ottoman civil service bureaucracy (Rütbe-i Mülkiye).), eight Ulâ-i Sani (Note: Second degree of the Ulâ administrative grade, equivalent to the military rank of Brigadier General (Mirliva).), three Mütemayiz (Note: A distinguished administrative grade in the Ottoman civil service, equivalent to the military rank of Colonel (Miralay).), and five Sâniye (Note: A second-class administrative grade in the Ottoman civil service, equivalent to the military rank of Lieutenant Colonel (Kaymakam).).

The Infantry Department was responsible for all administrative procedures regarding the infantry, which formed the backbone of the Ottoman Army. The department maintained the identification registers (künye) of all infantry regiments, as well as the fire brigade and industrial regiments in Dersaadet (Istanbul), including both officers and private soldiers. Its duties included managing the promotion and assignment processes of commanders (ümerâ) and officers, maintaining their service registers (sicil), preparing reports (mazbata) for the awarding of officers or civil servants within the department for imperial submission, and executing these procedures upon the Sultan's decree. Furthermore, the department was tasked with examining the reports (layiha) submitted by inspectors concerning the infantry branch and preparing subsequent evaluations. It was also responsible for the admission of applicants to the Ottoman Military Academy and overseeing efforts to improve the training of existing students. Other responsibilities included reviewing books written on the infantry branch, recording submitted proposals, and examining reports regarding reforms in the uniforms, weaponry, and equipment of the infantry. The department prepared reform programs based on approved changes and implemented the decisions made by infantry commissions. Additionally, it monitored the application of existing laws during the recruitment process and oversaw the distribution of soldiers collected through the lottery system (kura) into their respective classes. The department also managed the identification registers of commanders, officers, and soldiers of the Redif (Reserve) and Müstahfız (Home Guard) forces, conducting inspections and directing the necessary procedures for their mobilisation.

==== Cavalry Department ====
The cavalry department, a key administrative body, was controlled by the General Staff, similar to the infantry department. The 1889 askerî salname shows that the department started with two branches, each managed by a ferik and a civilian. By 1908, the administrative framework had expanded to include a cavalry commission and two branches, staffed by two feriks and a high-ranking civil servant (ula-i sani). A significant part of this department was the "Çiftlikat-ı Hümayun", which managed various state-operated agricultural holdings. These included the Çifteler, Hamra, Sultan, Çukurova, and Veziriye farms. The Ottomans used these farms to meet the livestock needs of their cavalry.

The department's personnel strength comprised a diverse mix of military and civilian ranks; specifically, its commissions and branches were staffed by one ferik, two miralays, one kaymakam, three majors, two kolağası, and a captain, alongside several civil servants holding the ranks of evvel-i sâniye, sâniye, and mütemayiz. The department's main administrative duty involved managing the detailed identification records, called 'künye', for all personnel in the cavalry and remount units, from high-ranking officers (ümerâ) to enlisted soldiers. Furthermore, the department was tasked with the oversight of trainees and personnel at the cavalry training institutions and the cavalry branch of the Ottoman Military Academy. Its executive duties extended to the preparation of official reports regarding promotions, retirement plans, and military decorations for both civilian and uniformed members of the branch. These recommendations were forwarded to the Serasker for assessment, and subsequent to the Sultan's issuance of imperial decrees, the department oversaw the ultimate implementation and documentation of these administrative measures.

Furthermore, the department's purview encompassed logistics and procurement operations. It administered the operational accounts and animal breeding research of state-owned farms, thereby guaranteeing the availability of superior livestock for military applications. In the context of animal procurement, the department bore responsibility for upholding the integrity of the tendering process, thereby mitigating the potential for corruption. Additionally, it oversaw the supply of harnesses and related equipment for all military classes. In preparation for war or mobilisation, the department maintained detailed census records of privately owned animals to facilitate local requisitioning when necessary. The department's regulatory authority also included the vetting of training manuals and legal frameworks for both the regular (Nizamiye) cavalry and the Hamidiye light cavalry regiments.

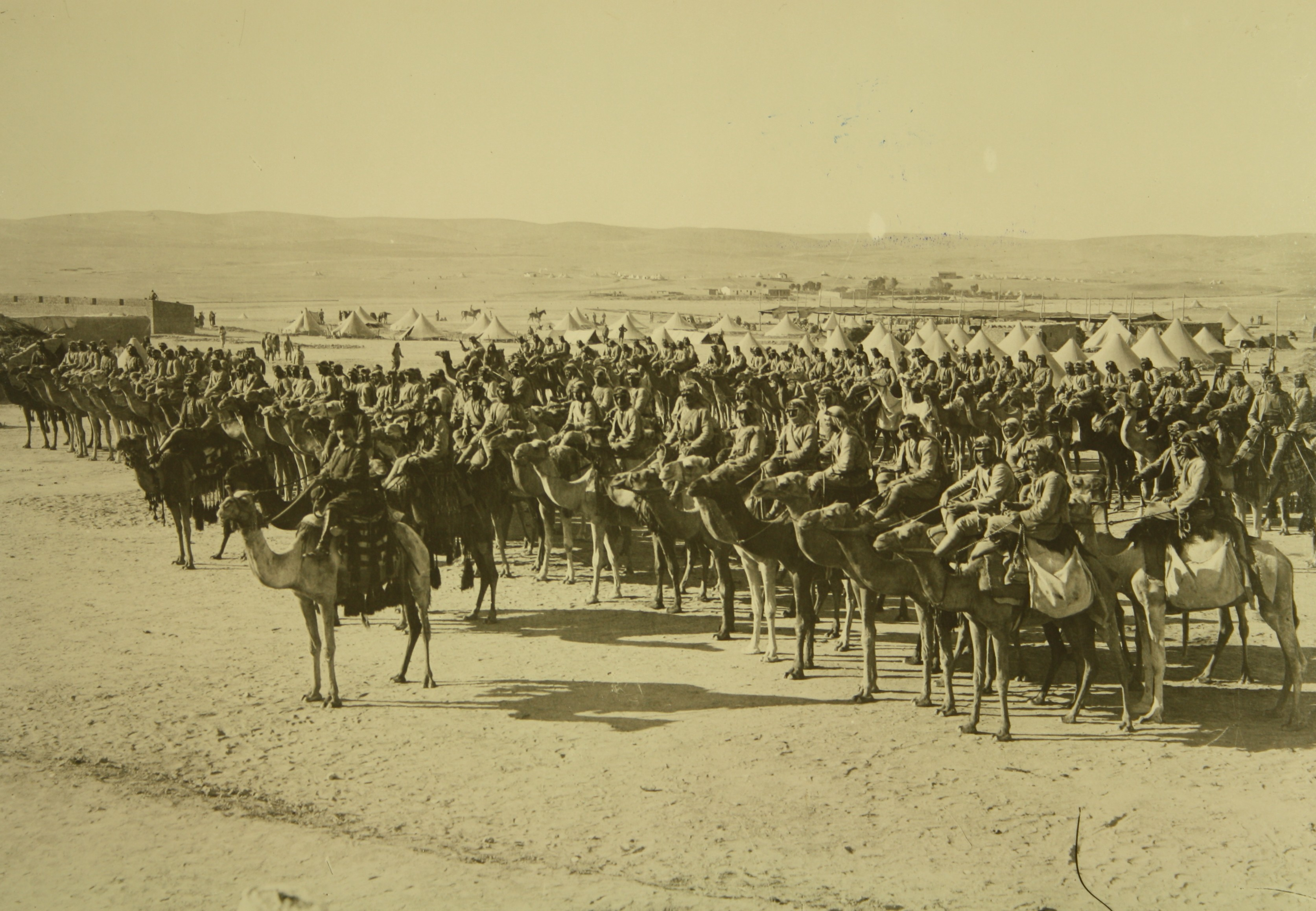
An Ottoman cavalry unit during the later years of the empire.

While the strategic importance of cavalry diminished during the late 19th century, the organisational structure persisted through the transition into the early 20th century. By the empire's final years, the cavalry force was reorganised into three primary divisions (1st, 2nd, and 3rd Cavalry Divisions), which largely replaced the earlier Hamidiye formations after their 1910 dissolution. These modernised units were restructured into seven brigades and three independent regiments, primarily consisting of personnel recruited from Kurdish and rural Ottoman populations.

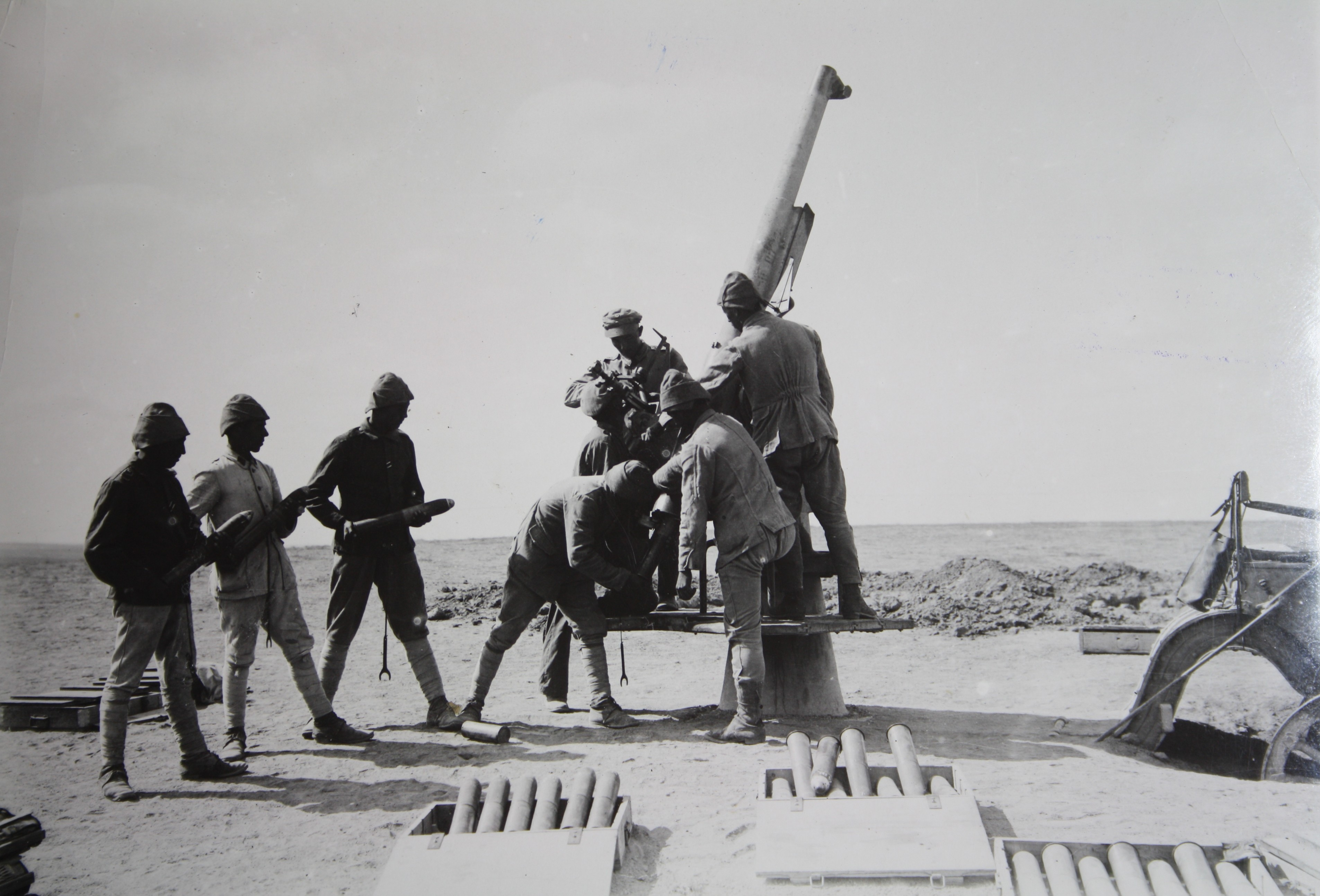
Ottoman anti-aircraft cannon WWI

==== Artillery Department ====
Following the administrative shifts necessitated by the War of 1877–78, the Artillery Department underwent a significant reorganisation to centralise the management of the regular artillery corps. The department's executive leadership typically consisted of a brigadier general serving as the director, supported by an administrative staff of two additional brigadier generals, a major general, and a senior clerk. Structurally, the department was divided into two primary branches and a specialised clerical office. By 1908, the department's staffing reflected a hybrid military-civilian framework; its military personnel included a major general and a lieutenant colonel, while the civilian bureaucracy was composed of eight officials across various ranks, including mütemayiz (distinguished) and several second and third-class officials.

The department was primarily responsible for the comprehensive personnel management of the artillery branch. This included maintaining identification registers (künye) for all personnel, ranging from regimental commanders and commissioned officers to enlisted soldiers. Beyond record-keeping, the department oversaw legal and professional rights, such as promotions, reassignments, retirements, and the issuance of decorations for both uniformed and civilian staff. Furthermore, it maintained the administrative files for students and faculty at artillery training schools, as well as the specialised records for master gunsmiths (tüfekçi ustaları) assigned to artillery regiments and battalions.

Operational and logistical oversight also constituted a core mandate of the department. It was tasked with reviewing inspection reports and formulating strategic proposals based on these findings. During both peacetime and mobilisation, the department monitored the inventory of weaponry, ammunition, and technical equipment, collaborating closely with commissions affiliated with the Artillery Inspectorate. It managed the requisition ledgers for production needs and coordinated the distribution of ordnance to active field armies. Additionally, the department held the authority to inspect military stockpiles directly or appoint expert officers to conduct technical audits. Throughout these operations, the Artillery Department functioned under the direct jurisdictional authority of the Chief of the General Staff.

Combatant branches

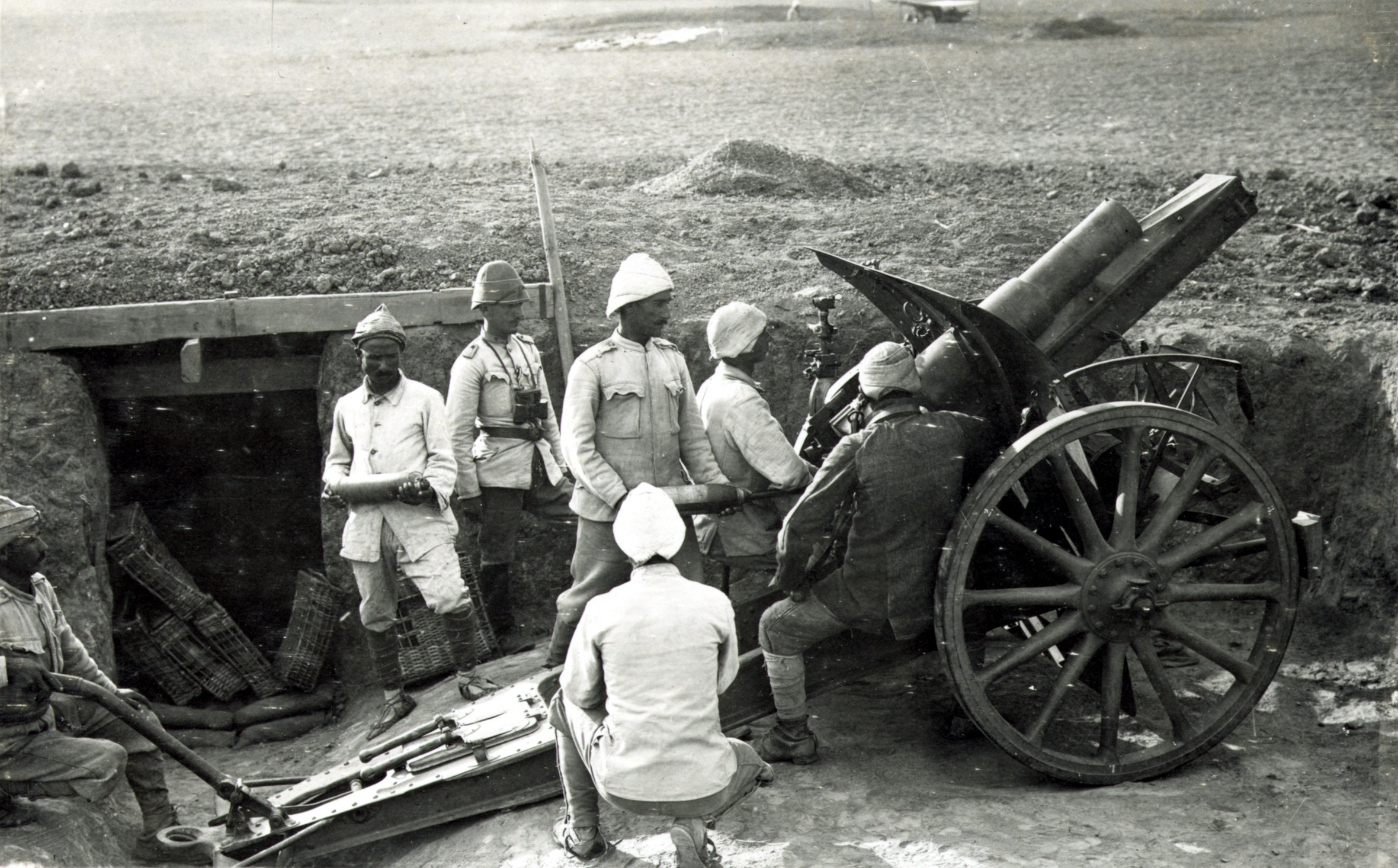
Artillery (Howitzer)

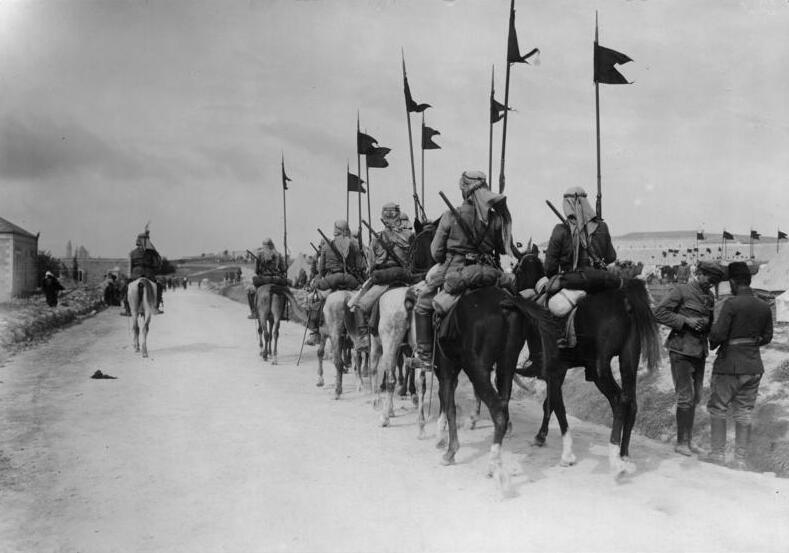
Cavalry (Horse)

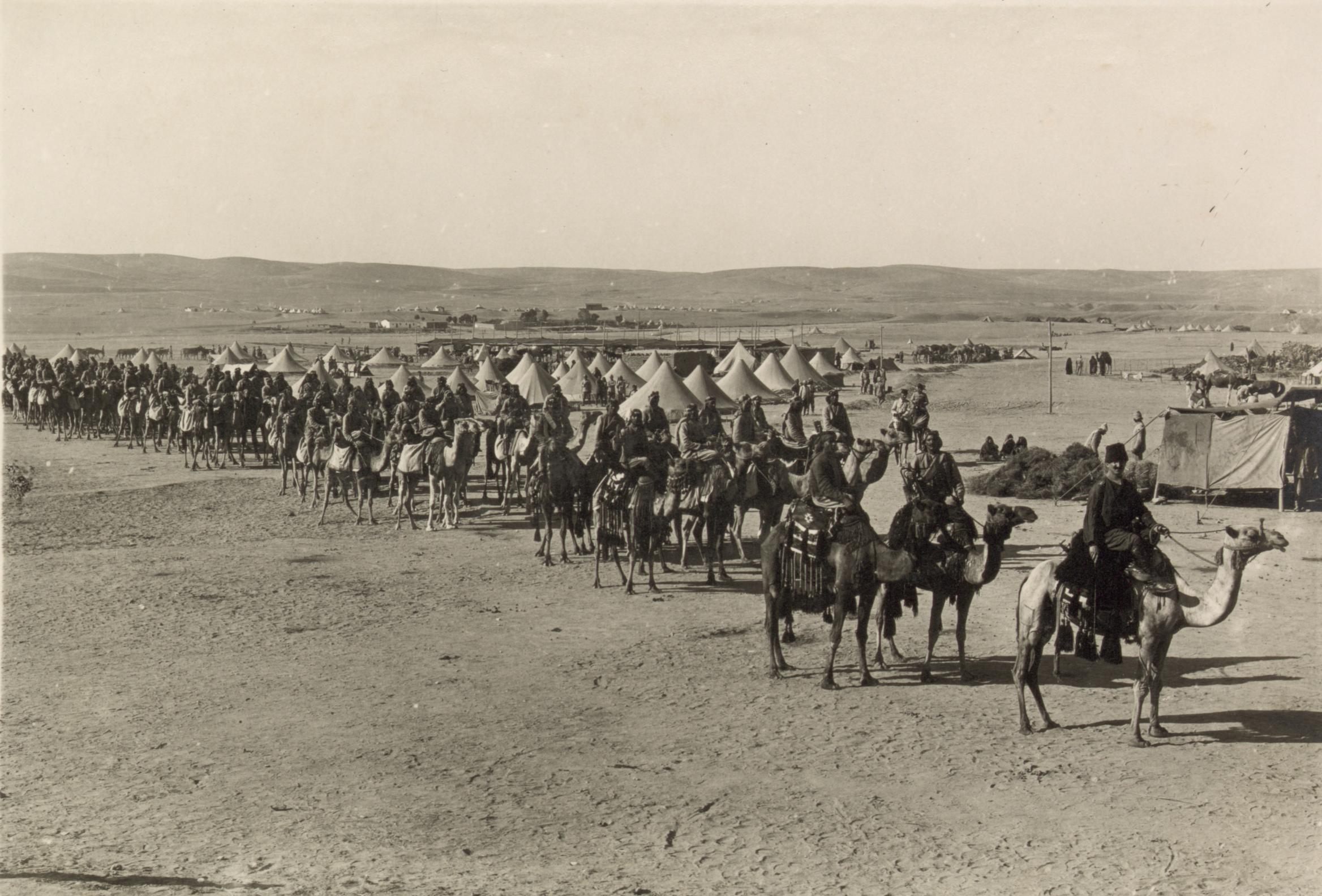
Cavalry (Camel)

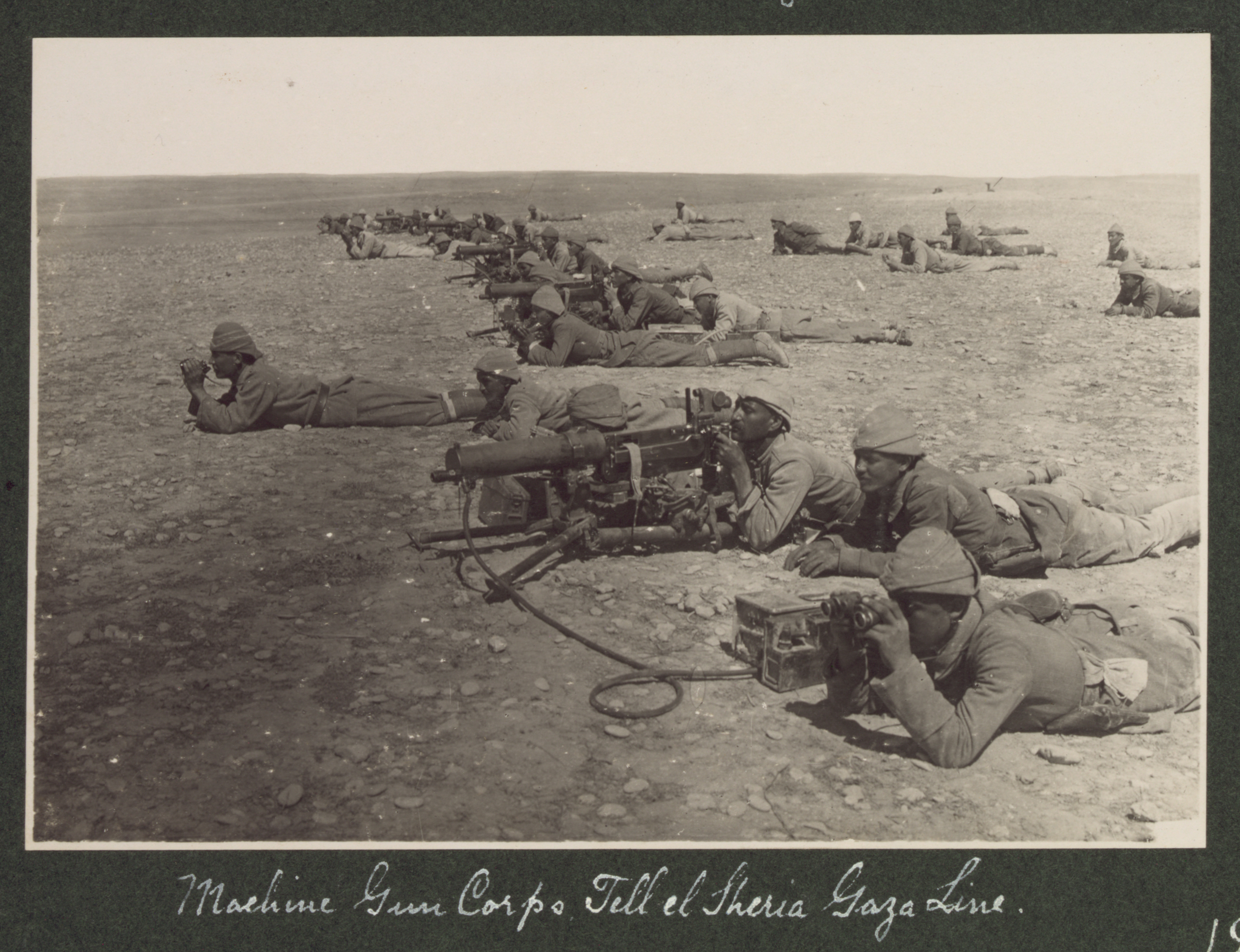
Machine gun

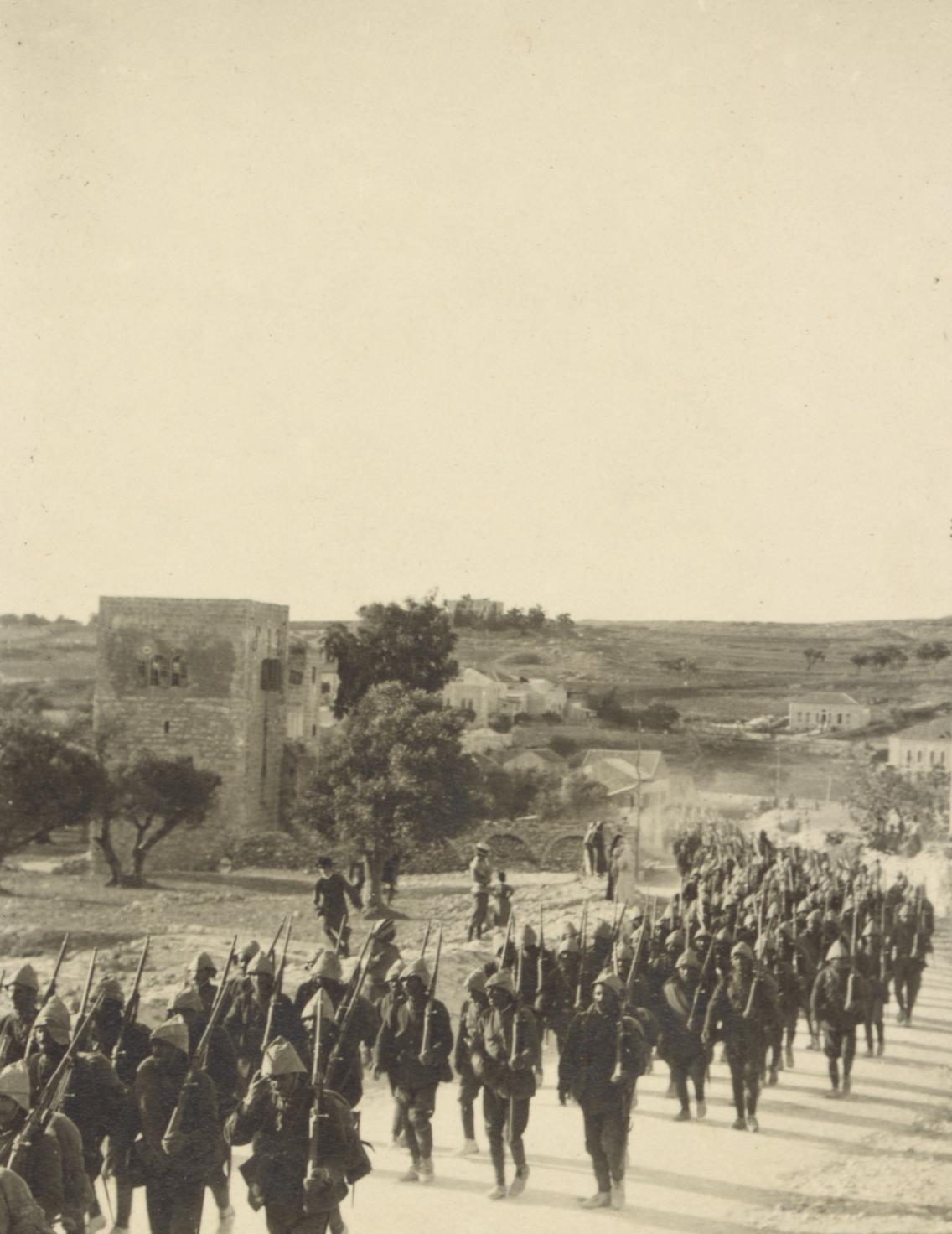
Infantry

=== Non-combatant branches ===
==== Engineering ====
Ottoman engineers had both offensive and defensive functions. They removed physical obstacles created by the enemy, repaired damaged bridges and facilities, and built bridges and other infrastructure to enable infantry operations. Engineers were also expected to create obstacles during retreats and to demolish infrastructure that could be used by the enemy. Each corps had an engineering battalion and each division had an engineering company.

==== Communication ====
The communication branch was established in 1882. Its designation was 'telegraph battalion' and its main function was to operate telegraphs. In 1910, the telephone was added to its functions. In 1911, wireless stations were added to the unit. A direct line between İzmir and Derne was established for the first time in 1911, during the Italo-Turkish War. Beginning in 1912 with the Balkan Wars, every corps level unit had a 'telegraph battalion.'

==== Medical ====
The medical branch does not have a precise date of origin. During 1908, the second constitutional period, its structure included doctors, surgeons, veterinarians, pharmacists, dentists, chemists, wound-dressers and nurses. They were organized by the Health Department of the Ministry of War.

==== Military bands ====
Since the early days of the Ottoman Army, each regiment has had its own band. In 1908, during the second constitutional period, there were 35 military bands in the capital. Each army had two bands. The “Imperial Band” (mızıka-i humayun) consisted of 90 musicians.

Non-combatant branches

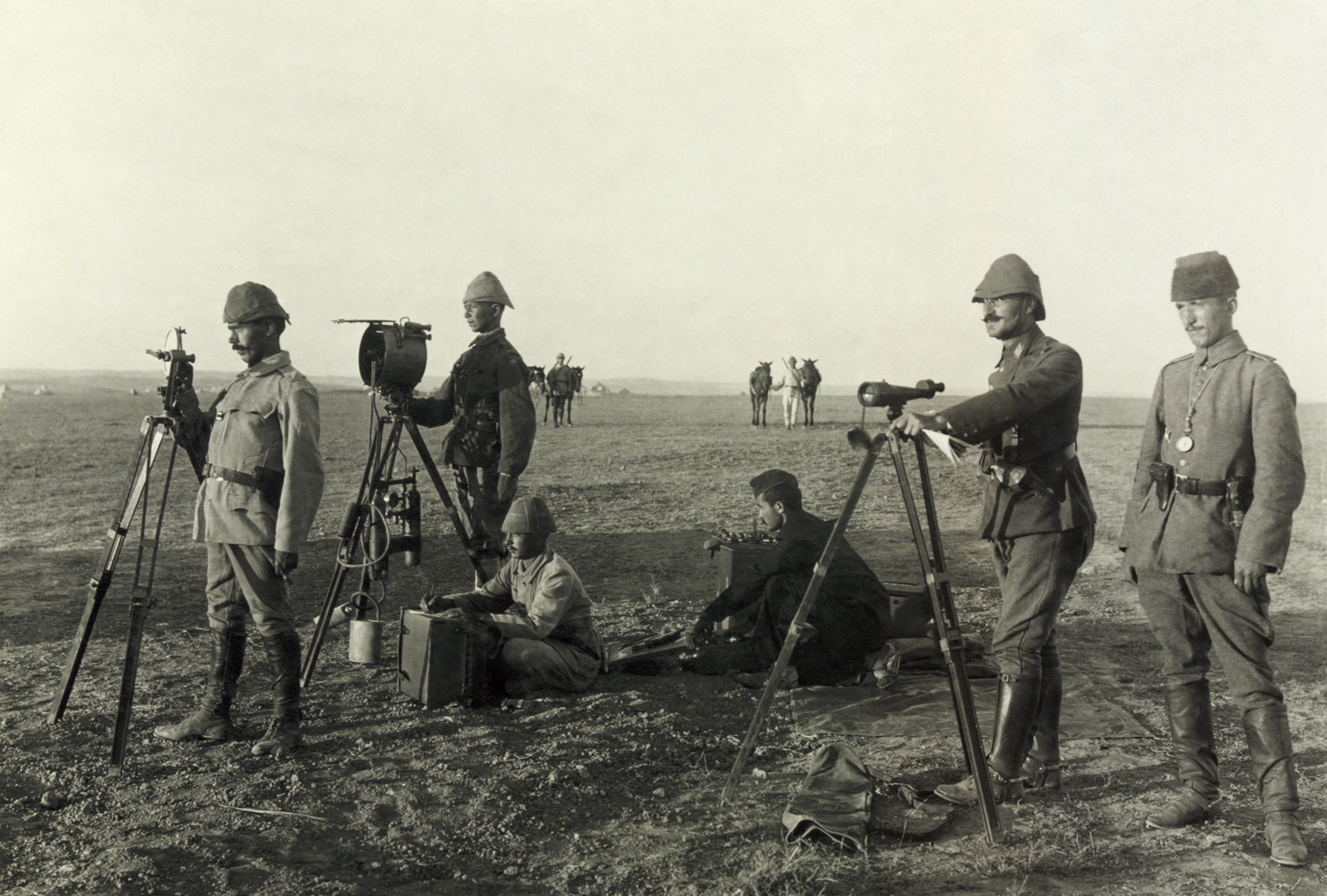
Engineering (Heliograph)

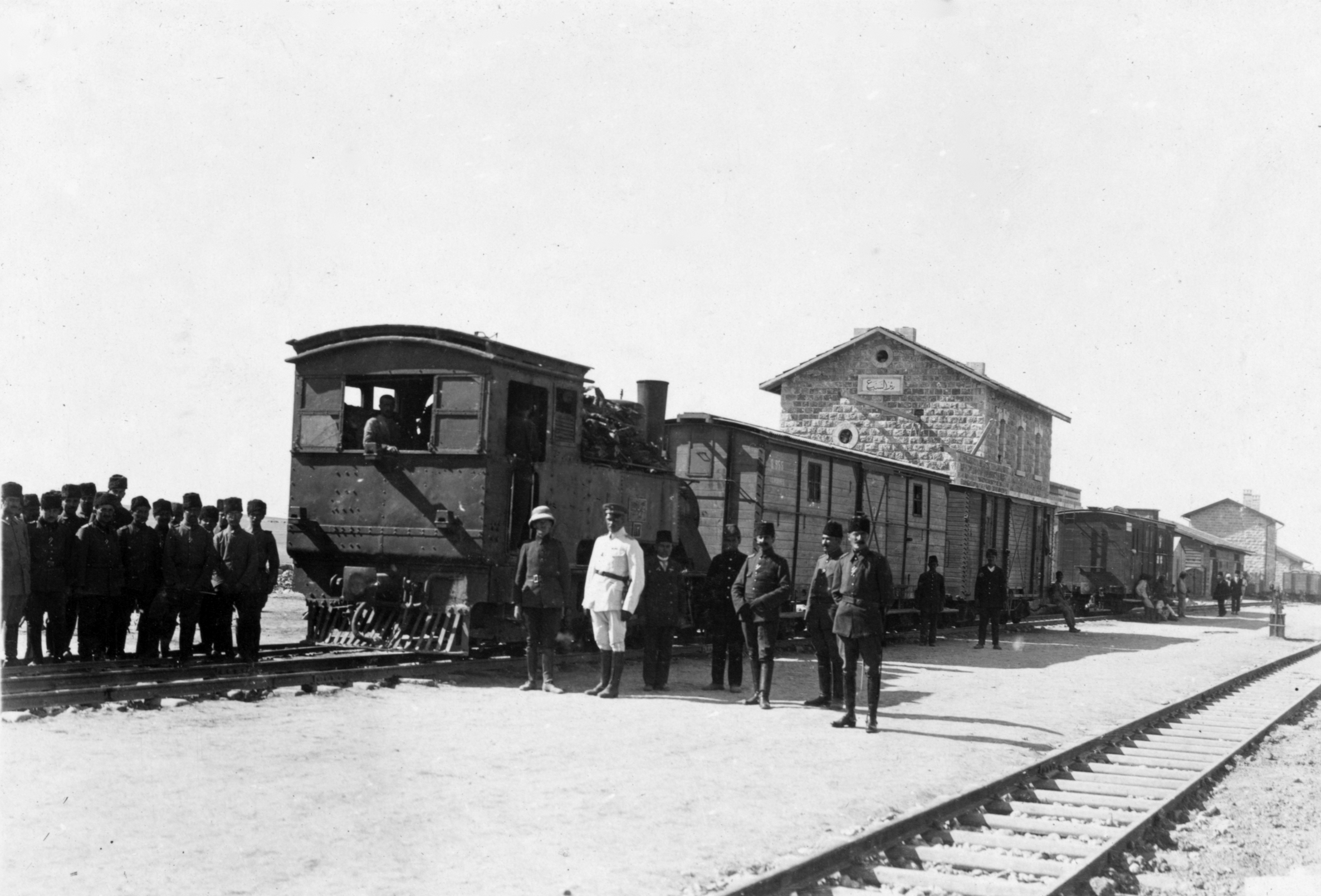
Engineering (Railroad)

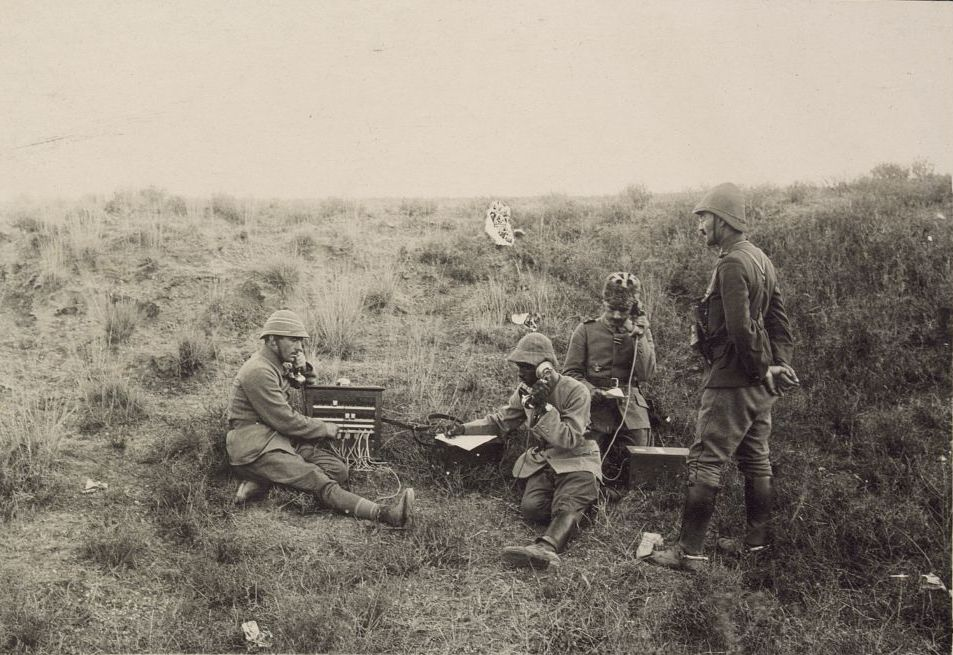
Communication (Telephone)

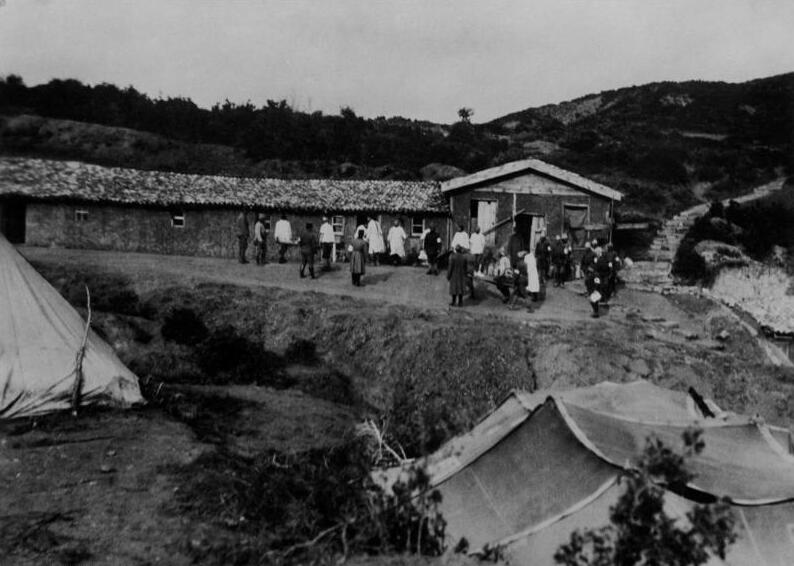
Medical (Field Hospital)

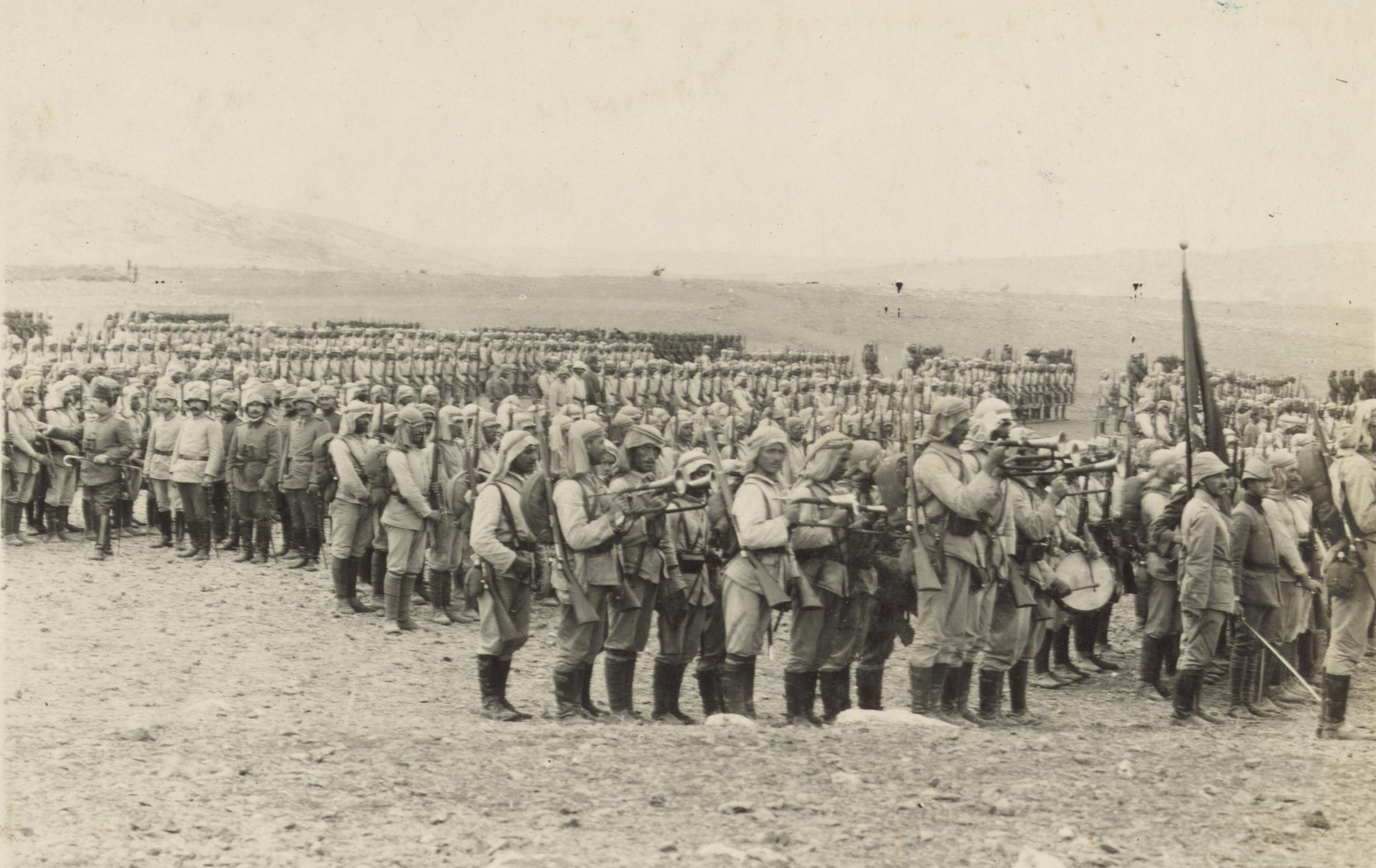
Military Band

=== Hamidiye light cavalry ===
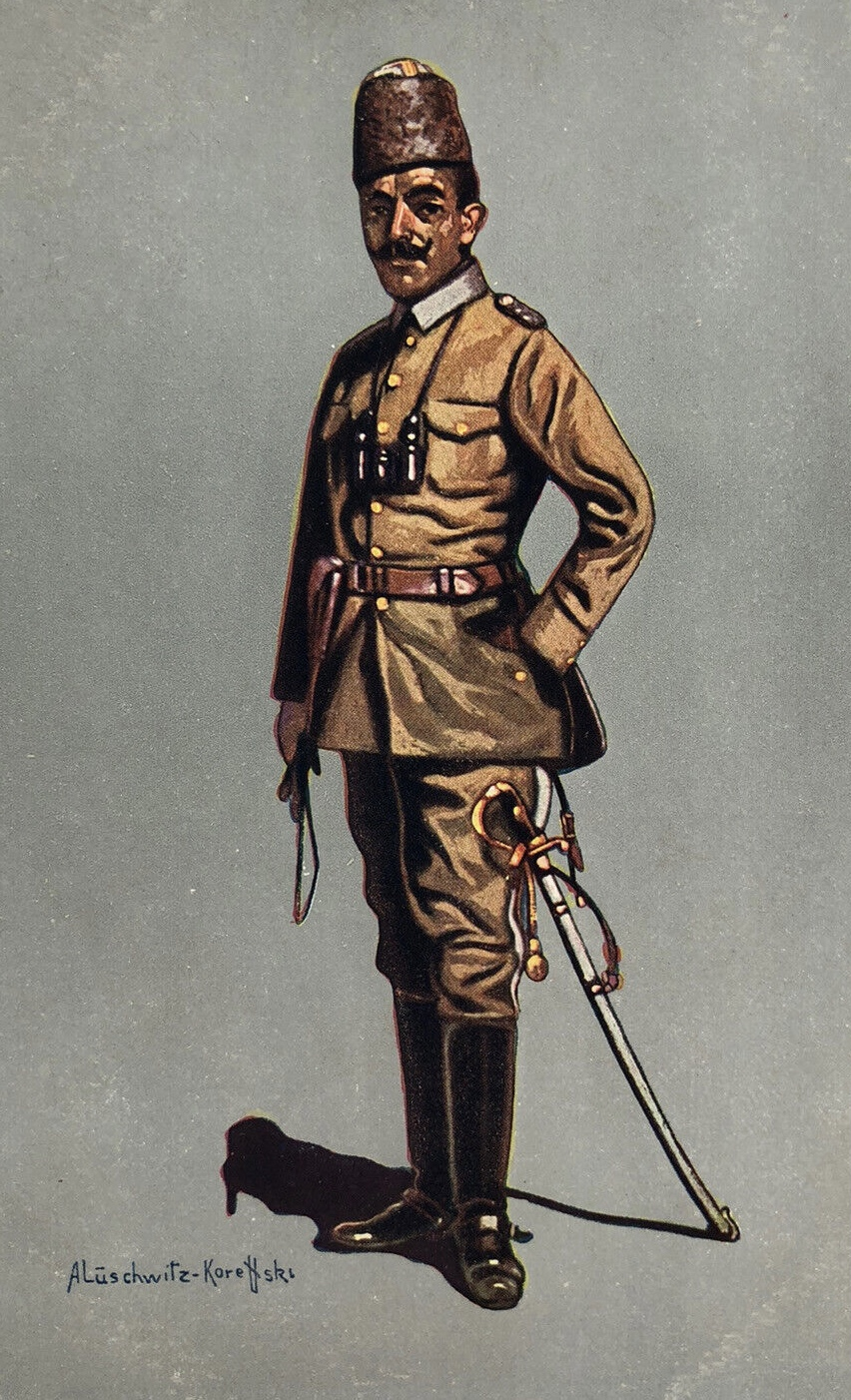
An Ottoman cavalry officer, c. 1912

The Hamidiye was the first trained and organized Kurdish force within the Ottoman army, created by the Ottoman sultan Abdul Hamid II in 1892. It was modeled after the Caucasian Cossack Regiments (i.e. the Persian Cossack Brigade) and tasked to patrol the Russo-Ottoman frontier. Despite its military appearance, organization and potential, the Hamidiye was in no way a cross-tribal force. Cavalrymen quickly found out that they could only be tried through a military court-martial, and were immune to civil administration. Realizing their immunity, they turned their forces into what some historians describe as "legalized robber brigades" as they stole grain, harvested fields, drove off herds, and openly stole from shopkeepers.

In 1908, after the overthrow of the Sultan, the Hamidiye Cavalry was disbanded as an organized force but, as they were “tribal forces” before official recognition, they stayed as “tribal forces” after dismemberment. The Hamidiye Cavalry is described as a military disappointment and a failure because of its contribution to tribal feuds.

However, recent research by Hidayet Kara suggests that the Hamidiye units were not independent groups but were integrated into the regular army structure, remaining under the control of high-ranking officers and the general staff to ensure regional security and integrate tribal forces into the state mechanism.

The decision to disband was made after the 1908 revolution and all of the units returned to their tribes by August 17, 1910. Militarily, Ottoman General Staff stated conventional-style military discipline had always been a problem with these units. They were replaced by the reserve cavalry formations.

=== Paramilitary units ===
The Ottoman Gendarmerie was a unit which was sent on police duties among civilian populations. The Gendarmerie was a paramilitary unit because it was not included as part of the state's formal armed forces. It was established in 1903 and organized under infantry gendarmerie and the cavalry gendarmerie. The units were small, with the regiment being the largest. They were distributed across the administrative units under Valis. Their number changed with security needs.

Historically, there was a Gendarmerie performing the same functions before 1903. Since the term Gendarmerie was found only in the Assignment Decrees published in the years following the Edict of Gülhane of 1839, it is assumed that the Gendarmerie organization was founded after that year, but the exact date of 'unit foundation' is not that date. There is also a manual, Asâkir-i Zaptiye Nizâmnâmesi, which was adopted on June 14, 1869, and is accepted as the foundation of the organization. After the 1877–1878 Russo-Turkish War, Ottoman grand vizier Mehmed Said Pasha decided to establish a modern law enforcement organization, so a military mission was formed for the task. After the Young Turk Revolution in 1908, the Gendarmerie achieved great successes, particularly in Rumelia.

In 1909, the Gendarmerie was affiliated with the Ministry of War and its name was changed to the Gendarmerie General Command (Ottoman Turkish: Umûm Jandarma Kumandanlığı). During World War One, especially after the Battle of Sarikamish, Gendarmerie units changed hands from Vali'es (a civilian authority) to the War Ministry (a military authority) to be a combatant branch. This change effectively made them combat units.

Paramilitary Units

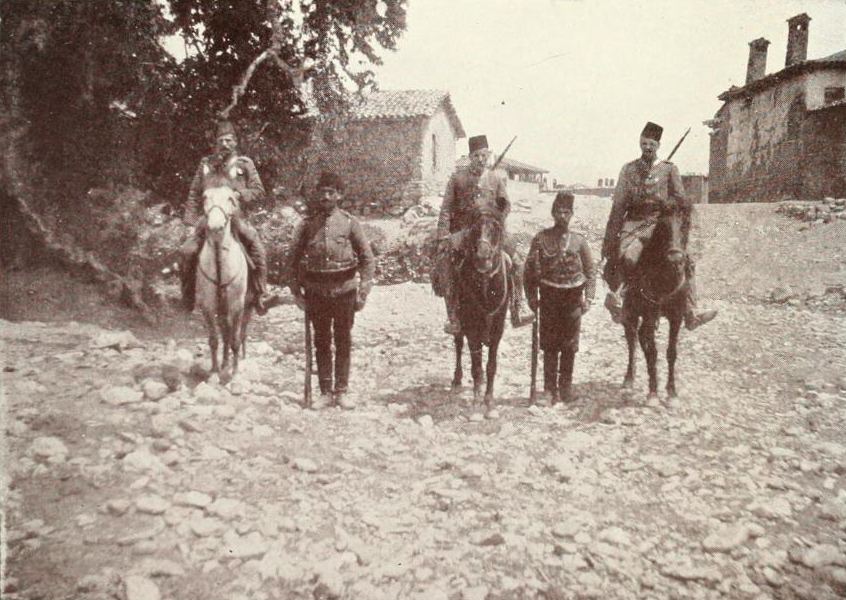
Ottoman Gendarmerie units in Macedonia

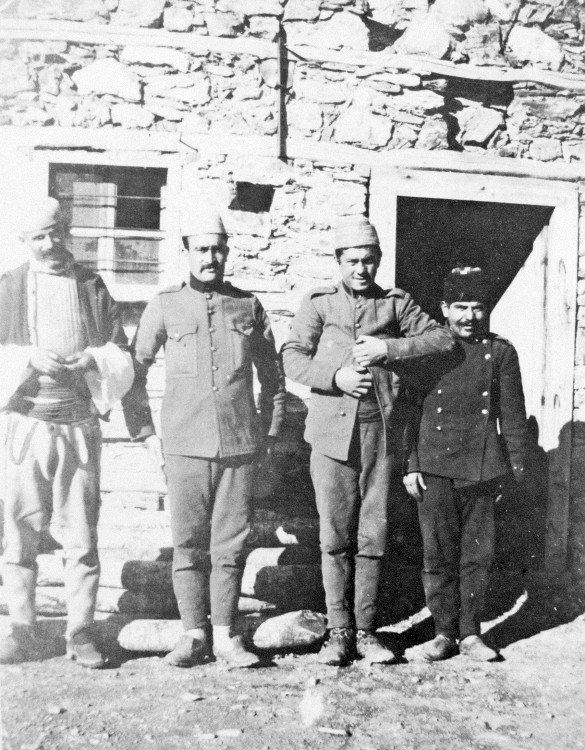
In Upper Reka

== Organization ==
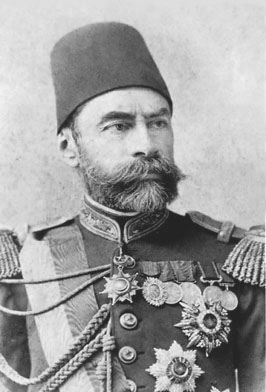
Müşir Ahmed Muhtar Pasha

After the Second Constitutional Era, 1908, the Ottoman General Staff published the “Regulation on Military Organisation.” It was adopted on July 9, 1910. Army commands were replaced by “army inspectorates” whose main responsibilities were training and mobilization. The army was to be composed of three parts: the regular army (nizamiye), the reserve army (redif) and the home guard (müstahfız). The “corps” concept was established. Reserve divisions were to be combined into reserve corps and they were to be given artillery units. Units of the regular army would recruit soldiers through the sources of the army inspectorate they belonged to.

The strengths of the Ottoman army were at the highest echelons of its rank structure. Unlike the British or the Germans, the Ottomans had no long service corps of professional non-commissioned officers, which was its weakest point.

=== Divisions ===
An infantry division was to be composed of three infantry regiments: a sharpshooter battalion, a field artillery regiment, and an army band. Divisions had operations, intelligence, judiciary, supplies, medical and veterinary departments.

=== Corps ===
Corps were composed of three divisions and other ancillary units. They had operations, personnel, judiciary, supplies, secretariat, veterinary, documentation, artillery, engineering and post divisions. Corps consist of 41,000 enlisted and 6,700 animals. During this period, not based on chronological order, the corps that were established were I, II, III, IV, V, VI, VII, VIII, IX, X, XI, XII, XIII, XIV, XV, XVI, XVII, XVIII, XIX, XX, XXI, XXII, XXV, Iraq Area, Halil, I Kaf., II Kaf., Hejaz

=== Fortified zones ===
Fortified zones had the same departments of divisions. They added documentation, artillery, engineering, communications and floodlight projectors. During this period the fortified zones that were established were Dardanelles, Bosporus, Chataldja, Adrianople, Smyrna, Erzurum, and Kars.

=== Army ===
Army headquarters had corps level departments and also infantry department, cavalry department and field gendarmerie department.

- The 1st Army was formed on September 6, 1843.
- The 2nd Army was originally formed in 1873.
- The 3rd Army was originally formed in the Balkans and headquarters was at Salonica.
- The 4th Army was originally formed in Anatolia.
- The 5th Army was formed on March 24, 1915, and assigned the responsibility of defending the Dardanelles straits in World War I.
- The 6th Army was formed in 1877 and was stationed in Baghdad.
- The 7th Army was formed in 1877 and was stationed in Yemen.
- The 8th Army was formed during World War I.
- The 9th Army was formed during World War I.

=== Army Group ===
The Army Group developed late in World War I. The conflicts depleted the Army units, so Army Groups were used to compensate for the lost units and keep the remainder functioning.

In August 1917, the Caucasus Army Group was established. It was a unification of the Second and Third Armies. In July 1917, the Yildirim Army Group was established. It was a unification of the Sixth and Seventh Armies. In June 1918, the Eastern Army Group was established. The unit was composed of whatever was left from the Caucasus Army Group united under the Third and Ninth Army.

=== General Staff ===
The General Staff was the group of officers who were responsible for the administrative, operational and logistical needs of the army. The general staff fulfilled the classic staff duties then in use by all major European powers and was staffed by trained general staff officers, who were selected and trained in staff procedures at the War Academy in Constantinople. After completion of the War Academy, graduates were advanced in grade over their non-graduate contemporaries and immediately assigned to key billets in the army. The staff was supervised by a chief of staff and was composed of various divisions, which specialized in a variety of military fields. The most influential staff division was the Operations Division. Staff provided bi-directional flow of information between a commanding officer and subordinate units.

In the Ottoman Army, staff officers in all levels were combatants, a comparison to other armies that have enlisted personnel for specific tasks that were non-combatant. Before the Second Constitutional Era, the Sultan and his high-ranking staff officers performed the main planning and activity of the Ministry of War, which was established in 1826. During this time, the General Staff was a department within the Ministry of War. It performed the recruitment, reserves, judiciary and printing military charts. Ahmed Izzet Pasha, who became the chief of general staff on August 15, 1908, was aware of the urgent need of this institution to be reformed. Ahmed Izzet Pasha's work produced good results and he managed to provide a better and much more efficient structure for the General Staff. At the outbreak of the Balkan Wars, the General Staff was divided into seven departments. It formed the headquarters of Nazım Pasha, the acting head commander. When the war was lost, further changes were needed. These came with Enver Pasha, who on January 3, 1914, replaced Ahmed Izzet Pasha as both the minister of war and the chief of general staff.

During the course of the World War, the Ottoman General Staff had seven departments: operations, intelligence, railroads, education, military history, personnel and documentation.

==== Force sustainment ====
LoCI was modeled on German organizational architecture. German organization was designed to operate at friendly rear areas. Neither Ottoman nor German LoCIs were staffed or equipped to do much more than coordinate logistics and transport supplies.

The history of transportation starts with World War I. The World War I Ottoman logistics system was a pipeline that moved men and supplies from rear areas to forward stations and further distribution to front-line corps and infantry divisions. 279 officers, 119 doctors, and 12,279 men were assigned at the onset, but by April 14, 1915, few of these were available for point or area security.

Under heavy insurgency, “protected logistics areas” were created for both convoys and for fixed facilities such as hospitals and magazines. The idea of protected logistics areas were carried from the Ottoman Classical Army. When plotted on a map, the protected logistic areas gave the heavy insurgency points. These were established along the Sivas-Erzurum corridor, which carried the bulk of the Third Army's supplies, and along the Trabzon-Erzurum corridor, which carried the army's magazine capacity.

The weak road network within the Third Army area was rapidly deteriorating in 1914. Every province had civilian road workers and they were not enough to maintain the all-weather roads. The combatant units would not last more than couple days without the logistic support. Increased need required the army to build up its labor services, which did transfer resources from allocated units to combat to sustain the front. During World War I, European armies had ten logistic persons for one combatant.

The Ottoman labour services (amela taburu) were noncombatants, so they were unarmed, as in the other armies. The Ottoman Army had only six labour service battalions in 1914. In 1915, these were reorganized and expanded to 30 battalions of which 11 were deployed on the Erzincan-Erzurum-Hasankale-Tortum corridor. In 1915 the labour battalions were an essential and absolute requirement for the function of Third Army. Attrition wore the combat battalions down, but World War I was also hard on the non-combatant units. During 1916, at the high point of the Russian advance, the labor battalions were targeted. In the summer of 1916, the surviving 28 labor battalions were reorganized into 17 full strength battalions.

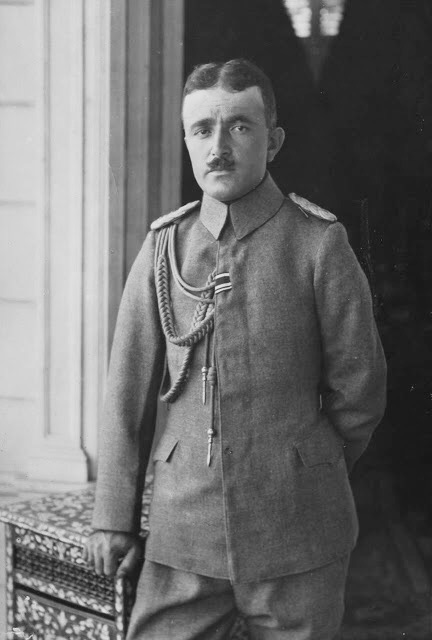
Enver Pasha, Minister of War during World War I

==== Chief of General Staff ====
The General Staff was organized under the Chief of General Staff.

- Ahmed Izzet Pasha from August 15, 1908, to January 1, 1914
- Enver Pasha from January 3, 1914, to October 4, 1918
- Ahmed Izzet Pasha from October 4, 1918, to November 3, 1918
- Cevat Pasha from November 3, 1918, to December 24, 1918
- Fevzi Pasha from December 24, 1918, to May 14, 1919
- Cevat Pasha from May 14, 1919, to August 2, 1919
- Hâdî Pasha from August 2, 1919, to September 12, 1919
- Fuad Pasha from September 12, 1919, to October 9, 1919
- Cevat Pasha from October 9, 1919, to February 16, 1920
- Shevket Turgut Pasha from February 16, 1920, to April 19, 1920
- Nazif Pasha from April 19, 1920, to May 2, 1920
- Hadi Pasha from May 2, 1920, to May 19, 1920

=== Ministry of War (War Department) ===
The apex of the Ottoman military hierarchy was the Ministry of War, which had been established in 1826 with the Auspicious Incident and which underwent several reorganizations during the Ottoman military reforms. Within the ministry, there were offices for procurement, combat arms, peacetime military affairs, mobilization, and promotions.

==== Special Organization ====
The Special Organization was a special forces unit established in 1913. It was an organization designed to establish insurgency and function as an intelligence service. Instigating insurgency, conducting espionage in foreign countries, and counterespionage inside the Ottoman Empire was its function between 1913 and 1918. (Note: War minister Enver operated a guerrilla unit as an early assignment in Libya. He knew the inherent strengths and limitations. He used special organization to counter act insurgency and support his regular army.) The institutional origin, the reason given in the strategic document, was related to the unsatisfactory result of the First Balkan War. Its goal was the recovery of Edirne. This military organization had no precedent in Ottoman history, and it was directly developed out of the counterinsurgency experiences from Macedonia and the guerrilla experiences from Libya with a handful of Ottoman officers. The difference between the secret service of Abdul Hamid II was that it was directly linked to him and did not have an operational function. (Note: Abdülhanúd’s Secret Service (Hafive) and Yildaz Palace Intelligence Service (Yildiz Is-tihbarat Teskilati). They were transferred to the ministry of security in 1909.) (Note: There is a large number of cables, notes, summaries (40,000) from 1913 through 1918, which proves the military rather than a political function) There is a controversy on burned intelligence documents of the special forces, which Shaw puts in 1914. On that day, Enver Pasha became war minister and destroyed Abdul Hamid's records and probably intelligence on him. The first field operator was Süleyman Askerî, who undertook the first mission and established the field structure. There is no actual evidence to support any claims of a dual-track structure (an operation with both political and military goals). The organization sub-management consisted of Atif Kamçil, Aziz Bey, Dr. Bahaeddin Şakir, and Dr. Nazım Bey. (Note: Bahattin akir, Dr. Nazim, Omer Naji, and Hilmi Bey, were members of the special organization talked at Armenian congress at Erzurum) The staff was organized into four departments: the European Section headed by Arif Bey, the Caucasian Section headed by Captain Reza Bey, the Africa and Libya Section headed by Hüseyin Tosun Bey, and the Eastern Provinces Section headed by Dr. Sakir and Rueni Bey. The headquarters was on Nur-i Osmariiye Street in Istanbul.

==== War Council ====
The War Council was under the Ministry of War. Established by the high-ranking staff officers during wartime, the head of the council was the Sultan. After 1908, the Ministry of War became part of the Imperial Government. In 1908, the Ministry of War's high-ranking staff officers moved to the War Council. The War Council was abolished when Enver Pasha became the minister of war. The Sultan's group of high-ranking staff officers were silently removed from control. In its final form, the Ministry of War was a part of a civilian structure, which left the General Staff to a military establishment.

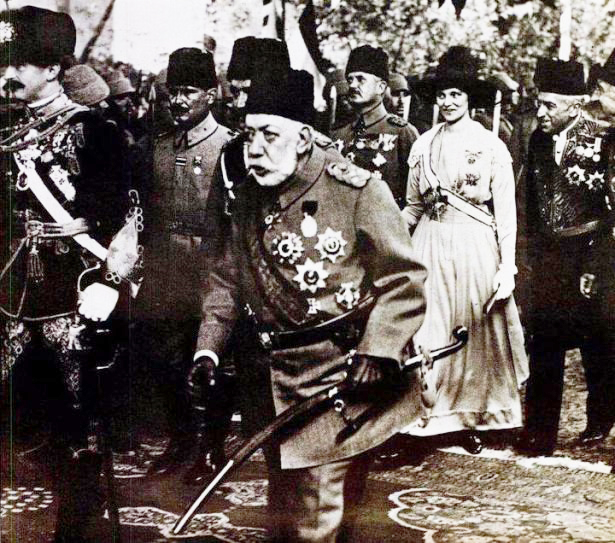
Mehmed V was titular the Commander-in-Chief of the Ottoman military forces during World War I. Pictured Mehmed V hosting Charles I of Austria (left) in Constantinople, 1918

==== Minister of War (Nazir-i Harbiye) ====
The titular Commander-in-Chief of the Ottoman military forces was the Sultan Mehmed V. The Minister of War fulfilled the role of commander of the military forces. During wartime, the Minister of War was the overall commander of the Ottoman Army.

== Personnel ==
The modern army simplified the rank structure, but the rank system remained very complex.

At the onset of the Second Constitutional Era in 1908, there were 58-year-old lieutenants, 65-year-old captains, and 80-year-old majors. In 1909, reformation age limits were set (41 for lieutenant, 46 for captains, 52 for majors, 55 for lieutenant colonels, 58 for colonels, 60 for brigadier generals, 65 for generals and 68 for field marshals).

=== Commissioned officers ===
Military ranks
Ottoman ranks	Western equivalents
Officers
Müşir	Field marshal
Birinci Ferik (Serdar)	General
Ferik	Lieutenant general
Mirliva	Major general
Miralay	Brigadier
Kaymakam	Colonel
Binbaşı	Lieutenant colonel
Kolağası	Major
Yüzbaşı	Captain
Mülâzım-ı Evvel	First lieutenant
Mülâzım-ı Sani	Second lieutenant

=== Enlisted personnel ===
In 1908, active duty lengths were set at two years for the infantry, three years for other branches of the Army and five years for the Navy. During the course of the World War, these remained largely theoretical.

Military ranks
Ottoman ranks	Western equivalents
Non-commissioned officers
Çavuş	Sergeant
Onbaşı	Corporal
Soldiers
Nefer	Private

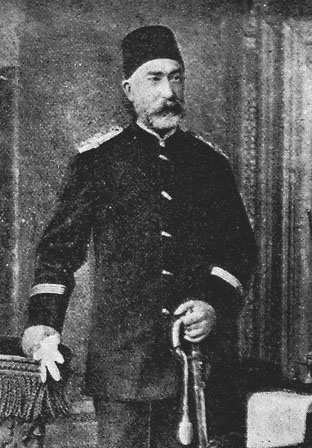
The uniform of a serasker, the highest military rank of the Ottoman Empire

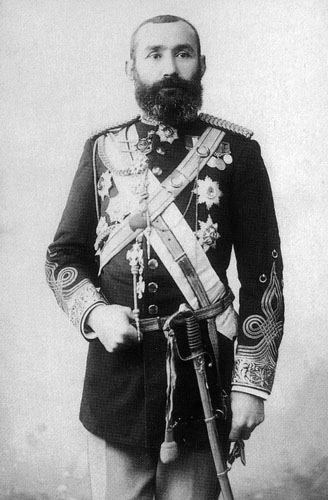
Army general Mehmed Şakir Pasha

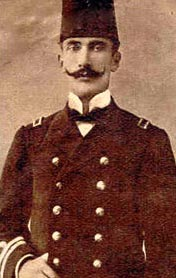
Conscripted naval cadet Fuat Hüsnü Kayacan

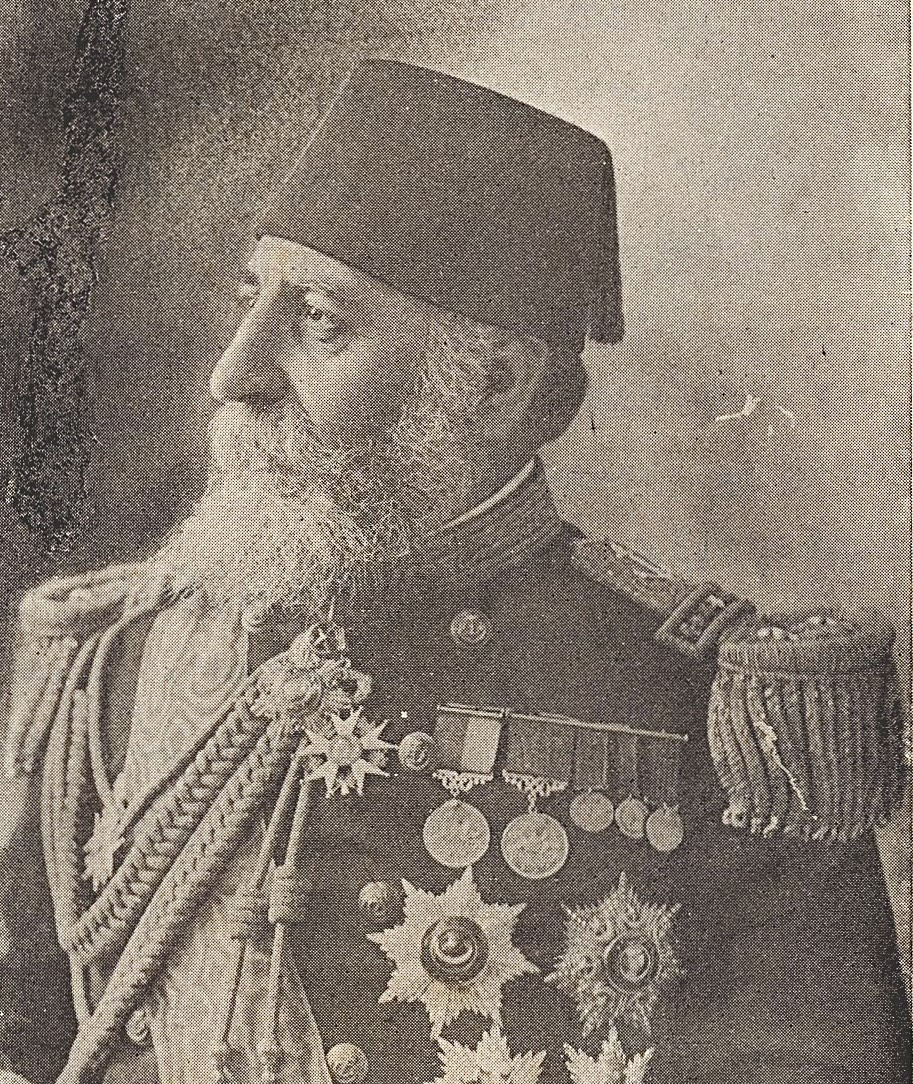
Naval uniform (pictured Hüseyin Hüsnü Pasha)

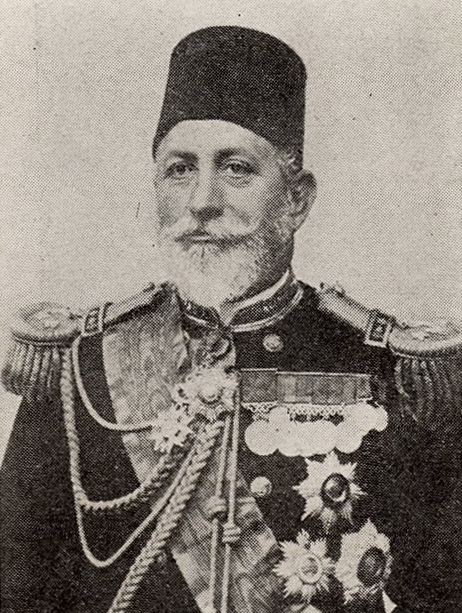
Admiral Hasan Rami Pasha

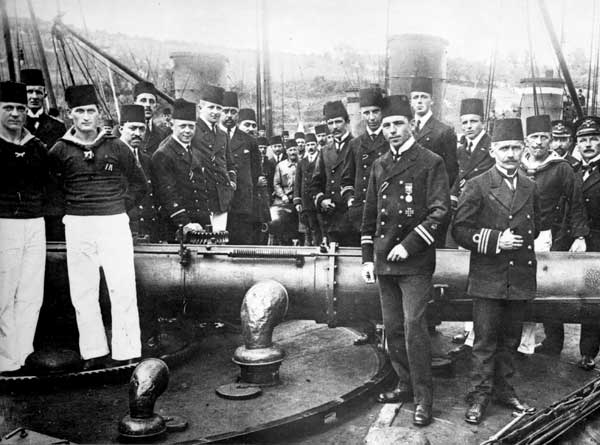
Naval uniforms

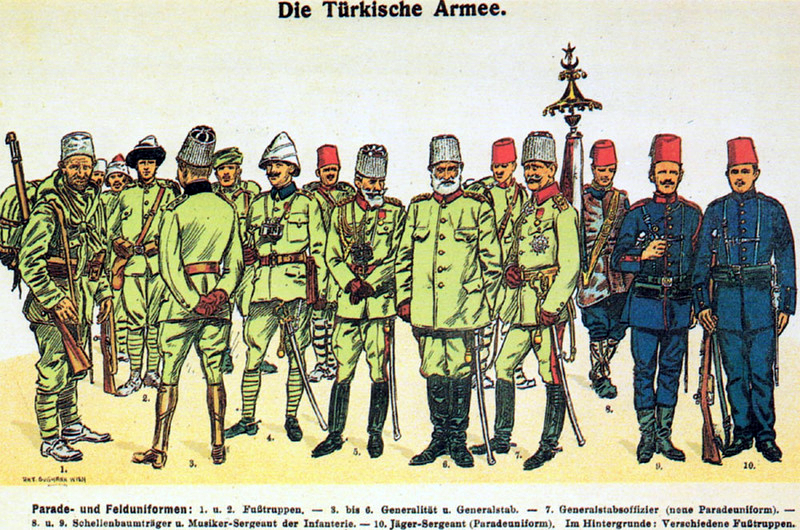
Parade and field uniforms, 1914

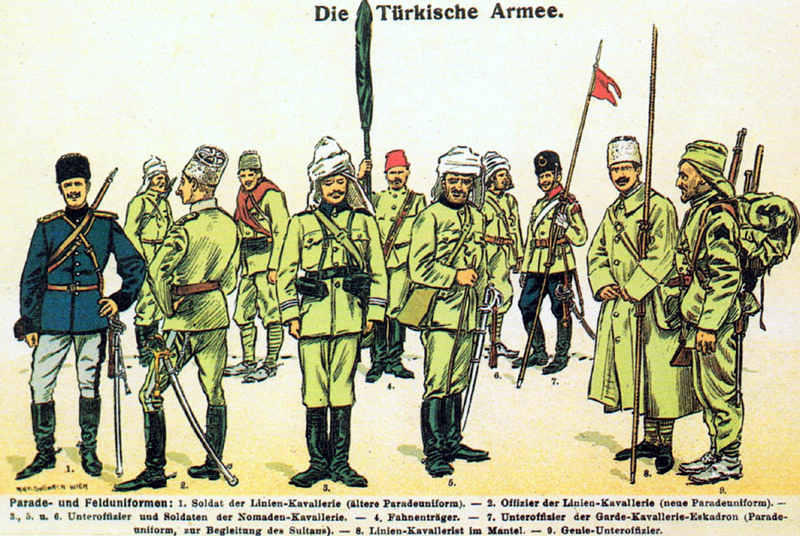
Parade and field uniforms, 1914

=== Training ===
In the Ottoman Army, the commissioned officers who received training relating to their specific military occupational specialty or function in the military were called mektepli (educated) officers. There were also commissioned officers who did not receive training but were put through service in the ranks at specific periods of time. These commissioned officers were called alaylı. The Ottoman Empire tried to replace alaylı with mektepli officers, because a majority of the officers were alaylı. Princes (by birth) and important statesmen (by position) were considered officers even though they had not received military training or worked through ranks. It is also true that commissioned officers may have had leadership training (viziers, governors, etc.) and management generalists (medicine, engineering, etc.).

==== Ottoman Military Academy ====
The academy was formed in 1834 by Mehmed Namık Pasha and Marshal Ahmed Fevzi Pasha as the Mekteb-i Harbiye ("War School"), and the first class of officers graduated in 1841. Its formation was a part of the military reforms within the Ottoman Empire as it recognized the need for more educated officers to modernize its army.

==== Ottoman Armed Forces College ====
The Ottoman Armed Forces College was founded in 1848. It was renamed the Armed Forces College in 1964.

==== Ottoman Military College (Staff Officers) ====
In order to train Staff Officers in the same system as European armies, the 3rd and 4th years were created in the War Academy in 1848 under the name of “Imperial War School of Military Sciences" General Staff Courses. Abdülkerim Pasha was appointed as the first director of these courses. As part of the reorganization efforts of the Ottoman Army, new arrangements were implemented in 1866 for the Staff College and other Military Schools. Through these arrangements, the General Staff training was extended to three years and, with additional military courses, a special emphasis was placed on exercises and hands-on training. Although staff officers were initially considered to be part of an entirely different military branch, following 1867 new programs were implemented to train staff officers for branches like infantry, cavalry and artillery. In 1899, a new system was developed on the principle that the General Staff Courses should train more officers with higher military education in addition to Staff Officers’ training. Following this rule, a greater number of officers from the Army War Academy were admitted to the Staff College. This process continued until 1908. Following the declaration of the Second Constitutional Period, the structure of the Staff College was rearranged with a new Staff College Regulation dated 4 August 1909. The new designation, “General Staff School,” passed in October.

With the General Staff School, the practice of direct transition from Army War Academy to Staff College was abolished and admission into Staff College now required two years of field service following the Army War Academy. Afterward, the officers were subjected to examinations, and those who passed the exam were admitted into the college as Staff Officer candidates. Following the Allied occupation of Constantinople on 16 March 1920, military schools were dissolved by the victors of the First World War; nevertheless, the Staff College was managed to continue its activities until April 1921 at the Şerif Pasha Mansion in Teşvikiye, Constantinople where it had been moved on 28 January 1919. After all instructors and students went to Anatolia to join the National War of Independence, the Staff College was closed down.

=== Military missions ===
The French military system was used before the modern Ottoman Army was developed. After defeat from Russia in the war of 1877–78, the Ottoman's reform process began with a fundamental revision: the German military system replaced the French one. The first German military mission arrived in Capitol in 1882. It was headed by a cavalry officer named Koehler, who was appointed as aide-de-camp.

There were three military missions active at the turn of 1914. These were the British Naval Mission led by Admiral Arthur Limpus, the French Gendarme Mission led by General Moujen, and the German Military Mission led by Colmar Freiherr von der Goltz.

==== British military mission ====
British military advisors, which were mainly naval, had less impact on the Ottoman navy. The British naval mission was established in 1912 under Admiral Arthur Limpus. He was recalled in September 1914 due to increasing concern Britain would soon enter the war. The mission of reorganizing the Ottoman Navy was taken over by Rear Admiral Wilhelm Souchon of the Imperial German Navy. The Ottoman ships were painted the same colours as those of the Royal Navy, and the officer insignia mirrored that of the British.

The British Naval Mission was led by:

- Admiral Douglas Gamble (February 1909 – March 1910)
- Admiral Hugh Pigot Williams (April 1910 – April 1912)
- Admiral Arthur Limpus (April 1912 – September 1914)

==== French military mission ====
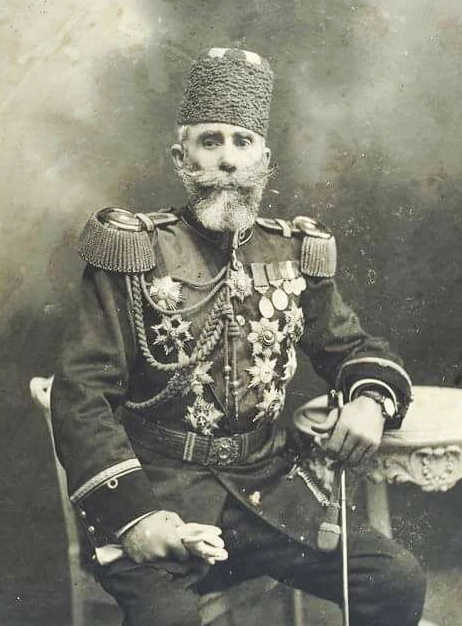
Mahmud Shevket Pasha is credited with the creation of the Ottoman Air Force in 1911

French military advisors were very effective. A fledgling air force was started in 1912, its history began under the Ottoman Aviation Squadrons. A complete overhaul of the provincial gendarme was also a part of the French military mission. The French gendarme mission was led by General Moujen.

==== German military mission ====
The German military mission became the third most important command center (Sultan, Minister of War, Head of Mission) for the Ottoman Army.

The German mission was accredited from 27 October 1913 to 1918. General Otto Liman von Sanders, previously commander of the 22nd Division, was assigned by the Kaiser to Constantinople. Germany considered an Ottoman-Russian war to be imminent, and Liman von Sanders was a general with excellent knowledge of the Russian armed forces. The Ottoman Empire was undecided about which side to take in a future war involving Germany, Britain and France. The 9th article of the German Military Mission stated that in case of a war the contract would be annulled.

The German military mission eventually became the most important among the military missions. The history of German-Ottoman military relations went back to the 1880s. Grand Vizier Said Halim Pasha and Minister of War Ahmed Izzet Pasha were instrumental in developing initial relations. Kaiser Wilhelm II ordered on der Goltz to establish the first German mission. General Goltz served two periods within two years. In early 1914, the Ottoman Minister of War was a former military attaché to Berlin, Enver Pasha. About the same time, General Otto Liman von Sanders, was nominated to the command of the German 1st Army, the largest on the European side.

Military Missions

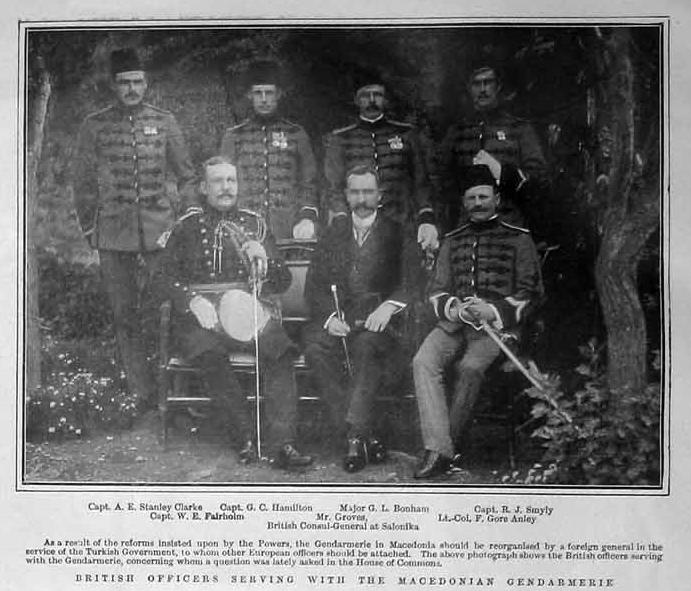
British officers in the Ottoman Gendarmerie

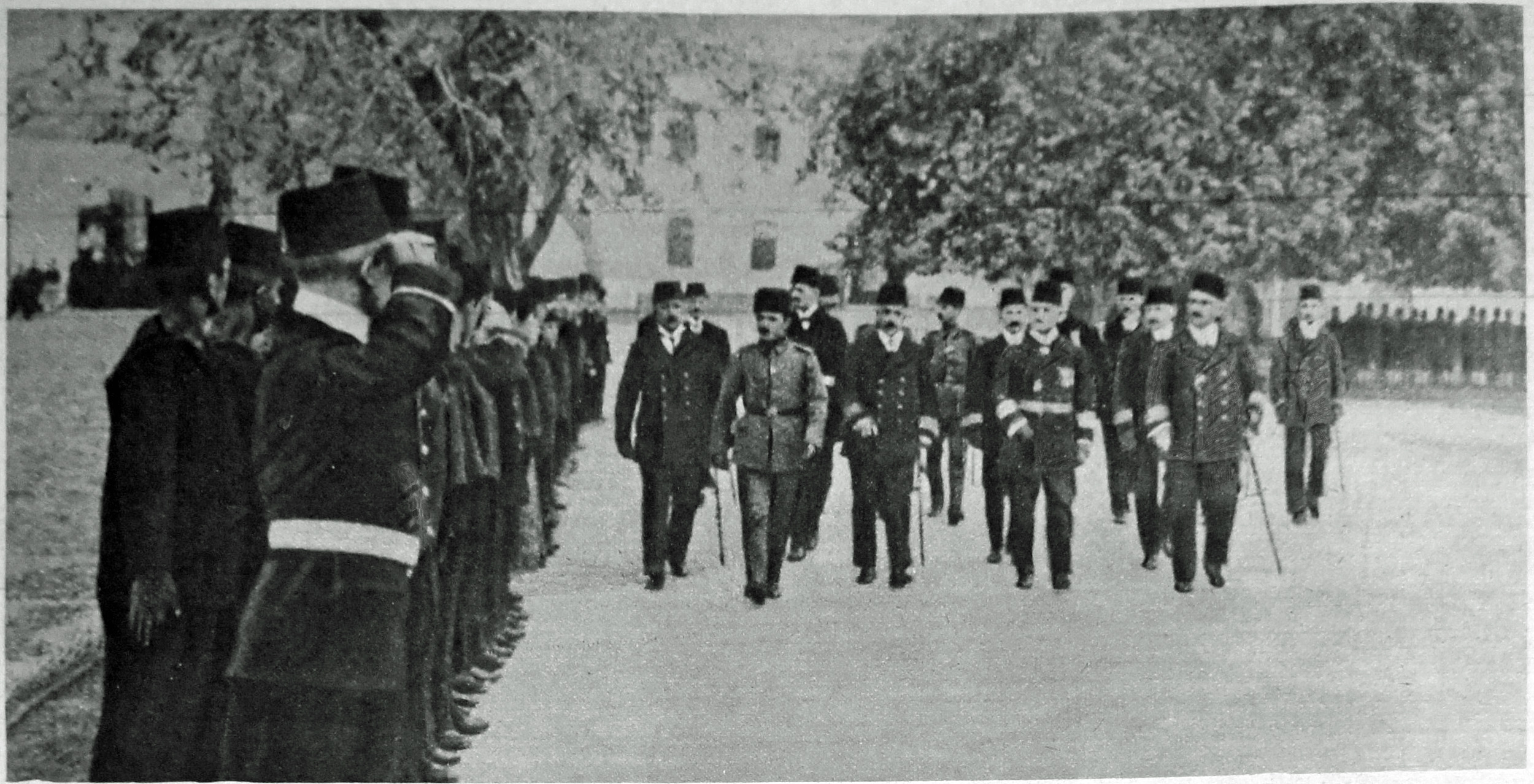
Wilhelm Souchon before the Black Sea Raid at an inspection, later he was awarded the Pour le Mérite

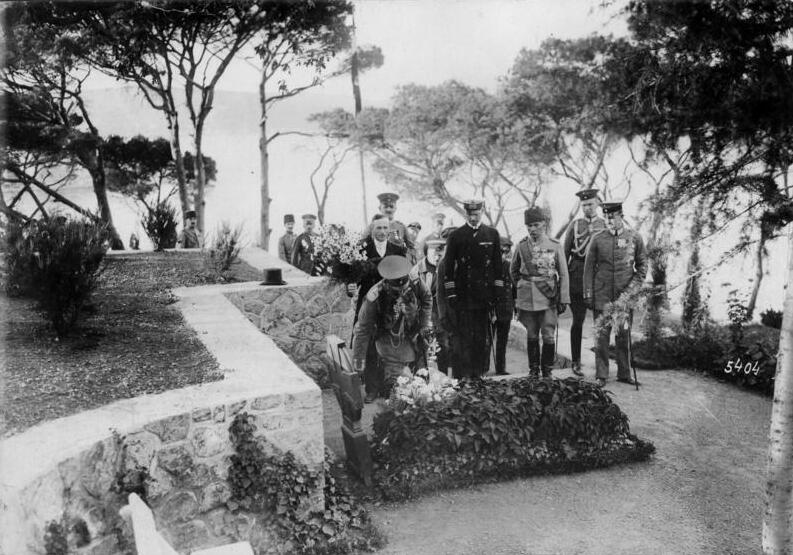
Wilhelm II and Colmar Freiherr von der Goltz in Constantinople

=== Military culture ===
H. G. Dwight related witnessing an Ottoman military burial in Constantinople and took pictures of it. Dwight says that the soldiers were from every nation (of every ethnicity), so they were only distinguished by their religion, in groups of "Mohammedans" and "Christians". The sermons were performed as based on the count of Bibles, Korans, and Tanakhs in provenance of the battlefield. This is what the caption of one slide reads (on the right):

One officer was left, who made to the grave-diggers and spectators a speech of moving simplicity. "Brothers," he said, "Here are men of every nation – Turks, Albanians, Greeks, Bulgarians, Jews; but they died together, on the same day, fighting under the same flag. Among us, too, are men of every nation, both Mohammedan and Christian; but we also have one flag and we pray to one God. Now, I am going to make a prayer, and when I pray let each one of you pray also, in his own language, in his own way.

== Equipment ==
Sultan Abdul Hamid II became aware of the need to renew the army's weapons in the late 19th century, when the European arms industries were making rapid technological progress. The Ottoman Army had low-efficiency, obsolete weapons. Abdul Hamid II removed the old system, but only a small munitions industry was developed. As a consequence, the Ottoman Army relied on imports and grants from its allies for weapons and equipment. The situation was improved through a decree issued on July 3, 1910, which included the arms and ammunition budget.

=== Weapons ===
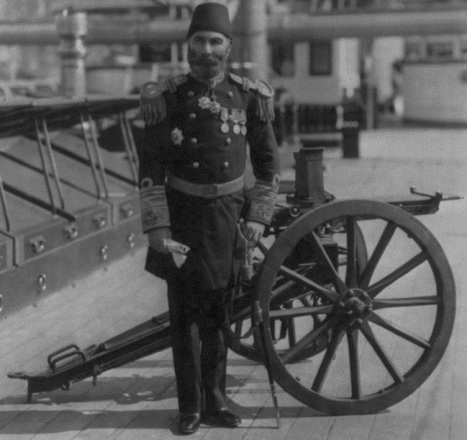
An Ottoman commander of the Imperial Ironclad Fleet, posing with a ship's landing party four-barrel Nordenfelt gun

General Vidinli Tevfik Paşa was sent to Germany to analyse, select, and purchase Mauser rifles. Instead of the offered rifles (Mauser M1890), the Ottomans bought the Mauser M1893 and M1903 in 7.65 mm caliber. When constitutional rule was restored in 1908, the Ottoman Army mostly had basic rifles, with only a few rapid-firing ones.

The Ottoman Army had no machine gun units until early 1910 (because of the changes implemented on July 3, 1910). The available ones were used on warships and for coastal defense. The few machine guns were all Maxim-Nordenfelt Maxim guns (MG09 version). In the following years, only a handful of Hotchkiss M1909s and Schwarzlose MG M.07/12s were added.

In 1914, officers mainly had Browning M1903s, Mauser C96s and, in some quantity, Behollas, Frommer M912s, Luger P08s, and Smith & Wesson No. 3s.

The infantry used two different kinds of grenades. The most commonly used offensive grenades were the German M1915 and M1917 Stielhandgranate. There were also defensive grenades used, which were "ball" and "egg" shaped.

The most common types of Ottoman field guns during WWI were German-designed and manufactured 75-mm Krupp M03 L/30 Field, 77-mm Krupp M96 L/27 nA and the 77-mm Rheinmetall M16 L/35 guns. Desperately short of field artillery, the Ottoman Army also used a lot of older and obsolescent field guns, some dating back to the 1870s, as well as captured Russian and British guns.

Weapons

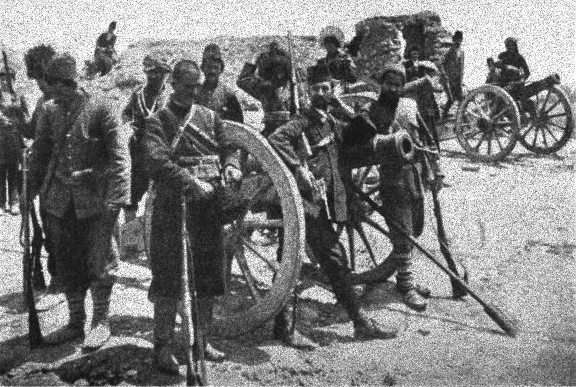
Ottoman cannons captured by the Armenian militia at the Defense of Van (1915)

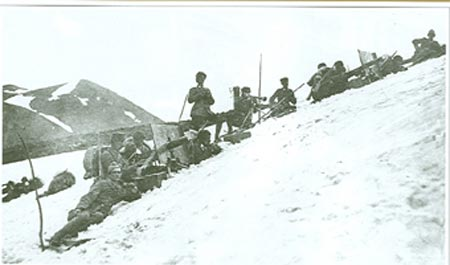
An Ottoman machine gun and troops at the Battle of Sarikamish 1915

=== Vehicles ===
Vehicles

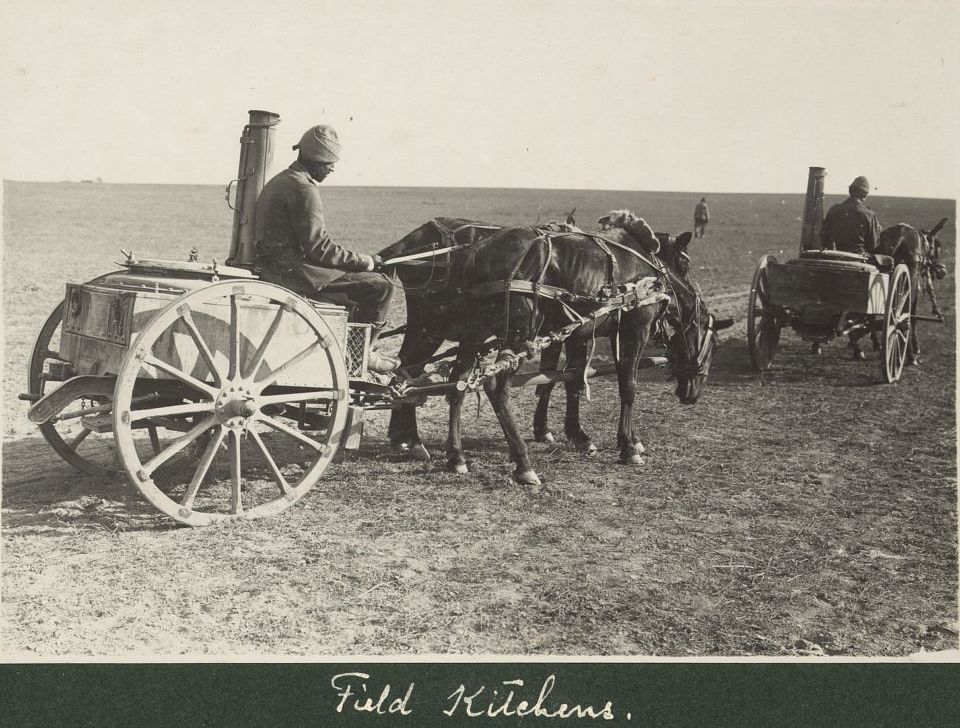
Field kitchen

=== Uniforms ===
Bayonets were made by German companies in Solingen and Suhl.

Uniforms, 1914

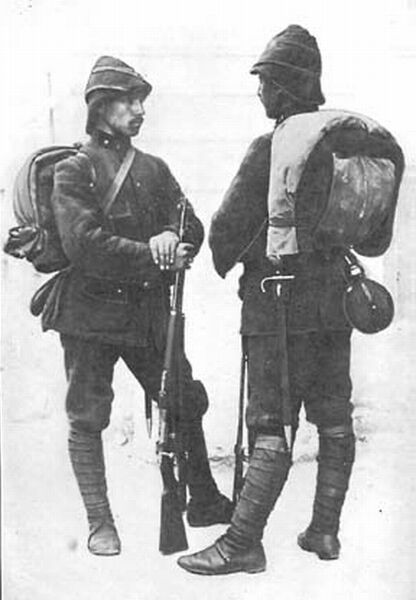
Standard

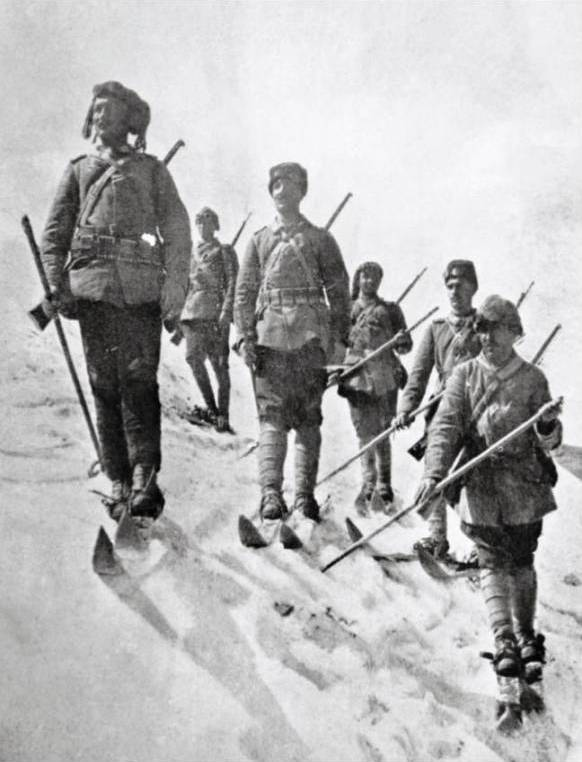
Winter

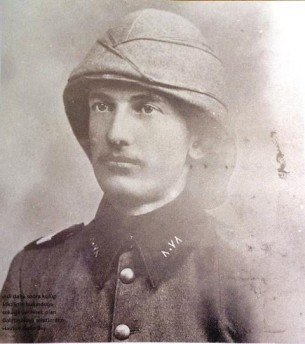
Standard

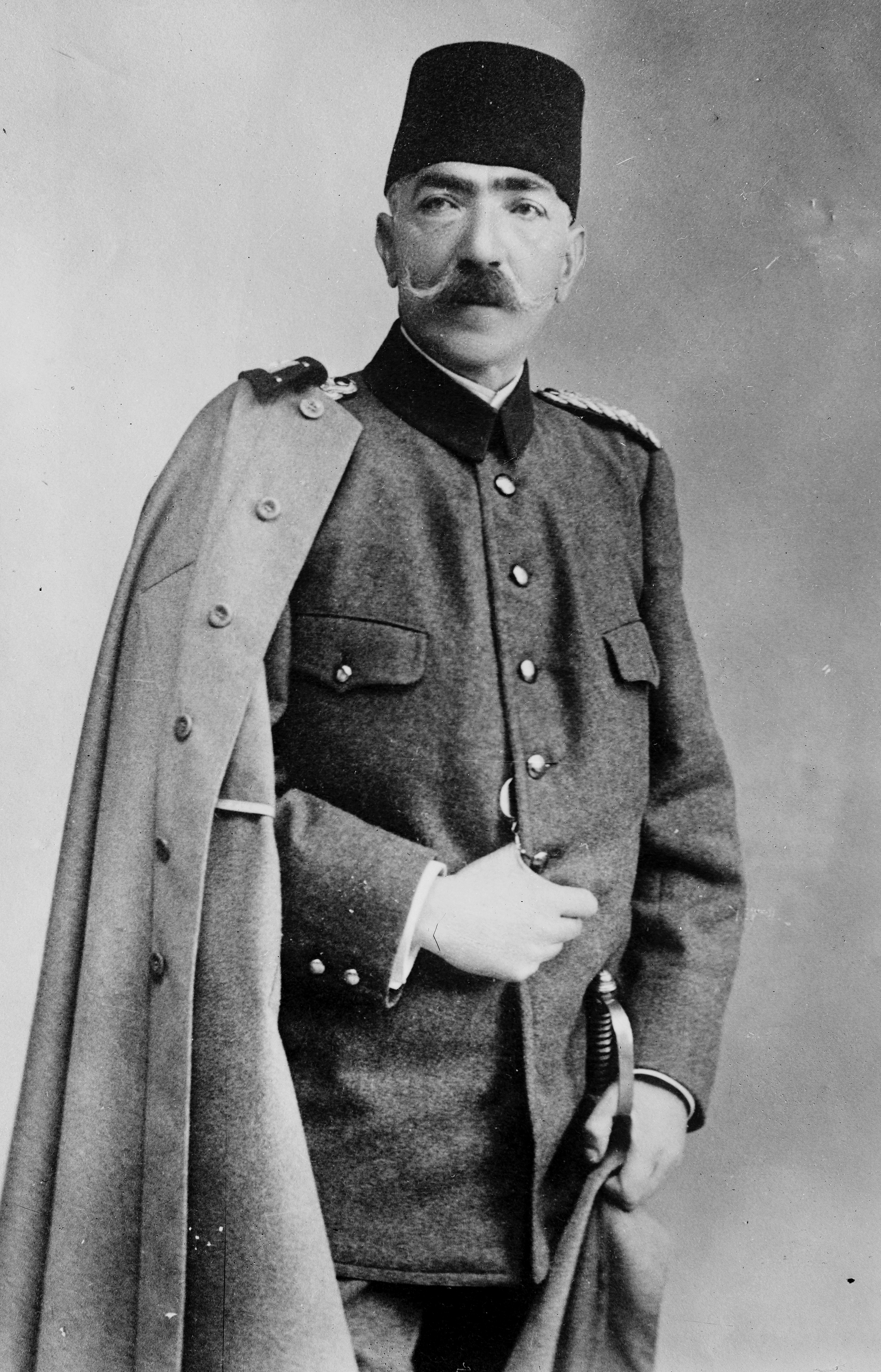
Officer

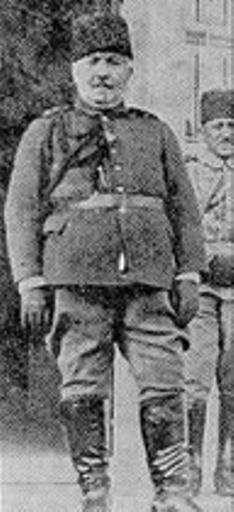
Officer

== Position of Units ==
=== 1877 ===
The Ottoman army on the eve of the Russo-Turkish war
Corps	light infantry	Infantry	Cavalry	Artillery	Engineer/sapper
1st Corps (Istanbul	7 battalions	7 regiments	4 regiments	2 regiments	1 brigade
2nd Corps (Danube)	6 battalions	7 regiments	4 regiments	1 regiment	1 company
3rd Corps (Bulgaria)	9 battalions	11 regiments	4 regiments	4 regiments	1 company
4th Corps (Anatolia)	6 battalions	6 regiments	3 regiments	1 regiment	1 company
5th Corps (Syria)	7 battalions	7 regiments	4 regiments 6 camel squadrons	1 regiment	1 company
6th Corps (Baghdad)	6 battalions	6 regiments	2 regiments	1 regiment	
7th Corps (Yemen)	5 battalions	5 regiments		1 regiment	

=== 1908 ===
In 1908, the First Army was in Constantinople and the Bosporus, and there were also units in Europe and Asia Minor. The First Army also had inspectorate functions for four reserve divisions. The Second Army headquarters was established in Adrianople, its operational area included Thrace and the Dardanelles, and it had units in Europe and Asia Minor. The Second Army also had inspectorate functions for six reserve divisions and one brigade. The Third Army's operational area comprised Western Rumelia, and it had units in Europe (specifically Albania, Kosovo, and Macedonia) and also one in Aydın (in Asia Minor); the Third Army had inspectorate functions for twelve reserve divisions. The Fourth Army's new operational area was Caucasia and its many troops were scattered along the frontier to keep an eye on the Russian Empire; the Fourth Army had inspectorate functions for four reserve divisions.

=== 1909 ===
Officially, the Army's effective peacetime strength was estimated at 700,620, of which 583,200 were infantry, 55,300 were cavalry, and 54,720 were artillery. There were 174 field and 22 mountain batteries. Of that, the total active army (260,000) contained 320 battalions of infantry, 203 squadrons of cavalry and 248 6-gun batteries of artillery. The reserve (120,000) contained 374 battalions of infantry, 666 supplemental and incomplete battalions, and 48 cavalry squadrons.

=== 1910 ===
In 1910, the empire was divided into seven army corps districts. These were Istanbul, Edirne, İzmir, Erzincan, Damascus, Baghdad, and Sanaa. There were also two independent divisions, Medina and Tripoli, and a number of divisions, each consisting of three regiments, nine battalions, and a training battalion.

=== 1911 ===
The 1909 military reformation included the creation of corps level headquarters. In 1911, the First Army was headquartered in Harbiye, and the Second Army was headquartered in Thessaloniki and responsible for the Balkans and control over forces in Syria and Palestine; it also had the first of two inspectorates. The Third Army was headquartered in Erzincan and the Fifth Army's headquarters were in Baghdad; it had the second inspectorate.

=== 1912 ===
In 1912, the First Army was in Thrace, the Second Army was in the Balkans, the Third Army was in Caucasus, the Fourth Army was in Mesopotamia, the VIII Corps was in Syria, and XIV Corps was in Arabia and Yemen.

Disposition of Units 1912

=== 1913 ===
In 1913, the positions of the forces remained the same, but the original First army degraded during First Balkan Wars.

=== 1914 ===
Before the Ottoman Empire entered World War I, the four armies divided their forces into corps and divisions so that each division had three infantry regiments and an artillery regiment. The main units were the First Army with fifteen divisions; the Second Army (headquartered in Aleppo and commanding two corps made up of two divisions) with 4 divisions plus an independent infantry division with three infantry regiments and an artillery brigade; the Third Army with nine divisions, four independent infantry regiments, and four independent cavalry regiments (tribal units); and the Fourth Army with four divisions. The reserve system had been done away with, so the plan was to have reserve soldiers fill out active units rather than constitute separate units. In August 1914, of 36 infantry divisions organized, fourteen were established from scratch and were essentially new divisions. In a very short time, eight of these newly recruited divisions went through major redeployment.

By November 1914, the Second Army was moved to Istanbul and commanded the V and VI Corps, each composed of three divisions. The Ottoman concentration plan shifted major forces to European Thrace and established the defense of straits. The First and Second army were located in this region. The Third army acquired new supplies for a winter offense. The force in Palestine (VIII Corps) was replaced with the Army in Mesopotamia.

Disposition of Units 1912

=== 1915 ===
On March 24, 1915, and September 5, 1915, the 5th and 6th Armies were established, respectively. In February 1915, the defense of the straits was reorganized. The Second Army had responsibility for the south and east coasts. It later provided troops to the reinforce the men fighting on the Gallipoli peninsula, but otherwise played no further role.

=== 1916 ===
In March 1916, the decision was made to deploy the Second Army to the Caucasus campaign. The Second Army was made up of veterans of the Gallipoli campaign as well as two new divisions. Due to the poor state of the Ottoman rail network, it took a long time to move the forces.

=== 1917 ===
On August 12, 1917, and 2 October 1917, the 7th and 8th Armies were established, respectively.

The Second Army was deactivated on 4 February 1918. It was later reactivated and commanded rear area troops, including labor units in Anatolia.

== See also ==
- Ottoman stormtroopers

== Bibliography ==
- Erickson, Edward (2013). Ottomans and Armenians: A Study in Counterinsurgency. Palgrave Macmillan. ISBN 978-1-137-36220-9.
- Erickson, Edward (2001). Order to Die: A History of the Ottoman Army in the First World War. Palgrave Macmillan. ISBN 978-0-313-31516-9.
- Erickson, Edward (2003). Defeat in Detail: The Ottoman Army in the Balkans, 1912–1913. Westport: Palgrave Macmillan. ISBN 978-0-275-97888-4.
- McDowall, David (2004). A Modern History of the Kurds. I. B. Tauris. ISBN 978-1-85043-416-0.
- Nicolle, David (2008). The Ottomans: Empire of Faith. Thalamus Publishing. ISBN 978-1-902886-11-4.
- Kara, Hidayet (2020). Sultan II. Abdülhamid Dönemi Osmanlı Kara Ordusu (1876-1908) (in Turkish). Türk Tarih Kurumu. ISBN 9789751744463.
- U.K. War Office, General Staff. 1914. Handbook of the Turkish Army; Prepared in the Intelligence Division of the War Office by Captain M.C.P. Ward, Intelligence Section, Cairo. 8th provisional edition. Cairo, Egypt: Government Press.
