= Gustav von Oppen =

Officer in Imperial German Army (1867–1918)

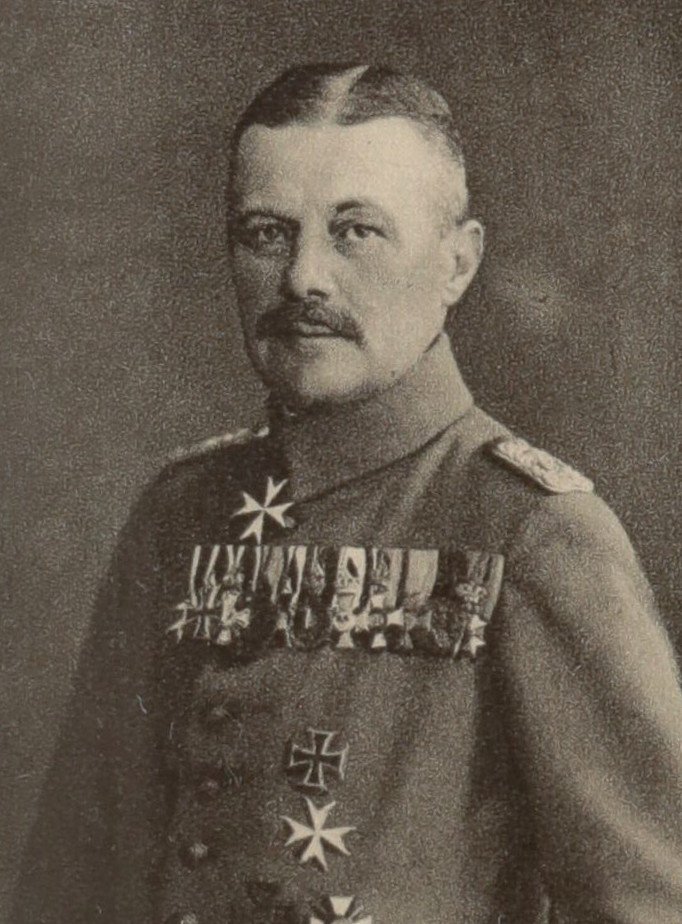
- Born: 26 June 1867; Sorau in Niederlausitz, German Empire (modern-day Żary, Poland)
- Died: 31 October 1918 (aged 51) Pozantı, Turkey
- Buried: Hanover, Germany
- Allegiance: German Empire
- Branch: Prussian Army
- Rank: Oberst
- Conflicts: World War I: Western Front; Battle of Charleroi; First Battle of the Marne; Battle of Les Éparges; Battle of the Somme; Battle of Arras; Battle of Passchendaele; Sinai and Palestine campaign; Battle of Nablus; Battle of Tulkarm; Battle of Tabsor; Battle of Samakh; Battle of Arara; Capture of Damascus; Pursuit to Haritan
- Awards: Royal House Order of Hohenzollern; Order of the Crown; Pour le Mérite

Gustav von Oppen (26 June 1867 – 31 October 1918) was the German commander of the Asia Corps in the First World War. He appeared a number of times in Ernst Jünger's Storm of Steel in his previous command of the 73rd Hanoverian Fusilier Regiment.

== Biography ==
=== Origin ===
Von Oppen was born in Sorau (now Żary, Poland) to Friedrich Wilhelm Gustav von Oppen (1834–1870) and Philippine von Borkowski (1834–1870). His father died of his wounds sustained during the Battle of Spicheren.

=== Military career ===
After attending the cadet corps, von Oppen was commissioned as a Leutnant in the 1st Thuringian Infantry Regiment No. 31 on 18 March 1886. Promoted to Oberleutnant in 1893, he served as battalion and regimental adjutant, and became adjutant of the 24th Infantry Brigade in 1898. He was promoted to Hauptmann in 1900 and later commanded a company in the 2nd Thuringian Infantry Regiment No. 32. In 1905, he attended a course at the Infantry Firing School and was appointed an honorary knight of the Order of St. John. Promoted to Major in 1908, he served as adjutant of the 6th Division and the II Army Corps from 1909 to 1912. He subsequently commanded a battalion of the Oldenburg Infantry Regiment No. 91 and was promoted to Oberstleutnant on 22 April 1914.

==== World War I ====
At the outbreak of the World War I, von Oppen's regiment was initially assigned to coastal defense before advancing into neutral Belgium in August 1914, where it fought around Liège and near Charleroi. On 31 August 1914, von Oppen was appointed commander of the Füsilier-Regiment Nr. 73, taking part in the fighting at Petit Morin, the retreat from the Marne, Battle of Les Éparges and trench warfare near Monchy-Douchy. In 1916, he fought in the Battle of the Somme and helped repel a French attack at the St. Pierre Vaast Forest, for which he was awarded the Knight's Cross of the House Order of Hohenzollern with Swords. Promoted to Oberst on 27 January 1917, he led his regiment during the retreat to the Siegfried Line, the Battle of Arras, and the Battle of Passchendaele, where he helped repel a major British attack. He also temporarily commanded the 221st Infantry Brigade and was awarded the Order of the Crown, 2nd Class with Swords. Suffering from severe rheumatism, he was eventually relieved of command and admitted to a military hospital.

On 21 January 1918, he became commander of the 201st Infantry Brigade, which was deployed to the Balkans. In June 1918, the brigade was incorporated into the Asia Corps, which was active during the Sinai and Palestine campaign. When British forces launched an attack on Nablus in mid-September 1918, von Oppen defended with only three battalions and two batteries. He had to retreat against the advance of the Allied forces in several occasions to avoid encirclement.

=== Death ===
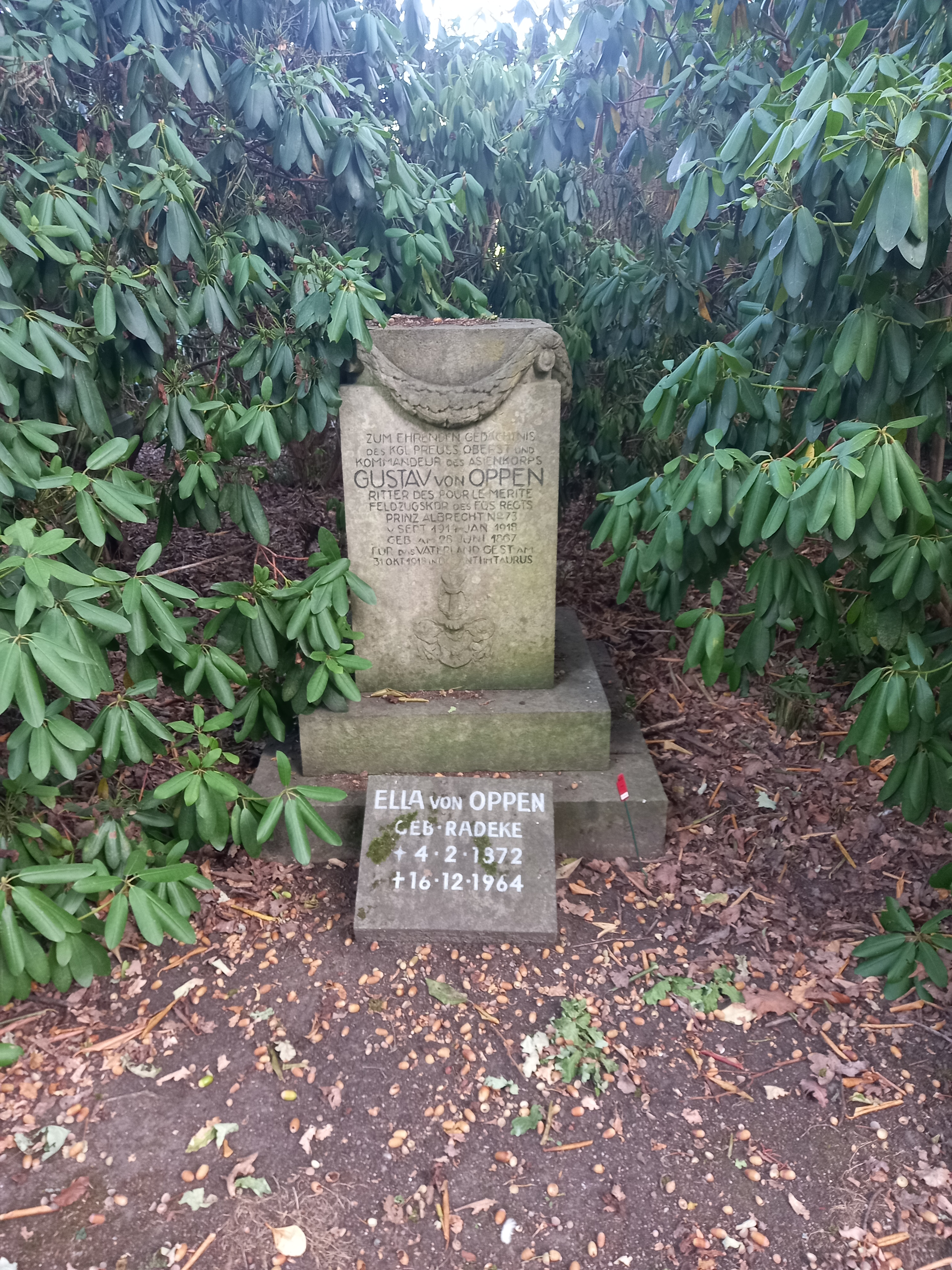
The grave of Gustav von Oppen and his wife Ella in the Stadtfriedhof Stöcken cemetery in Hanover

He died of cholera in Pozantı while the Asia Corps was retreating from enemy forces. On November 1, 1918, he was posthumously awarded the Pour le Mérite, the highest Prussian decoration for gallantry by order of Kaiser Wilhelm II on the advice of his cabinet.

== Bibliography ==
- Erickson, Edward J. (2001). Ordered to die: a history of the Ottoman army in the First World War. Greenwood Publishing Group. ISBN 0-313-31516-7.
- Falls, Cyril (1930). Military Operations Egypt & Palestine from June 1917 to the End of the War. Official History of the Great War Based on Official Documents by Direction of the Historical Section of the Committee of Imperial Defence: Volume 2 Part II. A. F. Becke (maps). London: H.M. Stationery Office. OCLC 256950972.
- Jünger, Ernst (1929). Storm of Steel. Translated by Creighton, Basil.
- Jünger, Ernst (2001). Berggötz, Sven Olaf (ed.). Politische Publizistik 1919 bis 1933 (in German). Klett-Cotta. ISBN 9783608935509.
- Möller, Hanns (1935). "M–Z". Geschichte der Ritter des Ordens «Pour le mérite» im Weltkrieg (in German). Vol. II. Berlin: Verlag Bernard & Graefe.
- Stein, Oliver (2018). Nachrichtendienstoffizier im Osmanischen Reich: Ernst Adolf Muellers Kriegseinsatz und Gefangenschaft im Vorderen Orient 1915–1919 (in German). Ergon Verlag. ISBN 9783956504372.
