= Douchy-lès-Ayette =

- Commune
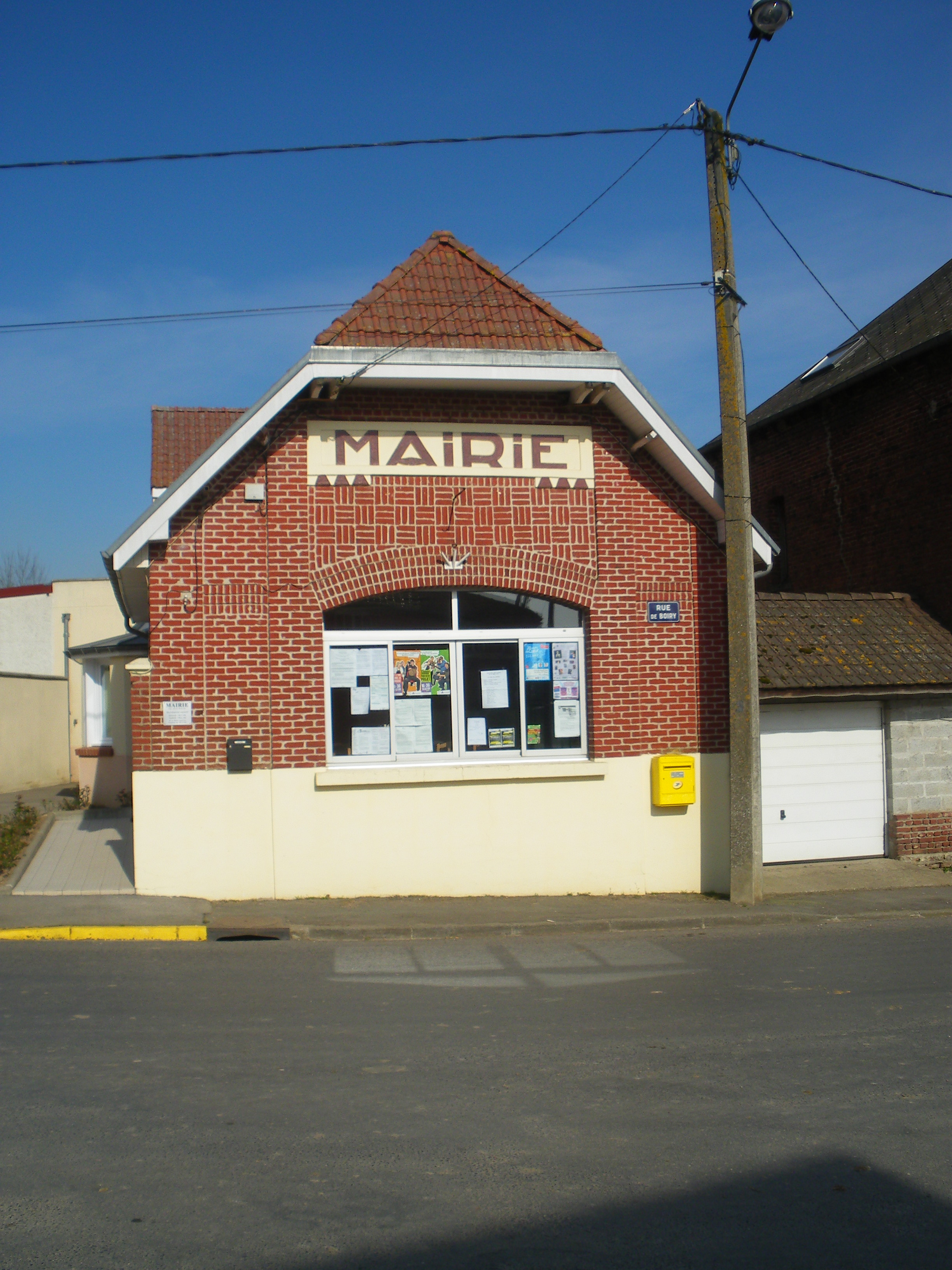
- The town hall of Douchy-lès-Ayette

- Coat of arms
- Location of Douchy-lès-Ayette
- Location within France Location within Hauts-de-France
- Coordinates: 50°10′37″N 2°43′05″E
- Country: France
- Region: Hauts-de-France
- Department: Pas-de-Calais
- Arrondissement: Arras
- Canton: Bapaume
- Intercommunality: CC Sud-Artois

Government
  - Mayor (2020–2026): Jean-Charles Derue
- Area^{1}: 5.5 km^{2} (2.1 sq mi)
- Elevation: 106 m (348 ft)
- Highest elevation: 147 m (482 ft)
- Lowest elevation: 92 m (302 ft)
- Population (2023): 286
  - Density: 52/km^{2} (130/sq mi)
- Time zone: UTC+01:00 (CET)
  - Summer (DST): UTC+02:00 (CEST)
- INSEE/Postal code: 62272 /62116
- ^{1} French Land Register data, which excludes lakes, ponds, glaciers > 1 km^{2} (0.386 sq mi or 247 acres) and river estuaries.

Douchy-lès-Ayette is a commune in the Pas-de-Calais department in the Hauts-de-France region of France 9 miles (14 km) south of Arras.

== Population ==
Historical population
Year	Pop.	±% p.a.
1968	309	—
1975	288	−1.00%
1982	295	+0.34%
1990	321	+1.06%
1999	312	−0.32%
2007	317	+0.20%
2012	299	−1.16%
2017	308	+0.59%
2023	286	−1.23%
Source: INSEE

== History ==
=== Ancien Régime ===
Under the Ancien Régime, in 1789 Douchy formed part of the military government of Arras and was governed by the customary law of Artois. Its parish church belonged to the Diocese of Arras, within the deanery of Croisilles, the district of Neuville-Vitasse, and the chapelry of Ayette. It was dedicated to Saint Vaast.

Saint Vaast Church before the First World War

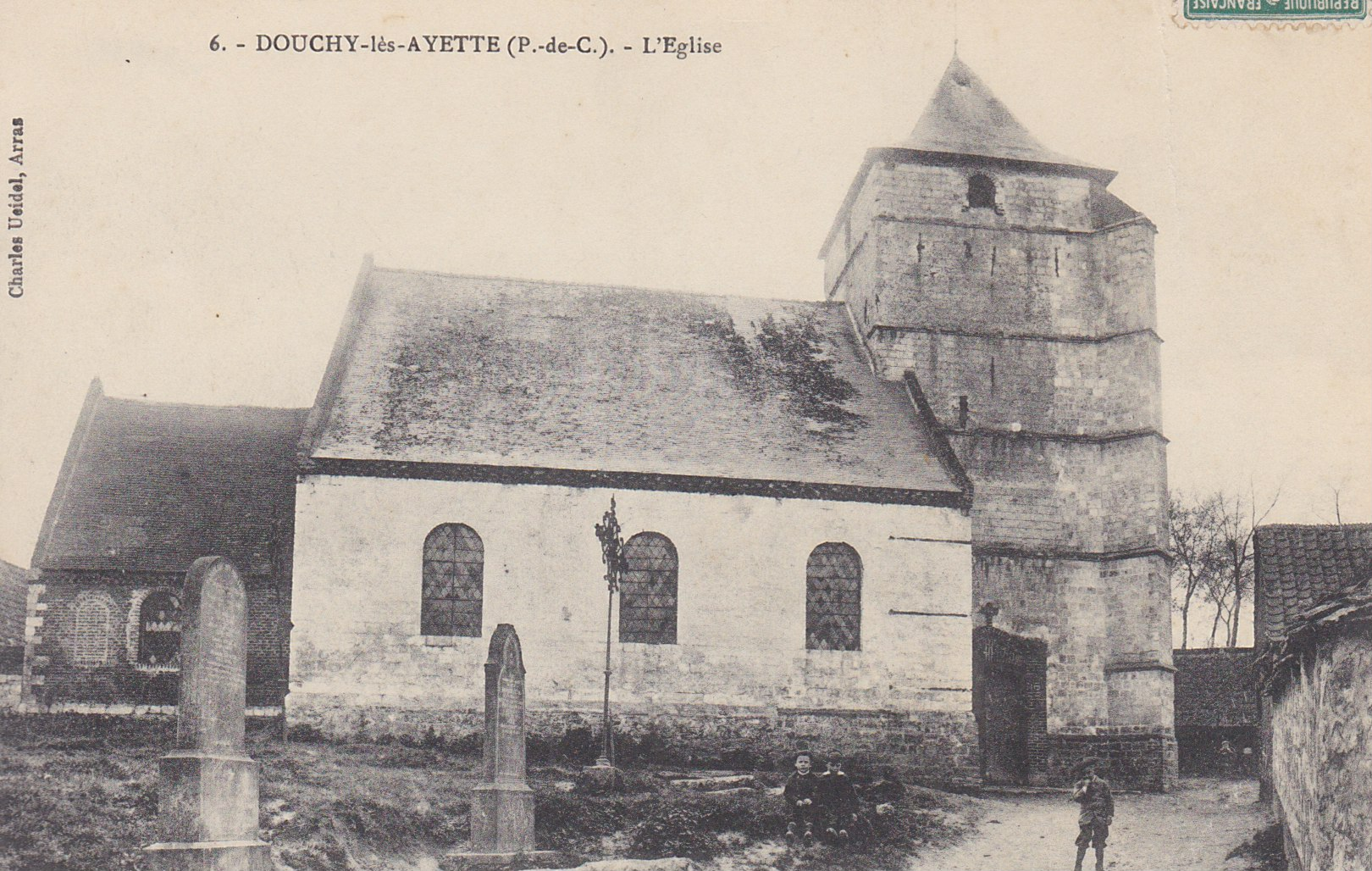
The original...

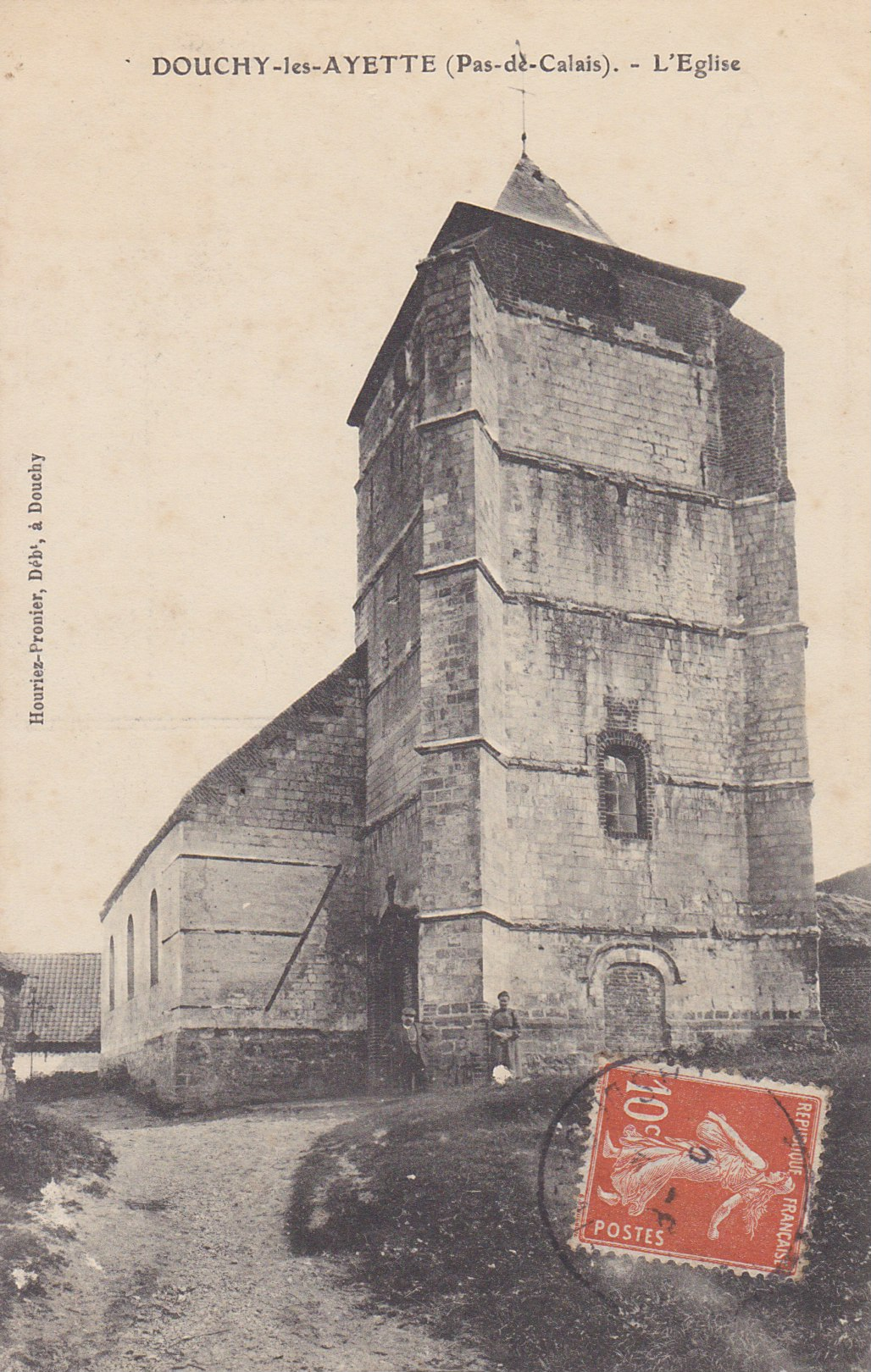
...church.

=== First World War ===
During the First World War, Douchy-lès-Ayette lay on the Western Front. In his autobiographical memoir Storm of Steel, the former German soldier Ernst Jünger describes, at the beginning of the book in the chapter "Douchy and Monchy", the German occupation of Douchy-lès-Ayette between September 1915 and 1917 and its transformation into a garrison town by the 73rd Fusilier Regiment of the 111th Infantry Division. He recounts how all the notable locations in the village were adapted for military use. The neighbouring village of Monchy-au-Bois is likewise described as lying on the front line and consequently being heavily fortified during the conflict. Opposing the Germans in this sector were British forces, including a Hindostan Royal Leicestershire Regiment. The German occupation lasted from October 1914 until 21 March 1917.

During the occupation, the Germans established a cinema in the village as well as a military cemetery, and erected a German military memorial.

The village was considered destroyed by the end of the war and was awarded the Croix de guerre 1914–1918 on 23 September 1920, an honour also bestowed upon 276 other communes in the Pas-de-Calais department.

The village was rebuilt by the Société coopérative de reconstruction de Douchy-lès-Ayette, which operated from 1919 to 1932. Its architects were Maurice Fretellière and Henri Philippe, the latter of whom also contributed to the reconstruction of Arras.

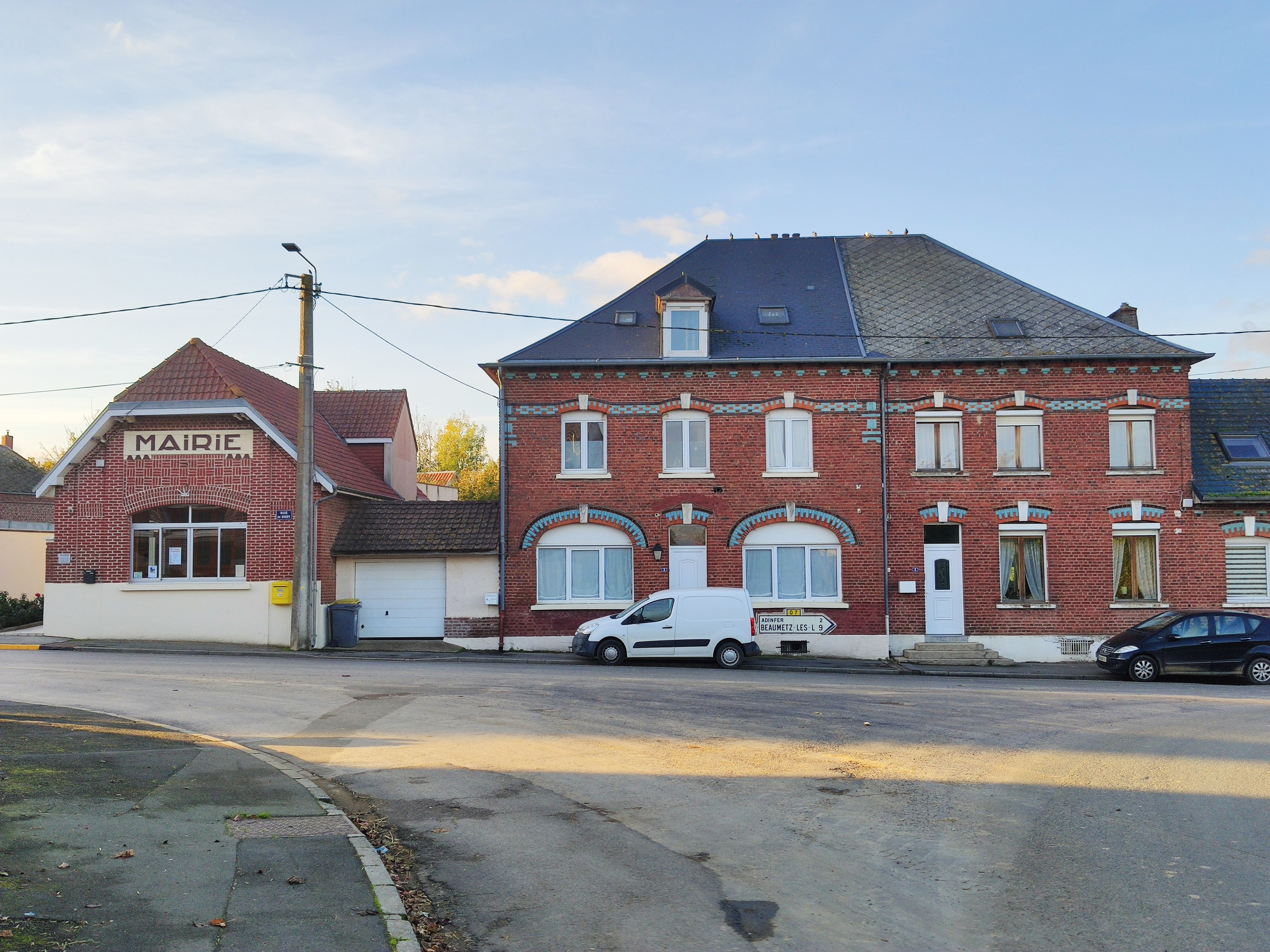
Buildings constructed during the post-war reconstruction.

== See also ==
- Communes of the Pas-de-Calais department

== Sources ==
- Jünger, Ernst (1929). Storm of Steel. Translated by Creighton, Basil. London: Chatto and Windus.
