= 73rd Hanoverian Fusilier Regiment =

Infantry regiment of the German Imperial Army

- Füsilier-Regiment Generalfeldmarschall Prinz Albrecht von Preußen (Hannoversches) Nr. 73
- Active: 1866–1919
- Country: Kingdom of Prussia
- Allegiance: German Empire (from 1871)
- Branch: Prussian Army
- Type: Infantry
- Role: Fusilier

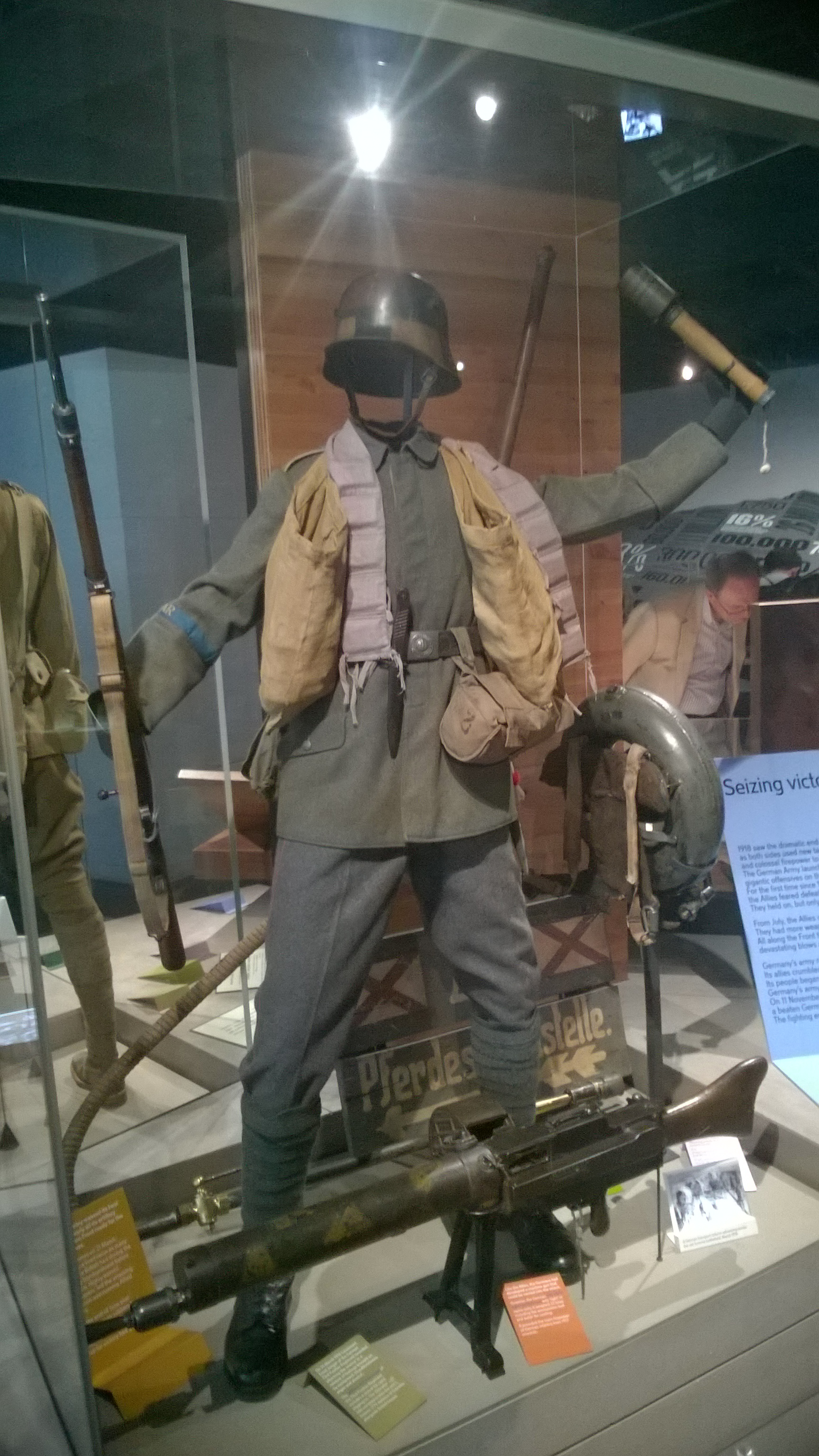
Uniform in First World War in Imperial War Museum

The 73rd Hanoverian Fusilier Regiment was an infantry regiment of the Imperial German Army. It was founded as a unit of the Prussian Army in 1866 following Prussia's annexation of the Kingdom of Hanover.

Its full German name was Füsilier-Regiment Generalfeldmarschall Prinz Albrecht von Preußen (Hannoversches).

Their regimental traditions included a brassard with Gibraltar in gold commemorating the role of Hanoverian troops in the Great Siege of Gibraltar.

Notable soldiers in the regiment included:

- The poet Hermann Löns was killed while serving with the regiment in September 1914.
- The author Ernst Jünger fought with the regiment from December 1914 until the end of the war, and his memoir Storm of Steel was based on his time there.
- The artist Kurt Schwitters was conscripted into the regiment in 1917 but was exempted the same year.
- For much of the First World War the regiment was commanded by Colonel Gustav von Oppen who would later command the Asia Corps.

== See Also ==
- 19th Division (German Empire)
- List of Imperial German infantry regiments
- 111th Infantry Division (German Empire)

== Bibliography ==
- Breyding, Emil; von Kortzfleisch, Gustav (1891). Geschichte des Füsilier-Regiments General-Feldmarschall Prinz Albrecht von Preussen (Hannoversches) Nr. 73: 1866–1891 (in German). Berlin: R. Eisenschmidt.
- Jünger, Ernst (1929). Storm of Steel. Translated by Creighton, Basil.
