= Second raid on the Suez Canal =

Ottoman offensive on the Suez Canal

- Part of Sinai and Palestine Campaign of World War I
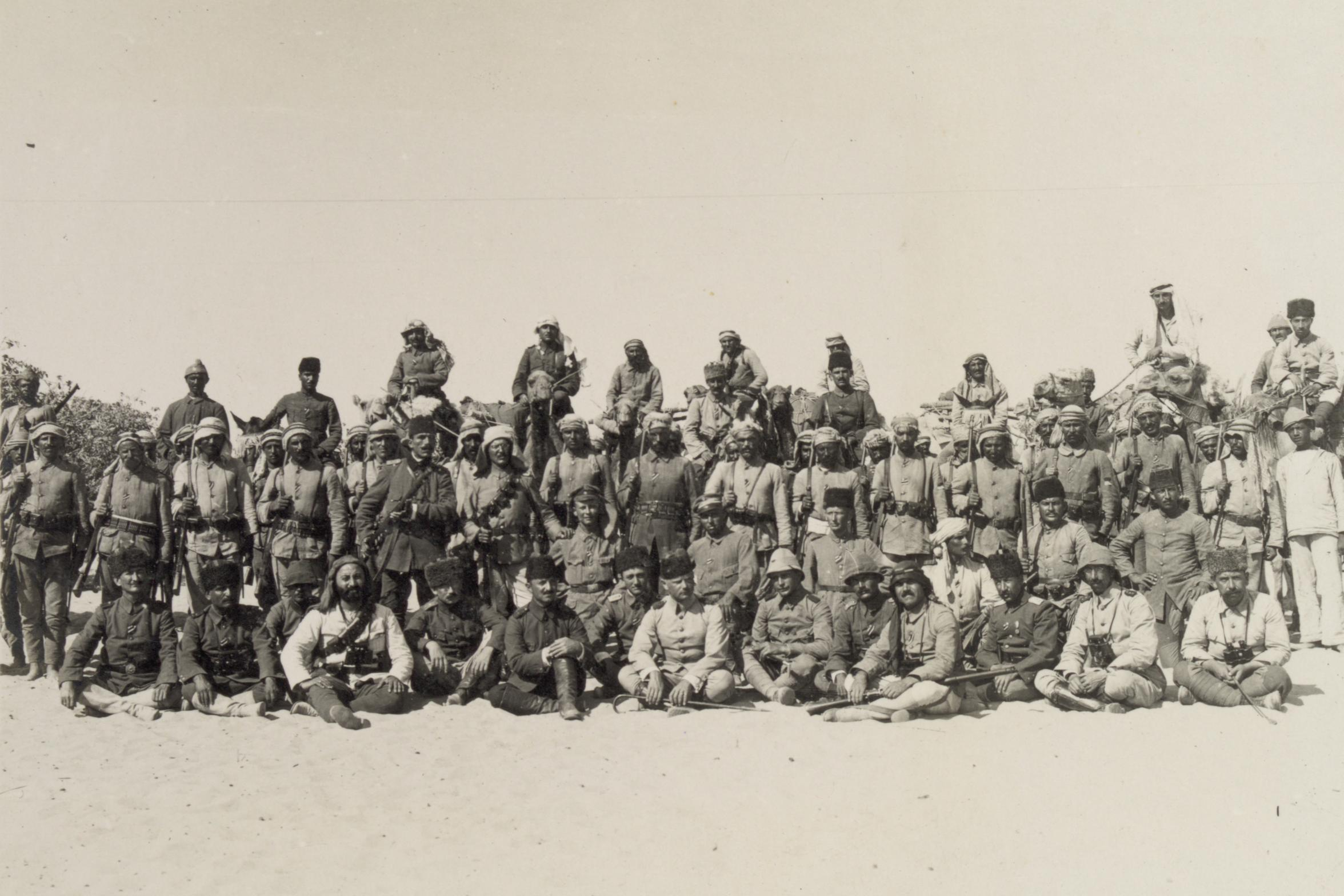
- German General Kress von Kressenstein with Ottoman and German staff officers and enlisted personnel (El Arish, 1916)
Date	23 April – 5 August 1916 (3 months, 1 week and 6 days)
Location	Sinai Peninsula (Oghratina, Katia and Duidar east of the Suez Canal), Sultanate of Egypt
Result	Inconclusive: See Aftermath and Impact

Belligerents
Central Power: Ottoman Empire; German Empire	Allied Power: British Empire; United Kingdom; Australia; New Zealand

Commanders and leaders
(Ottoman Empire) Djemal Pasha (German Empire) F. K. von Kressenstein (Ottoman Empire) Mersinli Djemal Pasha (German Empire) W. von Frankenberg	(United Kingdom) Sir John Maxwell (United Kingdom) Archibald Murray (United Kingdom) Edgar Askin Wiggin (Australia) Harry Chauvel (United Kingdom) Herbert Lawrence

Units involved
(Ottoman Empire) Fourth Army; XXII Corps; 3rd Division; (German Empire) Asien-Korps; Pascha I	(Australia) ANZAC Corps; 2 Infantry Brigades; 2 Cavalry Brigades

Strength
199,850 personnel, 24,500 animals, 19,375 camels, Armament: 101,850 small arms (including 39,189 Mausers, 19,859 Russian rifles, 21,000 Martins, 24,816 obsolete weapons, and 58,000 older models), 75 machine guns and 244 artillery pieces. (Note: Turkish General Staff ATASE Archives, K. 168, D. 730, F. 30, 2 June 1332 (15 June 1916).)	450,000 total personnel (Note: Larcher writes that there were 152,000 combatants and a ration strength of 195,000, and that the number of combatants was increased by about 20,000. In a note added to his work, Lieutenant Colonel Nihat summarizes the British forces in Egypt and Syria as follows: 197,000 British, 93,000 Indian, and 160,000 laborers, totaling 450,000 personnel. This final figure is consistent with the numbers provided by Allenby and Robertson.)

The second raid on the Suez Canal was the second operation conducted by the Ottoman Empire against the Suez Canal during the Sinai and Palestine Campaign of World War I. The objective of the operation was to pin British forces down in Egypt to prevent their deployment to the Western Front and, if possible, to liberate Egypt. It was anticipated that if the canal were crossed, Egyptian nationalists would revolt against the British alongside the Ottoman army. The operation was to be carried out under the command of Djemal Pasha, commander of the Fourth Army and Minister of the Navy.

The offensive took place on 27 July 1916 with a force of 10,000 men under the command of the German Miralay (Colonel) Friedrich Kress von Kressenstein, who was serving in the Fourth Army. However, after suffering a severe defeat, the Ottoman forces were compelled to retreat to El Arish.

== Background ==
By the end of 1915 it had become clear that the Turks were likely to make a second attempt on the canal. A series of Turkish victories in Mesopotamia and in Gallipoli late that year seemed to signal a change, if only temporary, in the balance of power in the Middle East. Discussions about a British withdrawal from Gallipoli began in October and by the end of 1915 the British had abandoned their attempt to force the Dardanelles. The final departure of the Allied army from Gallipoli opened the way to preparations for another Turkish assault on the canal.

Turkey had never abandoned the idea of a second attack: in parliament Enver Pasha represented the first invasion as no more than a highly successful reconnaissance in strength in preparation for a much larger offensive to be undertaken at a later date. The key to a successful second invasion was to be an improved transport system. In the autumn of 1914, the Turkish railhead in Palestine had reached as far as Sileh, some 275 miles from the canal. Under the supervision of Meissner Pasha, by November 1915 the railway had been extended from Sileh to Beersheba (and by May 1916 was to reach to El Auja and beyond). This greatly improved network suffered from one major flaw: the need to transfer supplies from standard gauge to narrow gauge at Rayak en route from Istanbul. The alternative supply route from the imperial capital was a road that crossed the Taurus and Amanus mountains.

In the first part of the war this major route was upgraded so that by 1916 it could take motor transport. von Kressenstein’s view was that "from the first day of the war to the last, the lines of communication worked badly, and to this must be largely attributed the series of disasters which befell the Turks in Iraq, Palestine and the Hedjaz".

Other military developments were also encouraging the Turks in their preparations for a second invasion. The British campaign in Mesopotamia had run into difficulties and had suffered a serious defeat at Ctesiphon in November 1915. The British were soon to be faced also with the possibility that another theatre of war—Thessaloniki—could open up in the east as Bulgaria made clear its support for the Turks. The Turks were now in a position to release troops from these fronts to help create a new expeditionary force for a renewed attack on Egypt. The defeat of Serbia by the Central Powers in the autumn of 1915 also enabled the Germans to open a supply line running directly from Germany to the Middle East. However, the tide was not turning entirely in Turkey’s favour. A new Russian offensive in the Caucasus early in 1916 caused reserves to be diverted to this front, so reducing the number of troops that could be spared for operations against Egypt.

== Prelude ==
=== Reorganization of forces in Egypt ===
The British policy toward a possible second attack was slowly taking shape. Maxwell had informed Kitchener in October that in the event of a new invasion, the response would be "similar to that of February 1915, except for organizing a counterattack, which he was unable to do due to water shortages and the nature of the orders he received." By the end of 1915, the War Office decided to reinforce the troops guarding the Channel by sending additional divisions from the United Kingdom. The forces evacuated from Gallipoli and sent to Egypt for a period of rest and recuperation also increased the numbers. Although they were thot to be useful in the event of a Turkish invasion, these units were understaffed, and in the short term, over-relying on these battalions, which had suffered heavy casualties against the determined Turkish forces, would clearly have been imprudent. The scale of the task of bringing the Gallipoli veterans to full combat readiness was described by Sergeant Harold Clark of the Middlesex Regiment, who arrived in Egypt from Gallipoli in December 1915. From Alexandria, they were transferred to a two-division accommodation camp located north of Cairo, with extensive grounds for training and rest: "... The regiments were arriving in droves every day, and after Christmas, another division arrived... This was an operation that the Commander-in-Chief, his staff, and the supply services richly deserved credit for. Transporting, feeding, and re-equipping approximately 100,000 men was a colossal task, and achieving it with minimal disruption, as they did, was highly commendable. Transporting, feeding, and re-equipping approximately 100,000 men was a colossal task, and achieving it with minimal disruption, as they did, was highly commendable."

At the beginning of 1916, 14 infantry divisions, several cavalry brigades, and local yeomanry brigades had arrived in Egypt. When the rest and recuperation processes were complete, Egypt would have far more troops than it would need. The War Office did not see Egypt as the permanent station for these troops; it considered them a strategic reserve force ready to be dispatched to other fronts where reinforcements were needed. However, the temporary winter quarters in Egypt allowed the military authorities to reconsider the idea of an allied landing at Ayas, west of the Gulf of Iskenderun. One of the reasons for the revival of this idea was John Maxwell belief that the Gallipoli evacuation would lead to "disastrous consequences both morally and materially" unless England delivered a severe blow to Turkey elsewhere. Although there were obvious advantages to cutting the Turks' communication lines with Iraq and Syria, the scale of the naval and ground forces required and the risk of failure were equally significant. Kitchener was reluctant on this matter, and the arguments put forth by the French against this idea—decisive ones—reflected the concern of British soldiers about being in a region they viewed as their sphere of influence after the war. England's struggle with Turkey would continue to be based on the defense of the Suez Canal.

=== Strength of British forces ===
Discrepancies exist regarding the total strength of British forces in Egypt and Palestine during the period. Major Larcher states that there were 152,000 combatants with a ration strength of 195,000, noting that the number of combatants was subsequently increased by approximately 20,000. However, in a supplementary note to Larcher's work, Lieutenant Colonel Nihat calculates the total British force in Egypt and Syria as follows:

Close to these higher estimates, Ottoman intelligence reported in a 7 March 1916 ciphered telegram from the legation in Bern that the British force concentrated in Egypt had reached 400,000 personnel and was still being reinforced. The report also warned that this buildup could support an Allied landing on the Syrian coast, such as at İskenderun, to cut off Ottoman forces in Iraq and Syria.

- 197,000 British personnel
- 93,000 Indian personnel
- 160,000 laborers

The resulting total of 450,000 personnel aligns with the figures provided by Generals Allenby and Robertson.

=== Ottoman preparations ===
As the primary step for the Second Suez Offensive, Djemal Pasha established a desert command in Ibin, headed by Kress von Kressenstein. This was intended both to manage harassment operations against the Canal and to secure the logistical preparations being undertaken in the desert. Continuing his efforts, Djemal Pasha prepared an extensive twenty-six-article report on 14/15 June 1915 to be submitted to the Acting Commander-in-Chief (Ottoman Turkish: Başkumandan Vekili). In said report, the conditions necessary for the execution of a new canal operation were summarized as follows:

- The order of battle for the Egyptian mobile army has been established; according to this order of battle, the mobile army consists of 57 infantry battalions, 20 machine gun companies, 8 cavalry or camel corps companies, and 23 batteries.
- The occupation forces for Syria and Palestine must be organized as follows:
  - One division of 9 battalions each for the Aleppo and Adana sectors.
  - One division of 6 battalions for the Lebanon sector.
  - One corps consisting of two divisions for the Palestine sector (each division consisting of 9 battalions).
  - An additional division to serve as a reserve.
- The fact that the British did not invade Syria and Palestine during the First Suez Offensive does not guarantee they will not do so during the Second. On the contrary, it is probable they will attack to seize the Egyptian railway, which is very close to the coast. Therefore, an excellent Turkish Division is required.
- It is essential to ensure that the daily subsistence of the army, which will remain in front of the Canal for an extended period, is regularly dispatched from the terminal railway point to the Canal, and to ensure that one month's reserve provisions are stored in desert warehouses before operations commence. Based on this principle, two Desert Stage Inspectorates (Menzil Müfettişliği) will be established in Beersheba and Ibin. 5. In accordance with the first and third articles, the quantity of wagons and camels required for the transport of provisions and ammunition from both the operational zone and desert warehouses has been determined.
- In addition to existing materials, new supplies must reach Beersheba by 1 November 1331 (14 November 1915) from Istanbul.
- For urgent transport, automobile units consisting of 120 vehicles each must be established. Along with these vehicles, gasoline and repair crews must also be sent. I request 4,156 wagons, deducting from the previously requested 4,656.
- Stage organizations will be utilized for water requirements in the desert. Furthermore, materials necessary for water transport must reach Damascus by 1 October 1331 (14 October 1915).
- Equipment and gear to be sent from Germany must reach Damascus by 1 October 1331 (14 October 1915). 10. I request that the aviation detachment and wireless telegraph personnel be carefully selected from among the Germans.
- Due to the special importance of the Egyptian Expedition, I deem the addition of the following command echelons to the army essential.
- The army headquarters is extremely deficient.
- In all probability, the army will remain before the Suez Canal for weeks during the operation.
- The command structure for the Second Suez Offensive was established with a focus on officers who had participated in the previous campaign. Accordingly, Fakhri Pasha was appointed to the command of the Syrian Mobile Force, while the commander of the 8th Army, (Mersinli) Djemal Pasha, was assigned to the Palestine Defense Force. Additionally, Friedrich Kress von Kressenstein (Von Kress Bey) was placed in command of the First Expeditionary Force.
- The camel issue constitutes the basis of all preparations. I request the dispatch of funds for the fulfillment of this task. Furthermore, medical supplies, medical officers, and veterinarians must be sent.
- The points I have submitted are the minimum requirements to ensure the execution of the Egyptian Expedition."

Figures of requests in Djemal Pasha's report to the Acting Supreme Command
	Wagons	Camels
For the desert cadre		4,460
For water transport		9,392
For provision transport	4,786	14,667
For ammunition transport	1,533	4,509
To be stationed at various points in the desert		3,000
10% Reserve allocation		3,603
5% Reserve allocation	316	
Total	6,635	39,631

Djemal Pasha, meticulously continuing preparations for the Second Suez Offensive, sent a new report to Enver Pasha on 21 July 1915 after his previous requests were not met, reiterating his demands for camels, funds, Decauville railways, and water equipment. Djemal Pasha, while at his summer residence in Ayn Sofar, detailed information regarding the desert stage organization, aviation-wireless-telegraph detachments, personnel strength, and weekly provision amounts in reports dated 27 July – 4 August addressed to Enver Pasha. Under the conditions of the time, it appeared quite difficult for the Ottoman Government to meet the Pasha's demands. Therefore, Djemal Pasha believed that a new Canal Operation could not be realized without the assistance of the Allied powers, particularly Germany, while conversely, the Germans would derive greater benefits from such an operation. The Pasha expressed his thoughts on this matter in a telegram sent to the Acting Commander-in-Chief (Ottoman Turkish: Başkumandan Vekili) on 28 August 1915: "...If it is taken into consideration that Germany's interests necessitate the seizure of Egypt from the British and that Egypt will lead the British to currently unpredictable consequences, I am certain Germany will not hesitate to make great financial sacrifices." Taking action upon Djemal Pasha’s correspondence, Enver Pasha immediately dispatched Von Kressenstein to Germany to secure the necessary financial and material aid. However, likely due to the failure of the first expedition, Germany did not appear overly enthusiastic regarding aid. Nevertheless, it cannot be said that Germany remained entirely indifferent. The Germans contributed to the Second Suez Offensive—which they termed the "Pasha Operation"—albeit not at the requested levels. According to the reports sent by Djemal Pasha to the Acting Commander-in-Chief (Ottoman Turkish: Başkumandan Vekili), these aids can be listed as follows:

1. One aviation detachment, eight machine gun companies, one 15 cm howitzer battery, one 10 cm gun battery, one 21 cm mortar battery, four anti-aircraft sections.
2. Two field hospitals under the administration of German officers.
3. 140 officers and 1,500 enlisted men. 4. German maps of the Suez Canal and its surroundings at a scale of 1:250,000, printed in 1915 and titled "To Djemal Pasha."

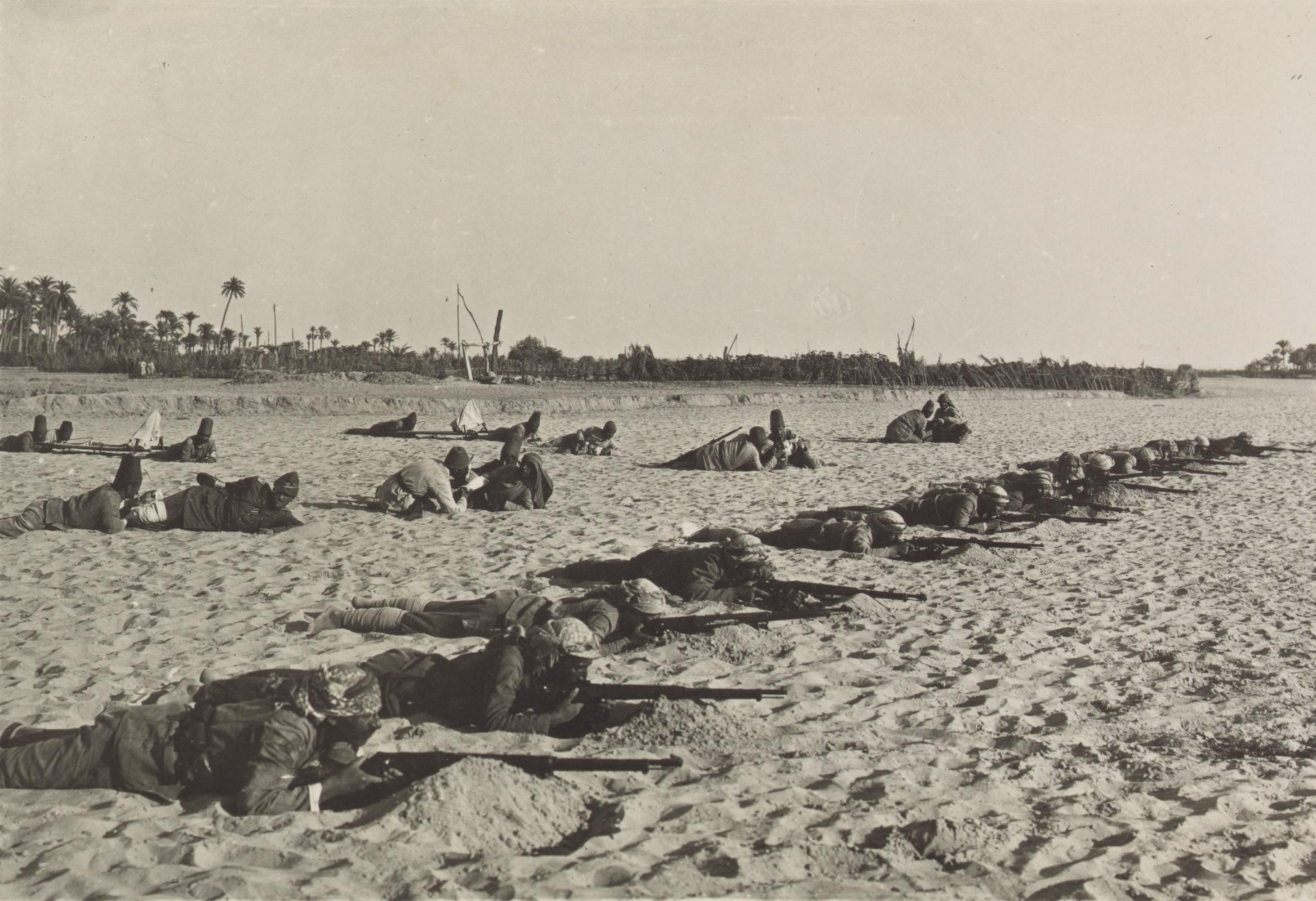
Ottoman maneuvers (El Arish, 1916)

Railways held a significant place in Djemal Pasha's preparations for the Second Suez Offensive. The Pasha initiated a railway project extending to the Canal to facilitate the transport of troops and materials. This project, named the "Hejaz Railway Egyptian Branch," began on 19 January 1915; starting from the Mesudiye Station of the Hejaz Railway, it aimed to reach the Suez Canal via Ramla, Jaffa, Jerusalem, Beersheba, Hafir el-Auja, and Ismailia. Additionally, German Meissner Pasha was appointed as the "Chief Engineer of the Hejaz Railway Egyptian Branch." The Egyptian Branch reached Beersheba in mid-October. Hayri Bey, the Minister of Pious Foundations and Sheikh ul-Islam, congratulated Djemal Pasha, Commander of the Fourth Army, for the construction of 159 km of railway in a short span of 10 months. Djemal Pasha's extensive experience and expertise played a major role in completing the line so quickly, in addition to the absence of expropriation issues. Work continued without interruption to complete the Beersheba-Canal section of the Egyptian Branch. The Hejaz Railway administration supported Djemal Pasha in the continuation of the project and commended his efforts. In 1916, construction accelerated, and expenditures reached 240,000 Liras by March. However, the project was forced to a halt 25 km from Ismailia due to the uprising of Sharif Hussein. In addition to railway preparations, Djemal Pasha had a 600 km macadam road built to Habra. Furthermore, starting from the Gaza-Beersheba line, he had wells dug at stage points toward the Canal, laid 38 km of water pipes from north to west, and constructed hundreds of kilometers of telegraph lines within the desert. As with the first expedition, the Pasha made preparations to form volunteer units for the second. To this end, he tasked Shakib Arslan Bey, Deputy for Hauran, with forming a volunteer regiment from local Bedouins and subsequently established the First Expeditionary Force.

Djemal Pasha, who moved the army headquarters to Jerusalem on 14 October 1915, arrived in Aleppo toward the end of the month. There, the Pasha took a close interest in the Armenians subject to the Tehcir (Deportation) Law and decided to go to Istanbul on 22 November both to discuss their situation and to find support for the Taurus-Amanos construction. However, upon reaching Pozantı, he was forced to return due to Enver Pasha's order not to come. About a week later, when he was invited to Istanbul by Enver Pasha, he set out once more. Encountering deported Armenians along the way, Djemal Pasha expressed his sorrow, remarking: "Those in Istanbul act comfortably because they do not see these." In the meeting held at the Ministry of War on 5 December, Enver Pasha stated that weight would be given to the Canal following the conclusion of the Gallipoli Campaign, while Djemal Pasha requested that the 650,000 Liras required for the operation be met as soon as possible, though he received no definitive answer. Following this meeting, which did not proceed as he wished, Djemal Pasha was received by Sultan Mehmed Reşad and subsequently visited the Red Crescent Hospital. As a result of his visit to Istanbul, Djemal Pasha concluded that instead of a "Great Egyptian Expedition," only an operation limited to the Suez Canal would be conducted. Indeed, on 17 November 1915, the Enver Pasha-Falkenhayn meeting had taken place, and it was understood that Germany could not fulfill all of Djemal Pasha's requests. Despite this, Djemal Pasha desired the expedition to be carried out in February or March 1916. According to the new plan, the Canal would not be crossed; instead, Turkish forces would entrench themselves east of the Canal and harass it with artillery fire.

On the other hand, the British anticipated that the Turks would undertake a new operation against Egypt following the Gallipoli Campaign. Consequently, General Maxwell, Commander of the British forces in Egypt, claimed that the Turks were preparing for an attack with a force of 250,000 men (Note: The Ottoman Fourth Army entered a restructuring process starting in 1916. Contrary to General Maxwell's claims, the general strength of the Fourth Army as of June was as follows: 199,850 personnel, 24,500 animals, 19,375 camels, 101,850 small arms (39,189 Mausers, 19,859 Russian rifles, 21,000 Martins, 24,816 obsolete weapons, and 58,000 older models), 75 machine guns, and 244 guns. These figures are taken from reports prepared by Djemal Pasha himself. ATASE Archives, K. 168, D. 730, F. 30, 2 June 1332 (15 June 1916). In the same year, the monthly expenditure of the Fourth Army reached 350,000 Liras. However, due to economic hardships, they had to make do with an allocation of 40,000 Liras. BOA, DH.ŞFR, 65/88, 65/104, 13/15 June 1332 (26/28 June 1916).) and requested additional aid. At this time, the appointment of British General Murray, who visited Egypt, demonstrated the concern regarding the Turkish operation. The British went further, changing their defense plans and beginning to mass troops east of the Canal.

Enver Pasha, the Minister of War and Acting Commander-in-Chief (Ottoman Turkish: Başkumandan Vekili), arrived in the region in February 1916 to inspect the preparations made by Djemal Pasha and to offer his support. Djemal Pasha was highly gratified by this visit. Enver Pasha congratulated Djemal Pasha, stating: "I never thought the desert could change so much," and thanked him for his hospitality. Enver Pasha later visited Mecca and Medina with Djemal Pasha, during which he held a meeting with Sharif Hussein bin Ali, the Emir of Mecca.

On 2 June 1916, Djemal Pasha issued a five-article communiqué in French and Turkish, addressed specifically to the Command of the First Expeditionary Force. This communiqué contained statements regarding the British forces in Egypt numbering approximately 200,000, the measures to be taken to prevent enemy advances, and that any withdrawal could only be executed by order of the Fourth Army. Another objective of the communiqué was to prevent the First Expeditionary Force and its commander, Friedrich Kress von Kressenstein, from acting outside the Pasha's orders. Indeed, at this time, a jurisdictional conflict existed between Djemal Pasha and Kress von Kressenstein. This conflict had even led to some arguments between the two. For this reason, on 16 July 1916, Djemal Pasha sent a very stern telegram to Kress von Kressenstein in El-Arish. In this telegram, the Pasha stated:

Because the telegram you wrote three days ago regarding provision transport was written in language unbecoming of a corps commander toward an army commander, I only organized the provision transport. I deemed it appropriate not to write any response other than not to engage. Since you insist, here is your answer: Their Majesties the Emperors of Germany and Austria have entrusted the military forces belonging to their own armies to the command of His Majesty the Ottoman Emperor, not to your command. Since you have been appointed to the Command of the First Expeditionary Force by His Imperial Majesty, it is inappropriate for you to speak specifically of a portion of the allied forces under your command. If you forget that you are responsible only to me in all your actions and movements, I wish to remind you immediately. There is no official relationship between you and the German and Austrian military attachés; you should not doubt that I am working with all our existence to bring the transport capacity to its maximum level.

— Kress von Kressenstein - 16 July 1916 - El-Arish

Djemal Pasha continued his work without interruption until August, when the Second Suez Offensive began, and spared no sacrifice. Indeed, in his telegram to Enver Pasha on 21 July 1916, he clearly expressed these efforts: "Just as I have worked continuously for a year and a half to make the execution of the Canal operation possible, I am now working even harder to do everything necessary to ensure the continuation of this operation..." In the continuation of this telegram, the Pasha requested that ammunition and ordnance aid be sent immediately and that his sacrifices not be left unrequited.

== Battles ==
=== Katia (23 April 1916) ===
The first serious engagement of the Second Suez Offensive occurred on 23 April 1916 in Katia and its surroundings. Ottoman-German forces targeted British outposts in the Sinai, launching a sudden raid on the positions at Katia, Oghratina, and Duweidar. The British Yeomanry units under the command of General Herbert Lawrence were caught unprepared; suffering heavy losses against Ottoman cavalry charges, the British were forced to retreat. Approximately 23 officers and 257 enlisted men were taken prisoner, and many units were dispersed. This engagement was noteworthy as it demonstrated that the Ottoman army still maintained mobility in the Sinai Desert.

The raid on Katia created serious concern within the British command. As a precaution against potential new attacks on the Canal zone, fortifications were strengthened and defensive lines were expanded. Although the battle resulted in an Ottoman favor on a tactical scale, logistical difficulties and the increasing aerial reconnaissance superiority of the British limited the Ottoman advance. Nevertheless, the success at Katia revealed that the Canal Expedition had not entirely failed and that the Ottomans remained a threat on the desert line.

=== Romani (3–5 August 1916) ===
The main phase of the Second Suez Offensive took place near Romani in August 1916. In accordance with Djemal Pasha's plan, a force of approximately 10,000 men under Kressenstein's command attacked the Romani position, 40 kilometers east of the Canal, on 3 August. Ottoman-German units crossed the desert and attacked the British and ANZAC defensive lines entrenched around Wellington Ridge. However, extreme heat, long logistical distances, provision shortages due to a locust plague, and British artillery and aerial superiority halted the Ottoman advance. By 5 August, the clashes ended with the Ottoman forces retreating after suffering heavy losses.

The Battle of Romani became the turning point of the Canal Expeditions. With this victory, the British secured the Suez line and seized the initiative in the Sinai entirely. The Ottoman army was compelled to retreat to El Arish. Djemal Pasha and his staff attributed the reasons for the defeat to the excellent British defensive system, logistical difficulties, and the simultaneous outbreak of the Arab Revolt. While this defeat eliminated the Ottomans' capability to conduct large-scale offensives toward the Canal, it also paved the way for the British to begin counter-operations toward Palestine via Gaza.

== Aftermath and impact ==
In early March, Enver Pasha requested preparations to begin for the purpose of creating a threat against the Canal through written orders sent to Djemal Pasha. Meanwhile, the British changed their defensive strategy and began entrenching east of Suez. At the request of Enver and Djemal Pashas, the XXII. Corps, also known as the First Expeditionary Force, under the leadership of Von Kressenstein, conducted a reconnaissance attack on 23 April; the clashes with the British before Katia were concluded successfully. Enver Pasha congratulated Fourth Army Commander Djemal Pasha for these successes. The Battle of Katia left a great impression on Djemal Pasha and caused him to alter his strategy. In his view, this battle once again demonstrated the importance of aviation detachments. Furthermore, the establishment of a submarine base on the regional coast for the protection of Syria and Palestine had become inevitable. In his memoirs, Djemal Pasha stated that following the Battle of Katia, he approved a new attack on the Canal at Kress von Kressenstein's suggestion, provided that the defensive security of Palestine was not neglected. However, the Pasha had desired this attack himself, as he had made extensive preparations for it since the First Suez Offensive. In a telegram sent from Damascus to Enver Pasha on 15 July 1916, after stating that material and ammunition support were necessary, he expressed that despite the Sharif Hussein Rebellion in the Hejaz, he would "prefer the Canal Operation to the Hejaz Issue." Consequently, the new attack plan was prepared entirely in accordance with his own wishes. Pursuant to the Pasha's attack plan, the First Expeditionary Force under Kress von Kressenstein attacked Romani, located 40 km east of the Canal, with a force of approximately 10,000 on 2 August 1915. However, due to the strong fortification of enemy positions and heavy artillery fire, they were forced to retreat toward Sinai on 3/4 August. According to Djemal Pasha, the reasons for the Romani failure were the excellent defensive system established by the British, exposure to heavy artillery fire, and the commencement of the Sharif Hussein Rebellion. Despite this failure, the Pasha claimed that the importance of the Fourth Army in the region had increased further; therefore, in the report he sent to Enver Pasha, he requested that the Fourth Army be reinforced with two Turkish divisions against both Sharif Hussein bin Ali and British attacks.

On the other hand, German Von Frankenberg, who served as Djemal Pasha’s chief of staff, explained the reasons for the failure at the Battle of Romani with these words: "In my opinion, the reason this operation did not benefit Turkish-German interests was that it was carried out half-heartedly from beginning to end. It was not clearly known what was sought to be achieved. Thus, the means never matched the objective..." First Expeditionary Force Commander Kress von Kressenstein attempted to explain the inner workings of the defeat at the Battle of Romani by stating that it was a mistake to conduct the operation in July-August when it should have been done in the spring, that there were difficulties in obtaining provisions due to the locust disaster, and that the Canal Operation fell to the second tier due to the Sharif Hussein Rebellion. Von Kressenstein went even further in his claims.

Falih Rıfkı Atay, one of the figures close to Djemal Pasha, expressed the Romani defeat with the following sentence: "Step-by-step defeat in the face of superior forces."

Following the Battle of Romani, Djemal Pasha decided to retreat to Palestine by establishing weak outposts on the El-Arish-Nahil line. He wished to conduct an expedition to the Hejaz in the winter by creating a strong defensive line here, but was unable to implement this plan due to Enver Pasha's opposition. Meanwhile, the Lloyd George Government, which came to power on 7 December 1916, once again changed their existing strategies and ordered an attack to drive the Turks from Sinai. As a result of the first offensive operation known as the First Battle of Gaza, British units succeeded in entering El-Arish on 21 December. Upon this situation, no choice remained for Djemal Pasha but to order the evacuation of Arish and the desert. Approximately three weeks later, the British attacked Gaza again, but this time were unsuccessful and forced to retreat. Djemal Pasha stated that after Gallipoli, the British would not forget this defeat either, and that British pride and obstinacy were broken by this victory, which took place between 17/20 April 1917 during the Second Battle of Gaza. The Ottoman Government decided to decorate Djemal Pasha with the "Order of Osmanieh" for his outstanding success in both Battles of Gaza.

== See also ==
- Raid on the Suez Canal
