= Jagdstaffel 55 =

Jasta 55
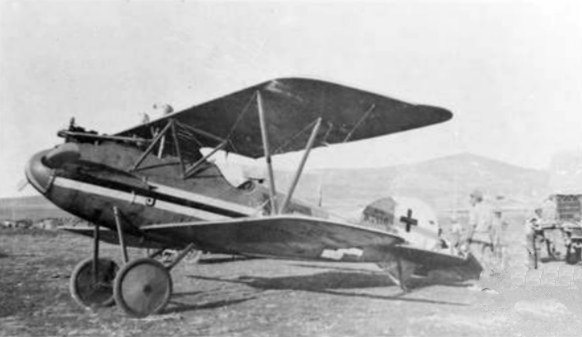
- An Albatros D.Va aircraft from the Jasta was captured by Australian forces at Jenin, North Palestine, in 1918.
- Active: 1918
- Country: German Empire
- Branch: Luftstreitkräfte
- Type: Fighter squadron
- Engagements: World War I

Royal Prussian Jagdstaffel 55, commonly abbreviated to Jasta 55, was a "hunting group" (i.e., fighter squadron) of the Luftstreitkräfte, the air arm of the Imperial German Army during World War I. The squadron scored at least eight aerial victories during the war. The unit's victories came at the expense of eight killed in action, one killed in a flying accident, and one taken prisoner of war.

== History ==
Jasta 55 was formed on 1 January 1918 at Flieger-Abteilung (Flier Detachment), Schneidemuhl, Kingdom of Prussia (present day Poland). On 25 January, it mobilized for shipment to Jenin, Palestine, which was then part of the Ottoman Empire; the new unit was in place by 31 March 1918. The squadron was locally dubbed Jasta 1F. It moved to Derra on 20 September 1918, and lasted out the war there.;

== Commanding officers (Staffelführer) ==
- Karl Meierdirks: ca 1 January 1918 – 4 May 1918 (KIA)
- Wilhelm Debus: ca 4 May 1918 – 1 June 1918
- Gerhard Wilhelm Flecken: 1 June 1918 – war's end

== Duty stations ==
- Jenin: 31 March 1918 – 20 September 1918
- Derra: 20 September 1918 – war's end

== Aircraft ==
- Albatros D.III
- Albatros D.V
