= 111th Infantry Division (German Empire) =

111th Infantry Division (111. Infanterie-Division)
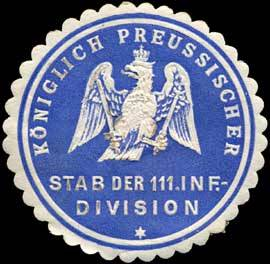
- Seal mark of the division
- Active: 25 March 1915 – 1919
- Country: German Empire
- Branch: Imperial German Army
- Type: Infantry
- Size: Approx. 12,500
- Engagements: World War I: Battle of Loos; Battle of the Somme; Battle of Arras (1917); Battle of Passchendaele; German spring offensive; Operation Michael

The 111th Infantry Division (111. Infanterie-Division) was a formation of the Prussian Army and part of the Imperial German Army in World War I. The division was formed on March 25, 1915, near Brussels, Belgium, and organized over the next several weeks. It was part of a wave of new infantry divisions formed in the spring of 1915. The division was disbanded in 1919 during the demobilization of the German Army after World War I.

The division was formed primarily from the excess infantry regiments of regular infantry divisions which were being triangularized. The division's 221st Infantry Brigade was formerly the 38th Infantry Brigade of the 19th Infantry Division, which came to the new division along with the 73rd Füsilier Regiment. The 76th Infantry Regiment came from the 17th Infantry Division. The 164th Infantry Regiment was formerly part of the 20th Infantry Division. The 73rd Füsiliers and the 164th Infantry were Hanoverian regiments, and the 76th was the regiment of the Hanseatic City of Hamburg. Cavalry support came in the form of two squadrons of Baden's 22nd Dragoons. The artillery and combat engineer units were newly formed.

== Combat chronicle ==
The 111th Infantry Division entered the line on the Western Front in the region between the Meuse and Moselle rivers in April 1915. It fought in several engagements, and was then transferred to the front in the Flanders and Artois region. The division fought in the battle by La Bassée and Arras in June 1915, and in the Battle of Loos in September and October 1915. It remained in positional warfare in the Flanders and Artois region into 1916, and fought in the Battle of the Somme. The division remained in the trenchlines in the Somme region into 1917. In April and May, it fought in the Battle of Arras. Later in the year, it fought in the Battle of Passchendaele, also known as the Third Battle of Ypres. In 1918, the division participated in the German spring offensive, fighting in the Second Battle of the Somme. It remained in the line, except for brief respites until the end of the war. Allied intelligence rated the division as second class.

== Order of battle on formation ==
The 111th Infantry Division was formed as a triangular division. The order of battle of the division on March 25, 1915, was as follows:

- 221. Infanterie-Brigade
  - Füsilier-Regiment Feldmarschall Prinz Albrecht von Preußen (Hannoversches) Nr. 73
  - Infanterie-Regiment Hamburg (2. Hanseatisches) Nr. 76
  - 4. Hannoversches Infanterie-Regiment Nr. 164
- 3. Eskadron/3. Badisches Dragoner-Regiment Prinz Karl Nr. 22
- 4. Eskadron/3. Badisches Dragoner-Regiment Prinz Karl Nr. 22
- Feldartillerie-Regiment Nr. 221
- Fußartillerie-Batterie Nr. 111
- Pionier-Kompanie Nr. 221

== Late-war order of battle ==
The division underwent relatively few organizational changes over the course of the war. Cavalry was reduced, artillery and signals commands were formed, and combat engineer support was expanded to a full pioneer battalion. The order of battle on May 1, 1918, was as follows:

- 221.Infanterie-Brigade
  - Füsilier-Regiment Feldmarschall Prinz Albrecht von Preußen (Hannoversches) Nr. 73
  - Infanterie-Regiment Hamburg (2. Hanseatisches) Nr. 76
  - 4. Hannoversches Infanterie-Regiment Nr. 164
- 4.Eskadron/3. Badisches Dragoner-Regiment Prinz Karl Nr. 22
- Artillerie-Kommandeur 111
  - Feldartillerie-Regiment Nr. 94
  - II.Bataillon/Fußartillerie-Regiment Nr. 25 (from May 4, 1918)
- Pionier-Bataillon Nr. 111
  - Pionier-Kompanie Nr. 221
  - Pionier-Kompanie Nr. 262
  - Minenwerfer-Kompanie Nr. 111
- Divisions-Nachrichten-Kommandeur 111
