= Asia Corps =

Imperial Germany Army formations during World War I

- Active: 28 January 1915 – 28 October 1918
- Country: German Empire
- Branch: German Army
- Nicknames: Pasha I, Pasha II
- Engagements: World War I: Sinai and Palestine Campaign

Commanders
- Notable commanders: Gustav von Oppen; Werner von Frankenberg und Proschlitz

The Asia Corps (German: Asien-Korps or Levantekorps) was a formation of the Imperial German Army which was sent to the Middle East to assist the military of the Ottoman Empire in the Middle Eastern theatre of World War I.

== Pasha I ==
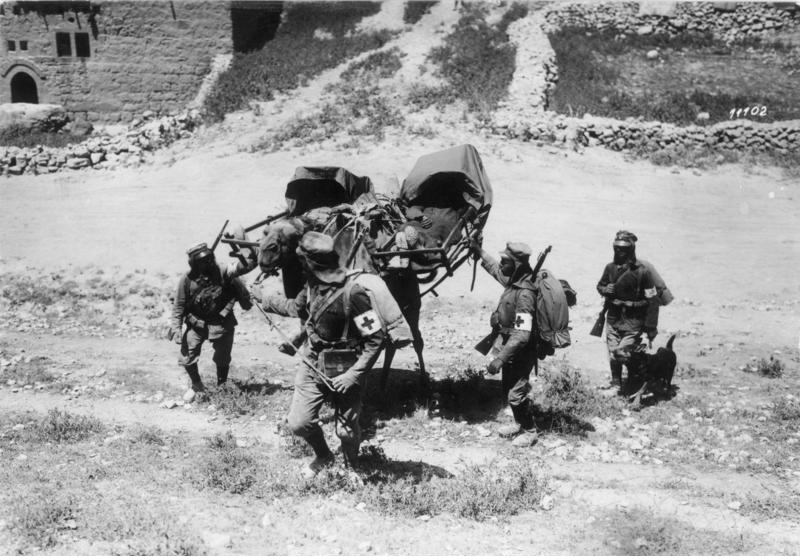
Medics from Asia Corps carrying a wounded soldier with camel (Palestine/May 1918).

The first German troops despatched to assist the Ottoman Army in 1914 and 1915 were Pioneers, who assisted in the construction of roads in Sinai. In December 1914, a Tropical Medical expedition was sent to work with Ottoman sanitary units in Palestine to combat epidemics of typhoid, typhus, dysentery and cholera.

Once Serbia had been conquered, it became possible to send large quantities of equipment and munitions to the Ottoman Armies via the Danube River and Balkan railways. A detachment of specialist troops and officers, the Asia Korps, was assembled to increase the Ottoman Army's effectiveness in the use of equipment they hitherto lacked. In March 1916, the "Pasha I Expedition" set out for Palestine. The various units of the expedition included:

- Infantry Battalion 701
- Infantry support gun sections 701, 702, 703
- Machine gun company 701
- Asia Korps Cavalry squadron
- Pioneer detachment 701
- Pioneer company 205 (from the Hessian 11th Pioneer Battalion)
- Flying detachment (Fliegerabteilung) 300 ("Pasha")
- Mountain Signal detachment 27
- Survey section 27
- Medical section

Fortress Railway Construction Company No. 11 and Railway Operating Companies Nos. 44 and 48 were also deployed to assist the Ottoman railway authorities on the lines of communication.

In April, the 300th Flying Detachment ("Pasha") was stationed in Beersheba with 14 Rumpler C.I aircraft. The other troops of the expedition joined them there in April. The Flying Detachment was subsequently stationed in El Arish and Bir El 'Abd. After Turkish defeats in the Second Suez Offensive and Battle of Romani, they subsequently fell back to Beersheba and Ramallah.

== Pasha II ==
On 11 March 1917, after the Fall of Baghdad to the British Army, the Ottoman Army assembled an Army Group codenamed Yildirim to recover Baghdad. The German Army increased the strength of the detachments with the Ottoman troops by despatching a second expedition, "Pasha II" under Major General Werner von Frankenberg zu Proschlitz, in August. Following Ottoman defeats in the Battle of Beersheba and Third Battle of Gaza in late October, the Yildirim Army Group was diverted to prevent further collapse in Palestine. After the capture of Jerusalem by the British in December, further reinforcements were despatched, including substantial fighting ground formations.

The German troops forming Pasha II, and subsequent reinforcements were under the administrative control of the 201st Infantry Brigade commanded by Major General Werner von Frankenberg zu Proschlitz, and included:

- Infantry Regiment No. 146 (Masurian)
- Infantry Battalions 702 and 703. (Together with Infantry Battalion 701 and the machine-gun and other detachments of Pasha I, this gave Pasha II the strength of another regiment)
- 11th Reserve Jäger battalion, subsequently withdrawn to Germany.
- Flying detachments 301, 302, 303, 304 (Bavarian), 305
- A fighter squadron – Jagdstaffel 55
- Mountain Signal detachment 28
- Pasha II Signal detachment (Nachrichtenabteilung)

German staff officers with signal and other personnel formed a Corps headquarters within the Ottoman Eighth Army in Palestine, which was also termed the "Asia Corps", although it is also referred to in Turkish histories as the "Left Wing Group", commanded by Colonel Gustav von Oppen.

== Austro-Hungarian troops in the Middle East ==
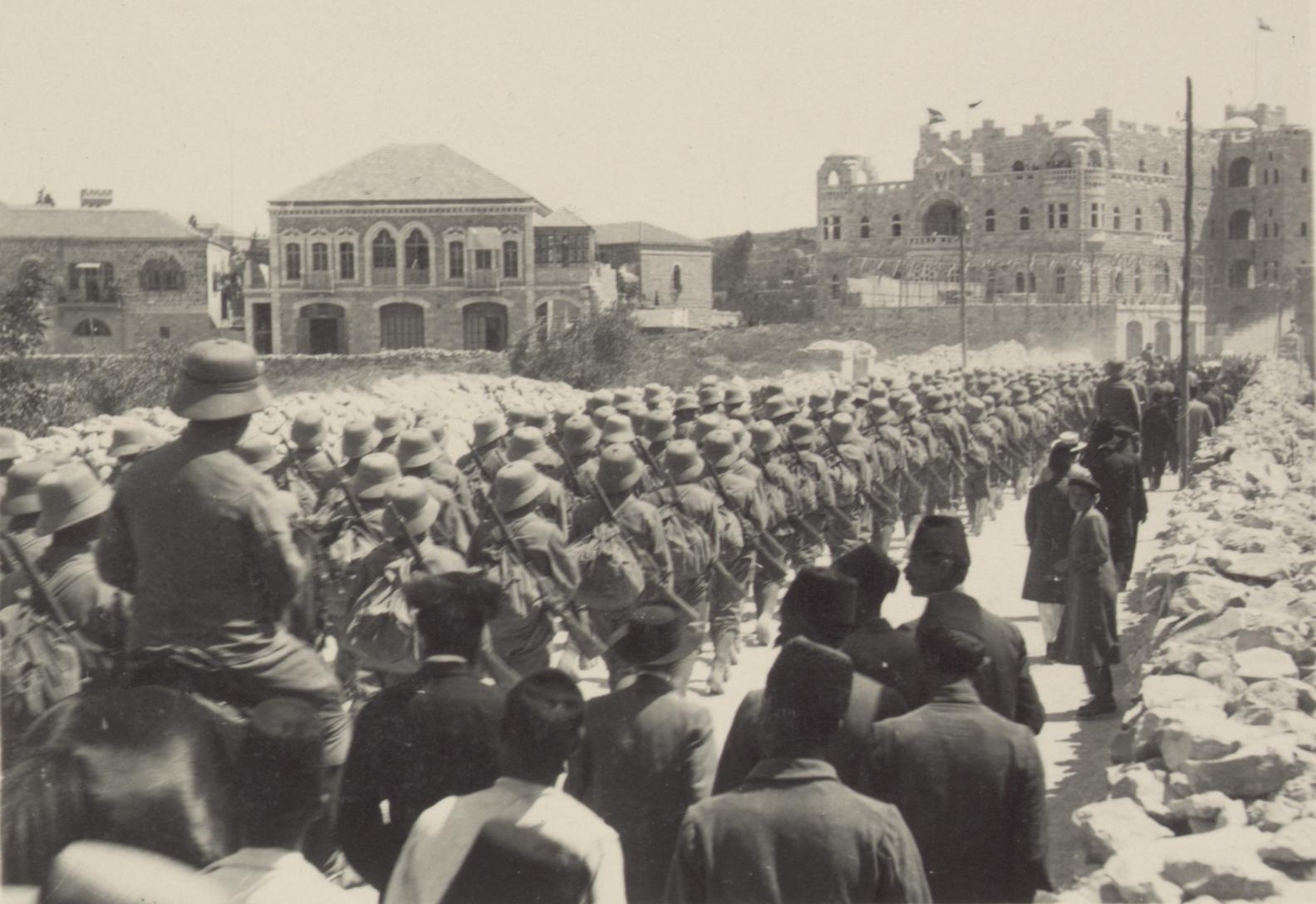
Austro-Hungarian troops marching to their quarters at St. Paulus, Jerusalem.

Austria-Hungary also sent detachments of specialists and supporting arms to Ottoman Empire. The first units were sent to Gallipoli:

- Motor Mortar Battery No. 9
- Howitzer Battery No. 36

Between the summer of 1916 and the end of the war, the following artillery units were serving on the Palestine front:

- Mountain Howitzer Battery No. 1/4
- Mountain Howitzer Battery No. 2/6

Austro-Hungarian artillery commanders (Major Adolf Wilhelm Marno von Eichenhorst and Hauptmann Władysław Anton Ritter von Truszkowski [1876–1917]) entering Jerusalem, April 1916.

Major Adolf Wilhelm Marno von Eichenhorst commanded this artillery group until 1917, after which it was commanded by Captain Wladislaw Ritter von Truszkowski. The overall commander of Austro-Hungarian troops in the Ottoman Empire was Feldmarschall-Leutnant Joseph Ritter von Pomiankowski. It was planned in 1917 and 1918 to send an "Orient-Korps" to the Ottomans, but this was abandoned.

== Final actions ==
In the Battle of Megiddo, the Ottoman forces west of the Jordan River were engulfed by the Allied offensive. The surviving German and Austrian detachments fought their way northward towards Damascus amid the routed Turkish armies.

== Sources ==
- Bruce, Anthony. The Last Crusade: The Palestine Campaign in the First World War. MacArthur & co. ISBN 978-0-7195-6505-2.
- Erickson, Edward J. (2001). Ordered to die: a history of the Ottoman army in the First World War. Greenwood Publishing Group. ISBN 0-313-31516-7.
