= Yildirim Army Group =

Ottoman military unit during World War I

Yıldırım Army Group
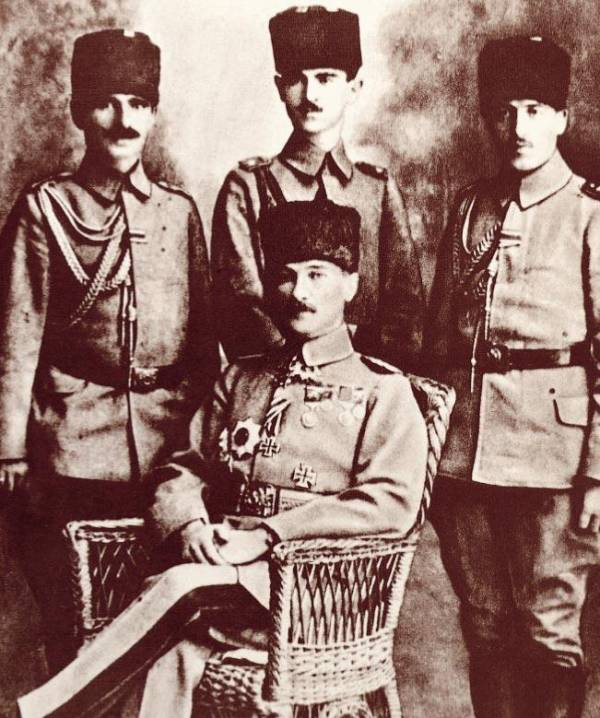
- Mustafa Kemal Atatürk as the last commander of the Yıldırım Army Group, with his adjutants, 1918.
- Active: July 1917 – November 7, 1918
- Country: Ottoman Empire
- Type: Army group
- Size: 150,000
- Patron: Sultans of the Ottoman Empire
- Engagements: Sinai and Palestine Campaign (World War I); Battle of Megiddo

Commanders
- Notable commanders: Erich von Falkenhayn (July 1917 – February 6, 1918); Otto Liman von Sanders (February 24 – October 30, 1918); Mustafa Kemal Atatürk (October 31 – November 7, 1918)

The Yıldırım Army Group or Thunderbolt Army Group of the Ottoman Empire or Army Group F (German: Heeresgruppe F) was an Army Group of the Ottoman Army during World War I. While being an Ottoman unit, it also contained the German Asia Corps. It was modeled after stormtrooper doctrine.

Starting in June 1917, the Yildirim Army Group's first commander in chief was the former Prussian Minister of War and Chief of Staff Erich von Falkenhayn. Von Falkenhayn was replaced by General of the Cavalry Otto Liman von Sanders on 25 February 1918. After the Armistice of Mudros on 30 October 1918, Mustafa Kemal took command until the Group's dissolution a few days later.

== Establishment ==
Upon the death of Goltz Pasha just prior to Ottoman victory at Siege of Kut in the Mesopotamia front in Iraq, German military mission representative in Constantinople General Otto von Lossow on April 22, 1916 had asked Berlin by telegraph to have (then) chief of German general staff General Erich von Falkenhayn be appointed to the head of 6. Ottoman Army to protect the high interests of Germany in Iran and Mesopotamia. He had also suggested that Liman von Sanders, who was responsible for the Dardanelle front, could now be moved to Levant also. Ottoman Minister of War, Enver Pasha was initially against the involvement of German allies in Baghdad. After the success of Halil Pasha at Siege of Kut, he did not want him to feel slighted. The Ottoman army meanwhile had failed to capitalize on the success at Kut and the British had made extensive preparations for another general assault. The British then attacked strongly, and Halil Pasha could not hold on to the defensive positions and Ottomans had to evacuate Baghdad on March 10/11, 1917.

Immediately plans were started to take this ancient and important city back. Only once it was realized that retaking of Baghdad would not be possible without German help, Enver Pasha relented and the new organization was allowed to proceed

Organization of the Yildirim Army group started on May 7, 1917, with the arrival General Falkenhayn to Constantinople. His official commission was approved on July 11, 1917 by Sultan, and order for the establishment of the army group was published on July 15.

Liman von Sanders makes a vague reference to the Napoleon's French campaign in Egypt and Syria for the choice of the name. Naming was also chosen to obfuscate the intended mission and theater of operation for this army group. Germans called it F(Falke) Army Group. This army group was composed of Ottoman 6. and 7. Armies, with German Asia Corps attached to 7. Army.

The order for the creation of the army group specifically read as follows:

- An army group named Yildirim to be established. For the time being headquarters will be in Constantinople
- Yildirim Army Group will be commanded by Field Marshal (Mushir, his rank was raised) Falkenhayn and his chief of staff is Colonel Dommes
- 6. and 7. Armies will be assigned to the new group
- 13. and 18. Corps will join 6th Army, and 3. and 15. Corps will join the 7., which will be assigned German Asia Corps also. Pasha II headquarters will have a German infantry battalion with three companies, three German machine gun companies, and all technical support personnel needed.
- 6. and 7. Armies will immediately complete their preparations and assemble under the new army group.

Its organization was to be very different that other German units and personnel assisting the Ottoman war effort. Its staff was organized like that of a German army group, with a German general on top. Yıldırım Army received separate German funds to help with equipment and needs of the personnel. The army group included troops who used the latest Western-Front infiltration tactics; were equipped with close-combat gear, such as Stahlhelms and stick-grenades; and were supported by artillery and machine guns.

== Mission ==
Original mission of Yildirim Army Group was to move South along Euphrates and surround the British. There was a plan for a small naval force on the river also. Meanwhile British had conquered Akabe and had launched an intense propaganda campaign among Arab populations behind the fronts. Falkenhayn immediately realized the danger and told Enver Pasha that it would not be wise to move to Baghdad without securing the Sinai front first. 4. Army commander Cemal Pasha, concerned about intense British propaganda, also favored bolstering the Sinai-Palestine area. There were intense discussions among the military leaders, Enver Pasha, Mushir Falkenhayn, Cemal Pasha, von Kres Pasha, Liman von Sanders and Berlin as the mission goals were changed. Eventually in September, Falkenhayn succeeded in directing the Yildirim Army Group towards Sinai and Palestine.

Cemal Pasha was favoring a defensive operation, von Kress thought a limited offensive operation would be most appropriate, and Falkenhayn was for a broad attack. Ottoman Army Headquarters tried to solve this difference of opinion on the strategy by assigning 8. Army to von Kress and made responsible for the Sinai front. Cemal Pasha was given the responsibility for Syria and Western Arabia as the commander of the 4. Army, and Jerusalem and Palestine region would be the responsibility of Falkenhayn, who was given full command of 6., 7. and 8. Armies. Army group was also assigned four aviation companies.

== World War I ==
=== Order of Battle, August 1917 ===
In August 1917, the army group was structured as follows:

- Yildirim Army Group (Müşir Erich von Falkenhayn); Chief of Staff Col von Dommes, Asst. CoS Lt Col Hüseyin Hüsnü, Camp de Aid Maj Erkilet
  - Seventh Army, Syria (Mirliva Mustafa Kemal Atatürk), CoS Maj Omer Lütfü (12-18 July 1918), CoO Maj Rüstü
  - III Corps Col. Ismet Inonu, CoS Maj Sefik Avni, CoO Maj Naci
    - 24th Division Lt Col Willmer, from Gallipoli
    - 50th Division Lt Col S. Naili, sent to Mesopotamia
  - XV Corps BG Ali Riza Paşa
    - 19th Division Lt Col Sedet
    - 20th Division Lt Col Yasin Hilmi, from Galicia
    - German Asia Corps Col Frankenberg
  - Sixth Army, Mesopotamia BG Halil Kut
    - XIII Corps
      - 2nd Division
      - 6th Division
    - XVIII Corps
      - 14th Division
      - 51st Division
      - 52nd Division
    - 46th Division

with the

- 42nd Division
- 48th Division
- 59th Division
  - XX Corps at Huj
    - 16th Division
    - 54th Division
    - 178th Infantry Regiment
    - 3rd Cavalry Division
  - XXII Corps Col Refet, Gaza
    - 3rd Division
    - 7th Division
    - 53rd Division

=== Order of Battle, January 1918 ===
In January 1918, the army group was structured as follows:

- Yildirim Army Group (Müşir Erich von Falkenhayn)
  - Seventh Army (Mirliva Fevzi Çakmak)
    - III Corps
      - 1st Division, 19th Division, 24th Division
    - XV Corps
      - 26th Division, 53rd Division
    - 3rd Cavalry Division
    - German Asia Corps
  - Eighth Army (Ferik Cevat Çobanlı)
    - XXII Corps
      - 3rd Division, 7th Division, 20th Division
    - 16th Division, 54th Division, 2nd Caucasian Cavalry Division

=== Order of Battle, June 1918 ===
In June 1918, the army group was structured as follows:

- Yildirim Army Group (Müşir Otto Liman von Sanders)
  - Seventh Army (Mirliva Fevzi Çakmak)
    - III Corps
      - 1st Division, 24th Division, 3rd Cavalry Division
    - XV Corps
      - 26th Division, 53rd Division, 19th Division
    - German Asia Corps
  - Eighth Army (Ferik Cevat Çobanlı)
    - XXII Corps
      - 3rd Division, 7th Division, 20th Division
    - 16th Division
    - 54th Division
    - 2nd Caucasian Cavalry Division

=== Order of Battle, September 1918 ===
In September 1918, the army group was structured as follows:

- Yildirim Army Group (Müşir Otto Liman von Sanders)
  - Fourth Army (Mirliva Cemal Mersinli)
    - II Corps (Miralay Galatalı Şevket Bey)
      - 62nd Division, Provisional Division x 3
    - Jordan Group
      - 24th Division, 3rd Cavalry Division
    - VIII Corps (Miralay Yasin Hilmi Bey)
      - 48th Division, Umman Provisional Division
  - Seventh Army (Mirliva Mustafa Kemal Atatürk)
    - III Corps (Miralay İsmet İnönü)
      - 1st Division, 11th Division
    - XV Corps (Miralay Ali Fuat Cebesoy)
      - 26th Division, 53rd Division
  - Eighth Army (Ferik Cevat Çobanlı)
    - XXII Corps (Miralay Refet Bele)
      - 7th Division, 20th Division
    - Left Wing Corps (Oberst Gustav von Oppen)
      - 16th Division, 19th Division
      - German Asia Corps
    - 2nd Caucasian Cavalry Division

== After Mudros ==
=== Order of Battle, November 1918 ===
In November 1918, the army group was structured as follows:

- Yildirim Army Group (Mirliva Mustafa Kemal Atatürk)
  - Second Army (Mirliva Nihat Anılmış)
    - XII Corps
      - 23rd Division
    - XV Corps
      - 41st Division, 44th Division
  - Seventh Army (Mirliva Ali Fuat Cebesoy, deputy)
    - III Corps
      - 11th Division, 24th Division
    - XX Corps
      - 1st Division, 43rd Division

=== Yildirim Troops Inspectorate, May 1919 ===
In April 1919, Şevket Turgut Pasha, Cevat Çobanlı and Fevzi Çakmak hold a secret meeting in Constantinople. They prepared a report called "Trio Oath" (Üçler Misâkı) and decided to establish army inspectorate for the defense of homeland. In late April, Fevzi Çakmak submitted this report to the Minister of War Şakir Pasha. On April 30, 1919, the War Ministry and Sultan Mehmed VI ratified the decision about the establishing of army inspectorates that had been accepted by the Chief of General Staff And then the First Army Troops Inspectorate (stationed in Constantinople, Fevzi Çakmak), the Yildirim Troops Inspectorate (stationed in Konya, Cemal Mersinli, later Second Army Inspectorate) Inspectorate, the Ninth Army Troops Inspectorate (stationed in Erzurum, Mustafa Kemal Atatürk, later Third Army Inspectorate) was formed. Additionally, the Rumeli Military Troops Inspectorate (Nureddin Pasha) would be established and the XIII Corps would be under the direction of the Ministry of War. In May 1919, the army inspectorate was structured as follows:

- Yildirim Troops Inspectorate (Yıldırım Kıt'aatı Müfettişliği, Konya, Inspector: Ferik Cemal Mersinli)
  - XII Corps (Niğde, Miralay Selâhaddin Bey)
    - 11th Division
    - 41st Division
    - 7th Cavalry Regiment
    - 20th Cavalry Regiment
  - XX Corps (Ankara, Mirliva Ali Fuat Cebesoy)
    - 23rd Division
    - 24th Division
  - XVII Corps (Smyrna, Mirliva Ali Nadir Pasha, transferred from the First Army Troops Inspectorate after the Occupation of Smyrna)
    - 56th Division
    - 57th Division
