= Caucasus Army Group (Ottoman Empire) =

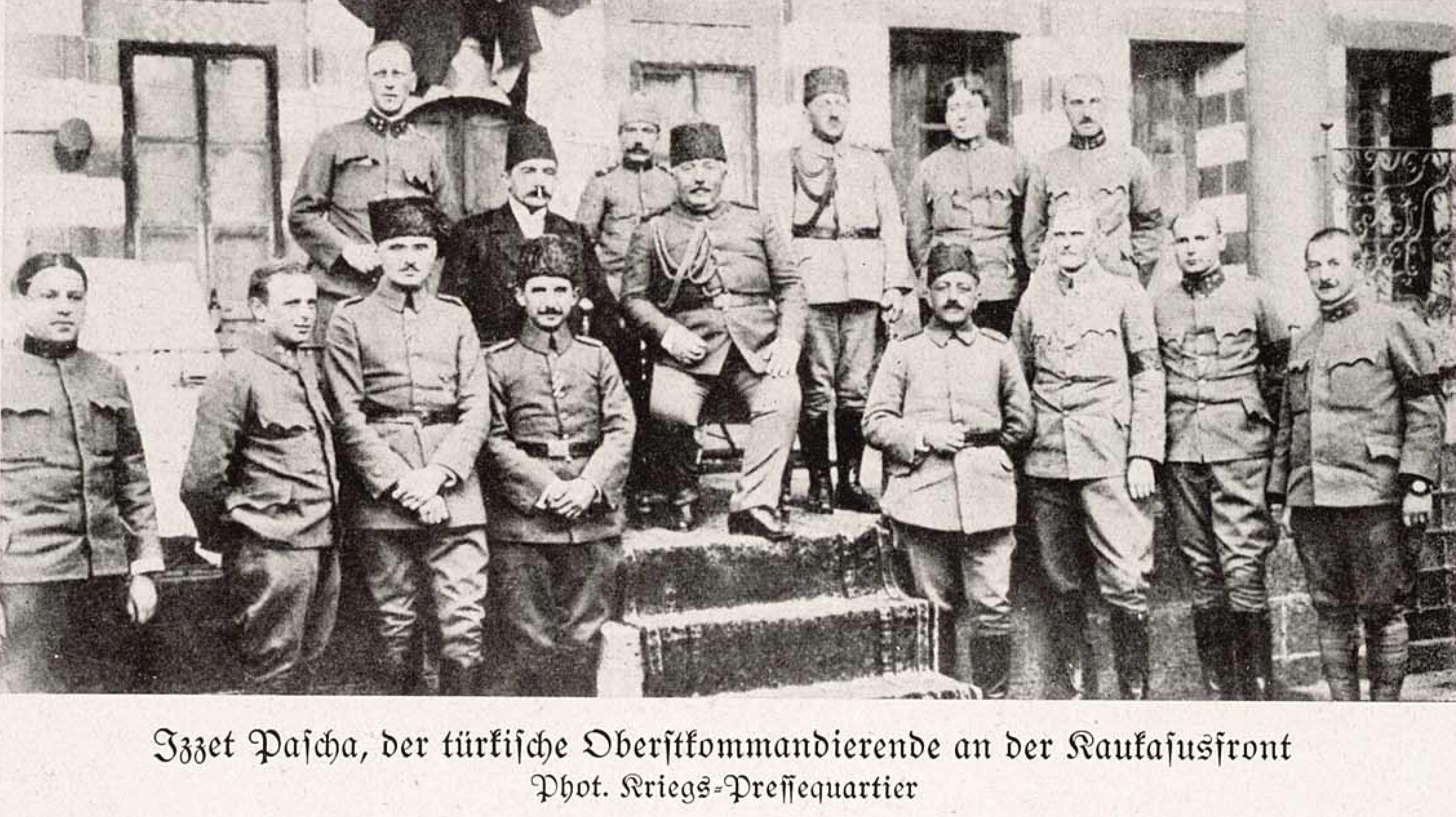
- Ahmet Izzet Pasha and his men
- Active: March 8, 1917 - December 16, 1917
- Country: Ottoman Empire
- Type: Army group
- Patron: Sultans of the Ottoman Empire
- Engagements: Caucasus Campaign (World War I)

Commanders
- Notable commanders: Ahmet Izzet Pasha (March 8, 1917 - December 16, 1917)

The Caucasus Army Group or Caucasian Army Group of the Ottoman Empire (Turkish: Kafkas Ordular Grubu) was one of the army groups of the Ottoman Army. It was formed during World War I.

== Formation ==
=== Order of Battle, August 1917 ===
In August 1917, the army group was structured as follows:

- Caucasus Army Group (Birinci Ferik Ahmet Izzet Pasha)
- Second Army, (Mirliva Mustafa Fevzi Pasha)
  - II Corps (Miralay Cafer Tayyar Bey)
    - 1st Division, 42nd Division
  - IV Corps
    - 11th Division, 12th Division, 48th Division
  - XVI Corps
    - 5th Division, 8th Division
  - 2nd Regular Cavalry Division
  - Van Gendarmerie Division
- Third Army, (Ferik Mehmet Esat Pasha)
  - I Caucasian Corps (Miralay Kâzım Karabekir Bey)
    - 9th Caucasian Division, 10th Caucasian Division, 36th Caucasian Division
  - II Caucasian Corps (Mirliva Yakup Şevki Pasha)
    - 5th Caucasian Division, 11th Caucasian Division, 37th Caucasian Division
  - V Corps
    - Coastal Detachments
