= First Army (Ottoman Empire) =

Field army of the Ottoman Army

- Active: September 6, 1843; August 5, 1914 – February 17, 1918; September 24, 1918 – October 11, 1918
- Country: Ottoman Empire
- Type: Field Army
- Garrison/HQ: Selimiye, Constantinople
- Nickname: Hassa Ordusu

The First Army or First Guards Army of the Ottoman Empire (Turkish: Birinci Ordu or Hassa Ordusu) was one of the field armies of the Ottoman Army. It was formed in the middle 19th century during Ottoman military reforms.

The First Army (Turkey) of the 21st-century Turkish Land Forces traces its history directly to the Ottoman First Army, and has the date "1843" in its badge.

== Unit Lists ==
=== Order of Battle, 1877 ===
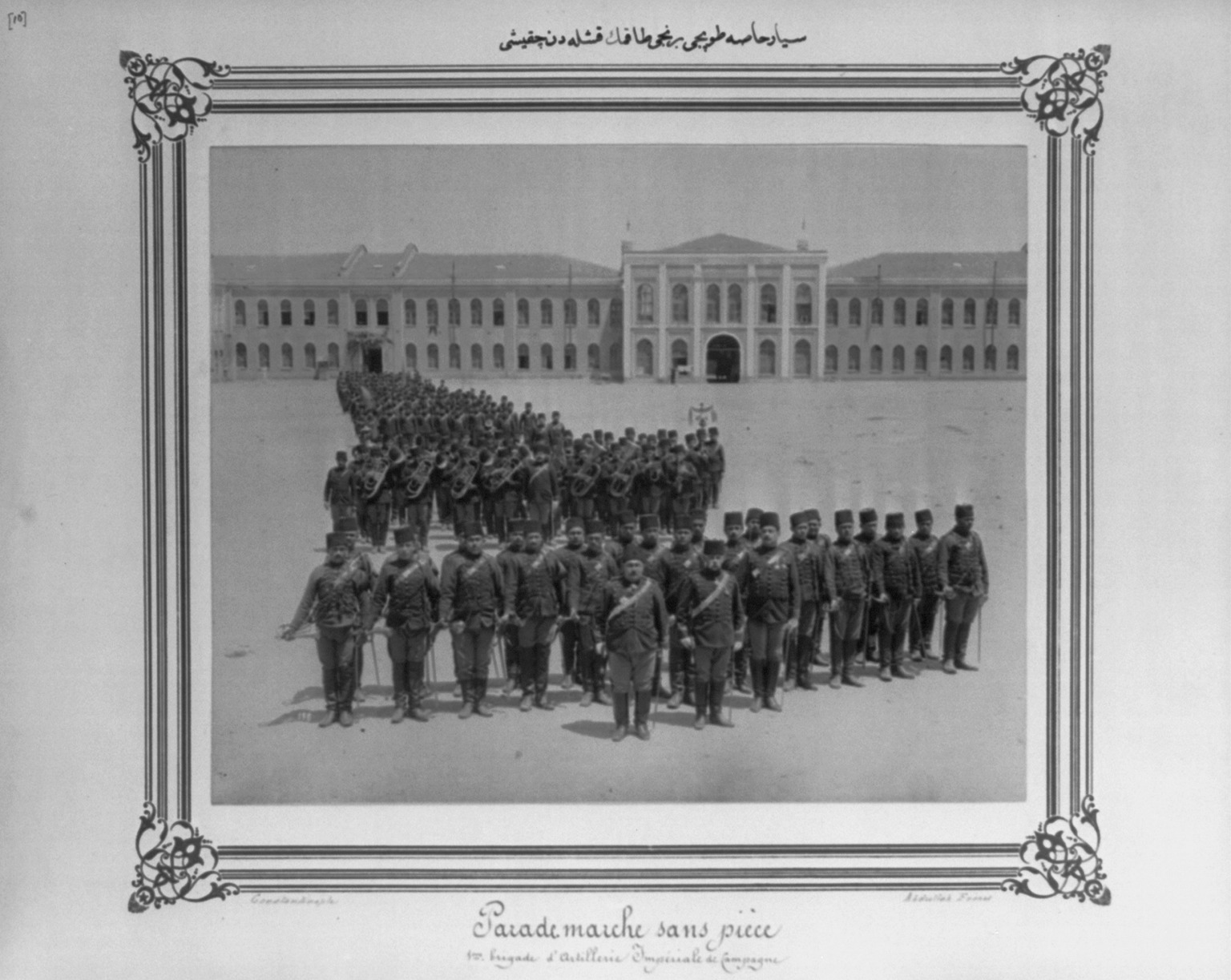

In 1877, it was stationed in Selimiye. It was composed of:

- Infantry: Seven line regiments and seven rifle battalion.
  - 1st Regular Infantry Division (Birinci Nizamiye Fırkası)
  - 2nd Regular Infantry Division (İkinci Nizamiye Fırkası)
- Cavalry: Five line regiments and one Cossack brigade.
  - Cavalry Division (Süvari Fırkası)
- Artillery: Nine field and three horse batteries, one İhtiyat regiment.
  - Artillery Division (Topçu Fırkası)
- Engineer: One sapper company, eight companies of engineers, one company of artificers.
  - Engineer regiment (İstihkâm Alayı) x 2

=== Order of Battle, 1908 ===
After the Young Turk Revolution and the establishment of the Second Constitutional Era on July 3, 1908, the new government initiated a major military reform. Army headquarters were modernized. Its operational area was Constantinople and the Bosporus, and it had units in Europe and Asia Minor. It commanded the following active divisions: The First Army also had inspectorate functions for four Redif (reserve) divisions:

- First Army Headquarters:
  - 1st Infantry Division (Birinci Fırka)
  - 2nd Infantry Division (İkinci Fırka)
  - 1st Cavalry Division (Birinci Süvari Fırkası)
  - 1st Artillery Division (Birinci Topçu Fırkası)
  - Chataldja Fortified Area Command (Çatalca Müstahkem Mevkii Komutanlığı)
- Redif divisions of the First Army (name of the division denotes its location)
  - 1st Bursa Reserve Infantry Division (Birinci Bursa Redif Fırkası)
  - 2nd Kastamonu Reserve Infantry Division (İkinci Kastamonu Redif Fırkası)
  - 3rd Ankara Reserve Infantry Division (Üçüncü Ankara Redif Fırkası)
  - 4th Kayseri Reserve Infantry Division (Dördüncü Kayseri Redif Fırkası)

=== Order of Battle, 1911 ===
With further reorganizations of the Ottoman Army, to include the creation of corps level headquarters, by 1911 the Army was headquartered in Harbiye. The Army before the First Balkan War in 1911 was structured as such:

- Army Headquarters, Harbiye, Constantinople
- I Corps, Harbiye, Constantinople (Ferik Zeki Pasha)
  - 1st Infantry Division, Harbiye, Constantinople (Colonel Hasan İzzet Bey)
  - 2nd Infantry Division, Selimiye, Constantinople (Mirliva Prens Aziz Pasha)
  - 3rd Infantry Division, Pangaltı, Constantinople (Mirliva Osman Pasha)
  - War Academy, Harbiye, Constantinople
  - Bosporus Fortified Area Command, Bosporus, Constantinople
- II Corps, Tekfur Dağı (Mirliva Şevket Turgut Pasha)
  - 4th Infantry Division, Tekfur Dağı
  - 5th Infantry Division, Gallipoli
  - 6th Infantry Division, Izmir
  - Dardanelles Fortified Area Command, Çanakkale
- III Corps, Kırk Kilise
  - 7th Infantry Division, Kırk Kilise
  - 8th Infantry Division, Çorlu
  - 9th Infantry Division, Babaeski
- IV Corps, Adrianople (Ferik Ahmet Abuk Pasha)
  - 10th Infantry Division, Adrianople
  - 11th Infantry Division, Dedeağaç
  - 12th Infantry Division, Gümülcine
  - Adrianople Fortified Area Command, Adrianople

== World War I ==
=== Commanders ===
- Otto Liman von Sanders (November 1914–March 1915)
- Colmar von der Goltz (March–October 1915)
- Esat Pasha (October 1915–24 February 1918)

=== Order of Battle, August 1914 ===
In August 1914, the army was structured as follows:

- I Corps
  - 1st Division, 2nd Division, 3rd Division
- II Corps
  - 4th Division, 5th Division, 6th Division
- III Corps
  - 7th Division, 8th Division, 9th Division
- 1st Cavalry Brigade

=== Order of Battle, November 1914 ===
In November 1914, the army was structured as follows:

- I Corps
  - 1st Division, 2nd Division, 3rd Division
- II Corps
  - 4th Division, 5th Division, 6th Division
- III Corps
  - 7th Division, 8th Division, 9th Division
- IV Corps
  - 10th Division, 11th Division, 12th Division
- 19th Division
- 20th Division
- 1st Cavalry Brigade

=== Order of Battle, Late April 1915 ===
In late April 1915, the army was structured as follows:

- I Corps
  - 1st Division, 2nd Division
- II Corps
  - 4th Division, 5th Division, 6th Division
- IV Corps
  - 10th Division, 12th Division
- 20th Division
- 1st Cavalry Brigade

=== Order of Battle, Late Summer 1915, January 1916 ===
In late Summer 1915, January 1916, the army was structured as follows:

- 1st Division
- 20th Division
- 1st Cavalry Brigade

=== Order of Battle, August 1916 ===
In August 1916, the army was structured as follows:

- 1st Cavalry Brigade
- 49th Division

=== Order of Battle, December 1916 ===
In December 1916, the army was structured as follows:

- I Corps
  - 14th Division, 16th Division
- 1st Cavalry Brigade

=== Order of Battle, August 1917 ===
In August 1917, the army was structured as follows:

- I Corps
  - 42nd Division
- 1st Cavalry Brigade

=== Order of Battle, January 1918 ===
In January 1918, the army was structured as follows:

- I Corps
  - 42nd Division
- 1st Cavalry Brigade
- 15th Division
- 25th Division

=== Order of Battle, June 1918 ===
In June 1918, the army was structured as follows:

- I Corps
  - 42nd Division
- 1st Cavalry Brigade
- 25th Division

=== Order of Battle, September 1918 ===
In September 1918, the army was structured as follows:

- I Corps
  - 42nd Division
- 1st Cavalry Brigade

== After Mudros ==
=== First Army Troops Inspectorate, May 1919 ===
In April 1919, Şevket Turgut Pasha, Cevat Pasha and Kavaklı Mustafa Fevzi Pasha hold a secret meeting in Constantinople. They prepared a report called "Trio Oath" (Üçler Misâkı) and decided to establish army inspectorate for the defense of homeland. In late April, Kavaklı Mustafa Fevzi Pasha submitted this report to the Minister of War Şakir Pasha. On April 30, 1919, the War Ministry and Sultan Mehmed VI ratified the decision about the establishing of army inspectorates that had been accepted by the Chief of General Staff And then the First Army Troops Inspectorate (stationed in Constantinople, Kavaklı Mustafa Fevzi Pasha), the Yildirim Troops Inspectorate (stationed in Konya, Mersinli Cemal Pasha, later Second Army Inspectorate) Inspectorate, the Ninth Army Troops Inspectorate (stationed in Erzurum, Mustafa Kemal Pasha, later Third Army Inspectorate) was formed. Additionally, the Rumeli Military Troops Inspectorate (Nureddin Pasha) would be established and the XIII Corps would be under the direction of the Ministry of War. In May 1919, the army inspectorate was structured as follows:

- First Army Troops Inspectorate (Birinci Ordu Kıt'aatı Müfettişliği, Constantinople, Inspector: Ferik Kavaklı Mustafa Fevzi Pasha)
  - I Corps (Adrianople, Miralay Cafer Tayyar Bey)
    - 49th Division
    - 60th Division
  - XIV Corps (Tekfurdağı, Mirliva Yusuf Izzet Pasha)
    - 55th Division
    - 61st Division
  - XVII Corps (Smyrna, Mirliva Ali Nadir Pasha, transferred to the Yildirim Army Troops Inspectorate after the Occupation of Smyrna)
    - 56th Division
    - 57th Division
  - XXV Corps (Constantinople, Mirliva Ali Sait Pasha)
    - 1st Division
    - 10th Caucasian Division

== Commanders ==
- Müşir (Field Marshal) Hasan Rıza Pasha (September 6, 1843 – February 3, 1847)
- Müşir Mehmet Rüşdi Pasha (February 3, 1847-March 1849)
- Müşir Mahmut Pasha (March 1849-Aug 7, 1852)
- Müşir Mehmet Selim Pasha (August 8, 1852 – May 15, 1853, May 1855-November 1857)
- Müşir Mehmet Reşit Pasha (September 1854-May 1855)
- Müşir Mehmet Vasıf Pasha (November 1856-September 4, 1857, -1860)
- Müşir Namık Pasha (July 1860-September 1861)
- Müşir Mehmet Fuat Pasha (September 1861-June 1863)
- Müşir Hüseyin Avni Pasha (June 1863-20 Aralık 1865)
- Müşir Abdülkerim Nadir Pasha (December 20, 1865 – June 3, 1868)
- Müşir Ömer Lütfi Pasha (June 4, 1868 – December 3, 1869)
- Müşir Mehmet İzzet Pasha (December 4, 1869 – August 27, 1870, January 1873-February 1873)
- Müşir Ahmet Esat Pasha (August 27, 1870 – September 1, 1871)
- Şehzade Yusuf İzzettin Efendi (September 1, 1871-January 1873)
- Müşir Mehmet Redif Pasha (February 1873-June 1876)
- Müşir Derviş İbrahim Pasha (June 1876-June 1877)
- Ferik Hüseyin Hüsnü Pasha (June 1877-March 1878)
- Müşir Osman Nuri Pasha (March 1878-July 12, 1880)
- Müşir İsmail Hakkı Pasha (July 12, 1880 – 1881)
- Müşir Mehmed Rauf Pasha bin Abdi Pasha (1881–1908)
- Ferik Ömer Yaver Pasha (August 24, 1909 – June 3, 1910)
- Ferik Zeki Pasha (June 4, 1910 – March 1, 1911)
- Mirliva Mahmut Şevket Pasha (March 2, 1911 – August 30, 1912)
- Müşir Abdullah Pasha (August 31, 1912 – 1913)
- Müşir Otto Liman von Sanders (August 3, 1914 – April 2, 1915)
- Müşir Colmar Freiherr von der Goltz (April 2, 1915 – October 5, 1915)
- Mirliva Mehmet Esat Pasha (October 12, 1915 – February 17, 1918)
