= Ali Fuat Cebesoy =

6th Speaker of the Parliament of the Republic of Turkey (1948)

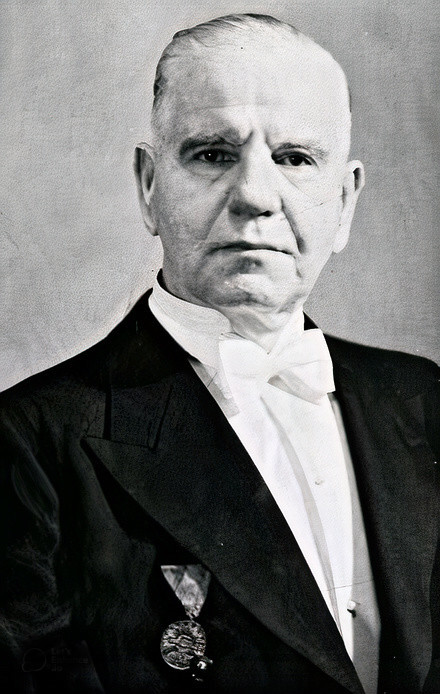

6th Speaker of the Grand National Assembly
- In office 30 January 1948 – 1 November 1948
- President: İsmet İnönü
- Prime Minister: Hasan Saka; Şemsettin Günaltay
- Preceded by: Kâzım Karabekir
- Succeeded by: Şükrü Saracoğlu

4th Minister of Transport
- In office 9 March 1943 – 7 August 1946
- President: İsmet İnönü
- Prime Minister: Abdülhalik Renda
- Preceded by: Fahri Engin
- Succeeded by: Şükrü Koçak

11th Minister of Public Works
- In office 3 April 1939 – 9 March 1943
- President: İsmet İnönü
- Prime Minister: Abdülhalik Renda; Şükrü Saracoğlu
- Preceded by: Ali Çetinkaya
- Succeeded by: Sırrı Day

Member of the Grand National Assembly
- In office 23 April 1920 – 1 September 1927
- Constituency: Ankara (1920, 1923)
- In office 25 April 1931 – 27 May 1960
- Constituency: Konya (1927, 1931, 1935, 1939, 1943); Istanbul (1950, 1954, 1957)

Personal details
- Born: 23 September 1882 Istanbul, Ottoman Empire
- Died: 10 January 1968 (aged 85) Istanbul, Turkey
- Resting place: Turkish State Cemetery
- Party: Democratic
- Education: Turkish Military Academy
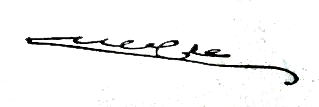
- Signature
- Nickname: Salacaklı Ali Fuat

Military service
- Allegiance: Ottoman Empire (1902–1919); Turkey (1919–1925)
- Branch/service: Ottoman Army; Turkish Army
- Rank: General
- Commands: 25th Division, 14th Division, 5th Division, 20th Corps, Kuva-yi Milliye of Western Anatolia, 2nd Army
- Battles/wars: Italo-Turkish War; Balkan Wars; World War I Greco-Turkish War

Ali Fuat Cebesoy (23 September 1882 – 10 January 1968) was a Turkish military officer who served in the Ottoman Army and then in the Turkish army and politician.

== Early life ==
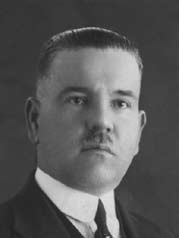
Ali Fuat Cebesoy in his early days

Ali Fuat was born on 23 September 1882 to father Ismail Fazil Pasha and mother Zekiye Hanım. He was of German-Circassian descent, and also his maternal grandfather Mehmed Ali Pasha was of Huguenot-French descent. Ali Fuat was the grandson (on his mother's side) of Mushir Mehmet Ali Pasha (Ludwig Karl Friedrich Detroit) who was the commander of the Danube Army (Tuna Şark Ordusu) during the Russo-Turkish war, participated in the Congress of Berlin as one of three representatives of the Ottoman Empire and was killed on 7 September 1878 in Gjakovë (Kosovo) by Albanian insurgents who were dissatisfied with the results of the Berlin Congress.

== Military career ==
Ali Fuat attended the Ottoman Military College together with Kemal Atatürk, Kazım Karabekir, and Fethi Okyar amongst other notables of the Turkish War of Independence. Following he entered the War School in 1902, and graduated from the Ottoman War College in 1905 as a Staff Captain (Erkân-ı Harp Yüzbaşısı). Later he was assigned to the 3rd Rifle Battalion (Üçüncü Nişancı Taburu), the 28th Cavalry Regiment (Yirmi Sekizinci Süvari Alayı) based in Beirut under the command of Fifth Army based in Damascus, and later to 15th Artillery Regiment (On Beşinci Topçu Alayı) based in Thessalonica under the command of Third Army as an intern. He joined the Committee of Union and Progress (membership number was 191). On 28 June he was assigned to the staff officer of the Third Army. And then he was promoted to the rank of Senior Captain and appointed to the area commander of Karaferye (present day: Veria). On 9 January 1909 he was appointed to the military attaché in Rome, Italy. On 1 October 1911 he was appointed to the chief of the 1st department (chief of operations) of the Western Army. On 20 February he was temporarily appointed to the chief of staff of the I Corps, VII Corps. And then he was appointed to the commander of a detachment that was formed to liberate İpek (present day: Peć) and Yakova (present day: Đakovica) from Albanian insurgents.

=== Balkan Wars ===
On 24 June he was dispatched to Europe for the preparation of the transfer of arms and ammunition to Tripoli Vilayet. On 29 September he was appointed to the chief of staff of the İşkodra Corps. He also participated in the Balkan Wars. He became the chief of staff of the Yanya Corps, and on 11 November he was appointed to the deputy commander of the 23rd Division (Yirmi Üçüncü Fırka), replacing Mirliva Djevad Pasha. On 12 December, when the Greek offensive commanded by Konstantinos Sapountzakis was launched, he planned to retreat in an orderly fashion, but panic amongst the ranks led to the defeat of his division. In the defense line of Bizani he was severely wounded in the thigh, but continued to direct artillery fire whilst on a stretcher. On 6 March 1913 he and his forces surrendered following the instruction of Esad Pasha (Battle of Bizani). He was then transferred to a hospital in Kifissia, a suburb of Athens, to receive medical treatment.

=== World War ===
On 15 January 1914 he was appointed to the chief of staff of the VIII Corps. After Kress von Kressenstein was appointed the chief of staff of this corps, replacing Ali Fuat, he was promoted to the rank of Lieutenant Colonel (Kaymakam), and on 19 September he was appointed to the commander of the 25th Division. In January 1915, he participated in the First Suez Offensive. On 7 January he and his division left Birüssebi (present day: Beersheba) for the desert and arrived at the front of the Suez Canal, but the Ottoman forces couldn't pass the canal and retreated. He and his division went back to Gaza on 20 January 1915.

After the Gallipoli Campaign was launched, the 25th Division was dispatched to the Gallipoli Front on 24 May 1915, and started to arrive there on 2 June 1916. His division entered to the order of the XVII Corps of the First Army and deployed in the Bulair-Saros area.

On 20 January 1916 he was appointed to the commander of the 14th Division. At first, his division was intended for use in the Second Suez Offensive and sent to Maallaha, but because of the Russian offensive, his division instead came under the command of the Second Army under Ahmed Izzet Pasha, and on 27 June were sent back from the Rayak station to Aleppo and dispatched to Diyârbekir.

On 30 September he was promoted to commander of the 5th Division and in January he became the chief of staff of the Seconde Army.

On 12 January 1917 he returned to the Sina-Palestine Front and in April he became the deputy commander of the Sina-Palestine Front. On 30 June 1917 he became the commander of the XX Corps. He then fought in the Battle of Jerusalem in which the Ottomans lost the city of Jerusalem to the British. After the Armistice of Mudros was signed, he concurrently became the deputy commander of Seventh Army, replacing Mustafa Kemal. After the Seventh Army was abolished, he transferred the headquarters of the XX Corps from Syria to Ereğli, then to Konya and to Ankara.

== War of Independence ==
Ali Fuat Pasha organized the resistance in Western Turkey against the Greek invasion and thus actually started the National Independence War. He contributed to the resistance forces against the Greek army that had begun to occupy Western Anatolia. He signed Amasya Protocol and at the end of the Sivas Congress in 1920, he was appointed as the general commander of the National Forces by the Board of Representatives. The presence of him and his army in Ankara is the reason behind Atatürk's choice of this city as the center of Turkish War of Independence.

The same year, he was elected as a deputy at the First Parliament. He was appointed ambassador to Moscow, Soviet Russia in 1921, as he had quarrels with İsmet İnönü, who was appointed by Atatürk as the Commander of the Western Front although İnönü had failed against Greek invasion at Kutahya-Altıntas in 1921. By personally negotiating with Vladimir Lenin and Joseph Stalin in Moscow, he signed the Treaty of Moscow (1921), along the lines of the Brest-Litovsk Peace Treaty, as the representative of the Ankara government, which provided financial and military support from Russia to the Turkish Independence War, in exchange for ceding the right to Batum, then controlled by the Georgian Republic, to the Soviet government. After finishing his duty as an ambassador, he was elected as the second spokesman of the Grand National Assembly of Turkey.

== Political life ==
After the declaration of the Turkish Republic, he became a deputy. In this new era of his political career, he joined the founders of the opposition party, the Progressive Republican Party, and he was elected as the general secretary of the party in 1924. During the rebellion of Shaikh Said, the Law on the Maintenance of Order was affected and the Progressive Republican Party was closed down. Ali Fuat Cebesoy was arrested with the accusations of participating in the attempt of assassination against Atatürk and was taken to İzmir. He was tried at the İzmir Independence Court and was acquitted in 1926.

He retired with the title of general. He stayed away from politics for four years between 1927 and 1931. In 1931, he returned to politics and was elected as a deputy representing Konya. He served as the deputy for Konya and Eskişehir until 1950. He also served as Minister of Public Works from 1939 to 1943, Minister of Transportation (1943–1946) and as the president of the Parliament in 1948. He was an independent candidate of the Democratic Party from Eskişehir in the first democratic elections of the Turkish history held on 14 May 1950, and he was elected with a landslide. In the following years, he was elected as a deputy from İstanbul and served in the parliament for ten more years between 1950 and 1960. After the military coup on 27 May 1960, he was initially arrested by the junta with the rest of the Democratic Party MPs but later set free. After this experience he quit politics for good.

In accordance with his will, he was buried in the backyard of a mosque near Geyve train station, where the first shots of the Turkish War of Independence were fired, when he died at the age of 86. However, his remains were moved to the Turkish State Cemetery in Ankara, after the military coup of 1980.

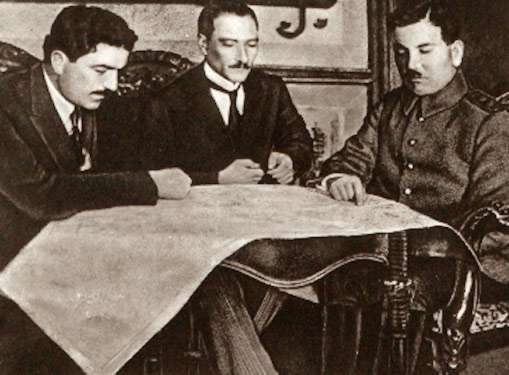
Mustafa Kemal is holding a meeting with Ali Fuat Cebesoy and Rauf Orbay during the Sivas Congress (September 1919)

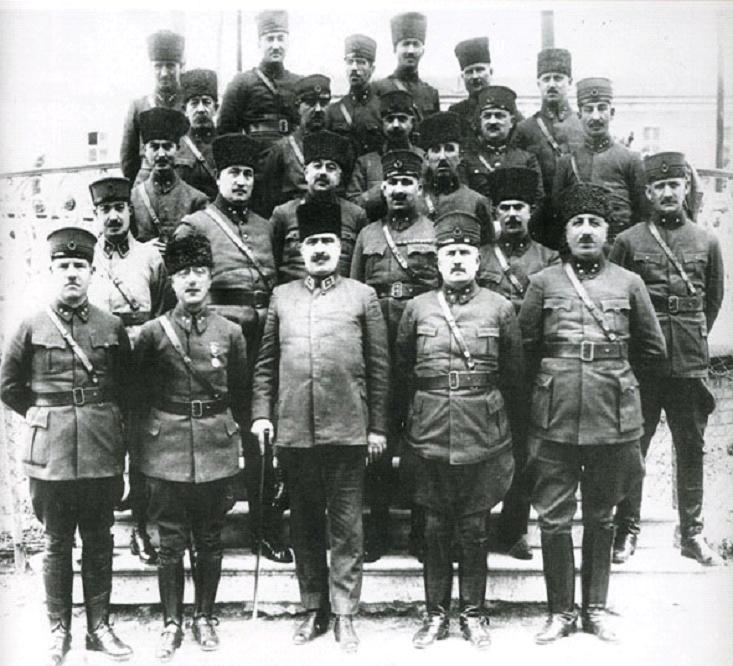
Commanders of Turkish Army during the Turkish War of Independence

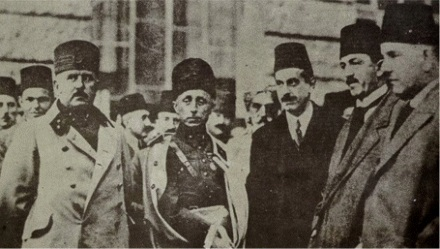
Founders of the Progressive Republican Party, 1924, in front of the Haydarpaşa Terminal

== See also ==
- List of high-ranking commanders of the Turkish War of Independence

Political offices
Preceded by Kâzım Karabekir	Speaker of the Parliament of Turkey; 30 January 1948 – 1 November 1948	Succeeded by Şükrü Saracoğlu
Military offices
Preceded by Ismet Bey (İnönü)	Commander of the XX Corps; 30 June 1917 – 26 June 1920	Succeeded by –
Preceded by –	Commander of the Western Front; 26 June 1920 – 10 November 1920	Succeeded by Ismet Bey (İnönü)
Preceded by –	Commander of the Second Army; 21 November 1923 – 31 October 1924	Succeeded by Fahreddin Pasha (Altay)
