= Eighth Army (Ottoman Empire) =

- Active: 1917 – November 13, 1918
- Country: Ottoman Empire
- Type: Field Army
- Patron: Sultans of the Ottoman Empire
- Engagements: Sinai and Palestine Campaign (World War I); Battle of Megiddo

Commanders
- Notable commanders: Friedrich Kress von Kressenstein (October 2 – December 2, 1917); Cevat Pasha (December 2, 1917 – November 3, 1918)

The Eighth Army of the Ottoman Empire (Turkish: Sekizinci Ordu) was one of the field armies of the Ottoman Army. It was established during World War I.

== World War I ==
In June 1917, Enver Paşa activated the Yildirim Army Group (also known as Thunderbolt Army Group) commanded by the German General Erich von Falkenhayn, and reinforced it with surplus Ottoman units transferred from Galicia, Romania, and Thrace.

Following the formation of the Yildirim Army Group substantial forces were deployed to Syria and Palestine, where they continued to hold the Fourth Army defenses. Already in Palestine were the 3rd, 7th, 16th, and 54th Infantry Divisions while the 26th 27th, and 53rd Infantry Divisions arrived during the summer. The 3rd, 7th 16th, and 26th Infantry Divisions had fought in the Gallipoli campaign and the 3rd Cavalry Division had fought in the Caucasian Campaigns.

On 2 October 1917, he activated the new Eighth Army, commanded by Kress von Kressenstein, and deployed it along with the Seventh Army, commanded by Mustafa Kemal to the Yildirim Army Group. Seven infantry division and one cavalry division already serving in the region, formed the recently activated Ottoman Eighth Army. They were the 3rd, 7th, 16th, 26th, 27th, 53rd and 54th Infantry Divisions and the 3rd Cavalry Division.

=== Order of Battle, January 1918 ===
In January 1918, the army was structured as follows:

- Eighth Army, (Ferik Cevat Pasha)
  - XXII Corps
    - 3rd Division, 7th Division, 20th Division
  - 16th Division
  - 54th Division
  - 2nd Caucasian Cavalry Division

=== Order of Battle, September 1918 ===
In September 1918, the army was structured as follows:

- Eighth Army, (Ferik Cevat Pasha)
  - XXII Corps
    - 7th Division, 20th Division
  - Left Wing Group (Colonel Gustav von Oppen)
    - 16th Division, 19th Division
    - German Asia Corps
  - 2nd Caucasian Cavalry Division

== After Mudros ==
=== Order of Battle, November 1918 ===
In November 1918, the army was structured as follows:

- Eighth Army, (Smyrna)
  - XVII Corps
    - 58th Division
  - XXI Corps
    - 57th Division
