= Seventh Army (Ottoman Empire) =

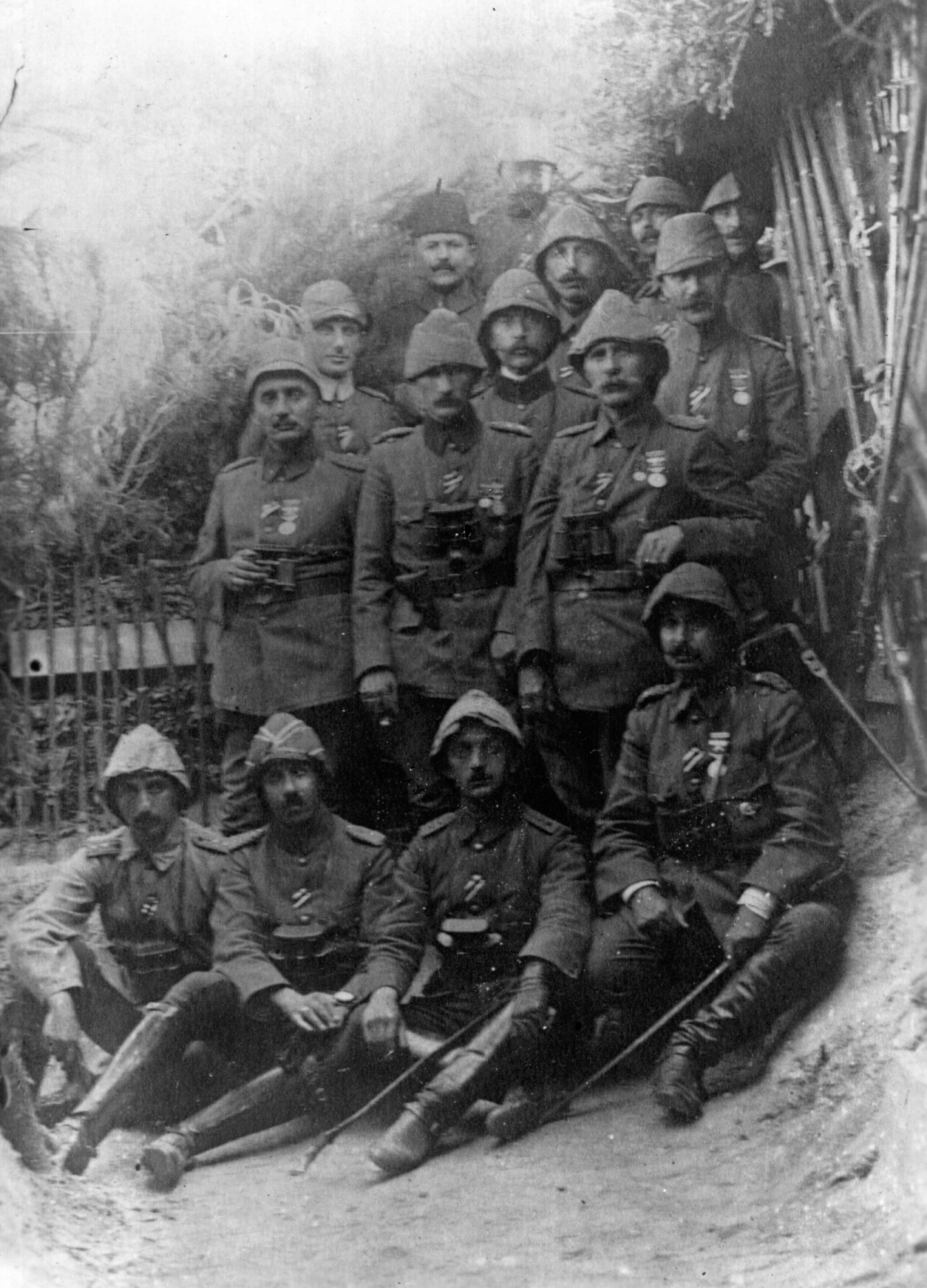
- Commander and men of III Corps, 1915
- Active: 1877–? August 12, 1917 – November 7, 1918
- Country: Ottoman Empire
- Size: Effectively corps (although named as an army)
- Part of: Yildirim Army Group
- Engagements: Sinai and Palestine Campaign (World War I); Battle of Megiddo

Commanders
- Notable commanders: Mustafa Kemal (July 5 – October 9, 1917); Fevzi Çakmak Paşa (October 9, 1917 – August 1918); Mustafa Kemal (August 7 – November 7, 1918)

The Ottoman Seventh Army was a large military formation of the Ottoman Empire in the late 19th and early 20th centuries. Although designated as an army, at least by 1918, it was only of corps strength.

The Seventh Army was established in 1877 for service in Arabia and the Yemen. By 1908 it consisted of the 13th and 14th infantry divisions, one cavalry regiment and one artillery regiment and they were involved in combatting insurgent tribesmen in the Yemen.

== World War I ==
=== Order of Battle, August 1917 ===
In August 1917, the army was structured as follows:

- Seventh Army, Syria (Mirliva Mustafa Kemal Pasha)
  - III Corps
    - 24th Division, 50th Division
  - XV Corps
    - 19th Division, 20th Division
  - German Asia Corps

In late 1917, commanded by Fevzi Pasha, the Seventh Army was ordered to advanced across the desert in order to bring pressure to bear upon Allenby's inland flank in Palestine. While Allenby attacked the Ottoman Eighth Army, his Australian Mounted Division was sent to hold back the advance of the Seventh Army. The Seventh Army did manage to force the Australians to retreat by several miles but ultimately the Australians held their line. After the British victory in the Battle of Mughar Ridge on 13 November (which did not directly involve the Seventh Army), Fevzi decided to withdraw the Seventh Army to guard Jerusalem.

=== Order of Battle, January 1918 ===
In January 1918, the army was structured as follows:

- Seventh Army (Mirliva Mustafa Fevzi Pasha)
  - III Corps
    - 1st Division, 19th Division, 24th Division
  - XV Corps
    - 26th Division, 53rd Division
  - 3rd Cavalry Division
  - German Asia Corps

=== Order of Battle, June 1918 ===
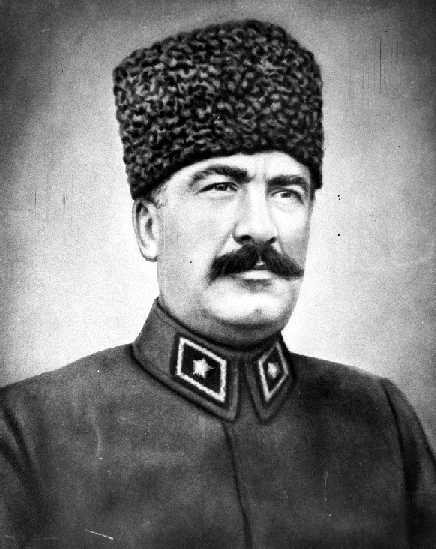
Mustafa Fevzi Pasha, commander of the Seventh Army in June 1918

In June 1918, the army was structured as follows:

- Seventh Army (Mirliva Mustafa Fevzi Pasha)
  - III Corps
    - 1st Division, 24th Division, 3rd Cavalry Division
  - XV Corps
    - 26th Division, 53rd Division, 19th Division
  - German Asia Corps

=== Order of Battle, September 1918 ===
In September 1918, the army was structured as follows:

- Seventh Army (Mirliva Mustafa Kemal Pasha)
  - III Corps (Miralay Ismet Pasha)
    - 1st Division, 11th Division
  - XV Corps (Miralay Ali Fuat Bey)
    - 26th Division, 53rd Division

The Seventh Army was destroyed by British aerial bombardment during its retreat from Nablus on 21 September 1918.

== After Mudros ==
=== Order of Battle, November 1918 ===
In November 1918, the army was structured as follows:

- Seventh Army (Mirliva Ali Fuat Pasha, deputy)
  - III Corps
    - 11th Division, 24th Division
  - XX Corps
    - 1st Division, 43rd Division
