= Mehmed Rauf Pasha bin Abdi Pasha =

Ottoman soldier and statesman

Mehmed Rauf Pasha bin Abdi Pasha (Ottoman Turkish: محمد رئوف پاشا بن عبدی پاشا), (born 1832, Istanbul – died 1908, Istanbul) was an Ottoman soldier and statesman of Circassian origin.

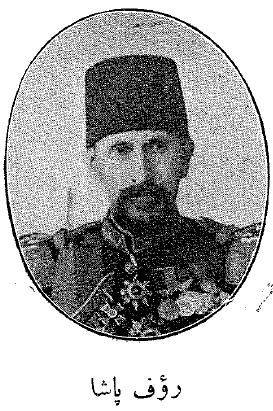
Rauf Pasha

As a child, he took lessons from private tutors. In his youth he was assigned to the Sublime Porte and soon became an officer. In 1849, at the rank of lieutenant, he accompanied Mushir Omar Pasha during the Bosnian Rebellion and the Crimean War.

After the Treaty of Paris in 1856, he was sent to France as a military attaché and stayed in Paris for six years and completed his education at the French Staff School. After returning to Istanbul, in 1868, he was promoted to the rank of Mirliva and traveled in Europe with Sultan Abdülaziz as his aide-de-camp. He was promoted to the rank of Ferik for his achievements in Crete. In 1870 he was promoted to the rank of Mushir and appointed Vali (Governor) of Crete. He then served as the governor of the Vilayets of Ioannina, Shkoder, Kastamonu, Baghdad and Yemen, again Governor of Crete and Yemen, then Governor of Thessaloniki and Bosnia. In 1875 he was appointed Minister of the Navy.

After the ascension of Abdul Hamid II to the throne, he became the Minister of the Navy for the second time and then Serasker and Artillery Commander. After the Russo-Turkish War (1877–1878), he was taken back to Edirne in the capacity of governor and Mushir of the Second Army.

In 1881, he was appointed as the Mushir of the First Army in Istanbul. After 27 years in this position, he retired in 1908 and died in his mansion in Çamlıca the same year. He was buried in Karacaahmet Cemetery.

In 2012, a street was named after him by the Municipality of Chania for his services to Crete.
