= Ninth Army (Ottoman Empire) =

- Active: June 7, 1918 – April 3, 1919
- Country: Ottoman Empire
- Type: Field Army
- Garrison/HQ: Kars, Erzurum
- Patron: Sultans of the Ottoman Empire
- Engagements: Caucasus Campaign (World War I)

Commanders
- Notable commanders: Yakup Şevki Pasha (June 8, 1918 – April 3, 1919)

The Ninth Army of the Ottoman Empire (Turkish: Dokuzuncu Ordu) was one of the field armies of the Ottoman Army. It was formed during World War I.

== World War I ==
=== Order of Battle, June 1918 ===
In June 1918, the army was structured as follows:

- Ninth Army, (Mirliva Yakup Şevki Pasha)
  - I Caucasian Corps (Mirliva Kâzım Karabekir Pasha)
    - 9th Caucasian Division, 10th Caucasian Division, 15th Division
  - IV Corps (Mirliva Ali İhsan Pasha)
    - 5th Division, 11th Division, 12th Division
  - Independent Cavalry Brigade

=== Order of Battle, September 1918 ===
In September 1918, the army was structured as follows:

- Ninth Army, (Mirliva Yakup Şevki Pasha)
  - 9th Caucasian Division, 11th Caucasian Division, 12th Division, Independent Cavalry Brigade

== After Mudros ==
=== Order of Battle, November 1918 ===
In November 1918, the army was structured as follows:

- Ninth Army, (Mirliva Yakup Şevki Pasha)
  - 3rd Caucasian Division (Ahıska)
  - 9th Caucasian Division (south of Erzincan)
  - 10th Caucasian Division (Batum - moving to Constantinople)
  - 11th Caucasian Division (Khoy)
  - 36th Caucasian Division (from Third Army, Gümrü)
  - 12th Division (Serdarabad)
  - Independent Cavalry Brigade

=== Ninth Army Troops Inspectorate, May 1919 ===
In April 1919, Şevket Turgut Pasha, Cevat Pasha, Mehmet Tülüde Pasha and Kavaklı Mustafa Fevzi Pasha held a secret meeting in Constantinople. They prepared a report called "Trio Oath" (Üçler Misâkı) and decided to establish army inspectorate for the defense of homeland. In late April, Kavaklı Mustafa Fevzi Pasha submitted this report to the Minister of War Şakir Pasha. On April 30, 1919, the War Ministry and Sultan Mehmed VI ratified the decision about the establishing of army inspectorates that had been accepted by the Chief of General Staff And then the First Army Troops Inspectorate (stationed in Constantinople, Kavaklı Mustafa Fevzi Pasha), the Yildirim Troops Inspectorate (stationed in Konya, Mersinli Cemal Pasha, Mehmet Tülüce Pasha and later Second Army Inspectorate) Inspectorate, the Ninth Army Troops Inspectorate (stationed in Erzurum, Mustafa Kemal Pasha, later Third Army Inspectorate) was formed. Additionally, the Rumeli Military Troops Inspectorate (Nureddin Pasha) would be established and the XIII Corps would be under the direction of the Ministry of War. In May 1919, the army inspectorate was structured as follows:

- Ninth Army Troops Inspectorate (Dokuzuncu Ordu Kıt'aatı Müfettişliği, Erzurum, Inspector: Mirliva Mustafa Kemal Pasha, renamed as Third Army Inspectorate on 15 June 1919)
  - III Corps (Sivas, Miralay Refet Bey)
    - 5th Caucasian Division
    - 15th Division
  - XV Corps (Erzurum, Mirliva Kâzım Karabekir Pasha)
    - 3rd Caucasian Division
    - 9th Caucasian Division
    - 11th Caucasian Division
    - 12th Division
