= Fevzi Çakmak =

Turkish field marshal and politician (1876–1950)

Mareşal Fevzi Çakmak
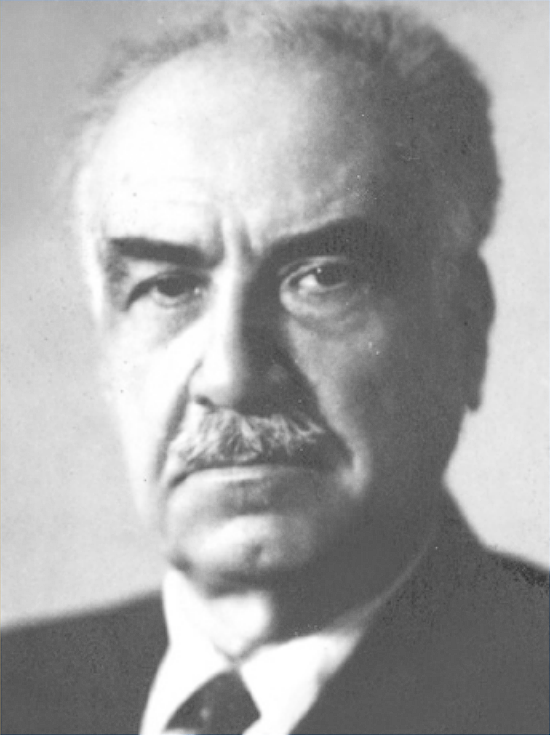
- Çakmak in 1946

2nd Prime Minister of the Government of the Grand National Assembly
- In office 24 January 1921 – 12 July 1922
- Preceded by: Mustafa Kemal Atatürk
- Succeeded by: Rauf Orbay

1st Deputy Prime Minister of Turkey
- In office 3 May 1920 – 24 January 1921
- Prime Minister: Mustafa Kemal Atatürk
- Preceded by: Position established
- Succeeded by: Mümtaz Ökmen (1946)

2nd Chief of General Staff
- In office 5 August 1921 – 12 January 1944
- President: Mustafa Kemal Atatürk; İsmet İnönü
- Preceded by: İsmet İnönü
- Succeeded by: Kâzım Orbay

1st Minister of National Defense
- In office 3 May 1920 – 5 August 1921
- Prime Minister: Mustafa Kemal Atatürk; Himself
- Preceded by: Position established
- Succeeded by: Refet Bele

Minister of War of the Ottoman Empire
- In office 3 February 1920 – 2 April 1920
- Prime Minister: Ali Rıza Pasha; Salih Hulusi Pasha

5th Chief of General Staff of the Ottoman Empire
- In office 24 December 1918 – 14 May 1919
- Prime Minister: Ahmet Tevfik Pasha; Damat Ferid Pasha
- Preceded by: Djevad Pasha
- Succeeded by: Djevad Pasha

Personal details
- Born: 12 January 1876 Cihangir, Istanbul, Ottoman Empire
- Died: 10 April 1950 (aged 74) Teşvikiye, Istanbul, Turkey
- Resting place: Eyüp Cemetery
- Party: Nation Party (Turkish Republic, 1948–50); Democrat Party (Turkish Republic, 1946–48); Committee of Union and Progress (Ottoman Empire)
- Education: Kuleli Military High School
- Alma mater: Ottoman Military College; Imperial Military Academy
- Nickname(s): Kavaklı Fevzi, Müşir, Mareşal

Military service
- Allegiance: Ottoman Empire (1896–1920); Ankara Government (1920–1923); Turkey (1920–1944)
- Branch/service: Ottoman Army; Army of the GNA; Turkish Army
- Years of service: 1896–1944
- Rank: Mareşal
- Commands: 2nd Division, 5th Corps, 2nd Caucasian Corps, 2nd Army, 7th Army, 1st Army Troops Inspectorate, Chief of the General Staff
- Battles/wars: Albanian Uprising; Italo-Turkish War; Balkan Wars; First World War; Turkish War of Independence; Sheikh Said rebellion Ararat rebellion Dersim Rebellion

Mustafa Fevzi Çakmak (12 January 1876 – 10 April 1950) was a Turkish field marshal (Mareşal) and politician. He served as the Chief of General Staff from 1918 and 1919 and later the Minister of War of the Ottoman Empire in 1920. He later joined the provisional Government of the Grand National Assembly and became the Deputy Prime Minister, Minister of National Defense and later as the prime minister of Turkey from 1921 to 1922. He was the second chief of the General Staff of the provisional Ankara Government and the first chief of the General Staff of the Republic of Turkey.

Graduating from the War College as a Staff captain and assigned to the 4th Department of the General Staff, Mustafa Fevzi participated in numerous battles during the prolonged downfall of the Ottoman Empire, such as the First Balkan War and the Battle of Monastir. He was engaged as the commander of the V Corps throughout the defence of Gallipoli, during which his younger brother was killed in the Battle of Chunuk Bair. He became a Pasha and the chief of General Staff of the Ottoman Empire after the First World War and was appointed as the commander of the First Army Troops Inspectorate in 1919 by Grand Vizier Ahmet Tevfik Pasha. After briefly serving as war minister in 1920, Fevzi left to join the dissident Grand National Assembly in Ankara as a Member of Parliament for Kozan.

He was appointed as national defence minister and deputy prime minister by Mustafa Kemal Paşa in 1920, commanding numerous military successes throughout the Turkish War of Independence, notably during the Battle of Sakarya. He succeeded Mustafa Kemal as prime minister in 1921, resigning in 1922 to engage in the successful Battle of Dumlupınar. He was appointed Field Marshal (Mareşal) in 1922 at the recommendation of Mustafa Kemal. He had succeeded İsmet İnönü as the Chief of General Staff in August 1921 and continued serving after the Turkish Republic was declared in 1923. Adopting the surname 'Çakmak', he was a candidate to succeed Mustafa Kemal Atatürk as the president of Turkey after Atatürk's death in 1938, but stood down in favour of İnönü. He continued to serve as chief of General Staff until 1944, after which he became a member of parliament for Istanbul from the Democrat Party. He later resigned from the Democrats and co-founded the Nation Party headed by Osman Bölükbaşı.

Fevzi Çakmak remains, alongside Mustafa Kemal Atatürk, as one of the only two field marshals of Turkey.

== Biography ==
=== Family and schools ===
Mustafa Fevzi was born on 12 January 1876 in Cihangir (Istanbul, Ottoman Empire). His family is of Turkish origin. Their ancestors came to Istanbul from Çakmak, in modern-day Balıkesir Province. to mother Hesna Hanım, daughter of Varnalı Hacı Bekir Efendi, who was the youngest son of Ömer Ağa, and father Ali Sırrı Efendi, who was the son of Çakmakoğlu Hüseyin Derviş Kaptan. Ali Sırrı Efendi had served for Tophane (Arsenal) as secretary. In 1879 Ali Sırrı Bey was appointed to Black Sea Artillery Regiment (Karadeniz Topçu Alayı) at Rumeli Kavağı, and the family moved there. Thus, Fevzi's name in the Army became 'Fevzi Pasha of Kavak' (Kavaklı Fevzi Paşa).

He studied at Sadık Hoca Mektebi in Rumeli Kavağı between 1882 and 1884. He continued to study at Tedrisiye-i Haybiye Mektebi in Sarıyer between 1884 and 1886, at Salonica Military School (Selânik Askerî Rüşdiyesi) between 1886 and 1887, at Soğukçeşme Askerî Rüşdiyesi between 1887 and 1890. He learned Arabic and Persian languages from his grandfather Hacı Bekir Efendi, who had studied in Egypt and Baghdad and was one of the prominent intelligentsia at the time. He continued to Kuleli Military High School (Kuleli Askerî İdadisi) between 1890 and 1893. After graduating from the Kuleli military high school, he entered Ottoman Military College on 29 April 1893. He completed the military school as the seventh of the class on 28 January 1896 and joined the Ottoman military as an infantryman where he saw combat during the Greco-Turkish War of 1897. Second Lieutenant (Mülâzım-ı Sani).

On 28 January 1898, he entered the Imperial War Academy and on 16 March 1897, he was promoted to the rank of first lieutenant. On 25 December 1898, he graduated from Academy as a staff captain and was assigned to the 4th department of the General Staff.

=== Western Rumelia ===
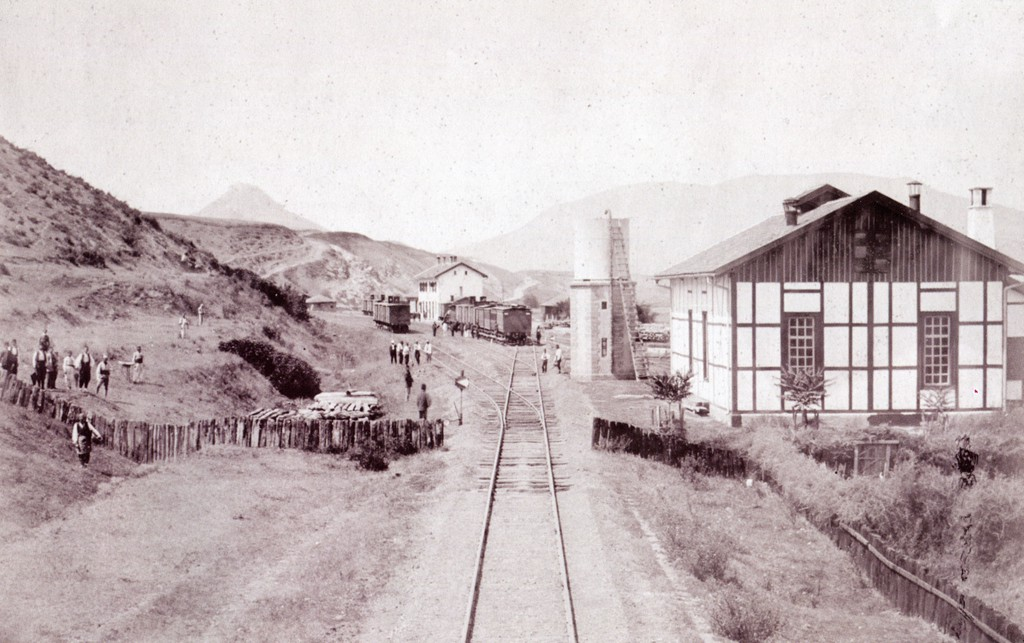
Railway station of Metroviça (Mitrovica)

On 11 April 1899, he became the staff officer of 18th Regular Division under the command of Şemsi Pasha at Metroviça (present day Mitrovica) of the Third Army. He studied Serbian, Bulgarian, Albanian languages to read their newspapers for collecting information. On 20 April 1900, he was promoted to the rank of Kolağası, on 20 April 1902, Major (Binbaşı), on 19 July 1906, Lieutenant Colonel (Kaymakam) and on 17 December 1907, Miralay.

According to some researchers, he was in contact with Committee of Union and Progress and elected the member of the secret board of directors of the Metroviça branch of the committee. On 3 July 1908, Senior Captain Ahmed Niyazi Bey stationed at Resne (present day: Resen), an ethnic Albanian, took to the hills with 200 soldiers and a number of civilians, and issued a manifesto which demanded the restoration of constitutional government. Şemsi Pasha, an ethnic Albanian, was ordered to crush the rebel and went to Monastir with two battalions. But he was shot and killed by then Second Lieutenant Bigalı Atıf Bey.

On 19 August 1909, he was demoted to major, because of the Law for the Purge of Military Ranks.

On 29 December 1908 he was appointed as governor and commander of Taşlıca (present day Pljevlja), and at the same time, the commander of the 35th Brigade . On 15 January 1910, he was temporarily assigned to the headquarters of the Kosovo Provisional Corps, on 29 September, he was promoted to the rank of lieutenant colonel and on 27 July, became the chief of staff of the same corps.

On 15 January 1911, he was assigned to the 4th department of the General Staff. On 2 October 1911, when he was staying in İşkodra (present day: Shkodër), because Italo-Turkish War (29 September 1911 – 18 October 1912) broke out, he was assigned to the Western Army that was formed for the defense of Western Rumelia under the command of Birinci Ferik Ali Rıza Pasha. On 6 October, he was appointed governor of İpek Sancağı (present day District of Peja). On 19 October, he went back to Istanbul to continue his task at the 4th department of the General Staff. On 11 February 1912, he was appointed to the member of the committee that was formed under the chairmanship of the Minister of the Interior Hacı Adil Bey with the decision about reform of Albania and three vilayet (Salonica, Monastir, Kosova). 9 May, he was appointed to a secretariat formed in the Sadaret and on 3 July, to the deputy commander of the 21st Infantry Division at Yakova (now Gjakova), on 6 August, to the staff of the General Forces of Kosovo .

=== Balkan Wars ===
On 29 September 1912, he was appointed to the chief of the 1st department (chief of operations) of the Vardar Army under the command of Ferik Halepli Zeki Pasha, formed within the Western Army. During the First Balkan War (8 October 1912 – 30 May 1913), after the defeat at the Battle of Kumanovo ( 23–24 October 1912), Fevzi wrote that the distributions of the Ottoman forces over a wide area gave initiative to the enemy and that mobilization and concentration plan was poorly designed and flawed. He also noted that there were great deficiencies in artillery, wireless, and air units. But he wrote that he had put the idea of creating a six-corps army of one hundred thousand men operation on interior lines from the Monastir (present day: Bitola) area. The Vardar Army retreated to Monastir.

On 16 November, during the Battle of Monastir ( 16–19 November 1912), his younger brother Muhtar Efendi was killed in action at the heights of Oblakovo, northwest of Bitola. After the defeat at the Battle of Bitola, he wrote that the Vardar Army's effective strength for its 78 infantry battalions was 39,398 men. The Vardar Army retreated to Albania. On 10 May, because Colonel Ibrahim Halil Bey (Sedes), who was the chief of staff of the Vardar Army, went to Istanbul, and Fevzi was deputized the chief of staff. On 19 June, the headquarters of the Vardar Army evacuated from the pier on the Seman aboard the steamships Karadeniz and Gülcemal and arrived at Istanbul on 22 June.

Fevzi wrote:

On the morning of June 6, 1329, Karadeniz, in late afternoon Gülcemal, left pier at Seman. I also got on board Gülcemal. We've bid farewell to five centuries of Turkish rule of Western Rumelia. When the sun went down, the coast of Albania was gradually ceasing to be visible in front of our eyes. The cession of the part of our homeland, where our ancestors irrigated with their blood for centuries and many old and new martyrs were buried, brought unacceptable heartbreak and nostalgia to our hearts. Today, Western Rumelia that is the victim of ignorance and politics, was fluttering in pathetic sorrows.

On 2 August 1913, he was appointed to the commander of the Ankara Reserve Division, on 6 November, to the commander of the 2nd Infantry Division and on 24 November, he was promoted to the rank of colonel.

=== World War I ===
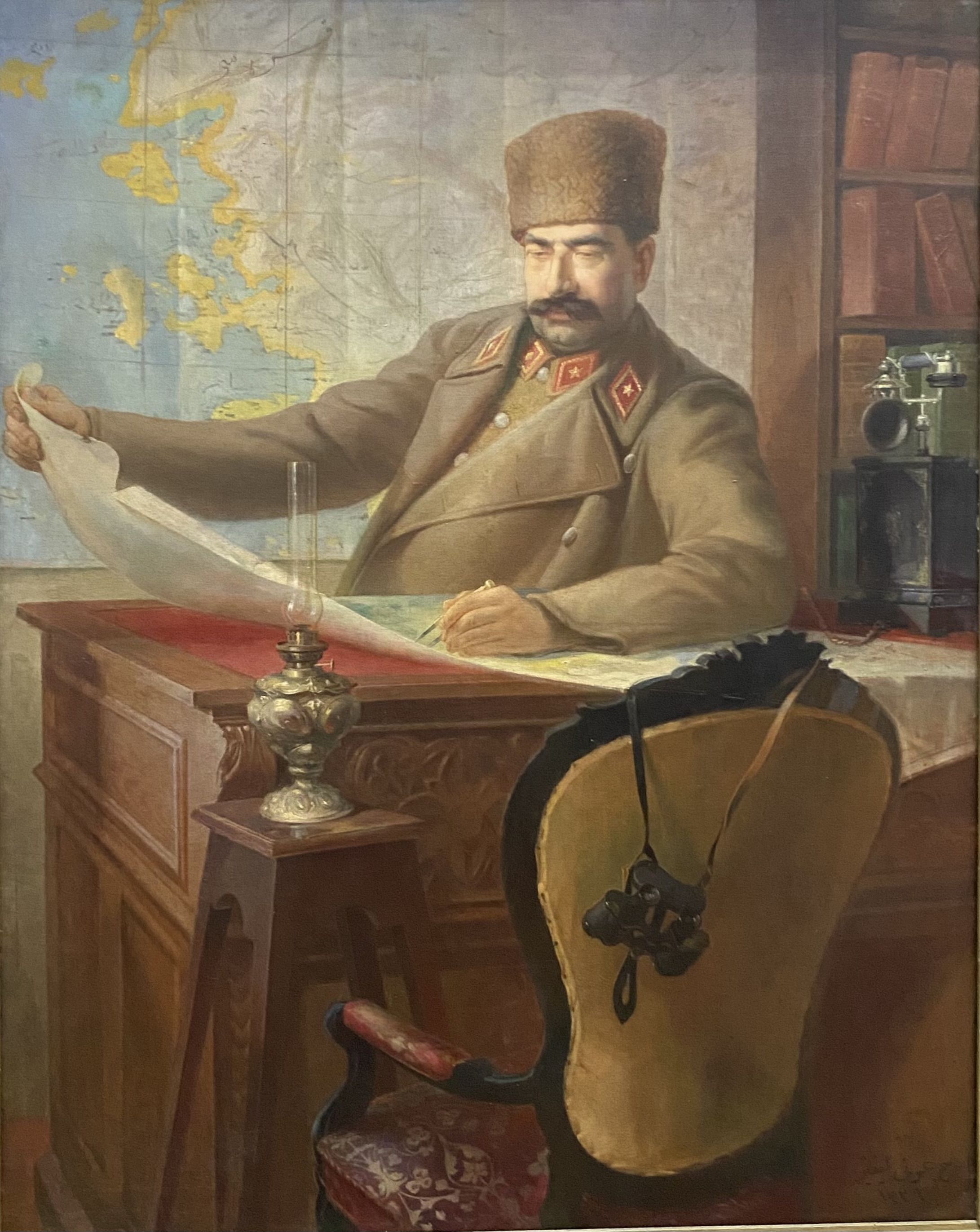
Portrait of Marashall Fevzi Çakmak by Hüseyin Avni Lifij

On 22 December 1913, he was appointed to the commander of the V Corps. His corps engaged in the defense of Gallipoli. On 2 March 1915, he was promoted to the rank of Mirliva. He arrived at the Gallipoli Front on 13 July and command his corps in battles of Achi Baba (İkinci Kerevizdere Muharebesi) and Sari Bair. On 8 August, his younger brother, the commander of the 1st Company of the 2nd Battalion of the 64th Regiment, Lieutenant Mehmed Nazif Efendi was killed in action in the Battle of Chunuk Bair.

On 6 December 1915, he served concurrently as the commander of the Anafartalar Group. In April 1916, he was appointed to the 3rd military district of Eastern Front and on 7 September 1916, to the commander of II Caucasian Corps, which consisted of the 5th, 11th and 37th Caucasian divisions. On 5 July 1917, he was appointed to the commander of the Second Army at Diyarbekir.

On 9 October 1917, he was assigned to the command of the Seventh Army at the Sinai and Palestine Front and he remained in Aleppo until 18 October and began to move his headquarters forward to Halilürrahman and arrived there on 23 October. Erich von Falkenhayn gave Fevzi control of Beersheba and the eastern half of the Palestine Front on 28 October. But Falkenhayn gave an alternate set of orders on the same day, giving command of all units on the Sinai Front to Kress von Kressenstein until the new command arrangements would become functional

On 15 February 1918, he wrote to Erich von Falkenhayn, serious problems with the inefficient lines of communication and the supply and recruiting zone proportionate with the strength and situation of the army. Moreover, he mentioned that here were combat skills proficiency problems caused by the inability of his under-strength army to withdraw front-line units for training in the rear area.

On 28 July 1918, he was promoted to the rank of Ferik. But in August 1918 he fell ill and went to Istanbul to get medical treatment.

After World War I, on 24 December 1918, Fevzi Pasha was appointed to the Chief of the General Staff of the Ottoman Empire. In April 1919, he met with Şevket Turgut Pasha, Cevat Pasha secretly in Constantinople and prepared a report called "Trio Oath" (Üçler Misâkı) to establish army inspectorate for the defense of homeland. In late April, Fevzi Pasha submitted this report to the Minister of War Şakir Pasha. On 30 April 1919, the War Ministry and Sultan Mehmed VI ratified the decision about the establishing of army inspectorates that had been accepted by the Chief of General Staff On 14 May 1919, he was appointed to the commander of the Inspector of the 1st Army Troops Inspectorate (Birinci Ordu Kıt'aatı Müfettişi). On 3 November, he assigned to the task in Heyet-i Nasîha and on 31 December, he was appointed to the member of the Military Council (Askerî Şûra). He became the Minister of War of Ali Rıza Pasha Cabinet (3 February – 3 March 1920) and Salih Pasha Cabinet (8 March – 2 April 1920).

== War of Independence ==
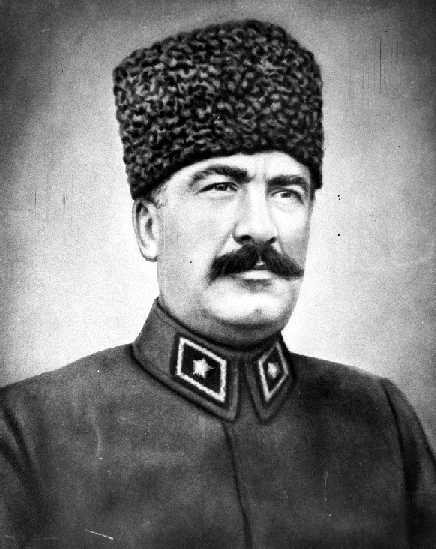
A portrait of Fevzi Çakmak

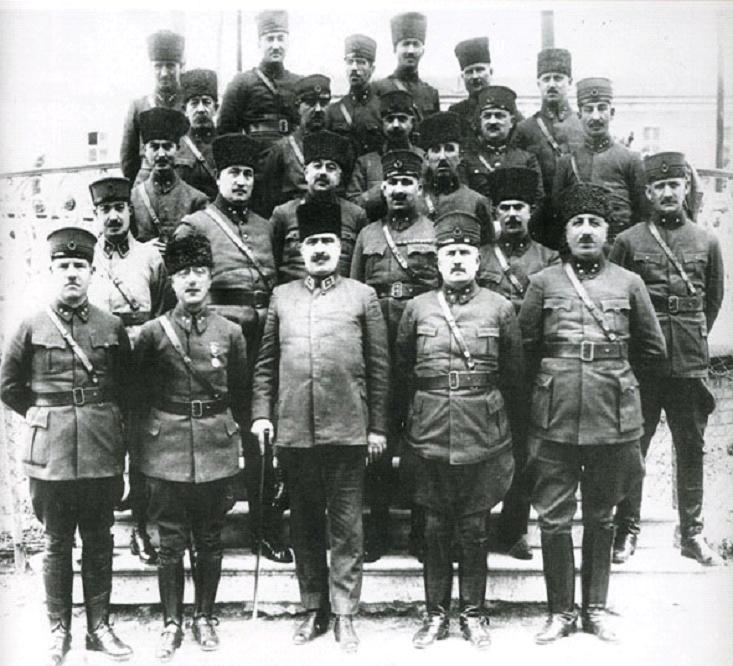
Commanders of the Army of Ankara government: 1st line: Ferik Ali Fuat (Cebesoy), Ferik Cevat (Çobanlı), Müşir Fevzi (Çakmak), Ferik Kâzım Karabekir, Ferik Fahrettin (Altay); 2nd line： Mirliva Kazım (İnanç), Mirliva Ali Sait (Akbaytogan), Mirliva Ali Hikmet (Ayerdem), Mirliva Kemalettin Sami (Gökçen), Mirliva Cafer Tayyar (Eğilmez), Mirliva İzzettin (Çalışlar), Mirliva Şükrü Naili (Gökberk); 3rd line: Mirliva Asım (Gündüz), Miralay Alaaddin (Koval), Mirliva Mehmet Sabri (Erçetin), Miralay Sabit (Noyan), Miralay Ömer Halis (Bıyıktay)

After the resignation of Salih Pasha Cabinet, he went to Anatolia to participate in the national movement arriving at Ankara on 27 April 1920. On 3 May, he was elected the Minister of Defense (Milli Müdafaa Vekili) and Vice Prime Minister (Heyet-i Vekile Riyaseti Vekili) as a parliamentary deputy from Kozan.

The Ottoman Military Court declared a death sentence for him, in absentia. This sentence was published in Takvim-i Vakayi newspaper on 30 May 1920.

He became one of the founders of the "Official" Communist Party established on 18 October 1920.

On 9 November, in addition to his existing tasks, he was temporarily appointed Vice Minister of the Chief of the General Staff, because the Chief of the General Staff İsmet Bey was continuously at the front as the commander of Western Front. On 24 January 1921, in addition to his other tasks, he became Prime Minister (Heyet-i Vekile Riyaseti) and on 3 April, he was promoted to Birinci Ferik.

=== Battle of Kütahya-Eskişehir ===
Fevzi Çakmak took control of the Army after the Turkish loss in Kütahya-Altıntaş under İsmet Bey (İnönü) and was able to stop the retreat of the Army of Grand National Assembly afterward.

=== Battle of Sakarya ===
Before the Battle of Sakarya, on 5 August 1921, he resigned as the Minister of War and was appointed the Minister of the Chief of the General Staff.

The Army of Grand National Assembly defeated the Greek forces at the Battle of Sakarya on the outskirts of Ankara.

On 12 July 1922, he resigned as the prime minister.

=== Great Offensive ===
Fevzi Çakmak and Mustafa Kemal planned and commandeered the Battle of Dumlupınar. On 31 August 1922, he was promoted to rank of Müşir (Mareşal) with the recommendation of Mustafa Kemal.

They were and still are the only field marshals in Republic of Turkey so an unspecified nickname Mareşal (Field Marshal) is usually understood as referring to Fevzi Çakmak.

== Republican era ==
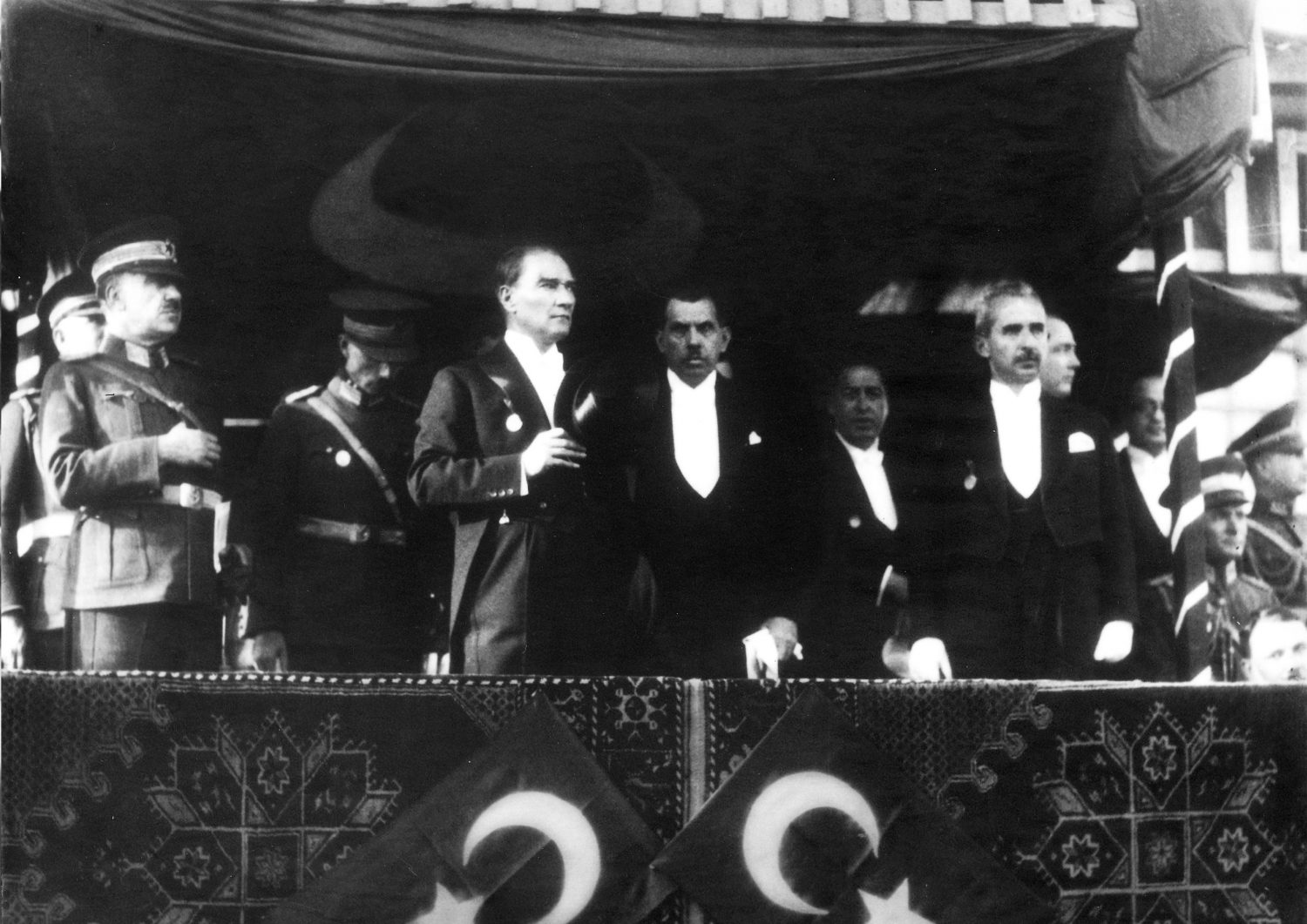
Mustafa Kemal's 1933 speech at the 10th anniversary of the Republic of Turkey, left to right: Chief of General Staff Mareşal Fevzi (Çakmak), President Gazi Mustafa Kemal (Atatürk), Speaker of the Grand National Assembly Kâzım Köprülü (Özalp), Prime Minister İsmet (İnönü)

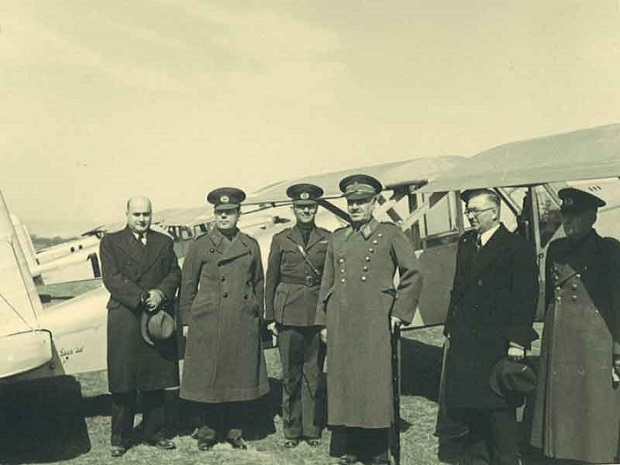
Fevzi Çakmak posing in front of an aircraft

=== Mosul offensive plan ===
Regarding the Mosul question, Çakmak supported the idea of a Turkish military offensive in accordance with Misak-i Milli to retake the city of Mosul from the British Mandatory Iraq and annex it into the new Turkish Republic, however the Treaty of Lausanne which was signed on 24 July 1923 confirmed that the possession of Mosul would remain within British Iraq.

On 14 August 1923, he was elected a deputy from Istanbul.

On 3 March 1924, he was appointed as the Chief of the General Staff of the Republic of Turkey.

He quit politics by resigning from the parliament on 31 October 1924.

=== Member of the Reform Council in the East ===
In September 1925, after the suppression of the Sheikh Said rebellion, he was a member of the Reform Council of the East (Turkish: Şark Islahat Encümeni) which delivered the Report for Reform in the East (Turkish: Şark İslahat Raporu), which recommended the suppression of Kurdish elite and the establishment of Inspectorates-General that were governed by Martial Law. Following this report, three of such Inspectorates–General were established in the Kurdish areas.

=== Views on Kurds ===
In 1930, he complained that the Kurds would still demand their right for self-determination like it was described in the Fourteen Points provided by US president Woodrow Wilson following the end of World War I, and demanded the exclusion of any Kurdish nationalist from the administration in Erzincan.

=== Candidate to be Atatürk's successor ===
His name was mentioned as a possible successor of Atatürk and as a Turkish war hero he was very respected amongst the Turkish political and civil society. But he denied his interest of becoming president mentioning Ismet Inönü as the official candidate.

He retired on 12 January 1944.

Çakmak was a candidate on the 1946 Turkish presidential election for the Democrat Party.

== Death ==
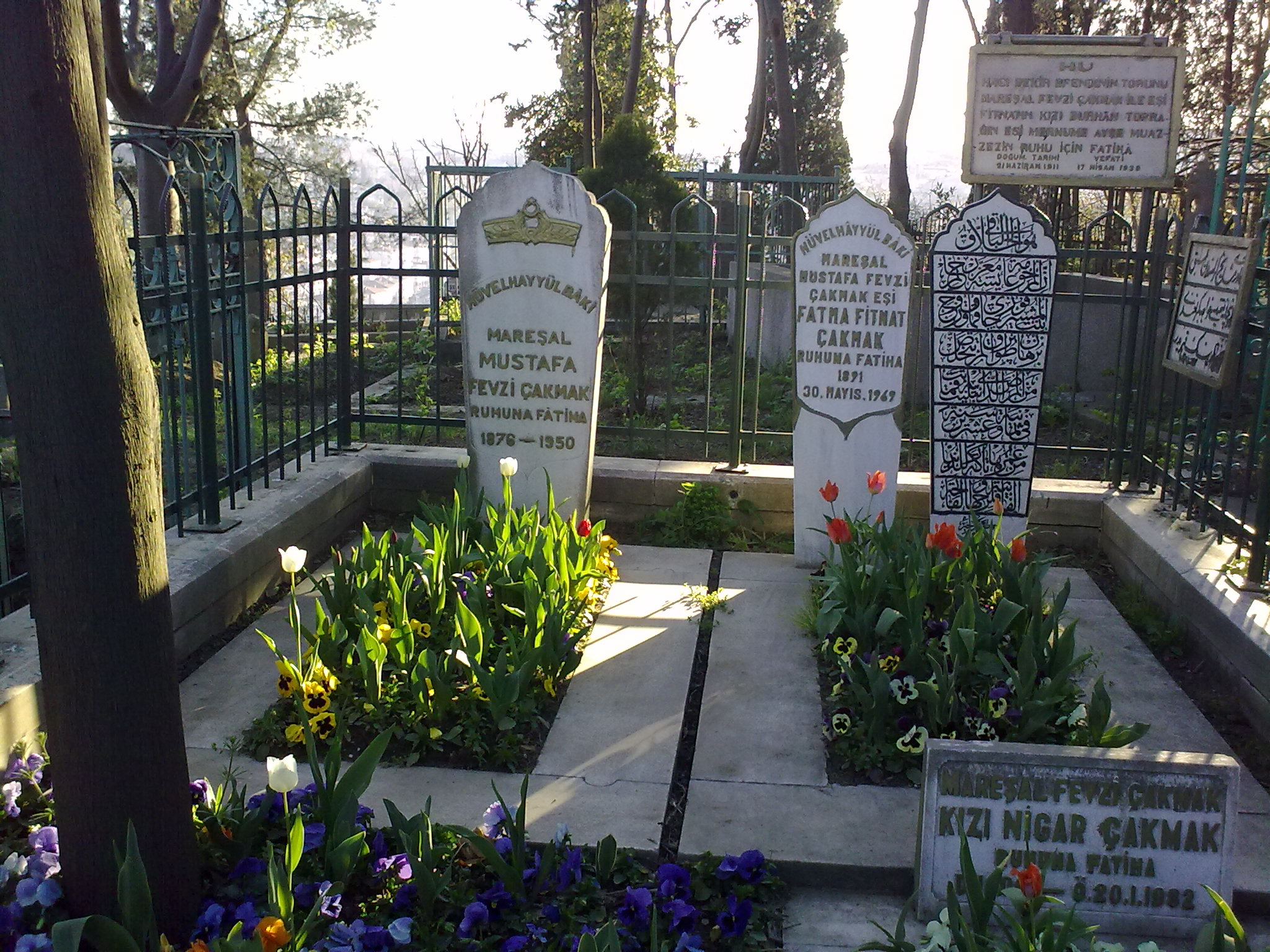
Fevzi Çakmak's tomb

He died on the morning of 10 April 1950 in his house in Teşvikiye. His funeral service was held at the Beyazıt Mosque and he was laid to rest in Eyüp Cemetery, Istanbul, on 12 April 1950. His family rejected an effort to exhume his body and effect a transfer to Turkish State Cemetery in Ankara.

He knew French, English, German, Russian, Persian, Arabic, Albanian, and Bosnian. He spoke French and translated English and German.

== Medals and decorations ==
- Imtiyaz Medal in Silver (23 January 1900)
- Order of Medjidie, 5th class (22 August 1900)
- Order of Osmanieh, 4th class (17 July 1906)
- Harp Madalyası (2 October 1915)
- Silver (18 November 1915)
- Iron Cross, 2nd class (Germany, 26 December 1915)
- Gold Liakat Medal (17 January 1916)
- War Medal (Germany, 21 October 1916)
- İmtiyaz Medal in Gold (11 November 1916)
- Military Merit Cross, 2nd class (Austria-Hungary, 3 April 1917)
- Order of the Osmanî with Swords, 2nd class (23 September 1917)
- Order of the Osmanî with Swords, 1st class (7 January 1918)
- Order of the Crown (Württemberg, 19 June 1918)
- Medal of Independence with Red-Green Ribbon (21 November 1923) & Citation

== Works ==
- Fevzi Çakmak (Mareşal), Garbî Rumeli'nin Suret-i Ziya-ı ve Balkan Harbinde Garp Cephesi Hakkında. Konferanslar, Erkan-ı Harbiye Mektebi Matbaası, İstanbul, 1927.
- Mareşal Fevzi Çakmak, Büyük Harpte Şark Cephesi Hareketleri, Gen.Kur. Basımevi, Ankara, 1936.

== Family tree ==
Kamile (?–1915)	Limnili Hacı Derviş; Hüseyin Kaptan (1782?–1897/98)	Üzile	Hoca Bekir Efendi (1815–1898)	Fitnat
Hasan Vasfi (1858–1927)	Hacı Rasim (1870–1945)	Tevfik	Ali Sırrı (1855/6-1914)	Hesna	Ayşe Şahver	Ali Nuri (1866–1901)	Emine Eda
Mehmed Nazif (1882 – 8 August 1915 †)	Muhtar (1884 – 16 November 1912 †)	Sami (1892–1909)	Nebahat (1894–1986)
MUSTAFA FEVZİ ÇAKMAK ("Mareşal")	Fatma Fitnat (1891–1969)	Münir
M. Şefik Çakmak (1892–1966)	Nigar Çakmak (1909–1982)	A. Muazzez (1911–1939)	Burhan Toprak (1906–1967)
Professor emeritus of Princeton University; Ahmet Şefik Çakmak (1934–)	Noriko Nagafuji Çakmak; Ja チャクマク・長藤紀子 (1949–)
Erika Leila (1972–)	Lisa Ayla (1978–)

== See also ==
- List of high-ranking commanders of the Turkish War of Independence

Political offices
Preceded by Hulusi Salih (Kezrak)	Minister of War of the Ottoman Empire; 3 February 1920 – 3 March 1920	Vacant Title next held by Himself
Vacant Title last held by Himself	Minister of War of the Ottoman Empire; 8 March 1920 – 2 April 1920	Succeeded by Damat Ferid
New title	Minister of National Defense of the Ankara Government; 3 May 1920 – 5 August 1921	Succeeded by Refet (Bele)
Preceded by Mustafa Kemal (Atatürk)	Prime Minister of the Ankara Government; 24 January 1921 – 9 July 1922	Succeeded by Rauf (Orbay)
Military offices
Preceded by Mustafa Kemal (Atatürk) (as proxy)	Commander of the Second Army; 5 July 1917 – 9 October 1917	Succeeded by Mustafa Kemal (Atatürk) (never assumed)
Preceded by Mustafa Kemal (Atatürk)	Commander of the Seventh Army; 9 October 1917 – 7 August 1918	Succeeded by Mustafa Kemal (Atatürk)
Preceded by Cevat (Çobanlı)	Chief of the General Staff of the Ottoman Empire; 24 December 1918 – 14 May 1919	Succeeded by Cevat (Çobanlı)
Preceded by İsmet (İnönü)	Chief of the General Staff of the Ankara Government; 5 August 1921 – 29 October 1923	Office disestablished
New office	Chief of the General Staff of Turkey; 29 October 1923 – 12 January 1944	Succeeded by Kâzım Orbay
