= XX Corps (Ottoman Empire) =

XX Corps Yirminci Kolordu
- Active: 1916–1920
- Country: Ottoman Empire
- Type: Corps
- Patron: Ottoman Sultan
- Engagements: Macedonian Front (World War I); Sinai and Palestine Campaign (World War I); Battle of Jerusalem; Battle of Megiddo

Commanders
- Notable commanders: Mirliva Abdul Kerim Pasha; Mirliva Ali Fuad Pasha (June 30, 1917-June 26, 1920)

The XX Corps of the Ottoman Empire (Turkish: 20 nci Kolordu or Yirminci Kolordu) was one of the corps of the Ottoman Army. It was formed during World War I.

== World War I ==
=== Order of Battle, December 1916 ===
In December 1916, the corps was structured as follows:

- XX Corps (Macedonian Front, Commander: Mirliva Abdülkerim Pasha)
  - 49th Division (Commander: Miralay Mahmut Bey), withdrawn to Turkey on March 19, 1917.
    - 144th Infantry Regiment (Commander: Kaymakam Adil Bey)
    - 145th Regiment (Commander: Binbaşı Ali Rıza Bey)
    - 146th Regiment (Commander: Kaymakam Schierholz)
    - 46th Artillery Regiment (Commander: Binbaşı M. Behçet Bey).
  - 50th Division (Commander: Kaymakam Şükrü Naili Bey, Chief of Staff: Yüzbaşı Tevfik Bey), withdrawn to Turkey in May 1917.
    - 157th Infantry Regiment (Commander: Kaymakam Akif Bey)
    - 158th Infantry Regiment (Commander: Binbaşı Nedim Bey)
    - 169th Inıfantry Regiment (Commander: Kaymakam Servet Bey)
    - 50th Artillery Regiment (Commander: Binbaşı Sadık Bey)

=== Order of Battle, August 1917 ===
In August 1917, the corps was structured as follows:

- XX Corps (Syria-Palestine), Commander was Ali Fuat Cebesoy
  - 16th Division, 54th Division

=== Order of Battle, June 1918, September 1918 ===
In June 1918, September 1918, the corps was structured as follows:

- XX Corps (Palestine)
  - 26th Division, 53rd Division

== After Mudros ==
=== Order of Battle, November 1918 ===
In November 1918, the corps was structured as follows:

- XX Corps (Syria)
  - 1st Division, 43rd Division

=== Order of Battle, January 1919 ===
In January 1919, the corps was structured as follows:

- XX Corps (Anatolia, Ereğli)
  - 23rd Division (Afyon)
    - 3rd Infantry Regiment, 58th Infantry Regiment, 143rd Infantry Regiment
  - 24th Division (Ereğeli)
    - 69th Infantry Regiment, 89th Infantry Regiment, 159th Infantry Regiment

== See also ==
- Macedonian front (World War I)
  - Monastir Offensive
