= II Caucasian Corps =

II Caucasian Corps İkinci Kafkas Kolordusu
- Active: September 1916–
- Country: Ottoman Empire
- Type: Corps
- Patron: Sultans of the Ottoman Empire
- Engagements: Caucasus Campaign (World War I)

Commanders
- Notable commanders: Mirliva Mustafa Fevzi Pasha (September 7-July 5, 1917); Mirliva Yakup Şevki Pasha (August 10, 1917-June 8, 1918)

The II Caucasian Corps of the Ottoman Empire (Turkish: 2 nci Kafkas Kolordusu or İkinci Kafkas Kolordusu) was one of the corps of the Ottoman Army. It was formed during World War I.

== Formations ==
=== Order of Battle, December 1916, August 1917, January 1918 ===
In December 1916, August 1917, January 1918, the corps was structured as follows:

- II Caucasian Corps (Caucasus)
  - 5th Caucasian Division, 11th Caucasian Division, 37th Caucasian Division
