= Mehmet Esat Bülkat =

Ottoman Army officer (1862–1952)

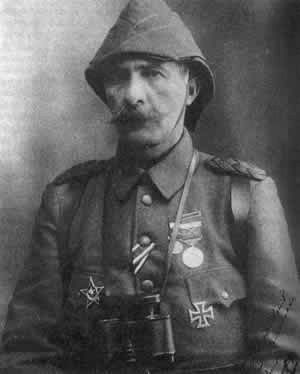
- Mehmed Esad Pasha in 1915
- Born: Mehmed Esad Pasha; 18 October 1862; Yanya, Ioannina Eyalet, Ottoman Empire (modern Ioannina, Greece)
- Died: 2 November 1952 (aged 90); Istanbul, Turkey
- Relatives: Wehib Pasha (brother)
- Military career
- Allegiance: Ottoman Empire
- Branch: Ottoman Army
- Service years: 1884–1919
- Rank: Lieutenant general
- Conflicts: Greco-Turkish War (1897); Balkan Wars; First Balkan War; Siege of Ioannina; Battle of Bizani; Battle of Pente Pigadia; World War I; Gallipoli campaign; Third attack on Anzac Cove; Battle of Lone Pine

Mehmet Esat Bülkat (Ottoman Turkish: محمد أسعد بولكات; 18 October 1862 – 2 November 1952) was a Turkish or Albanian officer of the Ottoman Army who fought during the First Balkan War, where he led the Yanya Corps, and in World War I, where he served as a senior commander in the Gallipoli campaign. Prior to the 1934 Surname Law, he was known as Mehmed Esad Pasha (أسعد باشا یانیه).

== Early life ==
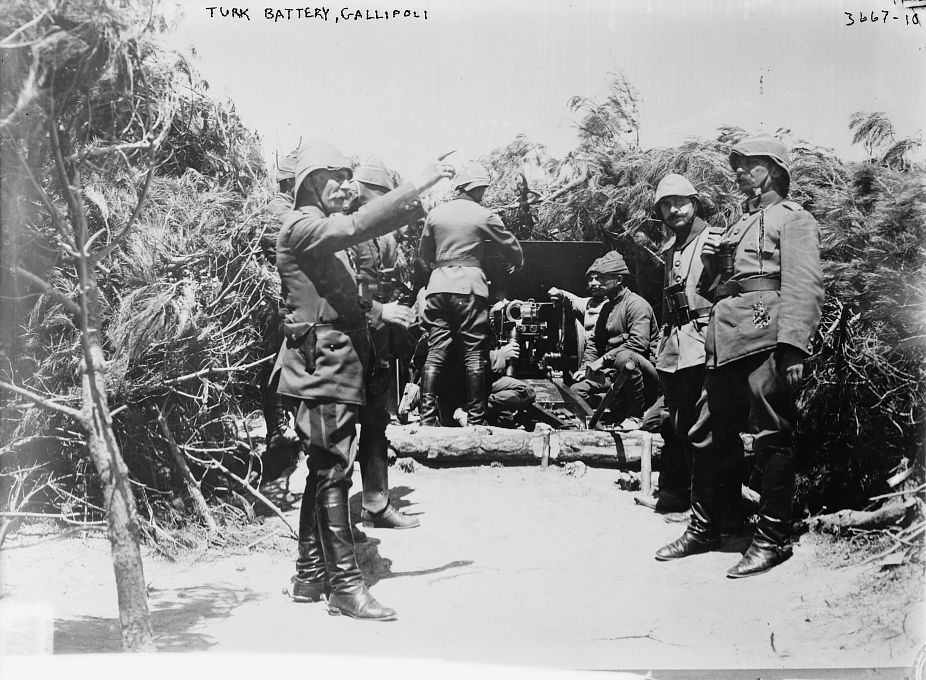
Esat Pasha delivering orders to the batteries at Anzac Cove

Mehmed Esad was born into a Turkish or Albanian Muslim family in Yanya (now Ioannina, Greece) on 18 October 1862, to Mehmed Emin Efendi, who had served as mayor of the city. According to his own statement, Mehmed Esad was a member of the Kaçı or Kaçın Turkmen family from Tashkent, Uzbekistan. He claimed to be the grandson of Taşkentli Mehmet Kaçı, the Turkish commander who conquered Ioannina during the reign of Sultan Murad II. His brother, Wehib Pasha (1877–1940) also became a distinguished general. His younger brother Mehmet Nakyettin Bey was the father of Kâzım Taşkent, the founder of Yapı Kredi, the first nationwide private bank in Turkey.

== Career ==
Esad spent the first seventeen years of his life in Yanya before attending the Kuleli Military High School at Monastir (modern Bitola, North Macedonia) in 1880. Although he had received a good education up until then and was very intelligent, he failed in his first year because of a poor understanding of Ottoman Turkish. He visited the Zosimaia School. At that time the medium of communication in Yanya was Greek, even for Muslims, so he took additional lessons to broaden his competency in the language. Having polished up his skills in Ottoman Turkish Esad then attended the Ottoman Military Academy, graduating at the top of his class in 1884.

After a period of service in a regiment, he was selected for the Ottoman Military College in 1887, graduating top of his class as a General Staff officer in 1890.

His excellent performance led to his immediate dispatch to undertake further military training in Germany. As well as attending the Prussian War Academy in Berlin, he spent periods in different Alsatian and Prussian units and headquarters. During his four years in Germany he became a fluent speaker of German, albeit with a thick Schwabisch accent. Upon his return to the Ottoman Empire in May 1894, Esad was assigned to the Intelligence Division of the General Staff. About this time he was promoted to Lt Colonel. As he found working in the General Staff not to his liking, he took up the less prestigious position a year later as a teacher at the Mekteb-i Erkân-ı Harbiyye-i Şâhâne (Imperial Military College). He took a break from teaching and, with a promotion to Colonel, served as Chief of Staff of the 1st Infantry Division during the Greco-Turkish War of 1897. He returned to the academy and in 1899 was appointed its dean of academics, serving in this position until 1906. Among his students was Mustafa Kemal. Due to his achievements in military education at the Military College, he came to the attention of Sultan Abdul Hamid II and his Ottoman and German military advisers which ensured his promotion to Mirliva (Major General) in 1901 and to Ferik (Lieutenant General) on 17 January 1906.

In 1907 he was appointed Acting Commander of the Third Army at Thessaloniki. At this time there were a number of young officers in various secret organisations under the leadership of Committee of Union and Progress (CUP) conspiring against the authoritarian regime of Sultan Abdul Hamid II. Despite his brother Wehib being one of the ringleaders Esad stayed away from politics, even though the Third Army was the nerve centre of the CUP. Esad also remained aloof from government efforts to combat and prosecute partisan officers, most of whom were his previous students. This earned him the displeasure of the Sultan which caused him to be dismissed from duty a year later and placed under surveillance. Although the conspiracy in the form of the Young Turk Revolution was eventually successful and forced the Sultan to accept their demands Esad did not benefit and was instead treated as a functionary of the old regime and demoted to the rank of Mirliva (Major General). Eventually his loyalty was rewarded with the command in December 1910 of the 5th Regular (Redif) Division stationed at the town of Gelibolu on the Gallipoli Peninsula and then three months later command of the II Army Corps which was based at Rodosto. He spent only a year with this command before being posted to his former hometown of Yanya to command the 23rd Regular Division.

=== First Balkan War ===
Upon the outbreak of the First Balkan War Esad was immediately detached from his divisional command and placed in charge of the newly activated independent Yanya Corps, tasked with defending the well-fortified city and the wider region of Epirus. Efficiently organising his limited resources he pursued an active defence Esad succeeded in defending Yanya for three months against the Greek Army with constant counter-attacks, before being finally forced to capitulate after the Battle of Bizani on 4–6 March 1913.

Esad remained in Greek captivity as a prisoner of war until 2 December 1913. His defence of Yanya however had earned him the status of a popular hero, as well as the honorific title of "Pasha". Despite the demanding conditions and eventual defeat Esad gained valuable insight into modern warfare in particular the importance of defence and the issues caused by a poorly prepared offensive. He also developed a cautious approach to combat and a belief that his soldier's lives were only expendable if they resulted in permanent results.

=== III Corps ===
Almost immediately upon his return from captivity, not only did he receive credit for his defense of Yanya but he also avoided the large-scale purge at the end of the war of the army officer corps. on 10 December 1913, he was appointed commander of the III Corps. On taking up his command Esad was determined to resolve the problems that had become apparent during the Balkan Wars. While a demanding commander Esad had a kindly forgiving nature and believed in leading and training rather than pushing and punishing. As a result, when he identified that a number of his officers were ineffective, he gave them a second chance. However once it became apparent to him that this was misplaced, he had by September 1914 replaced them, most notably his chief of staff. Esad's identification and development of capable officers combined with the fighting experience that had been gained by corps units and soldiers during the wars and the initiation by Esad of an extensive training program allowed the III Corps to quickly establish itself as one of the most combat-worthy formations in the Ottoman Army. As a result, units under his command were used as rapid reaction forces and dispatched to various crises and often never returned. An example was the loss of a battalion of the 26th Regiment to Basra to provide security against a threat from Ibn Suud of Najd. Esad also paid particular attention to the administrative and logistical areas of his command. As a result, when the Ottoman Army mobilized on 2 August 1914 at the commencement of World War I, the III Corp was the only one to do so within the prescribed timeframe.

=== World War I ===
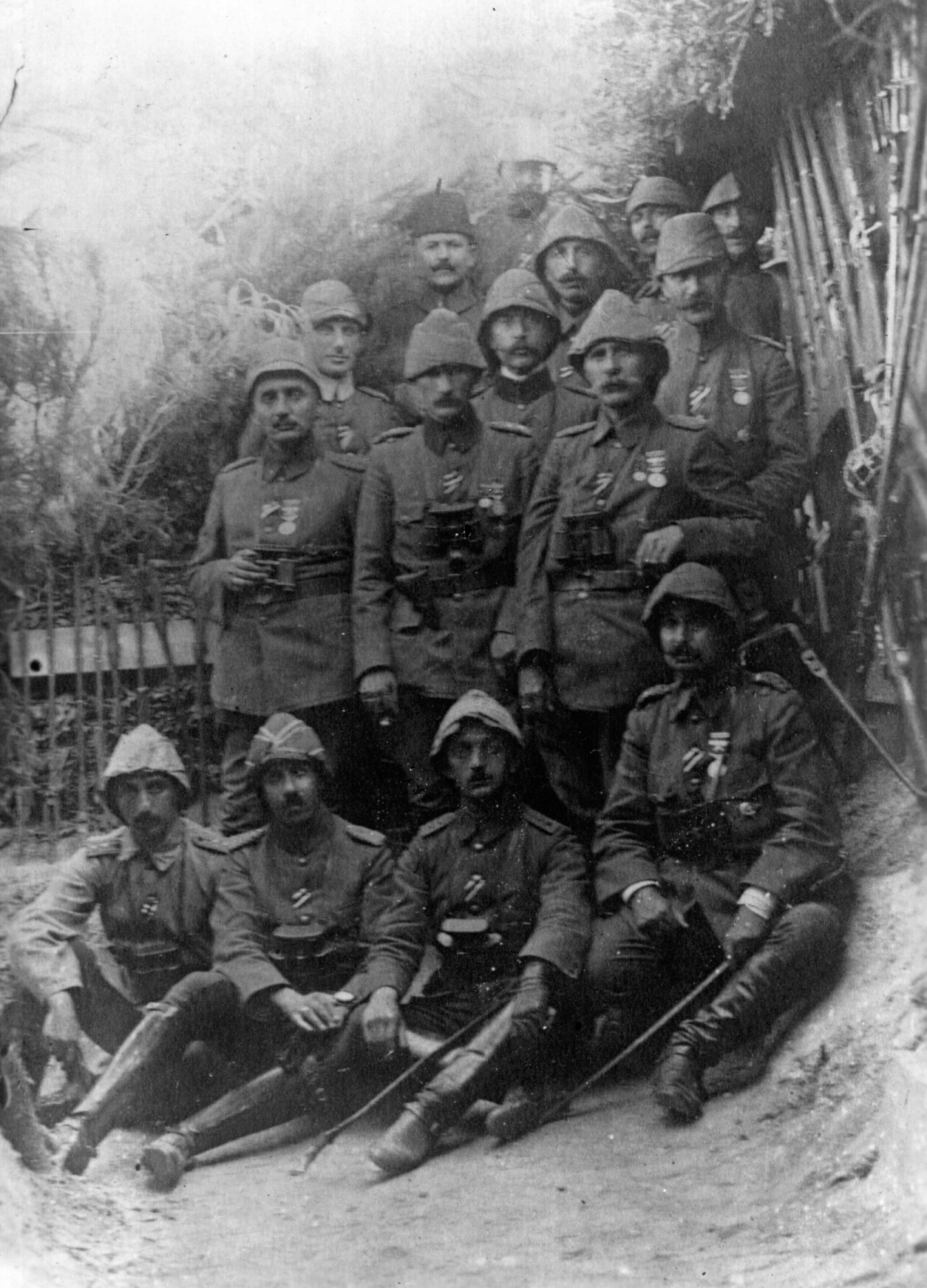
Mehmed Esad Pasha and his men. From left to right: Sitting: Major Haydar Bey, Major Mehmed Hulusi Bey, Yüzbaşı Mehmet Nâzım Bey (Chief of Staff 16th Division), unknown, First row: Colonel Rushidi Bey (commander of 16th Division, Colonel Mustafa Kemal Bey (commander of 19th Division), General Esad Pasha, Middle row: Kaymakam Wilhelm Willmer (commander of Anafaralar region, unknown German officer, Colonel Hans Kannengiesser, Back row: Major Ohrili Kemal Bey (Chief of Operations, III Corps), Kaymakam Fahreddin Bey (Chief of Staff, III Corps), Major Izzeddin Bey

The III Corps (which had a total strength of 43,000 men plus logistics and commissariat troops) was assigned the task of reinforcing the Gallipoli Peninsula and Asiatic coast to defend against enemy landings. To undertake this role Esad moved his headquarters to the Dardanelles on 2 November 1914. The excellent reputation of the Esad's Corps bought problems during the early days of mobilization with the reassigning of its 8th Division to Syria to which Esad responded by activating the 19th Division from depot regiments. Then he was forced to exchange the 55th and 56th regiments of this new division with the 72nd and 77th regiments from Syria. In response Esad raised new units from scratch.

Although most accounts of the Gallipoli Campaign tend to focus on the role of Fifth Army's commander, German General Liman von Sanders, and on Mehmed Esad's subordinate, Mustafa Kemal, it was Esad who prepared the Ottoman defences prior to the battle. Although he did not handle the command crisis well during the confusion of the initial Allied landing on 25 April 1915 he played an important role in actively commanding the Ottoman Army during the remainder of the Gallipoli campaign.

While he had become well known to the general public during the Gallipoli campaign, upon its completion despite been promoted back to the rank of Ferik (Lieutenant General) on 15 September 1915 Esad was not assigned any other active command roles by Enver Pasha. On 3 November 1915, Esad was appointed as CO of First Army, succeeding Colmar Freiherr von der Goltz, who was being dispatched to the Mesopotamian front. In this role he undertook the training of recruits destined for other commands but otherwise mostly performed protocol duties. In late 1917, Esad visited Germany and toured the German fronts.

On 21 February 1918 he was placed in command of the Fifth Army, headquartered at Bandırma, and then on 22 June in that same year, of the Third Army headquartered at Batumi on the Caucasus front. However, in the latter role there was little time to take part in operations before the Armistice of Mudros brought an end to fighting. During the armistice period (1918–1922) Esad was assigned to be the Inspector-General of the mostly demobilized Second Army and military schools. However, the position existed only on paper. Convinced that he had little chance of being promoted to any meaningful role he retired from the army on 22 November 1919. In 1920, Esad served as Navy Minister in the short-lived cabinet of Hulusi Salih Pasha, whose cabinet was forced to resign after the Allied occupation of Istanbul on 2 April 1920. He then joined the forces of Mustafa Kemal and took part in the Turkish War of Independence.

In response to the Surname Law he adopted the surname "Bülkat" in 1934.

In his retirement he wrote two unpublished works, "Çanakkale Hatıraları" (Dardanelles Memories) (6 volumes) and "1912–1913 Balkan War".

A selection of his memoirs was published in 1975 under the title Esat Paşa'nın Çanakkale Anıları (Esat Pasha's Çanakkale Memoirs).

He died in Istanbul on 2 November 1952 and was buried in the Karacaahmet Cemetery.
