= I Corps (Ottoman Empire) =

I Corps 1 nci Kolordu / Birinci Kolordu
- Active: 1911–
- Country: Ottoman Empire
- Type: Corps
- Garrison/HQ: Harbiye, Constantinople
- Patron: Sultans of the Ottoman Empire
- Engagements: Gallipoli Campaign (World War I)

The I Corps of the Ottoman Empire (Turkish: 1 nci Kolordu or Birinci Kolordu) was one of the corps of the Ottoman Army consisting of ethnic Albanians. It was formed in the early 20th century during Ottoman military reforms.

== Formation ==
=== Order of Battle, 1911 ===
With further reorganization of the Ottoman Army, to include the creation of corps-level headquarters, by 1911 the I Corps was headquartered in Harbiye. Before the First Balkan War in 1911, the corps was structured as such:

- I Corps, Harbiye, Constantinople (Ferik Zeki Pasha)
  - 1st Infantry Division, Harbiye, Constantinople
    - 1st Infantry Regiment, Harbiye, Constantinople
    - 2nd Infantry Regiment, Bakırköy, Constantinople
    - 3rd Infantry Regiment, İşkodra
    - 1st Rifle Battalion, Taksim, Constantinople
    - 1st Field Artillery Regiment, Taksim, Constantinople
    - 1st Division Band, Harbiye, Constantinople
  - 2nd Infantry Division, Selimiye, Constantinople (Mirliva Prens Aziz Pasha)
    - 4th Infantry Regiment, İşkodra
    - 5th Infantry Regiment, Selimiye, Constantinople
    - 6th Infantry Regiment, Selimiye, Constantinople
    - 2nd Rifle Battalion, Selimiye, Constantinople
    - 2nd Field Artillery Regiment, Selimiye, Constantinople
    - 2nd Division Band, Selimiye, Constantinople
  - 3rd Infantry Division, Pangaltı, Constantinople (Mirliva Osman Pasha)
    - 7th Infantry Regiment, Taşkışla, Constantinople
    - 8th Infantry Regiment, Taşkışla, Constantinople
    - 9th Infantry Regiment, Kağıthane, Constantinople
    - 3rd Rifle Battalion, Tophane, Constantinople
    - 3rd Field Artillery Regiment, Rami Kışlası, Constantinople
    - 3rd Division Band, Taşkışla, Constantinople
- Units of I Corps
- 1st Rifle Regiment, Yıldız, Constantinople
- 1st Cavalry Brigade, Davutpaşa, Constantinople
  - 1st Cavalry Regiment, Yıldız, Constantinople
  - 2nd Cavalry Regiment, Davutpaşa, Constantinople
- 2nd Cavalry Brigade, Davutpaşa, Constantinople
  - 3rd Cavalry Regiment, Davutpaşa, Constantinople
  - 4th Cavalry Regiment, Selimiye, Constantinople
- 1st Horse Artillery Battalion, Davutpaşa, Constantinople
- 1st Mountain Artillery Battalion, Münzevî Kışlası, Constantinople
- 1st Field Howitzer Battalion, Gümüşsuyu, Constantinople
- 1st Engineer Battalion, İplikhane, Constantinople
- 1st Telegraph Battalion, Ertuğrul Kışlası, Constantinople
- 1st Medical Battalion, Ahırkapı, Constantinople
- 1st Railroad Battalion, Ahırkapı, Constantinople
- 2nd Railroad Battalion, Ahırkapı, Constantinople
- War Academy, Harbiye, Constantinople
  - Cavalry Squadron, Harbiye, Constantinople
  - Infantry Company, Harbiye, Constantinople
  - Provisional Companies x 2, Harbiye, Constantinople
  - Machine-gun Company, Harbiye, Constantinople
- Bosporus Fortified Area Command, Bosporus, Constantinople
  - 1st Heavy Artillery Regiment, Bosporus, Constantinople
  - 2nd Heavy Artillery Regiment, Bosporus, Constantinople
  - Searchlight Detachment, Bosporus, Constantinople
  - Torpedo Detachment, Bosporus, Constantinople
  - Mine Detachment, Bosporus, Constantinople
  - Wireless Detachment, Bosporus, Constantinople

== Balkan Wars ==
=== Order of Battle, October 17, 1912 ===
On October 17, 1912, the corps was structured as follows:

- I Corps (Thrace, under the command of the Eastern Army)
  - 2nd Division, 3rd Division
  - 1st Provisional Division

=== Order of Battle, October 29, 1912 ===
On October 29, 1912, the corps was structured as follows:

- I Corps (Thrace, under the command of the First Eastern Army)
  - 2nd Division, 3rd Division
  - 1st Provisional Division, Uşak Redif Division

=== Order of Battle, November 17, 1912 ===
On November 17, 1912, the corps was structured as follows:

- I Corps (Thrace, under the command of the Chataldja Army)
  - 2nd Division, 3rd Division
  - South Wing Detachment
- I Provisional Reserve Corps
  - 29th Division
  - Ergli Redif Division, Kayseri Redif Division

=== Order of Battle, March 25, 1913 ===
On March 25, 1913, the corps was structured as follows:

- I Corps (Thrace, under the command of the Chataldja Army)
  - 2nd Division
  - Fatih Redif Division
- I Provisional Reserve Corps
  - 29th Division,
  - Ergli Redif Division, Kayseri Redif Division

=== Order of Battle, July 1913 ===
- I Corps (Thrace)
  - 2nd Division, 28th Division, Fatih Infantry Division

== World War I ==
=== Order of Battle, August 1914, November 1914 ===
In August 1914, November 1914, the corps was structured as follows:

- I Corps (Thrace)
  - 1st Division, 2nd Division, 3rd Division

=== Order of Battle, Late April 1915 ===
In late April 1915, the corps was structured as follows:

- I Corps (Thrace)
  - 1st Division, 2nd Division

=== Order of Battle, Late Summer 1915, January 1916 ===
In late Summer 1915, January 1916, the corps was structured as follows:

- I Corps (Gallipoli)
  - 2nd Division, 3rd Division

=== Order of Battle, August 1916 ===
In August 1916, the corps was structured as follows:

- I Corps (Gallipoli)
  - 14th Division, 16th Division

=== Order of Battle, December 1916 ===
In December 1916, the corps was structured as follows:

- I Corps (Thrace)
  - 14th Division, 16th Division

=== Order of Battle, August 1917, January 1918, June 1918, September 1918 ===
In August 1917, January 1918, June 1918, September 1918, the corps was structured as follows:

- I Corps (Thrace)
  - 42nd Division

== After Mudros ==
=== Order of Battle, November 1918 ===
In November 1918, the corps was structured as follows:

- I Corps (Thrace)
  - 55th Division

=== Order of Battle, January 1919 ===
In January 1919, the corps was structured as follows:

- I Corps (Thrace, Adrianople; present day Edirne)
  - 49th Division (Kırkkilise; present day Kırklareli)
    - 153rd Infantry Regiment, 154th Infantry Regiment, 155th Infantry Regiment, 185th Infantry Regiment
  - 60th Division (Malkara)
    - 186th Infantry Regiment, 187th Infantry Regiment
