= Hüseyin Hüsnü Pasha (born 1852) =

Ottoman admiral

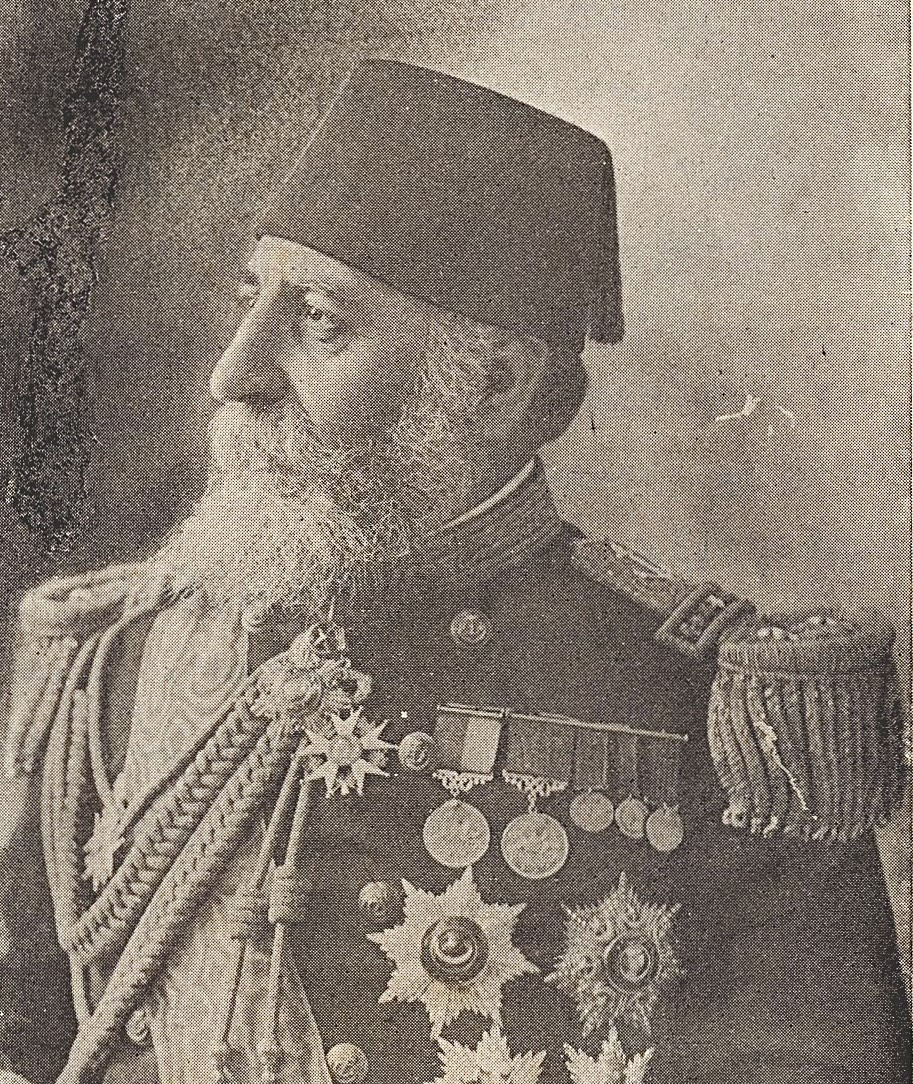
- Born: 1852
- Died: 1918 (aged 65–66)
- Military career
- Allegiance: Ottoman Empire
- Branch: Ottoman Navy
- Rank: Admiral
- Conflicts: Russo-Turkish War (1877–78)

Hüseyin Hüsnü Pasha (Modern Turkish: Hüseyin Hüsnü Paşa; 1852–1918) was an Ottoman admiral who participated in the Russo-Turkish War (1877–78). In 1909 he became the Minister of the Ottoman Navy (Bahriye Nazırı).
