= Ottoman railways =

Ottoman railways may refer to:

- Chemins de Fer Ottomans d'Anatolie an Ottoman railway company located in Central Anatolia of the Ottoman Empire.
- The Syria Ottoman Railway Company
- Baghdad Railway
- Hejaz railway
- Other railways of the Ottoman Empire

For a history of railways in the parts of the Ottoman Empire subsequently becoming the Republic of Turkey both before and after 1927 see History of rail transport in Turkey

For descendent railway systems see also:

- Rail transport in Turkey
- Rail transport in Syria
- Rail transport in Iraq
- Rail transport in Lebanon
- Rail transport in Israel
- Rail transport in Egypt
- Palestine Railways 1920-1948
