= Second Army (Ottoman Empire) =

- Active: 1873– 5 August – 18 November 1914; 5 December 1914-10 December 1918
- Country: Ottoman Empire
- Branch: Army
- Type: Field Army
- Size: Est.150.000
- Engagements: Russo-Turkish War (1877–1878): Caucasus Campaign (World War I); Battle of Bitlis; Battle of Muş; Persian campaign (World War I); Battle of Ushno

Commanders
- Notable commanders: Ahmed Muhtar Pasha (1873–1876) Vehib Pasha (November 1914 – February 1916); Ahmed Izzet Pasha (February 1916 – March 1917); Mustafa Kemal Pasha (March–July 1917); Fevzi Pasha (July-7 November 1917) Nihat Pasha (7 November 1917 – 4 February 1918)

The Second Army of the Ottoman Empire was one of the field armies of the Ottoman Army. It was formed in the late 19th century during the Ottoman military reforms in accordance with the Tanzimat period.

== Order of battle, 1877 ==
In 1877, it was stationed in what is now Bulgaria. It was composed of:

- 1st Infantry Division
- 2nd Infantry Division
- Cavalry Division
- field artillery regiment
- fortress artillery regiment

Upon mobilization for the Russo-Turkish War (1877–1878), the second army was split in two; these were named as Eastern Danube Army and Western Danube Army.

== Order of battle, 1908 ==
After the Young Turk Revolution and the establishment of the Second Constitutional Era on 3 July 1908, new government initiate a major military reform. Army headquarters were modernized. The army headquarter established in Adrianople. Its operational area was Thrace, the Dardanelles, and it had units in Europe and Asia Minor. It commanded the following active divisions: The Second Army also had inspectorate functions for six Redif or reserve divisions and one brigade:

- 2nd Army
  - 3rd Division, 4th Division, 20th Division, 21st Division
  - 2nd Cavalry Division
  - 2nd Artillery Division
  - Adrianople Fortress Artillery Regiment
- Redif of 2nd Army (name of the division denotes its location)
  - 35th Çanakkale Redif Division
  - 6th Bandırma Redif Division
  - 7th Afyonkarahisar Redif Division
  - 8th Konya Redif Division
  - 25th Adrianople Redif Division
  - 26th Kırcaali Redif Division
  - 53rd Kırk Kilise Redif Brigade

The Army also had 34 machine gun detachments.

== Order of battle, 1911 ==
With further reorganizations of the Ottoman Army, to include the creation of corps level headquarters, by 1911 the Army was headquartered in Salonika. It now had responsibility for the Balkans and operational control over forces in Syria and Palestine. The Army included two inspectorates, the Second in the Balkans and the Fifth in Syria. The Army at the start of the First Balkan War in 1912 was structured as such: (place names given are ones the Ottomans used at that time)

- Second Army Headquarters: Salonika
- V Corps, Salonika
  - 13th Infantry Division, Salonika
  - 14th Infantry Division, Serez
  - 15th Infantry Division, Usturumca
  - 6th Cavalry Brigade, Gevgili
- VI Corps, Monastir
  - 16th Infantry Division, İştip
  - 17th Infantry Division, Monastir
  - 18th Infantry Division, Debre
  - 7th Cavalry Brigade, Monastir
- VII Corps, Üsküp (Skopje)
  - 19th Infantry Division, Üsküp
  - 20th Infantry Division, Metroviçe
  - 21st Infantry Division, Yakova
  - 8th Cavalry Brigade, Üsküp
- Independent divisions:
  - 22nd Infantry Division, Kozana
  - 23rd Infantry Division, Yanya
  - 24th Infantry Division, İşkodra
- VIII Corps, Damascus, Syria
  - 25th Infantry Division, Dera
  - 26th Infantry Division, Aleppo
  - 27th Infantry Division, Beyrut
  - 9th Cavalry Brigade, Damascus

Additionally, the Second Redif Inspectorate had divisions in the Balkans at: Drama, Serez, Salonika, İştip, Monastir, Uskup, Piristine, Metroviçe, Pirzenin, Yanya, Elbasan, Naslic, and İşkodra. The Fifth Redif Inspectorate in Syria had divisions at: Adana, Antep, Aleppo, Damascus, Jerusalem, Akka, and Tripoli.

When the war started, the Second Army became the Western Army, the equivalent of an Army Group. The troops in Syria were prevented by the Greek Navy from reinforcing the forces in the Balkans.

After the war, the Second Army was reconstituted from those personnel who survived the destruction of the Western Army in the Balkans. It was first sent to Konya, and later to Syria.

== Order of battle, 1914 ==
At the outset of World War I, the army headquarters was located in Aleppo Syria commanding two corps made up of two divisions. The Redif system had been done away with, and the plan was to have reserve soldiers fill out active units rather than constitute separate units. The commander in October 1914 was General Vehip Pasha.

By November 1914, the Second Army was moved to Constantinople and commanded the V and VI Corps, each composed of three divisions. In February 1915 the defense of the Turkish Straits was reorganized. The Second Army had responsibility for the south and east coasts. It later provided troops to the fighting on the Gallipoli Peninsula but did not otherwise have a role.

Second Army

- VI Corps
  - 16th Division, 26th Division
- VIII Corps
  - 25th Division, 27th Division

=== Order of battle, April 1915 ===
Second Army

- V Corps
  - 13th Division, 14th Division, 15th Division
- VI Corps
  - 16th Division, 25th Division, 26th Division

The XVI. Corps, also known as the "Saros Group", was located north of the peninsula's neck to defend against a landing from the Gulf of Saros.

== Order of battle, 1916 ==
Mustafa Kemal established his post at Diyarbakır and took the command of the XVI^{th} Corps of the Ottoman 2nd Army

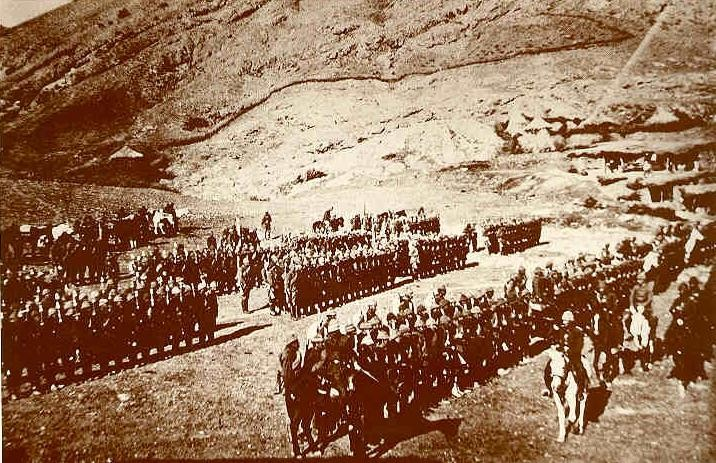
XVI Corps and Mustafa Kemal at Bitlis

In March 1916, the decision was made to deploy the Second Army to the Caucasus Campaign. The plan was to have the Second Army attack in conjunction with the Third Army. The Second Army was made up of veterans of the Gallipoli campaign as well as two new divisions. Due to the poor state of the Ottoman rail network, it took a long period of time to move the forces. In the meantime the Russians hit the Third Army, causing heavy casualties on that already battered army, preventing it from cooperating with the Second Army. The Second Army, commanded by Ahmet Izzet Pasha, finally attacked in August with the following divisions:

- III Corps
  - 1st Division, 7th Division, 14th Division, 53rd Division
- II Corps
  - 11th Division, 12th Division
- IV Corps
  - 47th Division, 48th Division
- V Corps
  - 9th Division, 10th Division, 13th Division
- XVI Corps, commanded by Mustafa Kemal Atatürk
  - 5th Division, 8th Division

Also assigned to the army was the 3rd Regular Cavalry Division.

While the XVI Corps commanded by Mustafa Kemal had success at Bitlis and Mus, the main attacks by the III and IV Corps suffered heavy losses. The Army lost about 30,000 out of 100,000 soldiers. The divisions suffering the losses were both veteran units and the best of the newly created divisions. The Ottoman Army could not afford to lose such men for meaningless gains. As a result, the offensive was a major strategic defeat. It was the last major strategic offensive by the Ottomans in the war.

In response to defeats elsewhere, the army had a number of divisions transferred to other areas such as Mesopotamia and Palestine. By December 1916, it was made up of six infantry divisions and one cavalry division. The army did not play a major role in the war after that.

== Order of battle, 1917 ==
In 1917, Mustafa Kemal was promoted to be the acting commander of the Second Army. His tenure was brief as he moved on to command the Seventh Army in Palestine. Nihat Anılmış commanded the army from November 1917. The army was deactivated in on 4 February 1918. It was later activated and commanded rear area troops including labor units in Anatolia. After the defeat at Megiddo, the army briefly saw front line service commanding three divisions (23rd, 41st, 44th) at the end of the war.
