= Yakup Şevki Subaşı =

General of the Turkish Army

Yakup Şevki Subaşı 1312-P. 5
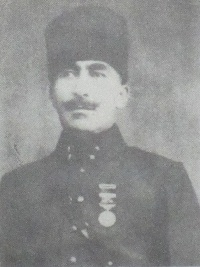
- Born: 1876; Harput, Ottoman Empire
- Died: 20 December 1939 (aged 62–63); Istanbul, Turkey
- Burial place: Karacaahmet Mezarlığı; State Cemetery
- Military career
- Allegiance: Ottoman Empire; Turkey
- Service years: Ottoman Empire: 1896–1920; Turkey: 1921–1926
- Rank: General
- Commands: Bosporus Fortified Area Command, 19th Division, III Corps (deputy), XV Corps (deputy), XV Corps, XIV Corps, II Caucasian Corps, Ninth Army; Second Army, member of the Supreme Military Council
- Conflicts: Balkan Wars; First World War; Turkish War of Independence

Yakup Şevki Subaşı (1876 in Harput – December 20, 1939 in Istanbul), also known as Yakub Shevki Pasha, was a general of the Ottoman Army and the Turkish Army. He participated in the Defense of Gallipoli during World War I and after the war, fought in the Turkish War of Independence.

== See also ==
- List of high-ranking commanders of the Turkish War of Independence
