= XXII Corps (Ottoman Empire) =

XXII Corps Yirmi İkinci Kolordu
- Active: 1916–September 1918
- Country: Ottoman Empire
- Type: Corps
- Engagements: Sinai and Palestine Campaign (World War I); Battle of Megiddo

Commanders
- Notable commanders: Miralay Friedrich Freiherr Kress von Kressenstein; Miralay Refet Bele

The XXII Corps of the Ottoman Empire (Turkish: 22 nci Kolordu or Yirmi İkinci Kolordu) was one of the corps of the Ottoman Army. It was formed during World War I.

== Order of Battle, August 1917 ==
In August 1917, the corps was structured as follows:

- XXII Corps (Palestine)
  - 3rd Division, 7th Division, 53rd Division

== Order of Battle, January 1918, June 1918 ==
In January and June 1918, the corps was structured as follows:

- XXII Corps (Palestine)
  - 3rd Division, 7th Division, 20th Division

== Order of Battle, September 1918 ==
In September 1918, the corps was structured as follows:

- XXII Corps (Palestine)
  - 7th Division, 20th Division
