= 1st Infantry Division (Ottoman Empire) =

Ottoman Military unit

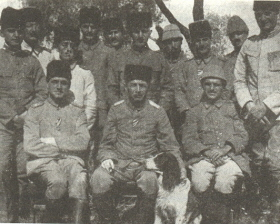
- Staff of the 1st Infantry Division
- Active: 1915 – 13 November 1918; 1923-late 1940s (Turkey)
- Country: Ottoman Empire
- Type: Infantry
- Engagements: World War I: Gallipoli Campaign; Caucasus Campaign; Sinai and Palestine Campaign

Commanders
- Notable commanders: Cafer Tayyar Eğilmez (1 December 1914 – 20 September 1916); Hans Guhr (1 October 1916 – 20 October 1918); Hulusi Bey (20 October 1918 – ? )

The 1st Infantry Division was among the Ottoman Army's several divisions formed during the period of the Great War.

== Formations ==
- Zığındere, Gallipoli; Commander: Cafer Tayyar, December 1914 – 10 January 1916, 1st Army – I Corps
  - 70th Infantry Regiment
  - 71st Infantry Regiment
  - 124th Infantry Regiment
- Göynük, Van; Commander: Hans Guhr, Assigned to 2nd Army – 3rd Corps
- Cifna, Palestine; Commander: Hans Guhr (Under 7th Army – 3rd Corps)
  - 70th Infantry Regiment
  - 71st Infantry Regiment
  - 124th Infantry Regiment
  - Five Batteries from the 1st Field Artillery Regiment
  - One Battery from the 1st Mountain Artillery Regiment
  - Four Companies from the 1st Engineer Battalion
  - One Troop from the 5th Cavalry Regiment
  - The 2nd Medical Company along with the 4th and 9th Field Hospitals
  - 6th Field Bakery Detachment
- Aleppo, Commander: Colonel Hulusi Bey, 20 October 1918, 7th Army – 3rd Corps
  - 70th Infantry Regiment
  - 109th Infantry Regiment
  - 111th Infantry Regiment

The descendant Turkish Army formation was active during the Second World War as part of First Army (Turkey) but then disbanded during the large-scale force reductions of 1947-49. It was then briefly reformed as part of 4th Corps in the early years of the 21st century.
