= Cafer Tayyar Eğilmez =

Turkish politician

Cafer Tayyar Eğilmez 1316-Sv. 4
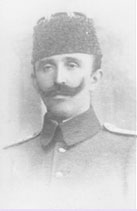
- Cafer Tayyar (Eğilmez)
- Born: 1877; Priştine (Pristina), Kosovo Vilayet, Ottoman Empire (modern Kosovo)
- Died: January 3, 1958 (aged 80–81); Istanbul, Turkey
- Burial place: Karacaahmet Mezarlığı
- Military career
- Allegiance: Ottoman Empire; Turkey
- Service years: Ottoman: 1901–1920; Turkey: 1920 – January 1928
- Rank: Mirliva
- Commands: 1st Division, II Corps, I Corps, II Corps, I Corps; Trakya Kuva-yi Milliye, VII Corps
- Conflicts: Balkan Wars; First World War; Turkish War of Independence
- Other work: Member of the GNAT (Edirne); Governor of the Samsun Province

Cafer Tayyar Eğilmez or Cafer Bey (1877 – January 3, 1958) was an officer of the Ottoman Army and a general of the Turkish Army. He participated in the Defense of Gallipoli during World War I and after the war had ended, he joined the forces of Mustafa Kemal Pasha and fought in the Turkish War of Independence.

On 12 August 1923 he was appointed commander of the 7th Corps. He was promoted to Mirliva and made a Pasha on 24 Eylül 1923. He put down the Assyrian rebellion in south-eastern Anatolia.

== See also ==
- List of high-ranking commanders of the Turkish War of Independence

== External lınks ==
- Zülal Keleş, "Cafer Tayyar Paşa", Atatürk Araştırma Merkezi Dergisi, Sayı 44, Cilt: XV, Temmuz 1999. (in Turkish)
