= XVII Corps (Ottoman Empire) =

XVII Corps On Yedinci Kolordu
- Active: 1915–
- Country: Ottoman Empire
- Type: Corps
- Garrison/HQ: Smyrna (İzmir)
- Patron: Sultans of the Ottoman Empire
- Engagements: Occupation of Smyrna

Commanders
- Notable commanders: Miralay Selâhattin Âdil Bey (December 17, 1917-November 27, 1917); Mirliva Nurettin Pasha (November–December 30, 1918); Miralay Selâhattin Âdil Bey (December 30, 1918-January 2, 1919); Mirliva Nureddin Pasha (January 2-March 22, 1919); Ali Nadir Pasha (March 22-May 20, 1919)

The XVII Corps of the Ottoman Empire (Turkish: 17 nci Kolordu or On Yedinci Kolordu) was one of the corps of the Ottoman Army. It was formed during World War I.

== Balkan Wars ==
=== Order of Battle, October 17, 1912 ===
On October 17, 1912, the corps was structured as follows:

- XVII Provisional Corps (Thrace, under the command of the Eastern Army)
  - Samsun Redif Division, Eregli Redif Division, Smyrna Redif Division

=== Order of Battle, October 29, 1912 ===
On October 29, 1912, the corps was structured as follows:

- XVII Provisional Corps (Thrace, under the command of the Second Eastern Army)
  - Samsun Redif Division, Eregli Redif Division, Trabzon Redif Division

On November 7, 1912, the XVII Provisional Corps was inactivated.

== World War I ==
=== Order of Battle, 1915 ===
- XVII Corps (Gallipoli)
  - 15th Division, 25th Division

=== Order of Battle, 1917 ===
- XVII Corps (Smyrna)
  - None

== After Mudros ==
=== Order of Battle, November 1918 ===
In November 1918, the corps was structured as follows:

- XVII Corps (Smyrna; present day: İzmir)
  - 58th Division

=== Order of Battle, January 1919 ===
In January 1919, the corps was structured as follows:

- XVII Corps (Smyrna, Commander: Nureddin Pasha)
  - 56th Division (Smyrna)
    - 172nd Infantry Regiment, 173rd Infantry Regiment, 174th Infantry Regiment
  - 57th Division (Aydın)
    - 135th Infantry Regiment, 175th Infantry Regiment, 176th Infantry Regiment

=== Order of Battle, May 15, 1919 ===
On May 15, 1919, the corps was structured as follows:

- XVII Corps (Smyrna, Commander: Ali Nadir Pasha)
  - 56th Division (Smyrna, Commander: Hürrem Bey)
    - 172nd Infantry Regiment (Ayvalık, Commander: Ali Bey)
    - 173rd Infantry Regiment (Urla, Commander: Kâzım Bey)
    - 174th Infantry Regiment (Smyrna)
  - 57th Division (Aydın, Commander: Şefik Bey)
    - 135th Infantry Regiment, 175th Infantry Regiment, 176th Infantry Regiment
