= 25th Infantry Division (Ottoman Empire) =

The 25th Division was a formation of the VIII Corps of the Ottoman Army based in Damascus. It had been intended that its manpower would be raised from locally recruited Syrians and Arabs.

The division was composed of the 25th Artillery Regiment, and three infantry regiments the 73rd, 74th and 75th.
