= 2nd Infantry Division (Ottoman Empire) =

The 2nd Infantry Division was a formation of the Ottoman Turkish Army, during the Balkan Wars, and the First World War.

== Formation ==
1st Infantry Regiment
5th Infantry Regiment
6th Infantry Regiment
