= 16th Infantry Division (Ottoman Empire) =

The 16th Infantry Division was a formation of the Ottoman Turkish Army during the Balkan Wars and the First World War.

== Formation ==
33rd Infantry Regiment
47th Infantry Regiment
48th Infantry Regiment
125th Infantry Regiment
