= Capture of Jericho =

Event in World War I

- Part of the Middle Eastern theatre of World War I
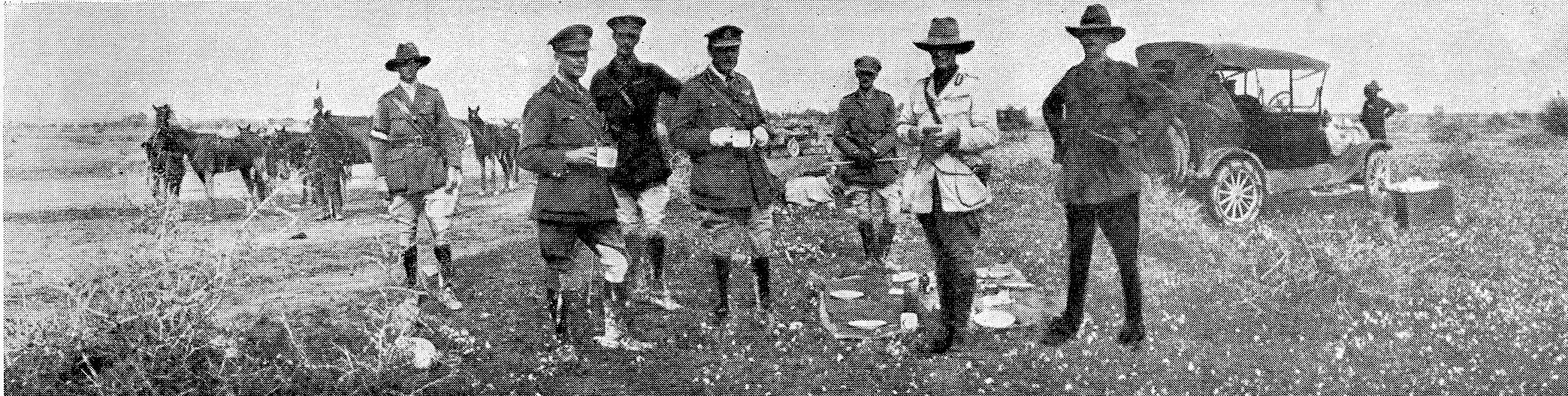
- Breakfast meeting of Generals Chaytor, Chauvel and Chetwode on the morning of the capture of Jericho, 21 February 1918
Date	19–21 February 1918
Location	East of Jerusalem to Jericho in the Jordan Valley
Result	Egyptian Expeditionary Force victory

Belligerents
British Empire: United Kingdom of Great Britain and Ireland; Australia; New Zealand	Ottoman Empire

Commanders and leaders
(United Kingdom of Great Britain and Ireland) Edmund Allenby (United Kingdom of Great Britain and Ireland) Philip Chetwode (United Kingdom of Great Britain and Ireland) John Shea (Dominion of New Zealand) Edward Chaytor	(German Empire) Otto Liman von Sanders (Ottoman Empire) Djemal Pasha (Ottoman Empire) Ali Fuad Bey (Ottoman Empire) Refet Bey

Units involved
Egyptian Expeditionary Force; XX Corps: 60th (London) Division; 53rd (Welsh) Division; and Desert Mounted Corps's: 1st Light Horse Brigade; New Zealand Mounted Rifles Brigade	Yildirim Army Group; Seventh Army; XX Corps: 26th Division; 53rd Division

Strength
6,800	3,000

Casualties and losses
510	144 prisoners, 8 machine guns

The Capture of Jericho occurred between 19 and 21 February 1918 to the east of Jerusalem beginning the Occupation of the Jordan Valley during the Sinai and Palestine Campaign of the First World War. Fighting took place in an area bordered by the Bethlehem–Nablus road in the west, the Jordan River in the east, and north of a line from Jerusalem to the Dead Sea. Here a British Empire force attacked Ottoman positions, forcing them back to Jericho and eventually across the Jordan River.

Winter rains put an end to campaigning after the advance from the Gaza–Beersheba line to the capture of Jerusalem in December 1917. This lull in the fighting offered the opportunity for the captured territories to be consolidated. Extensive developments were also required along the lines of communication to ensure that front-line troops were adequately supplied, approximately 150 miles (240 km) from their main bases at Moascar and Kantara on the Suez Canal.

General Edmund Allenby's initial strategic plans focused on his open right flank. If attacked with sufficiently large forces, he could be outflanked by an attack from the east—unlike his left flank which rested securely on the Mediterranean Sea to the west. His aim was to capture the territory east of Jerusalem stretching to the Dead Sea, where his right flank could be more secure. The area was garrisoned by Ottoman troops entrenched on hill-tops which the British infantry, Australian light horse and New Zealand Mounted Rifles Brigades attacked. The infantry captured Talat ed Dumm on the main Jerusalem to Jericho road, while the light horse and mounted rifle brigades captured Jericho and the area to the south bordered by the Jordan River and the Dead Sea.

== Background ==
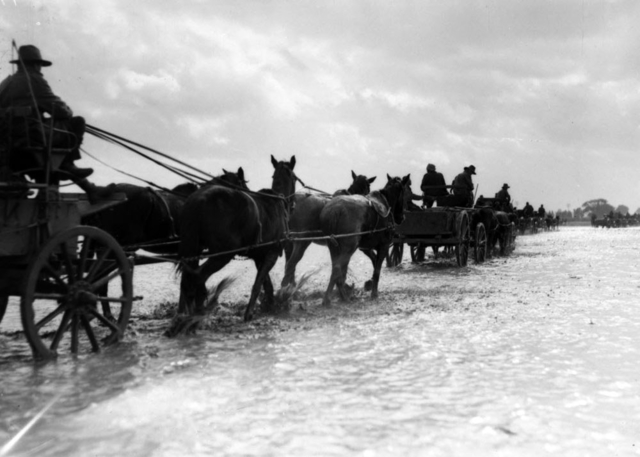
Wagons of the 1st Australian Light Horse going through the flood waters at Esdud to collect their rations on 7 January 1918. Photographer Frank Hurley

The advance from Beersheba came to a halt in December. On 14 December Allenby reported to the War Cabinet that the rainy season would prevent any further operations, after Jerusalem was secured, for at least two months. At this time, the Egyptian Expeditionary Force was paralysed by a breakdown in logistics forcing Allenby to send the Anzac and the Australian Mounted Divisions, along with the Imperial Camel Corps Brigade south of Gaza to shorten their lines of communication. He wrote: "I can't feed them, with certainty, and even now, a fortnight's heavy rain would bring me near starvation." On 1 January, the 5th Mounted Brigade began moving back through the rain and slush followed by the 4th Light Horse Brigades Field Ambulance, beginning the Australian Mounted Division's journey back to Deir el Belah south of Gaza. The Anzac Mounted Division did not move back quite so far; the 1st and possibly 2nd Light Horse Brigades moved back to Esdud while the New Zealand Mounted Rifles Brigade bivouacked near Ayun Kara (also known as Rishon LeZion) not far from Jaffa.

Allenby wrote on 25 January: "I want to extend my right, to include Jericho and the N[orth] of the Dead Sea." This advance would remove the more serious threat to his right by pushing all the enemy across the Jordan River and securing the Jordan River crossings. It would also prevent raids into the country to the west of the Dead Sea and provide a narrow starting point for operations against the Hedjaz Railway.

General Jan Christiaan Smuts, a member of the Imperial War Cabinet, was sent to confer with Allenby regarding the implementation of a French qualification to the War Office's Joint Note No. 12—that no troops from France could be redeployed to the Egyptian Expeditionary Force. Smuts was on his way back to London in February when the first step was taken to accomplish his suggestion of crossing the Jordan River and capturing the Hedjaz Railway, and the front line was extended eastwards with the successful capture of Jericho.

== Prelude ==
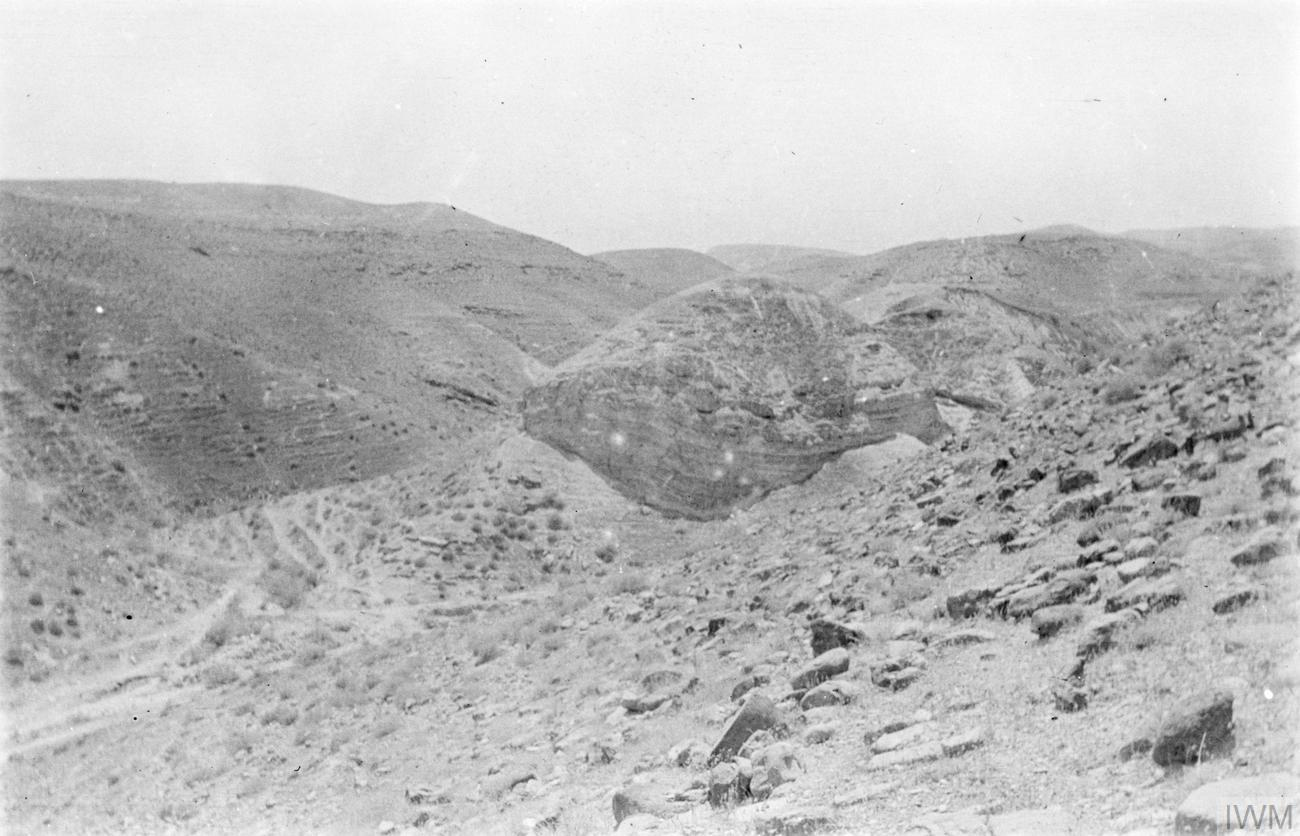
Blue Mountains between Jerusalem and the Jordan Valley

The country on the eastern side of the Judean Hills falls into the Jordan Valley in a confused mass of rocky ridges and deep narrow valleys. All the main wadis run from west to east; often with steep high banks, while the tributaries joined from all directions, breaking up the ridges making the hills, almost impossible to cross. Most tracks ran along the narrow beds of ravines where progress had to be made in single file. Further north at Jebel Kuruntul (also known as Jebel Quruntul, the Mount of Temptation and Mount Quarantania) the mountains end abruptly in a 1,000-foot (300 m) cliff. Sometimes the attacking parties had to haul themselves and each other over abrupt cliffs to be in a position to fight at close quarters at the top. Yet, in early Spring, the area was covered by wild flowers including cyclamen, anemones, poppies and tulips.

=== Defending force ===
Three Ottoman armies were deployed to defend their front line: the Eighth Army (headquartered at Tul Keram) defended the Mediterranean section, the Seventh Army (headquartered at Nablus) defended the Judean Hills sector, and the Fourth Army (headquartered at Amman) defended the eastern Transjordan section of the line. Between 3,000 and 5,000 Ottoman troops from the 26th and 53rd Infantry Divisions XX Corps defended the area on the western edge of the Jordan Valley. They garrisoned a series of hill-tops from Tubk el Kaneiterah, near the Dead Sea, through Talat ed Dumm to the Wadi Fara. Here the XX Corps was entrenched at Ras um Deisis and El Muntar Iraq Ibrahim astride the Jericho road. There was also at least one regiment in the Jordan Valley near the Wadi el Auja.

=== Mounted and infantry attacking force ===
By February, logistics had sufficiently developed to support the advance towards Jericho, and Allenby ordered Lieutenant General Philip Chetwode to capture Jericho as soon as the weather cleared. While the remainder of the Egyptian Expeditionary Force held the front line and garrisoned the captured territories in southern Palestine, Chetwode's XX Corps the 60th (2/2nd London) Division was to make the attack towards Jericho, supported by his 53rd (Welsh) Division and one infantry brigade from the 74th (Yeomanry) Division on the left. They were to move towards the Wadi el Auja, which flowed eastwards into the Jordan River (not to be confused with the Wadi el Auja which flowed westwards into the Mediterranean Sea from the same watershed). At the same time, Chauvel's Desert Mounted Corps, mounted force formed by the 1st Light Horse Brigade and the New Zealand Mounted Rifles Brigade (both brigades from the Anzac Mounted Division), was to cover the right flank of Chetwode's infantry and advance towards Rujm el Bahr on the Dead Sea. (Note: The 2nd Light Horse Brigade remained on the maritime plain, near the Mediterranean Sea, holding a portion of the front line. [Powles 1922 p. 173])

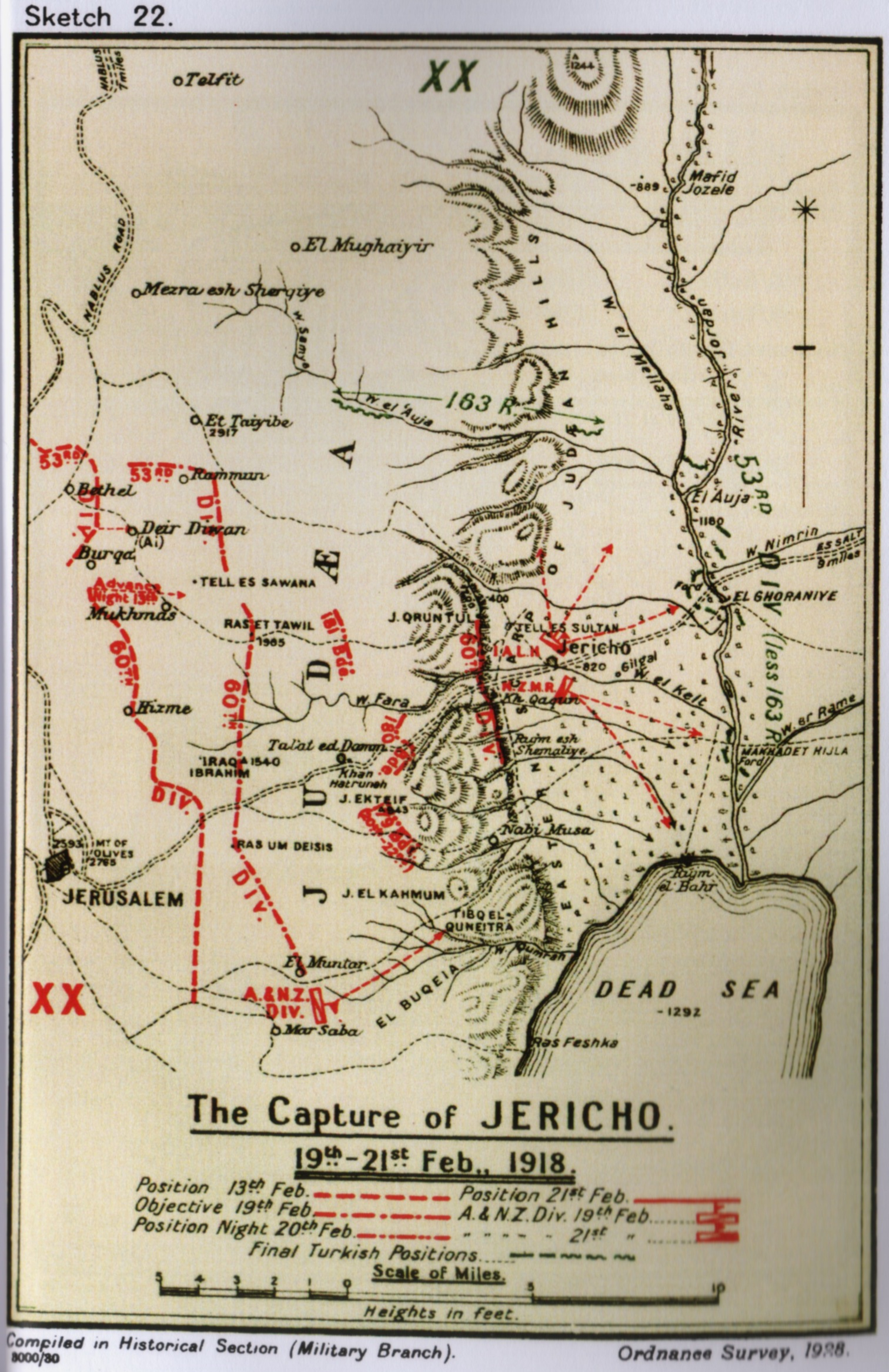
Falls Sketch Map 22 shows the movements of the infantry from 13 to 21 February 1918 and mounted patrols in the Jordan Valley on 21 February

The plan was for the 60th (London) Division to advance to Mukhmas eight miles (13 km) north-north-east of Jerusalem, then advance forward six miles (9.7 km) east through El Muntar Iraq Ibrahim and Ras et Tawil. Their left flank was to be covered the 53rd (Welsh) Division, which was to capture the high ground at Rammun three miles (4.8 km) north of Mukhmas while their right was covered by the Anzac Mounted Division. The second stage required the 60th (London) Division to advance to a point yet to be decided, in three brigade columns: the right to Jebil Ekteif south of the main Jericho road, the centre to Talat ed Dumm, and the left column moving along the "Ancient Road" running east from Mukhmas. Their final advance would take them to the edge of the ridge overlooking Jericho and the Jordan Valley; there was no plan for them to enter the valley. Each infantry column was to be supported by a 60-pounder or 6-inch artillery battery, a Field artillery brigade and a field company of Royal Engineers.

On 14 February, preliminary operations were carried out by the XX Corps; the 60th (London) Division which advanced to Mukhmas eight miles (13 km) north-north-east of Jerusalem, while on their left flank the 53rd (Welsh) Division captured the village of Deir Diwan. At this time the 1st Light Horse and New Zealand Mounted Rifles Brigades were at Ayun Kara; they marched out for Bethlehem arriving there on 17 and 18 February. While the infantry attacks were progressing along the road between Jerusalem and Jericho on 19 February, the two brigades of the Anzac Mounted Division were to move in a flanking movement towards Nebi Musa. They were to make their way down into the Jordan Valley towards Rujm el Bahr to cut off enemy retreat from Jericho, and drive the remaining Ottoman defenders to the eastern side of the Jordan River.

=== Air support ===
On 3 January, two Australian aircraft discovered boats carrying corn and hay moving from Ghor el Hadit (behind Point Costigan) and Rujm el Bahr at the northern end of the Dead Sea. These were bombed and sprayed with bullets repeatedly until the boat service stopped.

On 10 January, as part of the preparations for the attack on Jericho, six aircraft dropped 48 bombs on Amman and Kissir, a Hedjaz railway station six miles (9.7 km) to the south, resulting in several direct hits on rolling stock, station buildings and troops. Aircraft patrols were then directed to fly over Jericho and Shunet Nimrin on the western and eastern sectors of the Jordan Valley on alternate days. These patrols closely watched and reported tactical details, including the number of tents and camps, the state of supply dumps, the conditions of roads and tracks, and traffic on the railway.

== Battle ==
=== Infantry attack on 19 February ===
The 60th (London) Division advanced with their 180th Brigade in the centre, their 181st Brigade on the left, and their 179th Brigade with the Wellington Mounted Rifle Regiment covering their right flank. At Ras et Tawil, the 2/23rd Battalion, London Regiment (181st Brigade) suffered 50 casualties in attacking some 300 entrenched Ottomans, capturing 25 prisoners and two machine guns; the Ottomans abandoned their position soon after. To the north-east of El Muntar Iraq Ibrahim, during a further advance by the 2/20th Battalion, London Regiment along a narrow ridge on the south bank of the Wadi Fara, they captured the high ground suffering 66 casualties. Meanwhile, on the left flank of the 60th (London) Division, the 160th Brigade of the 53rd (Welsh) Division captured Rammun, where the 2/10th Battalion Middlesex Regiment had some hard fighting, and the heights to the south. The Wellington Mounted Rifles Regiment moved from Bethlehem to the Greek monastery of Mar Saba and onto the El Buqeia plateau, where Ottoman forces were entrenched astride the Mar Saba to Jericho road south of Nebi Musa. The remainder of the 1st Light Horse and New Zealand Mounted Rifles Brigades moved from Bethlehem towards El Muntar.

Chetwode and Chauvel watched these operations begin from the Mount of Olives more than 2,000 feet (610 m) above sea level; by the time the light horse and mounted rifles brigades reached Jericho on 21 February they were nearly 1,200 feet (370 m) below sea level.

=== 20 February ===
==== Infantry attack ====
The three infantry columns advanced: the column in the centre, the 180th Brigade, captured their objective of Talat ed Dumm on the main road from Jerusalem to Jericho. This infantry brigade moved along the Jerusalem to Jericho road towards Talat ed Dumm; they were supported by the 10th Heavy Battery and one 6-inch Howitzer of the 383rd Siege Battery. The village was captured after an hour's bombardment. On the left, the 181st Brigade was slowed in their advance by small rearguards which showed skills in manoeuvre. The brigade was only able to advance 2.5 miles (4.0 km) to be about halfway between Ras et Tawil and Jebel Qruntul (also known as Jebel Kuruntul, the Mount of Temptation and Mount Quarantania) by nightfall, with the 231st Brigade of the 74th (Yeomanry) Division forming a reserve.

On the right, the 179th Brigade column marched towards Jebel Ekteif (to the south of Talat ed Dumm); their 2/13th Battalion, London Regiment, however, faced a sheer drop of over twenty feet (6.1 m) and had to proceed across intervening ridges into parallel wadis, arriving too late for the attack. Meanwhile, two companies of the 2/16th Battalion, London Regiment from the 179th Brigade, of the 60th (London) Division were ordered to support an attack on Jebel Ekteif by the 2/15th Battalion, London Regiment. By 08:15 they had captured the advanced trenches, three companies, and fought their way up into the firing line on the summit of the hill. At 10:00 the British infantry were reported to have captured this dominating position on the Jerusalem–Jericho road, but a strong counter-attack drove them off. Jebel Ektief was finally captured at about 12:30 when heavy artillery helped the desperate attackers secure their objective. (Note: Falls states it was captured at 11:25. [Falls 1930 Vol. 2 Part II p. 307])

==== Mounted attack ====
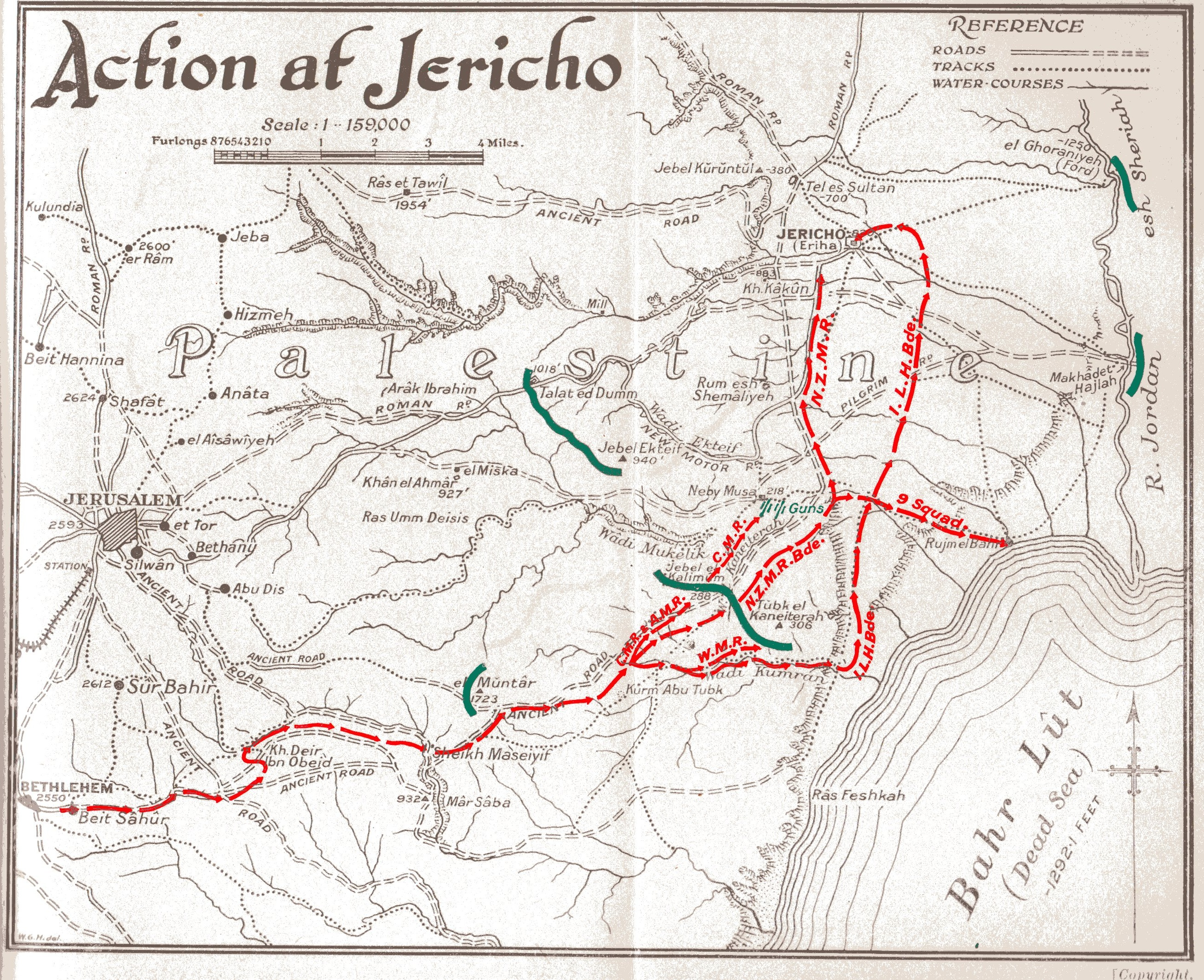
Map showing the advance of the Anzac Mounted Division with Ottoman positions indicated in green

Meanwhile, the New Zealand Mounted Rifles Brigade (with the Wellington Mounted Rifles Regiment which had returned from the 179th Brigade) led the 1st Light Horse Brigade at 03:30 in their advanced on El Muntar. The advance guard formed by the Wellington Mounted Rifles Regiment moved from Bethlehem along an ancient road down the Wadi en Nar to the valley near El Muntar hill, followed by their brigade and the 1st Light Horse Brigade. They zig-zagged three miles (4.8 km) down to the valley floor while Ottoman soldiers on the height of El Muntar 1,250 feet (380 m) above watched their approach. Because of the terrain they moved in single file: the New Zealand Mounted Rifles Brigade was strung out from five to eight miles (8.0–13 km), and it was hours before the long column could deploy for the attack.

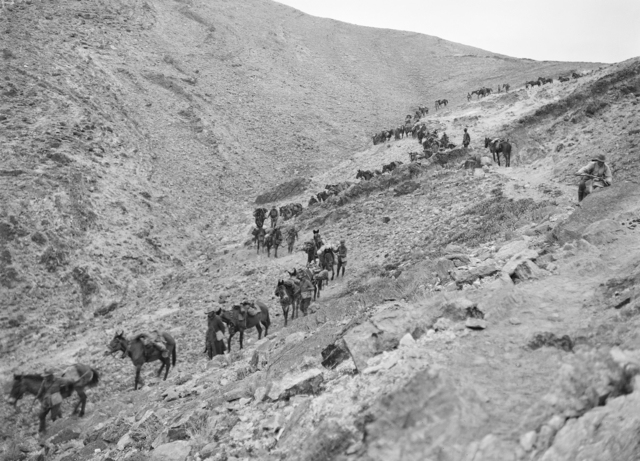
Frank Hurley's photograph of the 1st Light Horse Brigade zig-zagging down a barren hillside

By 06:00 all the New Zealand Mounted Rifles Brigade was in the valley; the Wellington Mounted Rifles Regiment was attacking Hill 306 while the Canterbury and Auckland Mounted Rifles Regiments attacked Hill 288. Shortly after 12:00 a mounted advance by an Auckland squadron took Hill 288, and Hill 306 was captured soon after. They attacked Ottoman positions from Tibq el Quneitra to Jebel el Kahmum astride the Mar Saba–Jericho road. These were both occupied soon after 14:00, forcing the Ottoman defenders to fall back to Nebi Musa. But Nebi Musa was strongly held by entrenched Ottoman soldiers supported by artillery, which made it impossible to move on: the attack was postponed until the next day.

Even in daylight I should not have dreamt of riding this track [down the Wadi Qumran to the valley of the Jordan], and yet the whole brigade passed along it without mishap. At 11.00pm we were at the arranged position, and after tethering out the horses rolled ourselves up in our blankets. The night was bitterly cold, and we missed our "bivvies", orders having been given to travel light, so that every man rode with an absolute minimum weight. We are to leave here at 3.30 am to attack Neby Musa.

— Frank Hurley, the Official Australian War Photographer, attached to the 1st Light Horse Brigade

Meanwhile, at dusk, the 1st Light Horse Brigade began its descent. They moved down the Wadi Qumran to the Jordan Valley, following a goat track which fell 1,300 feet (400 m) in two miles (3.2 km) to get into position to attack Nebi Musa from the rear. This journey was successfully completed by midnight.

=== 21 February ===
Under cover of darkness, the New Zealand Mounted Rifles Brigade advanced north along a very rough track and by daylight had reached just east of the Neby Musa position. They made a dismounted attack while British infantry attacked Neby Musa from the rear. The Canterbury Mounted Rifles Regiment occupied Neby Musa at daylight after crossing the gorge on foot to find the Ottoman garrison had withdrawn with their guns.

When the 1st Light Horse Brigade reached the floor of the Jordan Valley near the Dead Sea, 1,300 feet (400 m) below sea level, it turned north towards Jericho. A single troop of 3rd Light Horse Regiment entered Jericho at about 08:00 to find the Ottoman garrison had withdrawn. The remainder of the brigade advanced up the Jordan Valley as far as the Wadi el Auja, while the Wellington Mounted Rifles Regiment (New Zealand Mounted Rifles Brigade) occupied Rujm el Bahr on the north shore of the Dead Sea. Meanwhile, the 60th (London) Division moved to the top of the cliff overlooking Jericho and the Jordan Valley from Neby Musa to Jebel Qruntul.

Divisional Headquarters Staff set up their report centre about one mile (1.6 km) behind Jericho; when they were sitting down to a morning cup of tea, Chetwode and Chauvel joined them. Chaytor was sitting on the step of his car when shells fired from the other side of the Jordan River started to explode. One hit the front of his car and he narrowly escaped injury. This gun continued shelling the area at a range of over 10,000 yards (9,100 m); the British 13-pounders could get no further than 6,000 yards (5,500 m). Chetwode's force of infantry and mounted units suffered 510 casualties during these operations.

=== Air support ===
During these three days of operations No. 1 Squadron's aircraft completely dominated all enemy aircraft, bombing and machine-gunning Ottoman positions, and reporting to headquarters on progress and estimates of Ottoman dispositions and strength. Messages were also dropped on troops in the front line with urgent news. Considerable Ottoman reinforcements were seen to arrive at Shunet Nimrin on the eastern side of the Jordan River, and an aerial raiding formation from No. 1 Squadron bombed troop tents, marquees and a supply dump in the area.

== Aftermath ==
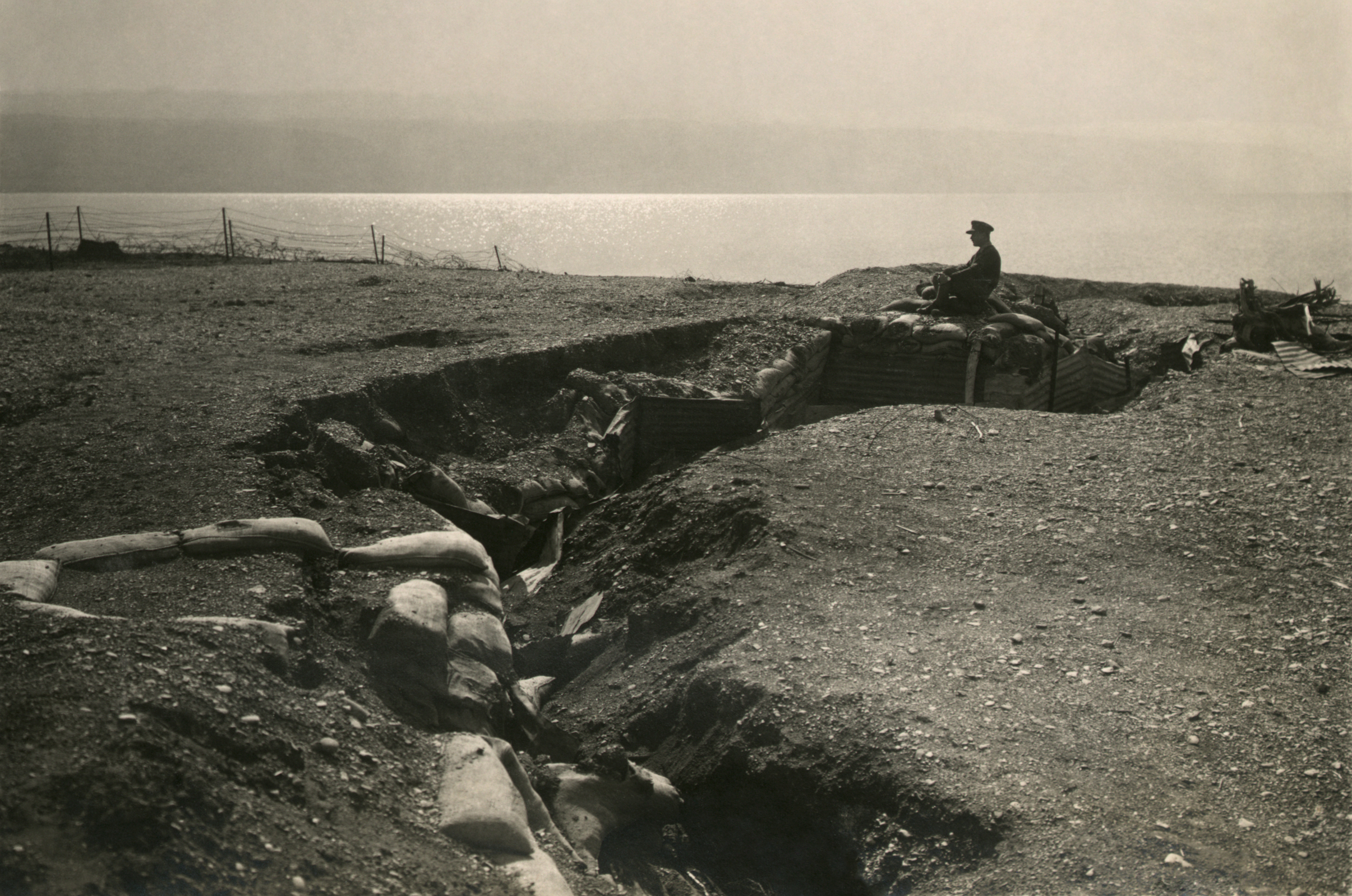
Ottoman trenches on the shore of the Dead Sea

On 22 February the 60th (London) Division withdrew its main line to Jebel Ekteif – Talat ed Dumm – Ras et Tawil, leaving outposts on the cliffs above the Jordan Valley and the Anzac Mounted Division started their journey back to Richon LeZion via Bethlehem. The Anzac Mounted Division left behind in the Jordan Valley the Auckland Mounted Rifles Regiment with a subsection of machine guns and an artillery battery (under orders of the 60th Division) in a strong position where the road from Jerusalem falls into the Jordan Valley.

Ottoman troops on the western bank of the Jordan River were holding a strong bridgehead at Ghoraniyeh, protecting the old stone bridge on the main Jerusalem to Es Salt road. There was also a smaller detachment down stream, covering the ford at Makhadet Hijlah (the traditional site of Christ's baptism).

The Auckland Mounted Rifle Regiment patrolled the Jordan River and valley area under enemy observation, attracting artillery shelling from Ottoman field guns. The patrols monitored the Ottoman positions at Ghoraniyeh and Makhadet Hajlah ("Partridge Ford"; cf. Deir Hijla) until 25 February when all Ottoman troops, guns and a pontoon bridge were found to have been removed to the east bank of the river. At the same time Shunet Nimrin was rapidly entrenched by the Ottoman Seventh Army and was soon held in force.

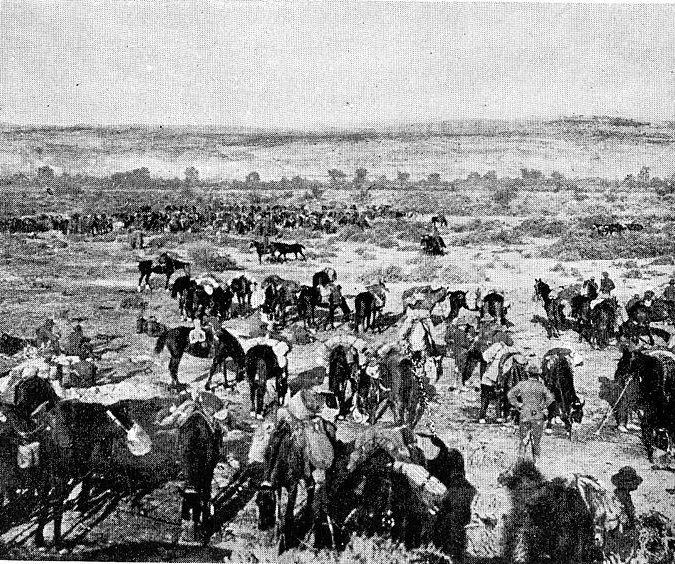
A halt in the Jordan Valley

Ottoman army garrisons continued to hold the Hedjaz railway from Deraa to Medina (although the line was harassed and cut by insurgent Arab units) and Cemal's VIII and XII Corps guarded the northern Levantine coast with four infantry divisions. The Ottoman Empire's War Minister, Enver Pasa, had lost confidence in the commander of the Ottoman forces in Palestine, German General von Falkenhayn, and on 1 March 1918 replaced him with General Otto Liman von Sanders.

On 6 March the War Cabinet gave Allenby leave to advance "to the maximum extent possible, consistent with the safety of the force under his orders". He decided to create a third infantry corps called the XXII, commanded by Barrow with Wavell as his chief of staff. (Note: This corps was not formed because the Spring Offensive had drained Allenby's force.) On 21 March an attempt to cut the Hedjaz railway at Amman began; this coincided with the launch of the German spring offensive by Ludendorff against the Allies on the Western Front. (Note: Bruce claims that although the occupation of Jericho protected Jerusalem from Ottoman attack from the east, it did not provide the hoped-for secure base to mount operations on the Hedjaz railway. [Bruce 2002, p. 188])

== Notes ==
Footnotes

Citations
