= Fourth Army (Ottoman Empire) =

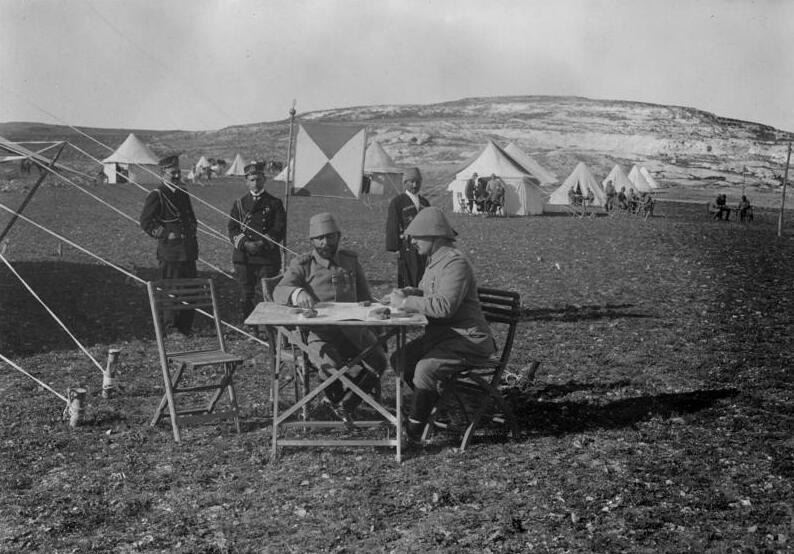
- Djemal Pasha and Fuad Bey (April 1917)
- Active: ?-? 7 September 1914 – 26 September 1918
- Country: Ottoman Empire
- Type: Field Army
- Garrison/HQ: Baghdad, Damascus
- Patron: Sultans of the Ottoman Empire
- Engagements: Sinai and Palestine Campaign (World War I)

Commanders
- Notable commanders: Zeki Pasha (September – 18 November 1914); Djemal Pasha (18 November 1914 – September 1917); Mersinli Djemal Pasha (September 1917 – October 1918)

The Fourth Army of the Ottoman Empire (Turkish: Dördüncü Ordu) was one of the field armies of the Ottoman Army. It was formed in the middle nineteenth century, during Ottoman military reforms.

The army did not survive the WWI battles in Palestine and Syria.

== Formations ==
=== Order of Battle, 1877 ===
In 1877, it was stationed in Anatolia. It was composed of:

- Infantry: Five line regiments and six rifle battalions
- Cavalry: Three line regiments
- Artillery: One line regiment (12 batteries)
- Engineer: One sapper company

=== Order of Battle, 1908 ===
After the Young Turk Revolution and the establishment of the Second Constitutional Era on 3 July 1908, the new government initiated a major military reform. Army headquarters were modernized. The Fourth Army's new operational area was Caucasia and its many troops were scattered along the frontier to keep an eye on the Russian Empire. It commanded the following active divisions and other units:

- 7th Infantry Division (Yedinci Fırka)
- 8th Infantry Division (Sekicinci Fırka)
- 19th Infantry Division (On Dokuzuncu Fırka)
- 4th Artillery Division (Dördüncü Topçu Fırkası)
- Erzurum Fortress Artillery Regiment

The Fourth Army also had inspectorate functions for four Redif (reserve) divisions:

- 13th Erzincan Reserve Infantry Division (On Üçüncü Erzincan Redif Fırkası)
- 14th Trabzon Reserve Infantry Division (On Dördüncü Trabzon Redif Fırkası)
- 15th Diyarbekir Reserve Infantry Division (On Beşinci Diyarbekir Redif Fırkası)
- 16th Sivas Reserve Infantry Division (On Altıncı Sivas Redif Fırkası)

=== Order of Battle, 1911 ===
With further reorganizations of the Ottoman Army, to include the creation of corps level headquarters, by 1911 the Army's headquarters were Baghdad. Before the First Balkan War in 1911, the Army was structured as:

- Army Headquarters, Baghdad
  - XII Corps, Musul
    - 35th Infantry Division, Musul
    - 36th Infantry Division, Kerkük
  - XIII Corps, Baghdad
    - 37th Infantry Division, Baghdad
    - 38th Infantry Division, Basra

== World War I ==
=== Order of Battle, November 1914 ===
In November 1914, the army was structured as:

- Fourth Army (Syria)
  - VIII Corps
    - 23rd Division
    - 25th Division
    - 27th Division
  - XII Corps
    - 35th Division
    - 36th Division

=== Order of Battle, Late April 1915 ===
In April 1915, the army was structured as:

- Fourth Army (Syria)
  - VIII Corps
    - 8th Division
    - 10th Division
    - 23rd Division
    - 25th Division
    - 27th Division
  - XII Corps
    - 35th Division
    - 36th Division

=== Order of Battle, Late Summer 1915, January 1916 ===
In late Summer 1915, January 1916, the army was structured as:

- Fourth Army (Syria-Palestine)
  - VIII Corps
    - 23rd Division
    - 24th Division
    - 27th Division
  - XII Corps
    - 41st Division
    - 42nd Division
    - 46th Division

=== Order of Battle, August, December 1916 ===
Between August and December 1916, the army was structured as:

- Fourth Army (Syria-Palestine)
  - VIII Corps
    - 3rd Division
    - 23rd Division
    - 24th Division
    - 27th Division
  - XII Corps
    - 41st Division
    - 42nd Division
    - 43rd Division
    - 46th Division

=== Order of Battle, August 1917 ===
In August 1917, the army was structured as:

- Fourth Army (Syria-Palestine)
    - 3rd Cavalry Division
  - VIII Corps
    - 48th Division
  - XII Corps
    - 23rd Division
    - 44th Division
  - XV Corps
    - 43rd Division
  - XX Corps
    - 16th Division
    - 54th Division
  - XXII Corps
    - 3rd Division
    - 7th Division
    - 53rd Division

On 26 September the Fourth Army headquarters moved to Damascus, dividing its area of responsibility in half, leaving Cemal Pasha answerable for Syria and western Arabia.

=== Order of Battle, January, June 1918 ===
Between January and June 1918, the army was structured as follows:

- Fourth Army (commanded by Jemal) (Syria-West Arabia)
  - VIII Corps (commanded by Ali Fuad Bey)
    - 43rd Division
    - 48th Division
  - XII Corps
    - 23rd Division
    - 41st Division
    - 44th Division
  - Hejaz Corps
    - 58th Division
    - Provisional Infantry Divisions x 3

=== Order of Battle, September 1918 ===
In September 1918, the army was structured as:

- Fourth Army (Mirliva Mersinli Cemal Pasha)
  - II Corps (Miralay Galatalı Şevket Bey)
    - 62nd Division
    - Provisional Divisions x 3
  - Jordan Group
    - 24th Division
    - 3rd Cavalry Division
  - VIII Corps (Miralay Yasin Hilmi Bey)
    - 48th Division
    - Umman Provisional Division
