= First Battle of the Jordan =

Battle fought during WWI

Coordinates: 31°56′N 35°56′E

- Part of the Middle Eastern theatre of World War I
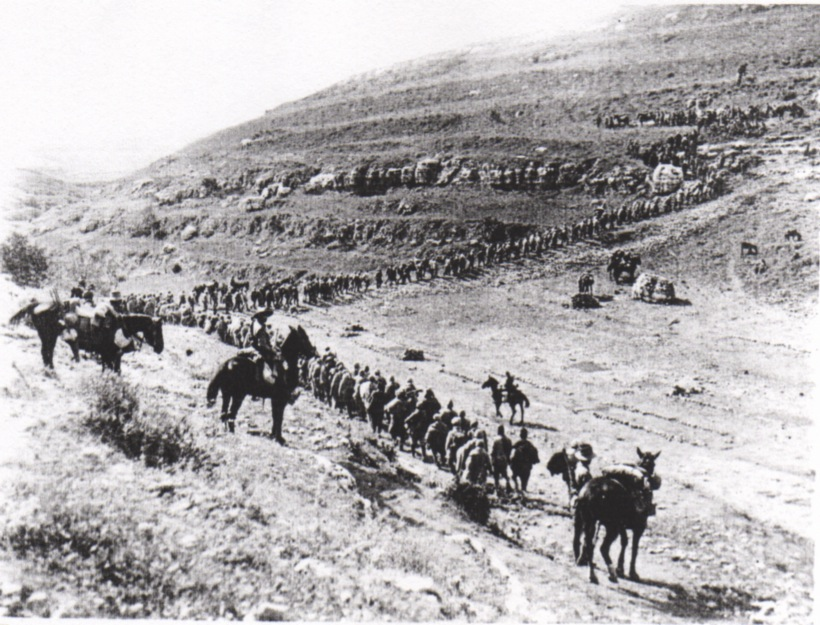
- Ottoman prisoners on their way to Jericho from Es Salt
Date	21 March – 2 April 1918
Location	From the Jordan River to Es Salt and Amman
Result	Ottoman-German victory

Belligerents
British Empire: United Kingdom of Great Britain and Ireland; Australia; British India; New Zealand; (Arab Revolt) Arab insurgents	German Empire; Ottoman Empire

Commanders and leaders
(British Empire) Edmund Allenby (British Empire) Philip Chetwode (British Empire) John Shea (Dominion of New Zealand) Edward Chaytor	(Ottoman Empire) Enver Pasha (German Empire) Liman von Sanders (Ottoman Empire) Jemal Pasha (Ottoman Empire) Asim

Units involved
Shea Group: 60th (London) Division; Anzac Mounted Division; Imperial Camel Corps Brigade	Fourth Army; 3rd and 46th Assault Companies; 48th Infantry Division; 145th and part 150th Regiments; German 703rd Infantry Battalion

Strength
Unknown	6,000 troops with 15 guns

Casualties and losses
215 dead 1,010 wounded 123 missing	1,000 prisoners of war 1,700 dead and wounded (estimate)

The First Transjordan attack on Amman (known to the British as the First Attack on Amman) and to their enemy as the First Battle of the Jordan took place between 21 March and 2 April 1918, as a consequence of the successful Battle of Tell 'Asur which occurred after the Capture of Jericho in February and the Occupation of the Jordan Valley began, during the Sinai and Palestine Campaign of World War I. During the First Transjordan attack large incursions into Ottoman territory occurred. Firstly the Passage of the Jordan River, was successfully captured between 21 and 23 March, followed by the first occupation of Es Salt in the hills of Moab between 24 and 25 March. The First Battle of Amman took place between 27 and 31 March when the Anzac Mounted Division and the Imperial Camel Corps Brigade (fighting dismounted as infantry) were reinforced by two battalions of 181st Brigade followed by a second two battalions from the 180th Brigade (60th London Division) and artillery. The Fourth Army headquarters located in Amman was strongly garrisoned and during the battle received reinforcements on the Hejaz railway, the strength of which eventually forced the attacking force to retire back to the Jordan Valley between 31 March and 2 April. The Jordan Valley would continue to be occupied by the Egyptian Expeditionary Force (EEF) through the summer until the middle of September 1918 when the Battle of Megiddo began.

During the winter of 1917/1918, the considerable territorial gains by the EEF as a consequence of victories at the Battle of Mughar Ridge in November and the Battle of Jerusalem in December, from the Gaza–Beersheba line to the Jaffa–Jerusalem line, were consolidated. The front line was adjusted in February 1918 when the right flank of the Jaffa–Jerusalem line was secured by the capture of land to the east of Jerusalem and down into the Jordan Valley to Jericho and the Dead Sea. The Capture of Jericho was also a necessary precursor, along with the action of Tell 'Asur, and advances by Allenby's force across the Jordan River and into the hills of Moab towards Es Salt and Amman.

In March, after several unsuccessful attempts by a British Empire force of Australian, British and New Zealand swimmers, the first Transjordan attack began with the passage of the Jordan River. The swimmers eventually got lines across the fast-flowing river while under fire from Ottoman forces on the east bank, and pontoon bridges were quickly constructed so that infantry and New Zealand mounted troops could cross the river to attack Ottoman defenders on the east bank where a bridgehead was eventually established. Subsequently, John Shea's force of infantry and mounted troops crossed the river and advanced eastwards across the high country; the central column of infantry moving along the main road quickly captured the Ottoman position at Shunet Nimrin on rising ground from the Jordan Valley and the town of Es Salt high in the hills.

Meanwhile, the mounted columns continued marching to the north and south of the infantry column on to Amman 30 miles (48 km) east of Jericho on the high plateau. Their objective was to effectively cut the main supply line to the north and south of Amman by destroying long sections of the Hejaz Railway, including tunnels and the Ten Arches Bridge over which the railway travelled near the town. Amman was strongly defended by the Ottoman Army and the blown up sections of the railway were quickly replaced to allow reinforcements to continue to arrive and strengthen the defenders. British Empire infantry and artillery reinforcements were also sent forward from Es Salt, both of which took considerable time to cover the difficult and unfriendly terrain. Although the combined force of infantry and mounted troops made a determined attack on Amman, Shea was forced to retreat to the Jordan Valley from both Amman and Es Salt when it became clear the defenders were too strong, making it extremely difficult, if not impossible to achieve the operation's objective. The only territorial gains following the offensive were the establishment of bridgeheads on the eastern side of the river.

== Background ==
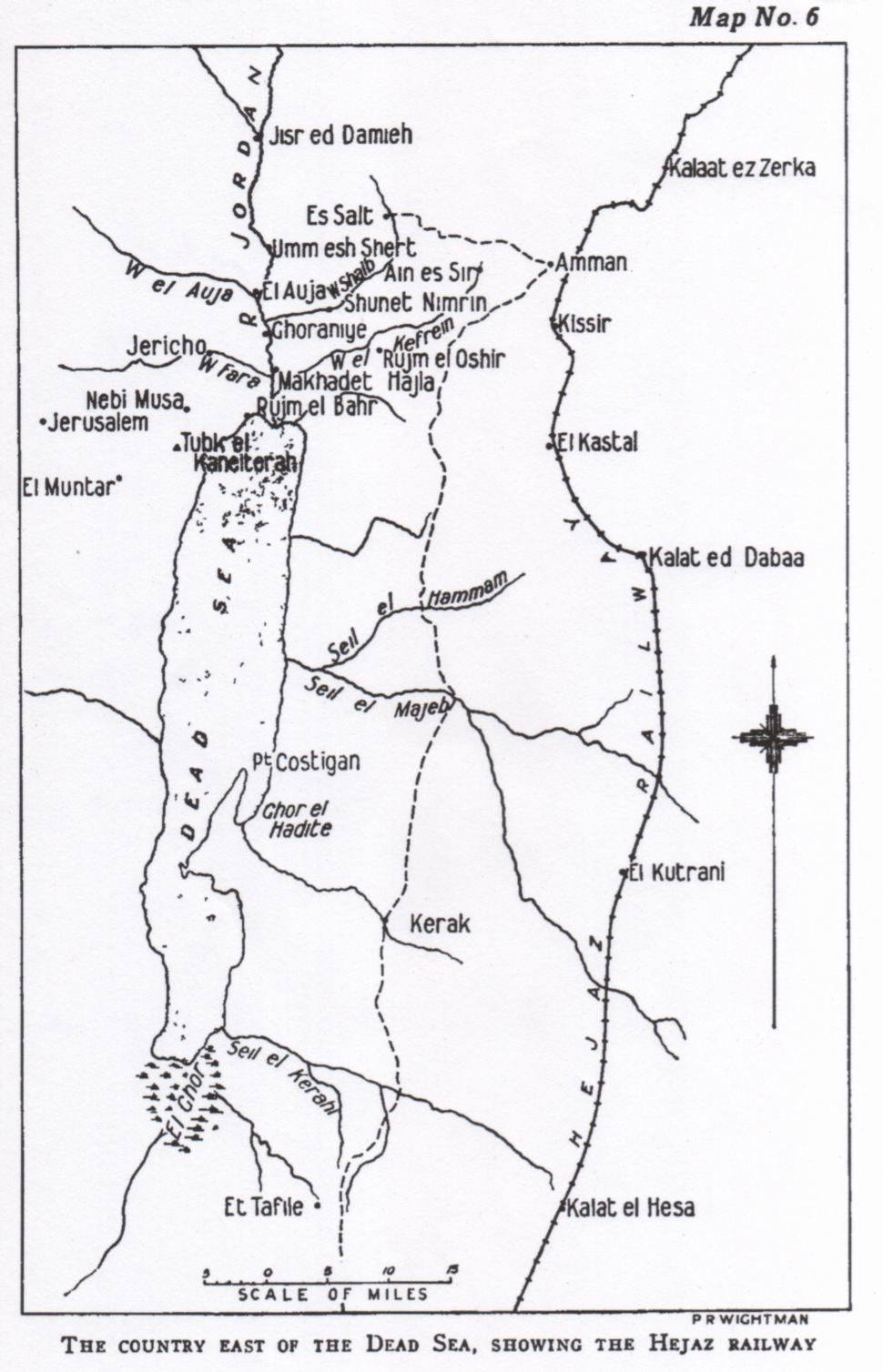
The Hejaz Railway and country east of the Dead Sea

The War Office promised General Edmund Allenby, Commander in Chief of the Egyptian Expeditionary Force (EEF), substantial reinforcements after his successful capture of Jerusalem. The Imperial War Cabinet was keen to know when Allenby would be ready to make further advances; they wished operations against the Ottomans to continue as forcefully as possible within the means at Allenby's disposal and they attached importance to the cutting the Hejaz Railway. The French, however, imposed an important qualification to Joint Note 12 which gave qualified approval for a decisive offensive against the Ottoman armies; no British troops in France could be deployed to the EEF. It was therefore decided to reinforce the EEF with one or possibly two British Indian Army cavalry divisions from France and three divisions from the Mesopotamian campaign, which were to be supported by more artillery and aircraft.

On 7 March 1918, the promised reinforcements were reduced to just one Indian division and four batteries of 6-inch howitzers from Mesopotamia due to arrive by the end of May. Further, Indian infantry battalions and cavalry regiments based in France were, during March and April, to be substituted for British infantry and mounted formations which had had long experience serving in Palestine; they would go to the Western Front. Four additional aircraft squadrons were, however, promised for the coming summer, in addition to squadrons then being formed and a Canadian construction battalion was to be sent from France as soon as its replacement, in the process of formation in Canada, arrived on the Western Front. Also promised were enough railway track to complete the doubling of the railway to Rafa and a single line beyond Haifa. By July it was hoped that 152 locomotives and 3,245 wagons would be available, with a promise of more if required; railway personnel and labour to run this railway were to come from Mesopotamia.

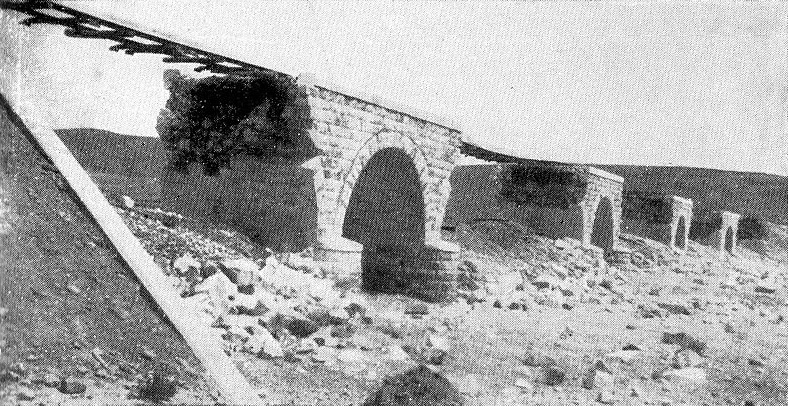
Part of 15 miles (24 km) of railway line blown up in May 1917 by the Anzac and Imperial Mounted Divisions' and the Imperial Camel Corps Brigade's engineers assisted by troopers

General Jan Christiaan Smuts, a member of the Imperial War Cabinet, had been sent to Palestine in early February to confer with Allenby regarding the implementation of Joint Note No. 12. At that time he encouraged Allenby in the view that if 10–15 miles (16–24 km) of the Hejaz Railway near Amman could be destroyed, the Ottoman Army garrisons along the railway south from Amman to Medina would be isolated and weakened, which could result in further Arab uprisings. Allenby had written to General William Robertson, the Chief of the Imperial General Staff, in late January regarding his wish to cut the Hejaz Railway at Amman – an important Ottoman line of communication to the garrisons to the south of Amman, which would considerably weaken their positions. Without reliable supplies and reinforcements Bedouin and Arab forces in the region could be encouraged to attack and rebel against these weakened Ottoman Empire forces and lengthen Allenby's right. (Note: It has been suggested the capture of the town of Amman was the objective of the first Transjordan attack; that it was to be developed into a base from which to mount an attack on the Maan station to the south as this was considered to be the most important Hejaz railway station between Deraa and Medina. [Bruce 2002, pp. 191–2]) Allenby continues: "If I could destroy 10 or 15 miles of rail and some bridges and get touch with the Arabs under Feisal – even temporarily – the effect would be great." (Note: He may have had in mind a similar attack carried out by the Anzac Mounted Division on 23 May 1917 when 15 miles (24 km) of railway including bridges were destroyed on the Ottoman railway from Beersheba to Auja. [Wavell 1968, p. 90, Powles 1922, pp. 110, 113] For a description of the procedure used to destroy the rails see Powles 1922, p. 112.)

A necessary prerequisite to the first Transjordan attack was a broadening of the EEF' base to better support the proposed attack on the Hejaz Railway at Amman. During the Battle of Tell 'Asur between 8 and 12 March 1918, the front line in the Judean Hills was pushed further north giving a substantially stronger base for attacks eastwards. A general advance on a front of between 14–26 miles (23–42 km) and up to a maximum of depth of between 5–7 miles (8.0–11.3 km) by the XX Corps and XXI Corps, pushed Ottoman forces north from the River Auja on the Mediterranean coast, north on both sides of the road from Jerusalem to Nablus, capturing Ras el Ain and Tell 'Asur and from Abu Tellul and Mussallabeh on the edge of the Jordan Valley.

=== The Balfour Declaration ===
Although it was not published in the Middle East at the time, the Balfour Declaration was published in London in November 1917 and became widely known. The declaration, which established the idea of a Jewish national homeland in Palestine, contained a proviso that such a homeland would not be at the expense of the rights of the Palestinians already living there. (Note: Bruce claims the contents of the declaration were soon known to Arab leaders. [Bruce 2002 p. 192])

The establishment of a Jewish homeland in Palestine depended on a compliant Palestinian population and the British were eager to conciliate wherever possible. Orders were issued to be "carefully friendly to the Arab tribes" from east of the Jordan River, as they fought with the Sharif of Mecca against the Ottomans. These Arabs were to be treated with the greatest consideration, all payments to them were made in cash and all friction was to be avoided. Politically, Britain needed Feisal's support and Feisal needed British military support and the British encouraged the people to look to Feisal and the Hashemites as their new rulers.

Military cooperation between the Arabs and the British Empire forces was expected during these Transjordan operations although it was to be fairly limited. T. E. Lawrence and the forces of the Arab Revolt based on Aqaba had blown up lengths of rail track, bridges and Ottoman supply trains with explosives. In early March Sherifian Arabs led by the Emir Feisal and guided by Lawrence were raiding Ottoman units south of El Kutrani and were in some force about Tafila on 11 March but withdrew a week later. In response the Ottoman Army sent a strong force including a German infantry battalion south from Amman to defend the railway and the important town of Ma'an. The Bedouin near Madaba were inclined to be hostile to the Ottoman Army and it was hoped that the planned attack on Amman might attract their support.

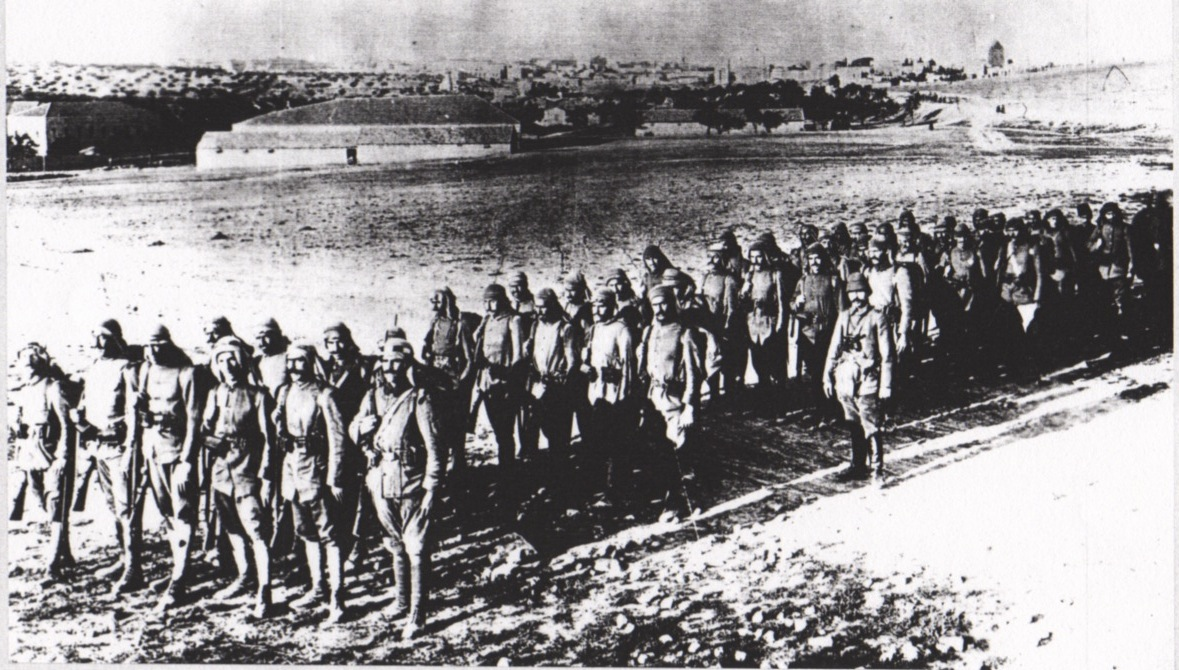
Ottoman infantry column c 1917. Many are wearing Keffiyehs

== Prelude ==
On 1 March, aircraft of No. 1 Squadron AFC reconnoitred El Kutrani and reported a camp of 150 tents, 14 large dumps, 150 rolling stock including three trains and seven gun positions south-west of the station. Nearby a new aerodrome with six hangars and a number of tents had two large two-seat aircraft on the ground. A combined Australian and British air raid on 4 March by Nos 1 and 142 Squadrons dropped 45 bombs on this aerodrome without much success. During the period the whole area on the Jordan front and the Amman position, including all camps and defence positions, was reconnoitred and mapped. At Shunet Nimrina a considerably increased Ottoman presence was noted on 3 March and successfully bombed on 6 March.

The establishment of a bridgehead on the east bank of the Jordan River and the advance to Es Salt and Amman was to be preceded by diversionary attacks across the entire front and coordinated with an Arab raid led by T. E. Lawrence on the Deraa Hejaz railway station.

Allenby ordered the infantry Major General, John Shea commander of the 60th (London) Division, to cross the Jordan River and attack Es Salt and Amman. The aim of these attacks was to destroy or damage a long viaduct known as the Ten Arches Bridge and tunnel near Amman on one of the Ottoman Empire's strategically important lines of communication – the Hejaz Railway. This rail line ran from Damascus southwards through eastern Syria 60 miles (97 km) east of Jerusalem all the way to Medina. By destroying the tunnel and viaduct which would be difficult to repair, the rail line could be cut for a considerable period of time and the Ottoman forces to the south would be isolated. Ottoman Army pressure on the Arab forces operating in the Ma'an area would be reduced and Allenby hoped Shea's attack would encourage the recall of a large Ottoman force which had occupied Tafila in March. Despite the extended front Shea's force would be operating on far from reinforcements, resistance to the attack was expected to be light.

=== Ottoman forces ===
The headquarters of the Ottoman Fourth, Seventh and Eighth Armies' were located at Amman east of the Jordan River, and at Nablus and Tulkarm in the Judean Hills, respectively, while their commander in chief's headquarters was at Nazareth.

About 4,000 to 5,000 German and Ottoman soldiers with rifles, a large number of machine guns and 15 guns defended fortified positions covering the railway viaduct and tunnel in the Amman area while another 2,000 Ottoman soldiers defended the region towards Es Salt. The force defending Shunet Nimrin, Es Salt and Amman, commanded by Lieutenant Colonel Asim, included the 3rd Assault Company with three infantry battalions, the German 703rd Infantry Battalion with some machine gun, cavalry and artillery units.

The assault detachment ... was composed of one infantry company (about 100 men), one engineer (pioneer) platoon (one officer, four NCOs and thirty men) and seven light machine-gun teams. The officers assigned to the assault detachments were hand-picked from within the division by divisional staff. The assault detachment was given four week's training in German-style stormtrooper tactics, to which the division sent an additional officer and five NCOs. Eventually the assault detachment was expanded into an assault battalion.

These assault battalions which consisted of between 300 and 350 officers and men were well equipped. They were frequently used in counterattacks and as divisional and corps reserves. The 3rd Assault Company was formed from a divisional detachment in late February 1918.

Defending Amman on 27 March the Ottoman and German garrison consisted of 2,150 rifles, 70 machine guns and ten guns. Jemal Kuchuk commander of the Fourth Army, arrived on 28 March to take command of the defence of Amman. Up to 30 March, approximately 2,000 reinforcements arrived with more to follow. In reserve at the Amman railway station were the 46th Assault Company from the infantry's 46th Division. Part of the 150th Regiment (48th Division) garrisoned Amman and part of the regiment guarded the railway to the north and south of the city. One battalion of this regiment and one battalion of the 159th Regiment with some Circassian irregular cavalry, guarded the region towards the Jordan River between Es Salt and Ghoraniyeh, manning posts guarding the river. The German 703rd Battalion which was "particularly strong in machine guns", had arrived back from Tafilah and was in the foothills on the Amman road by 21 March. These units amounted to no more than 1,500 rifles deployed between Amman and the Jordan River, when the EEF crossed the river.

German and Ottoman squadrons of aircraft in the area included single-seater Albatros D.V.a scouts and AEG two-seaters, Rumplers (260-h.p. Mercedes), LVGs (260-h.p. Benz) and Halberstadts all with similar flying-speeds to the British Bristol F.2 Fighters.

=== Shea's force ===
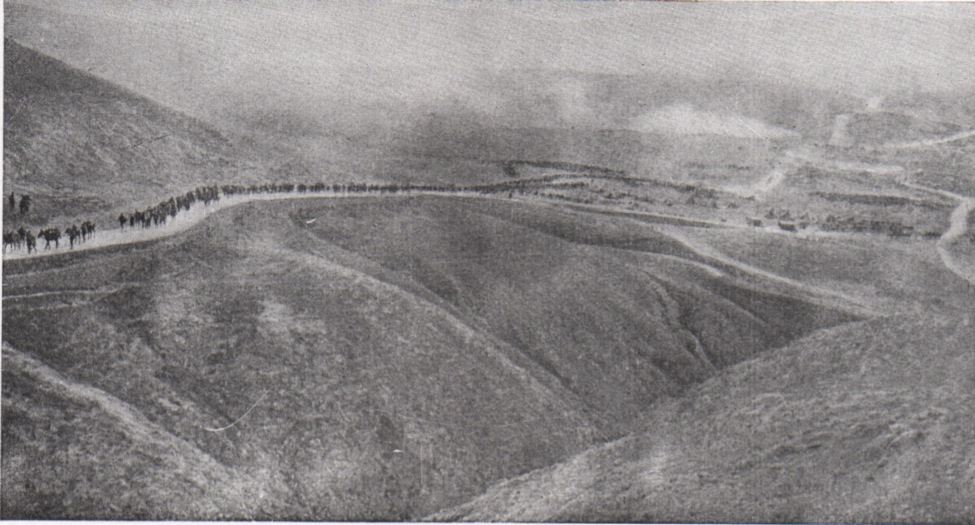
Infantry in the 60th (London) Division marching from Jerusalem to the Jordan Valley March 1918

Shea's force consisted of the 60th (London) Division, the Anzac Mounted Division (Australian and New Zealand Mounted Division), the Imperial Camel Corps Brigade including their assigned artillery battery the Hong Kong and Singapore Mountain Battery, with four BL 2.75 inch Mountain Guns, (firing 12-pounder shells) the 10th Heavy Battery Royal Garrison Artillery (RGA), a Light Armoured Car Brigade, the Army Bridging Train, Desert Mounted Corps Bridging Train and pontoon units. (Note: Blenkinsop refers to the 60th Indian Division but the Londoners did not leave for the Western Front until after the second Transjordan attack.) On several occasions during the concentration of Shea's force before the attack, German and Ottoman aircraft had bombed their camps while British Empire aircraft had been absent.

During these operations the remainder of the Egyptian Expeditionary Force continued to hold the front line, garrison the captured territories and supply the troops.

==== Supplies ====
The attacking forces lines of communication began at the Jerusalem railway station where supplies were offloaded on to lorries and driven to Jericho and later to the Jordan River 30 miles (48 km) away. The divisional trains of horse-drawn or mule-drawn wagons transported to Shunet Nimrin and Es Salt. Three echelons 550 camels of the Egyptian Camel Transport Corps were employed to supply the Anzac Mounted Division; one worked between Shunet Nimrin and Es Salt while the other two alternated carried one day's supplies to Amman. Two echelons of 805 camels each alternated to carry one day's supplies for the 60th (London) Division between Shunet Nimrin and Es Salt.

A dump was established with five days reserve supply at Junction Dump east of Talaat ed Dumm along with a reserve of camels.

=== Passage of the Jordan 21–23 March ===
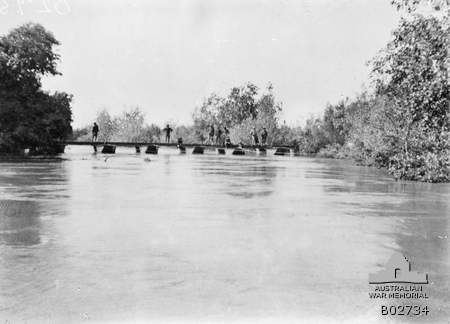
Pontoon bridge at Makhadet Hajlah

Two possible crossing places were identified by the Auckland Mounted Rifles Regiment during the month they patrolled the Jordan Valley after the capture of Jericho. These were at Ghoraniyeh and at Makhadet Hajlah (also known as Joshua's Crossing and the site of the baptism of Christ); these crossings were thought to be the only places bridges could be constructed at the time of year. Nevertheless, on 6 and 7 March a company of the London 179th Brigade from the 60th (London) Division attempted unsuccessfully to ford the river at El Mandesi 3 miles (4.8 km) north of the site of the old stone bridge at Ghoraniyeh, which had been blown up by the retiring Ottoman Army. (Note: The 179th Brigade is referred to by Woodward as the "London and Scottish 179th Brigade, 60th Division." [Woodward 2006 p. 163])

Several days of heavy rain caused the river to rise and become many feet deep, filling from bank to bank in a swiftly flowing torrent with strong currents. Lieutenant General Philip Chetwode, commander of XX Corps, expressed his concerns regarding the state of the Jordan River in a letter to Allenby on 18 March 1918, when he described the heavy rain and the resulting rise in the river's height and his concerns that these may threaten the viability of Transjordan operations. The unusually heavy March rains caused the Jordan River to flood forcing a postponement of operations for two days during which the weather improved slightly and the river dropped back to within its banks.

==== 21 March ====
While the Anzac Mounted Division concentrated in the Talaat ed Dumm area the Imperial Camel Corps Brigade arrived in the area from Bethlehem and the 60th (London) was near the Wadi Nueiame at Ghoraniyeh with one battalion in the Wadi Kelt 3.5 miles (5.6 km) further south at Makhadet Hijla. The 53rd Division garrisoned the Wadi el Auja. Shea planned to put three bridges across at Ghoraniyeh; a standard pontoon, a barrel pier and a footbridge and at Makhadet Hijla a cavalry steel pontoon bridge.

They were opposed by an Ottoman force of about 1,000 rifles, some squadrons of cavalry and six guns.

The 180th Brigade was to force both crossings before advancing up the road to the foothills. The 179th Brigade was to move up the Wadi Abu Turra track on the left of the 180th Brigade while the 181st Brigade remained in reserve at Ghoraniyeh bridgehead. The mounted troops were to cross at Makhadet Hijla.

At 15:00 hundreds of Ottoman infantry approached Ghoraniyeh while two squadrons of Ottoman cavalry approached Makhadet Hijla. At midnight on 21 March, the day the German spring offensive was launched on the Western Front, another attempt to cross the Jordan began. Two infantry battalions from the 180th Brigade, 60th (London) Division; the 2/19th Battalion London Regiment prepared to swim the river and 2/18th Battalion London Regiment was sent to reinforce them as nine swimmers and Australian engineers crossed with a line at 12:30 at Makhadet Hijla and pulled a raft with six men across without opposition. Meanwhile, the 2/17th Battalion, London Regiment attempted to launch several boats and small rafts at Ghoraniyeh under enemy fire.

Pontoons had to be secured very strongly and yet allow for any sudden rise or fall ... These conditions made it a hazardous movement for mounted men, any break during the transit causing immersion in the raging water with little or no hope of surviving."

— A. S. Benbow, 9th Company, Imperial Camel Corps Brigade

Two swimmers were lost and at Ghoraniyeh and the 2/17th Battalion, London Regiment suffered severe casualties trying to get a line across the river. Later, repeated unsuccessful attempts were made to cross the river in punts and rafts. Many were drowned when Asim's German and Ottoman defenders opened fire on barges made of wood and tarpaulins stretched over framework which became waterlogged after being holed by gunfire. All attempts to put rafts across at Ghoraniyeh were defeated and Brigadier General Watson, commanding the 180th Brigade decided to concentrate all efforts at Makhadet Hijla ordering the 2/20th Battalion and the 2/17th Battalion London Regiments to reinforce the bridgehead there. Steel chains were eventually attached to trees and a temporary bridge constructed. Working under Ottoman fire, this first bridge was established by sappers from an Australian and New Zealand engineer unit which had been training for three weeks. By 01:30 a second pontoon bridge at Makhadet Hajlah had been finished by the Anzac Bridging Train.

=== Bridgehead established ===
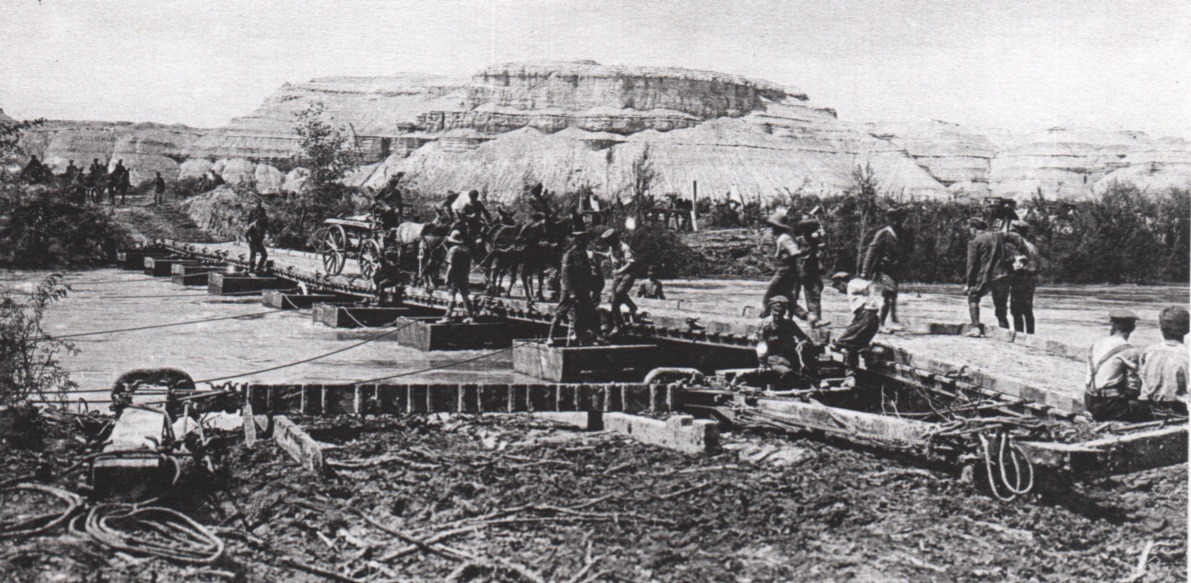
IWM Q12602:Pontoon bridge across the Jordan River at Ghoraniyeh near Jericho

By 07:45 the whole of the 2/19th Battalion London Regiment was across the Jordan River. The 2/18th Battalion London Regiment was across the Jordan by 10:00 using the cavalry pontoon bridge which the Anzac Mounted Division's field squadron had completed at 08:10 the remaining battalions of the 180th Brigade reached the right bank at Makhadet Hijla by about 13:30. Chetwode and H.R.H. the Duke of Connaught complimented the brigade on the passage.

By nightfall on 22 March an infantry battalion had crossed the Jordan River and established a 1,000-yard (910 m) bridgehead on the eastern bank. Despite being hampered by dense jungle and Ottoman machine gun fire during the day together with artillery which bombarded the slopes, an infantry brigade crossed the river and during the night the bridgehead was pushed out. (Note: On the night of 21/22 March a Company from the London Regiment had forced their way across the Jordan River at Makhadet Hajleh, and by the following night the whole battalion was across and at daybreak on 23 March all was clear to the east and south east for at least 500 yards (460 m). [The Auckland Mounted Rifles Regiment's War Diary March 1918 Report on Operations AWM4-35-2-34])

The 181st Brigade was ordered to make another attempt to cross the Jordan River at Ghoraniyeh during the night of 22/23 March which failed.

At 04:00 on 23 March the Auckland Mounted Rifles Regiment attached to the 180th Brigade, began to cross the river at Makhadet Hajlah. Two squadrons pushed Ottoman units back out of the country on the eastern bank as far north as Ghoraniyeh while one squadron was sent eastwards. This squadron, armed with their .303 rifles and bayonets, charged into the Ottoman cavalry and overran it. Lieutenant K. J. Tait and his lead troop of 20 men intercepted 60 sabre-carrying Ottoman cavalry on a track near Qabr Mujahid. Remaining mounted the New Zealanders galloped and shot as many as 20 Ottoman soldiers capturing 7 prisoners. Tait was killed in a hand to hand duel with the Ottoman cavalry officer. (Note: Kinloch quotes from the Auckland Mounted Rifles Regiment's War Diary which describes these New Zealanders "using their rifles at the gallop" aiming and firing their .303s at the same time as they maintained control of their horses. The war diary notes the New Zealanders' lack of swords; "This was one of the few occasions on which a weapon for shock action would have been useful."[Auckland Mounted Rifles Regiment March War Diary AWM4-35-2-34])

Meanwhile, the two squadrons which rode north towards Ghoraniyeh were not stopped by any of the Ottoman posts they attacked, before they reached the main road. Here they encountered a strongly held position; here the Ottoman infantry stood their ground while a troop of the Auckland Mounted Rifles Regiment's 3rd Squadron galloped into them capturing a machine gun and turning it on the escaping Ottoman soldiers. By noon they had reached the eastern back of Ghoraniyeh. This bold attack on Ghoraniyeh coincided with a successful attempt by infantry in the 60th (London) Division to cross the river; they soon had their pontoon bridge across and by nightfall were beginning to cross the river in numbers. During these engagements the Auckland Mounted Rifles Regiment galloped down detachments of Ottoman infantry and cavalry capturing 68 prisoners and four machine guns. (Note: The Regiment less the 11th Squadron moved to attack Ghoraniyeh at the gallop; at Butmet Halhul at 07:45 they charged mounted capturing 17 prisoners without casualty. Meanwhile the troop of 11th Squadron sent north had driven in and captured an Ottoman post of 18 soldiers with two machine guns on a position overlooking Kasr el Yehud. An attempt was made by the 4th Squadron to capture Shunet Nimrin while the 3rd Squadron succeeded in capturing the high ground overlooking Ghoraniyeh aided by Lieutenant Collins' troop which attacked mounted and captured two guns and ten prisoners. The remainder of the Squadron routed the Ottoman soldiers allowing the Royal Engineers to start work on a bridge. By nightfall artillery and supplies were crossing the river at Ghoraniyeh while the remainder of the Anzac Mounted Division crossed the river at Makhadet Hajleh. The 3rd Squadron later joined the 4th attacking Shunet Nimrin but the position was too strongly held and they were forced to retire under artillery fire in lines of troop columns at irregular internals. [Auckland Mounted Rifles Regiment's War Diary March 1918 Report on Operations AWM4-35-2-34])

=== Shea's force crosses the Jordan ===
At Makhadet Hajlah mounted rifle, light horse and camels crossed by a pontoon bridge; a second was also constructed, while at Ghoraniyeh, a footbridge was constructed by 16:30 on 23 March, by which time the 2/21st Battalion London Regiment had crossed by rafts. A pontoon bridge and a heavy barrel-pier bridge were built by 21:30 providing altogether five bridges across the Jordan River.

The 303rd Brigade R.F.A. crossed by the pontoon bridge at Ghorniyeh. At midnight the Anzac Mounted Division was concentrated near Kasr Hajlah; and at 01:00 on the morning of 24 March, the 1st Light Horse Brigade began to cross the Jordan River by the pontoon bridge at Makhadet Hajlah. The New Zealand Mounted Rifles Brigade followed to join the Auckland Mounted Rifle Regiment and by 05:00 the leading brigade of Shea's force was 2 miles (3.2 km) along the Es Salt road moving to the east of Hajlah, and the three infantry brigades of the 60th (London) Division were between Ghoraniyeh and Shunet Nimrin, the latter dominated by the hill of El Haud.

In a telegram to the War Office of 25 March 1918, Allenby reported to the War Office, "Three bridges were thrown across Jordan during the night of 23rd–24th March, and by 8 a.m, LXth Division [60th Division], Anzac Division and Imperial Camel Corps Brigade were east of the river."

=== Light horse defend the northern flank in the Jordan Valley ===
The Anzac Mounted Division was split into three; divisional headquarters with the 2nd Light Horse Brigade and the Imperial Camel Corps Brigade advanced straight towards Amman by the Na'ur track, the New Zealand Mounted Rifles Brigade with the Auckland Mounted Rifles Regiment reattached advanced along the Ain es Sir track, while the 1st and 2nd Light Horse Regiments of the 1st Light Horse Brigade took up a position with its left on the Jordan River near Umm esh Shert to cover the northern flank of the advance while the 3rd Light Horse Regiment advanced up the Umm esh Shert track towards Es Salt.

Moving up the eastern bank of the river to the north of the infantry, the 1st Light Horse Brigade got about 1 mile (1.6 km) north of the El Mandesi ford; halfway between the Ghoraniyeh crossing and Umm esh Shert. The 1st and 3rd Light Horse Regiments (1st Light Horse Brigade) moved to protect the left or northern flank of the 60th (London) Division, and to cooperate with this infantry division, in their attack on Es Salt, while the 2nd Light Horse Regiment (1st Light Horse Brigade) remained in the rear to occupy the Es Salt road from the foothills to the high plateau; here good water was found in Wadi Ralen which was developed by engineers. (Note: On 24 March the 3rd Light Horse Regiment pushed Ottoman units back, eventually forcing them to retire over the Umm es Shert crossing. The following day the 2nd Light Horse Regiment pushed north as far as Wady Ishkarara (approximately halfway between Umm esh Shert and Mafid Jozele near Red Hill) before being forced by Ottoman units to withdraw back to the Umm esh Shert line covering the entrance to the track to Es Salt, up which the 3rd Light Horse Regiment had advanced to occupy Es Salt. Until 2 April (when they formed part of the rearguard), the 1st and 2nd Light Horse Regiments supported by artillery and a L. A. M. Battery, defended the line covering the Umm esh Shert track from increasingly strong Ottoman forces which crossed the river at Jisr ed Damieh. [1st Light Horse Brigade's War Diary March and April 1918 AWM 4-10-1-44, 45] See Gullett's Map 34 showing positions at sundown on 1 May during the second Transjordan operations, for the locations of these places.)

=== Occupation of Es Salt 24–25 March ===
Es Salt, was 15 miles (24 km) north east from the Ghoraniyeh crossing of the Jordan River and 4,000 feet (1,200 m) above the Jordan River. Before the war the city had a population of between 10,000 and 15,000 Arab, Christian, Ottoman and Cicassians living in stone buildings half of whom were Christian.

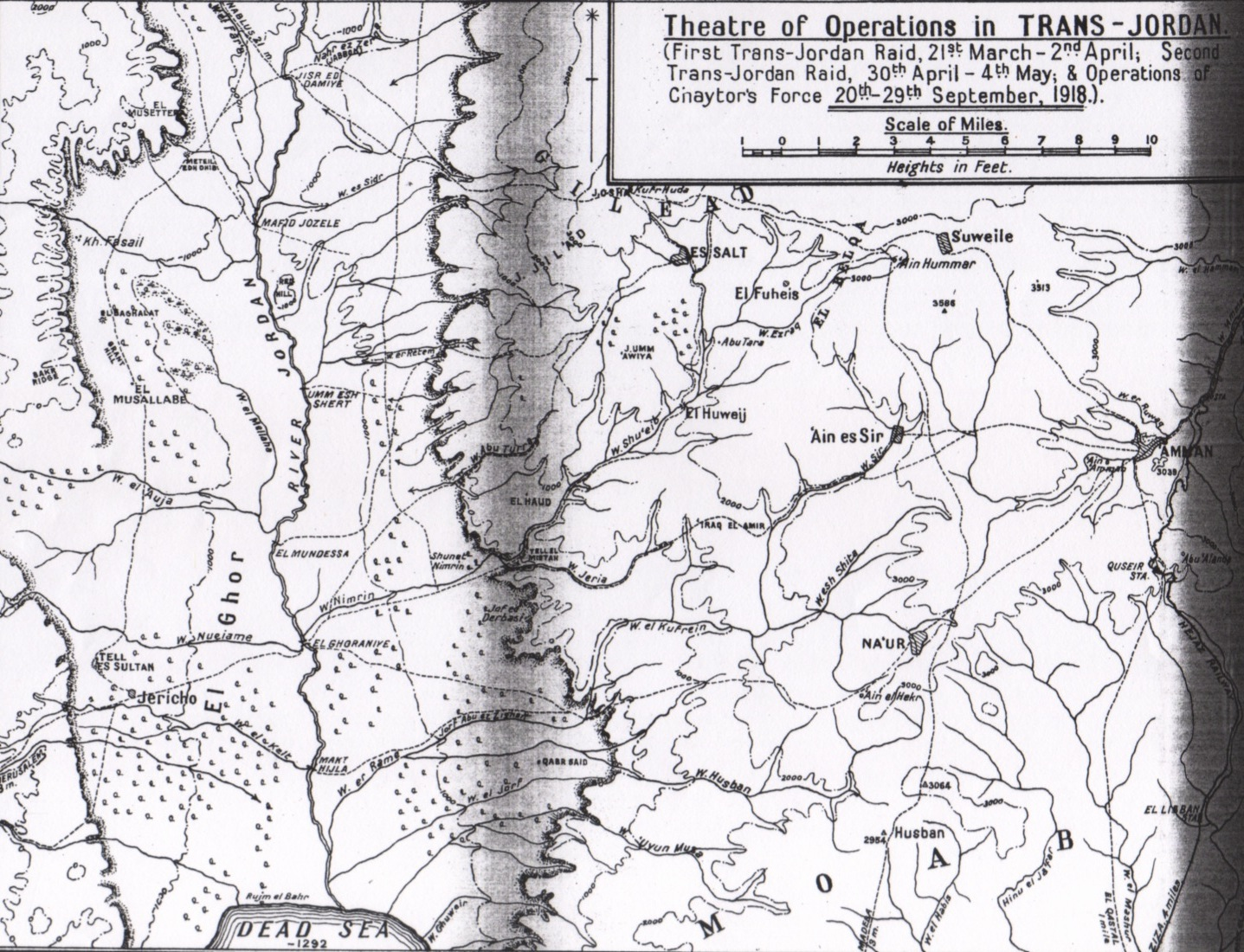
Transjordan theatre of operations 21 March to 2 April; 30 April to 4 May and 20 to 29 September 1918

The infantry division followed the sealed metal road from the Ghoraniyeh crossing 6 miles (9.7 km) across the Jordan Valley before reaching the Shunet Nimrin defile at the foot of the hills of Moab. The advance began at 08:30 on 24 March with the 181st Brigade on the right, the 179th on the left; each with two battalions in line with the 180th Brigade in reserve. The 2/14th Battalion London Regiment (179th Brigade) captured three officers and 33 men of the German 703rd Battalion near Shunet Nimrin at El Haud a cone-shaped hill north of the road and 6 miles (9.7 km) east of the Jordan River.

At Tell el Mistah the 2/22nd Battalion London Regiment captured three guns while the 181st Brigade with a squadron of the Wellington Mounted Rifle Regiment attached captured the bridge across the Wadi Shu'eib at Huweij 4 miles (6.4 km) south of Es Salt, but was forced to halt when darkness ended operations for the day. As a consequence of this action, a fourth road, leading up to the plateau passed the Circassian village of Ain es Sir on the Wadi Sir which lead directly to Amman, became available for use by the attackers.

By nightfall on 24 March infantry from the 60th (London) Division with the 6th Squadron, Wellington Mounted Rifles Regiment attached, was 4 miles (6.4 km) beyond Shunet Nimrin, marching up the motor road from Ghoraniyeh bridge to Es Salt. From Shunet Nimrin the road winds along the side of the desolate hills bordering the Wady Shaib to begin an 11-mile (18 km) climb in a north easterly direction towards Es Salt 2,050 feet (620 m) above sea level.

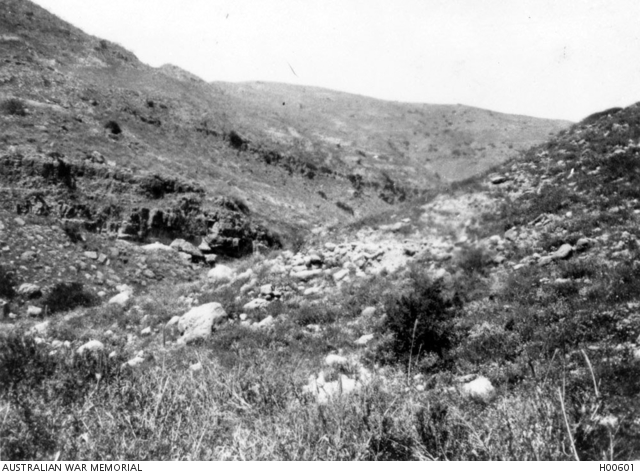
Trees mark a steep portion of the road to Es Salt as it passed through the Wadi Es Salt

On 25 March, the 181st Brigade marching on the main road covered only 8–9 miles (13–14 km) due mainly to the condition of the road, with the 179th Brigade on the Wadi Abu Turra track a little to the north, had reached the Tel el Musta to El Haud line with infantry advanced guards ahead. Aircraft reported no sign of opposition and the brigade pushed ahead in the later afternoon to arrive at the junction of the Wadi Abu Turra and Umm esh Shert tracks 4 miles (6.4 km) from Es Salt where they met the 3rd Light Horse Regiment (1st Light Horse Brigade). (Note: The routes used were the main road, the Na'ur track, the Ain es Sir track, the Wadi Abu Turra track (also known as the Wadi Arseniyat track "owing to a defective map") and the Umm esh Shert track. [Falls 1930 Vol. 2 p. 330]) Aircraft which included an Australian Martinsyde, had bombed Shunet Nimrin ahead of the infantry attack.

The 3rd Light Horse Regiment occupied Es Salt at 18:00 on 25 March and the advanced guard of the 179th Brigade entered the town two hours later. The 6th Squadron of the Wellington Mounted Rifles Regiment (New Zealand Mounted Rifles Brigade) remained with the infantry to garrison and defend the town. While the two brigades of the Anzac Mounted Division; the New Zealand Mounted Rifles and the 2nd Light Horse Brigades with the Imperial Camel Corps Brigade were to move directly from the Jordan Valley to Amman following tracks further south along the Jordan Valley and climb up to the plateau.

=== Trek to Amman ===
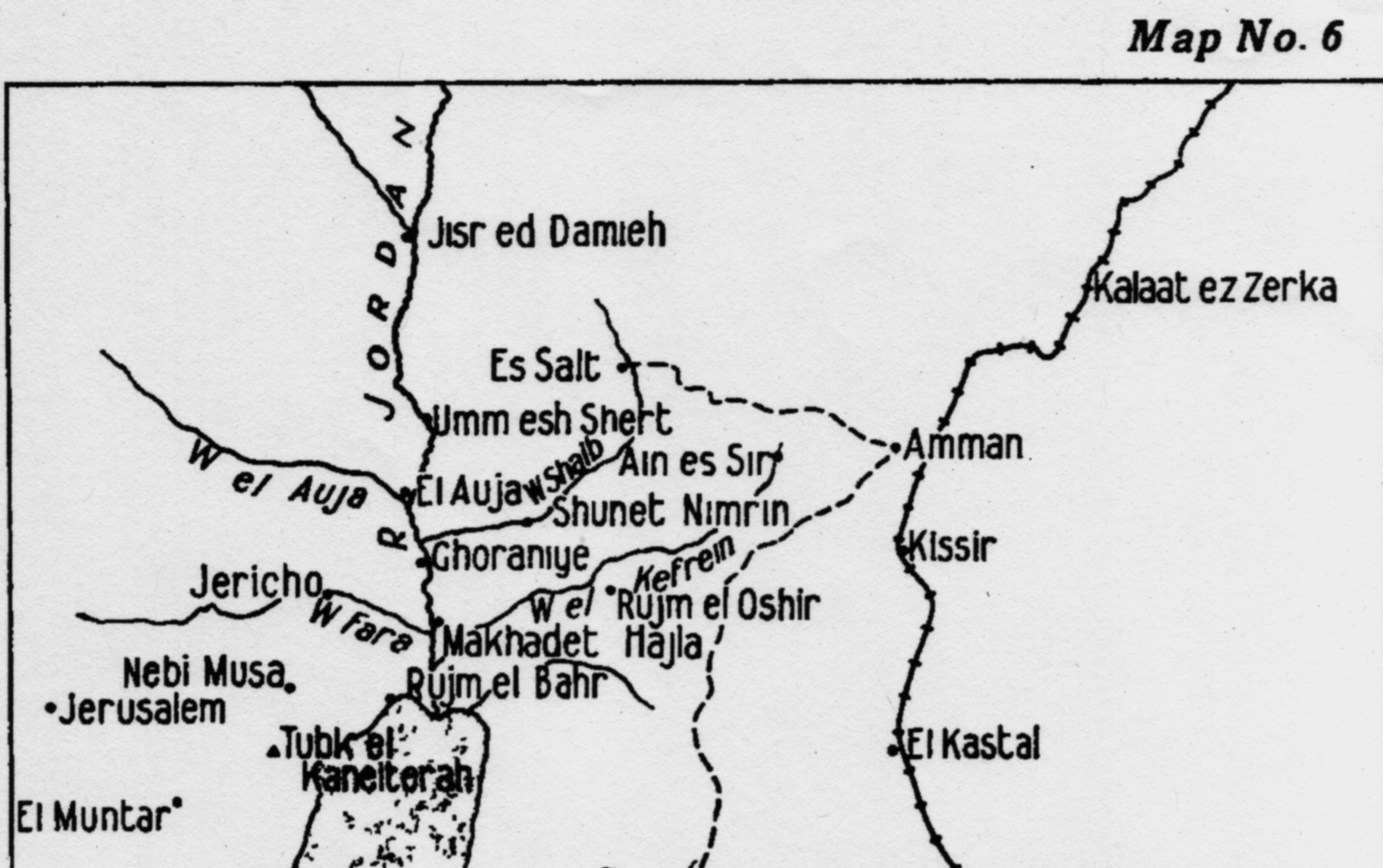
Map of Transjordan

Amman, which is a further 18 miles (29 km) to the east southeast across the plateau from Es Salt is 3,000 feet (910 m) above sea level, 950 feet (290 m) higher than Es Salt. The Anzac Mounted Division moved on the right of the infantry advance to Es Salt from Makhadet Hajlah across the Jordan Valley on the road to Naaur; one column moving up the Wadi el Kefrein sent forward a light detachment to secure the bridge at El Howeij. Near the Wadi el Kefrein a group of Arabs joined the light horse units. (Note: This column is probably the one which moved along the Naaur track as it included light horsemen, while the New Zealand Mounted Rifles Brigade also moved along the Wade el Kefrein before branching off into the Wadi Sir. See Gullett's Map 35 which shows these tracks and the tangle of wadies.)

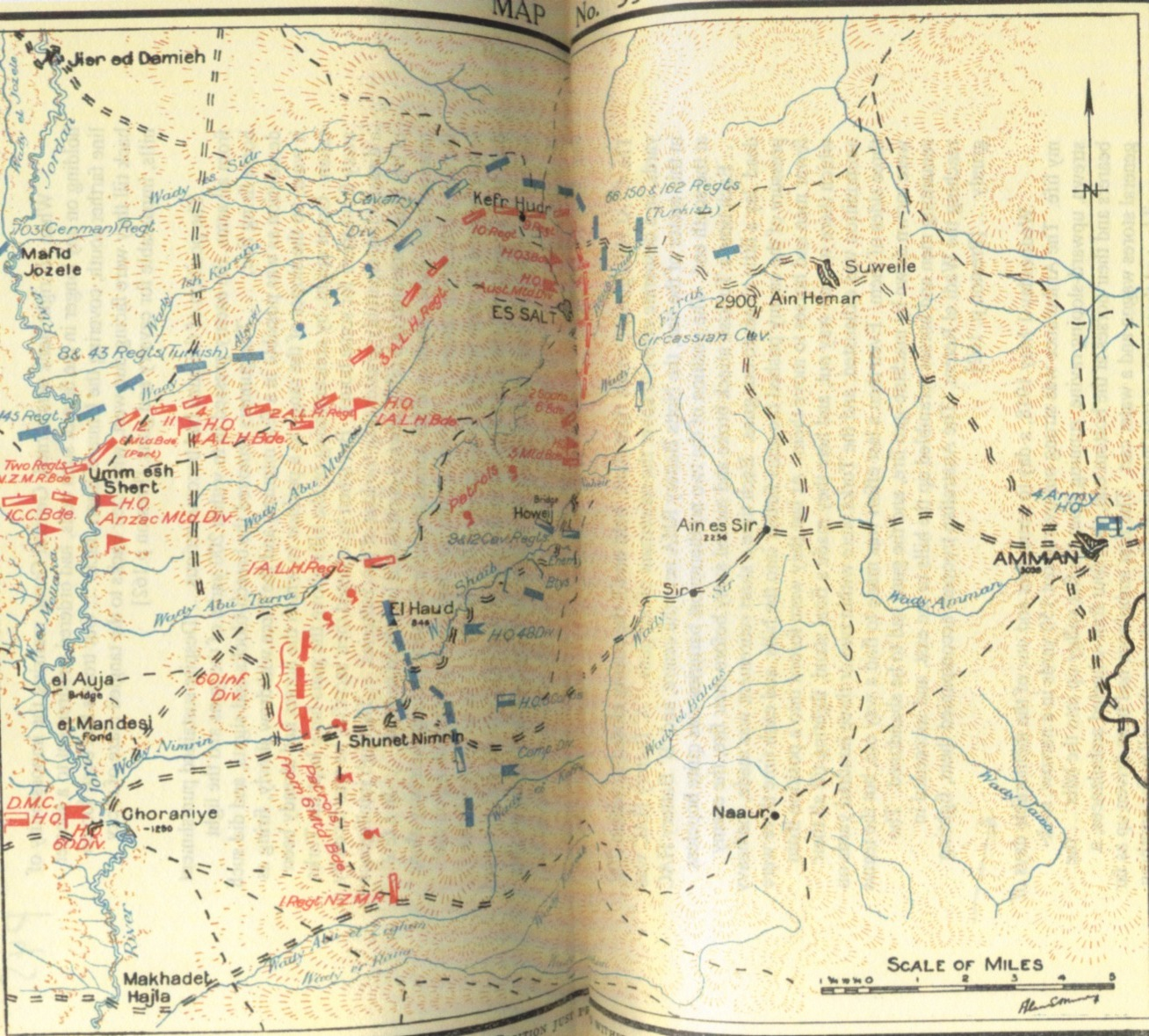
Although Gullett's Map 35 shows positions on 2 May during the Second Transjordan it clearly shows the Naaur and Ain es Sir tracks to Amman

The divisional headquarters of the Anzac Mounted Division together with the 2nd Light Horse Brigade and the Imperial Camel Corps Brigade marched towards Amman on the number three road, a track well to the south of the main road which passed through the village of Naaur some 3 miles (4.8 km) to the south of Shunet Nimrin. From the Jordan River at 1,200 feet (370 m) below sea level, the road to Naaur 16 miles (26 km) away rises 4,300 feet (1,300 m); the country was a maze of rocky hills intersected by deep ravines. The head of the mounted force reached the top at about 02:00 on 25 March but was stretched out in single file for about 8 miles (13 km) along the side of the mountains.

This southern route via Naaur was the most difficult with a steep grade and the track was narrow, rocky and slippery being only wide enough for horses to move in single file and many camels, their hoofs better suited to sand, frequently slipped and fell. They continued marching through the night along roads marked on maps which were soon discovered to be little more than the beds of wadis in which the heavy rain quickly made into muddy streams. After trekking 10 miles (16 km) in 24 hours, they reached Ain el Hekr on the edge of the plateau.

As the road to Naaur dwindled away to a track all wheels had to be left behind including most of the reserve small arms ammunition (SAA). Only four small pack mountain guns, a little reserve ammunition (two boxes of SAA to a camel) and the explosives required to demolish the viaduct and tunnels, were put on camels and pack-horses to make the trek forward.

Meanwhile, the New Zealand Mounted Rifles Brigade took a path half a mile beyond Shunet Nimrin towards Rujm el Oshir, along the Wadi es Sir through Ain es Sir direct to Amman. This track was about midway between the divisional headquarters column on the Naaur track and the main road to Es Salt. The New Zealanders reached Air es Sir at noon capturing two Ottoman officers and 48 other ranks and at 13:30 the brigade concentrated at the cross roads above the town. There, they remained close to the village, for 24 hours while the column closed up; the last camel arriving at 19:30 on 26 March. (Note: The remainder of the Anzac Mounted Division joined the New Zealand Mounted Rifles Brigade at Ain es Sir at 08:00 on 26 March. [New Zealand Mounted Rifles Brigade War Diary 26 March 1918 AWM 4-35-1-35])

==== Anzac Mounted Division at Ain es Sir ====
After a second night's march in the cold and wet conditions moving over both bog and rock, the Anzac Mounted Division concentrated at Ain es Sir on the early morning of 26 March 6 miles (9.7 km) west of Amman. The weather was atrocious; sleet and heavy rain continued for almost the entire operation making the roads and tracks soft and boggy and all supplies of rations and forage had to be sent up to the advancing troops on camels and pack-horses.

By this stage the advance had been on the march continuously for three days and nights and owing to the exhaustion of the men and horses, Chaytor, commander of the mounted division, postponed the attack on Amman until the next morning. During the day a patrol of six German infantry was captured, another German approaching the lines was shot and a cavalry patrol of three men were "accounted for." The 2nd Light Horse Brigade advanced to the north of the Es Salt to Amman road capturing prisoners in the village of Suweileh and 30 German lorries were found bogged on the road from Es Salt, 21 of the derelict lorries were destroyed. As soon as it was dark a special patrol of a troop of the Wellington Mounted Rifles Regiment set out to cut the railway line to the south of Amman. They rode 10 miles (16 km) there and back in darkness and pouring rain, successfully blowing up a section of railway line south of Amman. A similar group from the 2nd Light Horse Brigade attempted to wreck the line north of Amman but was unsuccessful although a two-arched bridge on the railway north of Amman was destroyed.

== Battle for Amman 27–30 March ==
The delay in the advance of Shea's force on 26 March caused by the terrible conditions gave the Ottoman forces ample warning to consolidate their defences. Nevertheless, during the battle small gains were made which began to make an impact on the strongly entrenched German and Ottoman forces.

The attack on Amman began on 27 March and continued until 30 March while German and Ottoman reinforcements continued to steadily arrive along the unharmed Hejaz Railway from the north. About 4,000 to 5,000 German and Ottoman soldiers with rifles and 15 guns were in position covering the railway viaduct and tunnel while another 2,000 Ottoman soldiers moved towards Es Salt from the north. An additional 15,000 German and Ottoman troops with 15 guns reinforced Amman, while at dawn on 27 March two British infantry battalions of the 181st Brigade, left Es Salt to reinforce the two brigades of the Anzac Mounted Division (commanded by Chaytor) and the Imperial Camel Corps Brigade with three mountain gun batteries, in their attack on Amman. The British infantry reinforcements were delayed near Suweileh by local fighting between Circassians and Arabs, while a Royal Horse Artillery (RHA) Battery also moved from Es Salt towards Amman with great difficulty, arriving on the last day of battle.

=== Casualties ===
Total casualties of both infantry and mounted divisions were between 1,200 and 1,348. The 60th (London) Division suffered 476 infantry casualties including 347 wounded and the Anzac Mounted Division suffered 724 casualties including 551 wounded.

=== Ottoman counterattack in the Jordan Valley ===
During the afternoon of 29 March, 1,800 rifles and sabres of the 145th Regiment (46th Division) from the Ottoman Seventh Army based at Nablus, crossed the Jordan River at Jisr ed Damieh and attacked the left (northern) flank which was defended by the 1st and 2nd Light Horse Regiments (1st Light Horse Brigade). This counterattack represented a very serious threat to the British lines of communication and supply to Es Salt and Amman and an infantry battalion was sent to reinforce the light horsemen. (Note: A similar attack took place during the second Transjordan operations when the 4th Light Horse Brigade had the job of the two regiments of the 1st Light Horse Brigade and was similarly attacked by reinforcements which crossed on 1 May at the Jisr ed Damieh on the main road from the Ottoman Seventh Army at Nablus to the Ottoman Fourth Army at Amman.) The Ottoman regiment eventually advanced up the road towards Es Salt capturing the heights at Kufr Huda north of Es Salt.

The counterattack by German and Ottoman forces from the direction of Nahr ez Zerka to the north of Jisr ed Damieh on the eastern side of the Jordan Valley continued to threaten Shea's and Chaytor's northern flank. This flank, held by the 1st and 2nd Light Horse Regiments was reinforced, at the expense of the Amman attack.

=== Ottoman counterattack on Es Salt ===
By 30 March the 1,800 rifles and sabres of the 145th Regiment (46th Division) from the Ottoman Seventh Army based at Nablus, which had crossed the Jordan River at Jisr ed Damieh to attack Kufr Huda the day before, were arriving near Es Salt and threatening the occupation of the town by Shea's force. During the night of 30/31 March, these Ottoman reinforcements continued to push in on Es Salt.

=== Aerial support ===
Bombing raids were carried out on camps on the Jerusalem to Nablus road between Lubban and Nablus, while the Jisr ed Damieh was bombed and machine gunned several times without causing damage to the bridge but the garrison in the area was hit; between 19 and 24 March seven more attempts were made to damage the bridge without success.

During this Transjordan operation, aircraft continuously flew over and reported progress; on 22 and 24 March Ottoman units in the Wady Fara region were seen to be active, as was the Nablus base camp, and infantry and transport were seen marching towards Khurbet Ferweh and the Jisr ed Damieh. On 24 March a large troop-train at Lubin station on the Hejaz Railway south of Amman was attacked by aircraft with machine-guns; 700 rounds were fired into the enemy troops.

=== Medical support ===
The total time taken to evacuate to Jericho from the front line was about 24 hours and the distance 45 miles (72 km) with a further three hours on to Jerusalem. Wounded were carried on light stretchers or blankets from the front line to regimental aid posts which were established about 1.5 miles (2.4 km) in the rear. Advanced dressing stations were established about 3 miles (4.8 km) behind these aid posts; sand carts making the journey in three to six hours. Between some dressing stations and the nearest clearing station on the Es Salt to Amman road, wounded had to be transported 10 miles (16 km) on cacolet camels or strapped to their horses. A divisional collecting station was established 6 miles (9.7 km) further back at Birket umm Amud to which wounded were carried in cacolet camels; the journey taking between six and seven hours. Horse-drawn ambulances then took wounded back to the Jordan Valley. In the rear of these divisional collecting stations, the road through Suweileh and Es Salt to El Howeij 5 miles (8.0 km) was passable by wheeled transport and the remainder of the journey to Jericho was in motor ambulances.

With their equipment carried on pack-horses and pack-camels, the mobile sections of the field ambulances along with 35 cacolet camels for each ambulance, followed the attacking force to Es Salt and Amman. Their motor ambulances, ambulance wagons and sand carts remained near Jericho ready to transport wounded from the receiving station at Ghoraniyeh to the main dressing station west of Jericho. Here the Desert Mounted Corps Operating Unit and consulting surgeon were attached. Wounded were then sent back to the two casualty clearing stations in Jerusalem.

From the Jordan Valley it was a 50 miles (80 km) ride in a motor ambulance over the mountains of Judea to the hospital railway train, followed by 200 miles (320 km) train ride to hospital in Cairo, though some of the worst cases were accommodated in the hospitals in Jerusalem.

=== Supplies ===
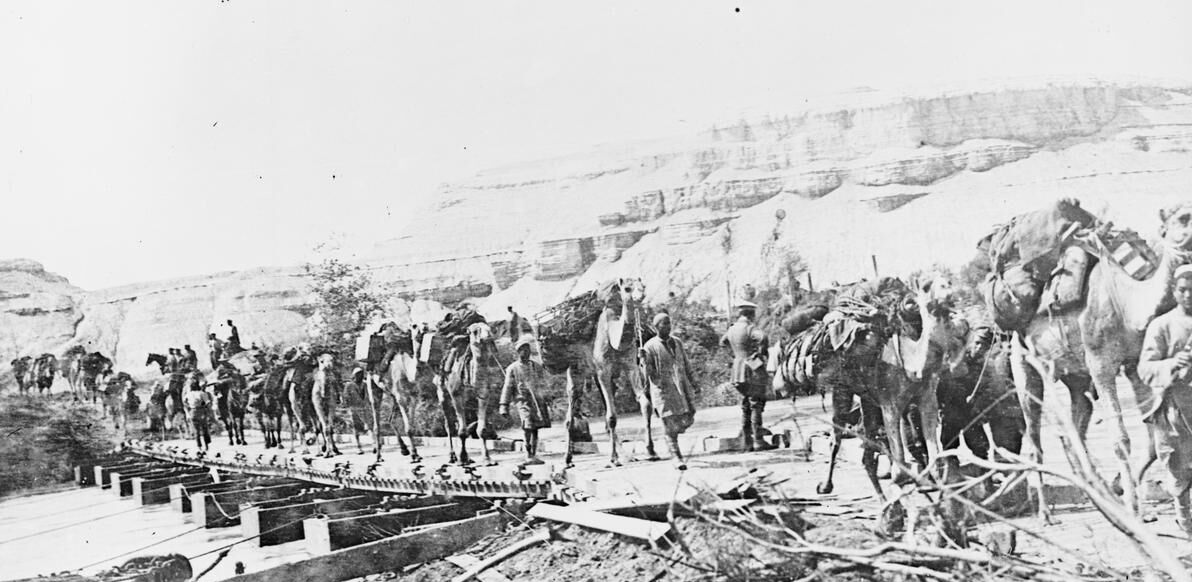
Egyptian Camel Transport Corps crossing pontoon bridge at Ghoraniyeh March 1918

Motor lorries supplied Jericho from Jerusalem but from Jericho to Amman the Anzac Mounted Divisional Train and Egyptian Camel Transport Corps transported supplies on camels and pack horses, mules or donkeys. They covered 24 miles (39 km) a day from the foot of the mountains to the troops at Amman with the severe weather and slippery mountain tracks causing many casualties to camels and drivers. The total distance covered by lorries, horses and camels, from railhead to Jerusalem and on to the men in the firing line, was 86 miles (138 km).

Of the 2,000 camels used on convoy duties 100 were killed in action and 92 had to be destroyed because of injuries received during the operations. During the retreat from Amman many of the camels had been overloaded.

== Aftermath ==
=== Retreat 31 March – 2 April ===
It was, in its way, one of the most daring exploits of the war. A weak division, aided by Australian mounted troops, crossed the Jordan and, cut off from the rest of our army, went clean through the Turks for a distance of forty miles, cut the railway and returned with all their wounded and hundreds of prisoners [but their dead had to be left behind]. Their jumping–off point was a thousand feet below sea level, the railway was four thousand feet above them. There were no roads through the mountains and it rained almost the whole time. They got there in forty–eight hours. When they reached Es Salt the inhabitants turned out en bloc to greet them, standing on the roofs of their houses and loosing off rifles into the air.

— N. C. Sommers Down (Lieutenant/Captain Gordon Highlanders); 15 May 1918 diary entry during convalescence when he shared a tent with another officer wounded in the 'romantic Amman stunt' about which there was 'too little in the papers'.

By 30 March Chaytor's force had pushed infantry in the Ottoman 48th Division back into Amman and after desperate fighting the New Zealand Mounted Rifles Brigade had entered the town 2 miles (3.2 km) west of the station, but German and Ottoman machine guns positioned on the hills beyond were too strong and all efforts to dislodge enemy forces from the Hejaz Railway's Amman station failed.

It was considered that any further attempts to capture the Amman Railway Station would incur unacceptable losses and the decision to withdraw was therefore made. Allenby reported to the War Office on 31 March that 5 miles (8.0 km) of railway track and culverts had been destroyed south of Amman Station and a bridge blown up, and that the object of the raid had been achieved by cutting the Hejaz Railway. He took this decision despite the principal objective of destroying the large viaduct at Amman, had not been achieved. But it was increasingly less likely that it could be as Chaytor's force began to have difficulty defending itself from strong German and Ottoman counter-attacks. Chaytor's force was therefore ordered to withdraw to Es Salt.

When darkness fell on 30 March, the front line troops received the order to retreat and an infantryman concluded: "none of us sorry to leave behind forever, we hope, a nightmare of a most terrible nature." (Note: It has been suggests the reasons why the British units decided to withdraw from Amman on 31 March were unclear; that the reason given, that substantial Ottoman reserves had been brought up was, "not at all true" and that the abandonment of this important objective is "not easily explained." [Erickson 2001, p. 195 and Erickson 2007, pp. 130–1])

==== Evacuation of wounded ====
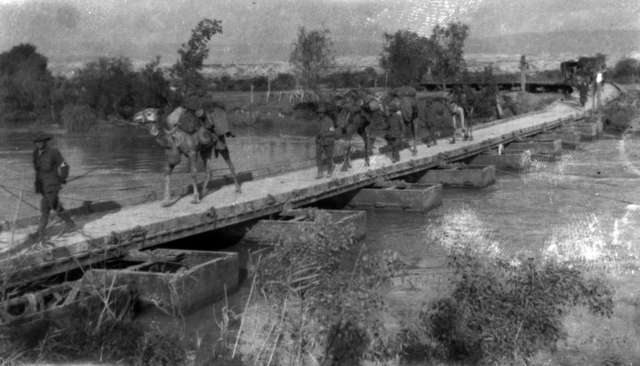
2nd Light Horse Field Ambulance crossing the Jordan River at Ghoraniyeh on their return

The retirement from Amman started on 30 March with the wounded beginning to be sent back to the Jordan Valley. The wounded moved along the main road via Es Salt, but Es Salt was under attack from German and Ottoman units from the north west (the direction of the road from Nablus via Jisr ed Damieh) and the only bridge across the Jordan River not destroyed by a 9 feet (2.7 m) flood was at Ghoraniyeh.

By 31 March there were over 240 wounded in the divisional collecting stations such as Birket umm Amud 10.5 miles (16.9 km) from the front line. All available means including sand carts sent by infantry in the 60th (London) Division, were employed and these wounded were on their way by the evening; about 50 of them walking. The last convoy of wounded which left Amman at 23:00 found 20 camels carrying wounded which had begun their journey six hours earlier, bogged and exhausted at Suweileh. Nine of them were unable to move and ambulance personnel were left to attend to the wounded throughout the night. By daylight, light horse troopers warned them that the Ottoman cavalry was close. Five camels managed to continue but the remaining four were too exhausted. Of the eight wounded, six were placed on horses, but two who appeared to be mortally wounded were left behind when Ottoman cavalry got between the covering party and the ambulance men and began firing on the group. All escaped but the two seriously wounded and three men of the 2nd Light Horse Field Ambulance mounted on donkeys who were taken prisoner. Only one of these men survived to the end of the war; the other two dying in captivity. (Note: It is not known what happened to the bodies of Australian light horsemen, British infantry and New Zealand riflemen who died during the attack on Amman. During the withdrawal following the 2nd Transjordan attack at the end of April, just a few weeks later, the infantry dead from the 60th (London) Division were removed in wagons for burial.[Woodward 2006 p. 179])

==== Refugees ====
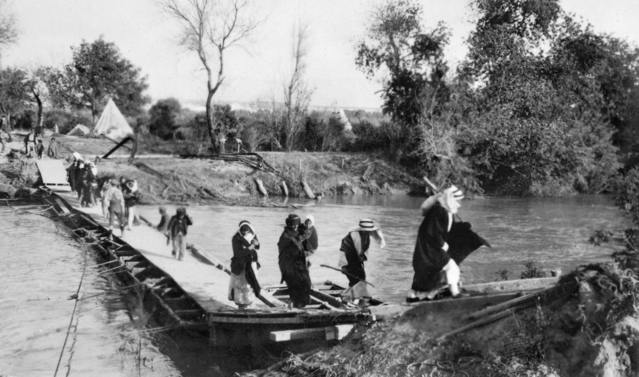
Bedouin refugees from Es Salt crossing a pontoon bridge over the Jordan River

From Es Salt, thousands of Armenian and Bedouin refugees and others joined the withdrawing columns carrying their belongings on their backs or pushing them in carts, some of the aged and footsore given a lift in the horse-drawn limber wagons.

==== Withdrawal ====
The front lines were still engaged when the withdrawal began. It was necessary, firstly to move the New Zealand Mounted Rifles Brigade back from Hill 3039, across the Wadi Amman. They received their orders at 18:00 to withdraw to the cross road at the western end of the plateau just above the village of Ain es Sir. By 23:00 all wounded had been started on their journey back to the Jordan Valley and the New Zealand Mounted Rifles Brigade commenced to recross the Wadi Amman at midnight; reaching the cross roads at 04:00 on 31 March.

An outpost line was set up across the country between Ain es Sir and Amman and the whole day was spent in concentrating Chaytor's and Shea's force – mounted troops, infantry, camels and camel transport; and in getting all camels, both camel brigade and Egyptian Camel Transport Corps down the mountains. The 2nd Light Horse Brigade and the Somerset Battery took the Es Salt road while the remainder of the force, including the infantry, withdrew by the Wadi Es Sir track, up which the New Zealand Brigade had advanced.

All day long and all the next night a long line of weary camels, horses and men slowly stumbled, slipped and fell, down the mountain track which descends some 4,000 feet (1,200 m) in 8 miles (13 km). It was well after daylight on the morning of 1 April, before the New Zealand Mounted Rifles Brigade; the rearguard was able to start retiring again, while being fully occupied in holding off advanced German and Ottoman troops.

The Wellington Mounted Rifles Regiment had regained its 6th Squadron which had been detached to the infantry division; the 60th (London) Division, and was ordered to cover the rear of the New Zealand Mounted Rifles Brigade. German and Ottomans attacks on this rearguard were held off until the regiment filed down through the village of Ain es Sir.

At 07:45 on 1 April as the rearguard of Wellington Mounted Rifles Regiment passed through the village the 2nd (Wellington West Coast) Squadron was attacked by Circassians who suddenly opened fire from a mill and adjacent caves, from houses and from behind rocks on the nearby hills. Firing at very close range with a variety of firearms they wounded men and horses; horses rearing up, bolted, screaming joined the numerous riderless horses galloping across the hillsides. Remnants of the 2nd Squadron galloped clear of the village, dismounted and counter-attacked with the other two squadrons attacking from the ridges above the village. (Note: While fighting on foot, one quarter of the riflemen were holding the horses; a brigade would then be equivalent in rifle strength to an infantry battalion. [Preston 1921 p.168]) They rushed the mill and its occupants were killed. No prisoners were taken; the 2nd Squadron suffered 18 casualties.

About 13:00 the Jordan Valley came into sight and a halt was made to distribute rations and forage which had been brought forward to meet the New Zealanders. The sun came out and the wind died away and an hour later they were riding down through flowers up to the horses' knees. All was peace and warmth and quiet, making it difficult to think that a few short hours before, the winds were raging, rain falling, and a bitter battle in progress.

— C. Guy Powles, Assistant Adjutant and Quartermaster General, Anzac Mounted Division

=== Return to the Jordan ===
The withdrawal across the Jordan River was completed by the evening of 2 April leaving bridgeheads at Ghoraniye and Makhadet Hajlah. The infantry and mounted forces had marched and fought almost continuously in the mud and rain for ten days and had suffered almost as much in both the advance and retreat. Shea's force had expended 587,338 rounds of small-arms ammunition (SAA), brought back four field guns, 700 prisoners including 20 officers and 595 other ranks along with 10 machine guns two automatic rifles, 207 rifles and 248,000 rounds of SAA. (Note: There may have been as many as 1,000 prisoners captured and brought back to the Jordan Valley. [Wavell 1968 p. 182]) The German and Ottoman forces abandoned two travelling field cookers, 26 motor lorries, five motor cars and many horse-drawn wagons on the Amman road and an Ottoman aircraft was captured on the Hejaz railway.

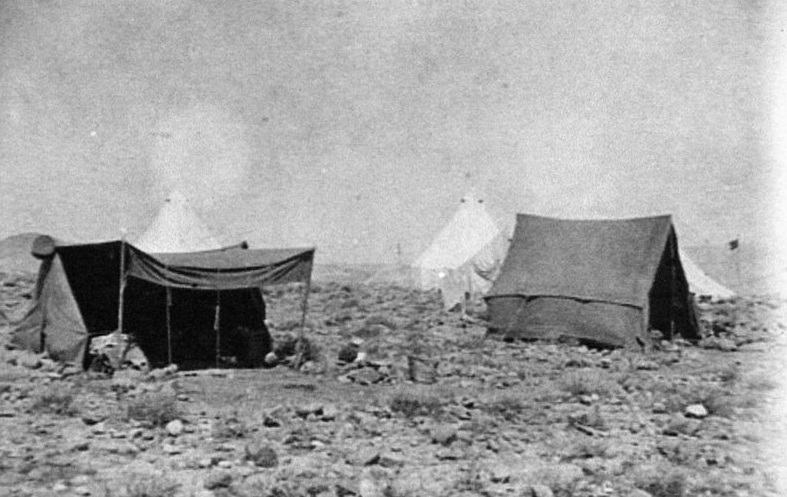
Officers' bivouacs, headquarters Anzac Mounted Division at Talat ed Dumm

Asim launched a pursuit of the British by the 24th Assault Company with the 8th and 9th Cavalry Regiment (3rd Cavalry Division) and on 4 April German and Ottoman counterattacks by the 24th Assault Company, infantry in the 24th Division's 3rd Battalion and the 145th Infantry Regiment, began. After another unsuccessful counterattack by the Ottoman Army on 11 April they began to consolidate their positions. About this time the Ottoman Seventh Army formed a provisional cavalry regiment by combining the cavalry companies which had previously been attached to several infantry divisions; these were the 11th, 24th, 48th and 53rd Divisions.

Designed to be a surprise raid by mounted troops, the movements of Shea's force in the difficult terrain and weather, had proved to be too slow and restricted and the element of surprise was lost. The attack did, however, force the recall of a German and Ottoman expedition to Tafileh; attempts to maintain a permanent garrison there, were abandoned.

The strong incursion by Shea's and Chaytor's forces materially helped Feisal's force; the Ottoman 4th Army withdrew part of its garrison from Maan to help defend Amman just as Feisal began his attack there. These major troop movements; the recall of the Tafileh expedition and the partial withdrawal from Maan, helped strengthen the operations of Feisal's Arabs and the threat to the Ottoman lines of communication east of the Jordan, compelling the Ottoman army to make a permanent increase to their forces in this area. (Note: These increased numbers of troops stationed east of the Jordan were made at the expense of Ottoman forces on the Mediterranean coastal plain. [Bruce 2002 p. 196])

Large new Ottoman camps were established to support the growing lower Jordan defences which included a large garrison at Shunet Nimrin. These troops moved from Nablus by the Jenin railway and then by road down the Wady Fara to the Jisr ed Damieh, where the ford was replaced by a pontoon bridge. It remained an important line of communication between the 7th Army at Nablus in the west and the 4th Army in the eastern sector.

For the first time since the Second Battle of Gaza in April 1917, the Egyptian Expeditionary Force had been defeated; both Shea and Chetwode had opposed the attack on Amman at that time of year, believing the attacking force to be too small. Nevertheless, a second unsuccessful assault by one infantry and two mounted divisions, into the hills of Moab to Es Salt followed just a few weeks later at the end of April. It has been suggested that these two unsuccessful operations convinced the Ottoman Army to expect more attacks to be made in the same area by the same troops, while the breakthrough attack in September 1918 occurred on the Mediterranean coast. (Note: The third Transjordan attack by Chaytor's force succeeded in capturing Amman a few days after Allenby launched Megiddo.)

== Notes ==
Footnotes

Citations

== Bibliography ==
- "1st Light Horse Brigade War Diary". First World War Diaries AWM4, 10-1-44, 45. Canberra: Australian War Memorial. March–April 1918.
- "Auckland Mounted Rifles Regiment War Diary". First World War Diaries AWM4, 35-2-34. Canberra: Australian War Memorial. March 1918. Archived from the original on 19 April 2012.
- "New Zealand Mounted Rifles Brigade Headquarters War Diary". First World War Diaries AWM4, 35-1-35. Canberra: Australian War Memorial. March 1918. Archived from the original on 19 April 2012.
- Allenby, E. H. H.; H. Pirie-Gordon; Army of Great Britain; Egyptian Expeditionary Force (1919). A Brief Record of the Advance of the Egyptian Expeditionary Force under the command of General Sir Edmund H.H. Allenby, GCB, GCMG July 1917 to October 1918 compiled from Official Sources (2 ed.). London: H.M. Stationery Office. OCLC 17017063.
- Baly, Lindsay (2003). Horseman, Pass By: The Australian Light Horse in World War I. East Roseville, Sydney: Simon & Schuster. OCLC 223425266.
- Berrie, George (1949). Morale: A Story of Australian Light Horsemen. Sydney: Holland & Stephenson. OCLC 6273740.
- Blenkinsop, Layton John; Rainey, John Wakefield, eds. (1925). History of the Great War Based on Official Documents Veterinary Services. London: H.M. Stationers. OCLC 460717714.
- Bou, Jean (2009). Light Horse: A History of Australia's Mounted Arm. Australian Army History. Port Melbourne: Cambridge University Press. ISBN 978-0-521-19708-3.
- Bruce, Anthony (2002). The Last Crusade: The Palestine Campaign in the First World War. London: John Murray. ISBN 978-0-7195-5432-2.
- Dennis, Peter; Grey, Jeffrey; Morris, Ewan; Prior, Robin; Bou, Jean (2008). The Oxford Companion to Australian Military History (2nd ed.). Melbourne: Oxford University Press, Australia & New Zealand. OCLC 489040963.
- Cutlack, Frederic Morley (1941). The Australian Flying Corps in the Western and Eastern Theatres of War, 1914–1918. Official History of Australia in the War of 1914–1918. Vol. VIII (11th ed.). Canberra: Australian War Memorial. OCLC 220900299.
- Downes, Rupert M. (1938). "The Campaign in Sinai and Palestine". In Butler, Arthur Graham (ed.). Gallipoli, Palestine and New Guinea. Official History of the Australian Army Medical Services, 1914–1918: Volume 1 Part II (2nd ed.). Canberra: Australian War Memorial. pp. 547–780. OCLC 220879097.
- Erickson, Edward J. (2001). Ordered to Die: A History of the Ottoman Army in the First World War: Forward by General Hüseyiln Kivrikoglu. No. 201 Contributions in Military Studies. Westport Connecticut: Greenwood Press. OCLC 43481698.
- Erickson, Edward J. (2007). Gooch, John; Reid, Brian Holden (eds.). Ottoman Army Effectiveness in World War I: A Comparative Study. No. 26 of Cass Series: Military History and Policy. Milton Park, Abingdon, Oxon: Routledge. ISBN 978-0-203-96456-9.
- Falls, Cyril (1930). Military Operations Egypt & Palestine from June 1917 to the End of the War. Official History of the Great War Based on Official Documents by Direction of the Historical Section of the Committee of Imperial Defence: Volume 2 Part II. Maps by A. F. Becke. London: H.M. Stationery Office. OCLC 256950972.
- G.S.(I.), Egyptian Expeditionary Force (1918). Handbook on Northern Palestine and Southern Syria (1st provisional 9 April 1918 ed.). Cairo: Government Press. OCLC 23101324.
- Great Britain; Battles Nomenclature Committee (1922). The Official Names of the Battles and Other Engagements Fought by the Military Forces of the British Empire during the Great War, 1914–1919, and the Third Afghan War, 1919: Report of the Battles Nomenclature Committee as Approved by The Army Council Presented to Parliament by Command of His Majesty. London: Government Printer. OCLC 29078007.
- Gullett, Henry S. (1941). The Australian Imperial Force in Sinai and Palestine, 1914–1918. Official History of Australia in the War of 1914–1918. Vol. VII (11th ed.). Canberra: Australian War Memorial. OCLC 220900153.
- Hall, Rex (1975). The Desert Hath Pearls. Melbourne: Hawthorn Press. OCLC 677016516.
- Hill, Alec Jeffrey (1978). Chauvel of the Light Horse: A Biography of General Sir Harry Chauvel, GCMG, KCB. Melbourne: Melbourne University Press. OCLC 5003626.
- Hughes, Matthew (1999). John Gooch; Brian Holden Reid (eds.). Allenby and British Strategy in the Middle East 1917–1919. Cass Series: Military History and Policy Series No. 1. London: Frank Cass. OCLC 40891042.
- Hughes, Matthew, ed. (2004). Allenby in Palestine: The Middle East Correspondence of Field Marshal Viscount Allenby June 1917 – October 1919. Army Records Society. Vol. 22. Phoenix Mill, Thrupp, Stroud, Gloucestershire: Sutton Publishing. ISBN 978-0-7509-3841-9.
- Keogh, E. G.; Joan Graham (1955). Suez to Aleppo. Melbourne: Directorate of Military Training by Wilkie & Co. OCLC 220029983.
- Kinloch, Terry (2007). Devils on Horses: In the Words of the Anzacs in the Middle East, 1916–19. Auckland: Exisle Publishing. ISBN 978-0-908988-94-5.
- Mitchell, Elyne (1978). Light Horse The Story of Australia's Mounted Troops. Victor Ambrus (illus.). Melbourne: Macmillan. OCLC 5288180.
- Moore, A. Briscoe (1920). The Mounted Riflemen in Sinai & Palestine: The Story of New Zealand's Crusaders. Christchurch: Whitcombe & Tombs. OCLC 561949575.
- Powles, C. Guy; A. Wilkie (1922). The New Zealanders in Sinai and Palestine. Official History New Zealand's Effort in the Great War. Vol. III. Auckland: Whitcombe & Tombs. OCLC 2959465.
- Pugsley, Christoper (2004). The Anzac Experience New Zealand, Australia and Empire in the First World War. Auckland: Reed Books. ISBN 978-0-7900-0941-4.
- Robertson, John (1938). With the Cameliers in Palestine. Dunedin: Reed Publishing. OCLC 35129262.
- Scrymgeour, James Tindal Steuart (1961). Blue Eyes: A True Romance of the Desert Column. Infracombe: Arthur H. Stockwell. OCLC 220903073.
- Sommers, Cecil (Norman Cecil Sommers Down Lieut./Captain Gordon Highlanders) (1919). Temporary Crusaders. London: John Lane, The Bodley Head. OCLC 6825340.
- Wavell, Field Marshal Earl (1968) [1933]. "The Palestine Campaigns". In Sheppard, Eric William (ed.). A Short History of the British Army (4th ed.). London: Constable & Co. OCLC 35621223.
- Woodward, David R. (2006). Hell in the Holy Land: World War I in the Middle East. Lexington: The University Press of Kentucky. ISBN 978-0-8131-2383-7.
