= Muhittin Akyüz =

Military officer, diplomat

Muhittin Akyüz 1304-P. 38
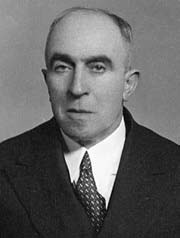
- Born: 1870; Istanbul, Ottoman Empire
- Died: 11 November 1940 (aged 69–70); Ankara, Turkey
- Burial place: Cebeci Askerî Şehitliği
- Military career
- Allegiance: Ottoman Empire; Turkey
- Branch: Ottoman Army; Turkish Land Forces
- Service years: Ottoman Empire: 1888–1919; Turkey: 9 September 1921 – 24 September 1928
- Rank: Major general
- Commands: Asir Division, Hejaz Corps; Kastamonu Area Command, Adana Area Command
- Conflicts: Balkan Wars; First World War; Turkish War of Independence; Battle of Al Zakhran against the Bani Shahr tribe
- Other work: Ambassador to Iran; Ambassador to Egypt

Muhittin Akyüz (1870 – 11 November 1940), known as Muhiddin Pasha until 1934, was a Turkish military officer and diplomat. He served for both the Ottoman Army and the Turkish Army. He fought in the Gallipoli campaign during World War I where he helped defend the Gallipoli peninsula against Anglo-French attacks. He later joined the forces of Mustafa Kemal and fought in the Turkish War of Independence.

== Medals and decorations ==
- War Medal
- Silver Medal of Liyaqat
- Silver Medal of Imtiyaz
- Medal of Independence with Red Ribbon

== See also ==
- List of high-ranking commanders of the Turkish War of Independence
