= Hejaz Corps (Ottoman Empire) =

Hejaz Corps Hicaz Kolordusu
- Active: December 1916–February 8, 1919
- Country: Ottoman Empire
- Type: Corps
- Garrison/HQ: 'Asir
- Engagements: Arab Revolt (World War I)

Commanders
- Notable commanders: Mirliva Muhiddin Pasha (December 1916–February 8, 1919)

The Hejaz Corps or Hejaz Group of the Ottoman Empire (Turkish: Hicaz Kolordusu) was one of the corps of the Ottoman Army. It was formed during World War I.

== Formations ==
=== Order of Battle, January, June 1918 ===
In January, June 1918, the corps was structured as follows:

- Hejaz Corps ('Asir)
  - 58th Division
  - Provisional Infantry Divisions x 3
