= XII Corps (Ottoman Empire) =

XII Corps On İkinci Kolordu
- Active: 1911–
- Country: Ottoman Empire
- Type: Corps
- Garrison/HQ: Musul
- Patron: Sultans of the Ottoman Empire

Commanders
- Notable commanders: Miralay Fahrettin Bey; Mirliva Remzi Pasha; Abdülkerim Pasha; Miralay Fahrettin Bey (May 7, 1918-April 12, 1919)

The XII Corps of the Ottoman Empire (Turkish: 12 nci Kolordu or On İkinci Kolordu) was one of the corps of the Ottoman Army. It was formed in the early 20th century during Ottoman military reforms.

== Formation ==
=== Order of battle, 1911 ===
With further reorganizations of the Ottoman Army, to include the creation of corps level headquarters, by 1911 the XI Corps was headquartered in Musul. The Corps before the First Balkan War in 1911 was structured as such:

- XII Corps, Musul
  - 35th Infantry Division, Musul
    - 103rd Infantry Regiment, Revandiz
    - 104th Infantry Regiment, Musul
    - 105th Infantry Regiment, Musul
    - 35th Rifle Battalion, Musul
    - 35th Field Artillery Regiment, Musul
    - 35th Division Band, Musul
  - 36th Infantry Division, Kerkük
    - 106th Infantry Regiment, Kerkük
    - 107th Infantry Regiment, Kerkük
    - 108th Infantry Regiment, Süleymaniye
    - 36th Rifle Battalion, Kerkük
    - 36th Division Band, Kerkük
- Units of XII Corps
- 13th Cavalry Brigade, Kerkük
  - 33rd Cavalry Regiment, Kerkük
  - 34th Cavalry Regiment, Kerkük
  - 35th Cavalry Regiment, Kerkük
- Border companies x 8

== World War I ==
=== Order of battle, August 1914 ===
In August 1914, the corps was structured as follows:

- XII Corps (Mesopotamia)
  - 35th Division, 36th Division

=== Order of battle, November 1914 ===
In November 1914, the corps was structured as follows:

- XII Corps (Syria)
  - 35th Division, 36th Division

=== Order of battle, late April 1915 ===
In late April 1915, the corps was structured as follows:

- XII Corps (Syria)
  - 38th Division

=== Order of battle, late summer 1915, January 1916 ===
In late summer 1915, January 1916, the corps was structured as follows:

- XII Corps (Syria-Palestine)
  - 41st Division, 42nd Division, 46th Division

=== Order of battle, August 1916, December 1916 ===
In August 1916, December 1916, the corps was structured as follows:

- XII Corps (Syria-Palestine)
  - 41st Division, 42nd Division, 43rd Division, 46th Division

=== Order of battle, August 1917 ===
In August 1917, the corps was structured as follows:

- XII Corps (Syria-Palestine)
  - 3rd Division, 7th Division, 53rd Division

=== Order of battle, January 1918 ===
In January 1918, the corps was structured as follows:

- XII Corps (Syria)
  - 3rd Division, 7th Division, 20th Division

=== Order of battle, June 1918 ===
In June 1918, the corps was structured as follows:

- XII Corps (Palestine)
  - 3rd Division, 7th Division, 20th Division

=== Order of battle, September 1918 ===
In September 1918, the corps was structured as follows:

- XII Corps (Anatolia)
  - 23rd Division

== After Mudros ==
=== Order of battle, November 1918 ===
In November 1918, the corps was structured as follows:

- XII Corps (Syria)
  - 23rd Division

=== Order of battle, January 1919 ===
In January 1919, the corps was structured as follows:

- XII Corps (Anatolia, Konya)
  - 11th Division (Niğde)
    - 12th Infantry Regiment, 33rd Infantry Regiment, 127th Infantry Regiment
  - 41st Division (Karaman)
    - 131st Infantry Regiment, 132nd Infantry Regiment, 139th Infantry Regiment
  - 7th Cavalry Regiment
  - 20th Cavalry Regiment
