= Cemal Mersinli =

Turkish politician

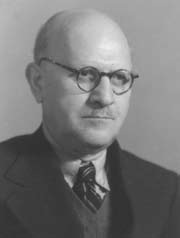
- Born: 1875; Mersin, Ottoman Empire
- Died: 7 October 1941 (aged 65–66); Ankara, Turkey
- Burial place: Cebeci Askerî Şehitliği
- Military career
- Allegiance: Ottoman Empire; Turkey
- Service years: Ottoman Empire: March 13, 1895-March 22, 1920; Turkey: -May 6, 1924
- Rank: Lieutenant general
- Commands: Chief of Staff of the Second Army, Chief of Staff of the Western Army, 42nd Division, 10th Division, Chief of Staff of the Inspectorate of the First Army, Vice commander of the Adrianople Fortified Area Command, VIII Corps, Fourth Army, Yildirim Troops Inspectorate, Second Army, General Director of Military Schools, War Minister
- Conflicts: Balkan Wars; First World War; War of Independence
- Other work: Member of the GNAT (Isparta); Member of the GNAT (İçel)

Cemal Mersinli (1875 – October 7, 1941), also known as Mehmed Djemal Pasha (Turkish: Mehmed Cemal Paşa), Cemal of Mersin (Turkish: Mersinli Cemal), or Djemal Pasha the Lesser (Turkish: Küçük Cemal Paşa; to distinguish him from the higher-ranking Djemal Pasha) was a Turkish general of the Ottoman and Turkish armies and a politician in the Ottoman Empire and the Republic of Turkey.

During the Arab Revolt, he led Turkish forces in an attack on Wadi Musa on 21 October 1917. The Turkish forces were defeated by forces under the command of Mawlud Mukhlis, Faisal's aide-de-camp. He later participated in the Turkish War of Independence where he joined the forces of Atatürk. He was a prominent politician of the Turkish Republic until his death in 1941.

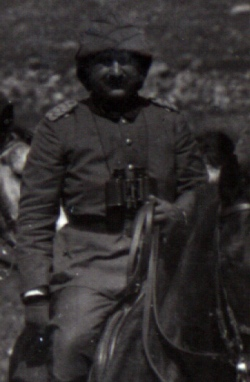
Cemal Mersinli during World War I

== Medals and decorations ==
- Medal of Independence with Green Ribbon.
