= 27th Infantry Division (Ottoman Empire) =

The 27th Division was a formation of the VIII Corps of the Ottoman Army based in Haifa. It had been intended that its manpower would be raised from locally recruited Syrians and Arabs.

The division was composed of the 27th Artillery Regiment, and two infantry regiments the 80th and 81st. In the 80th regiment there was an battalion of Azazima Bedouins from Negev.
