= VIII Corps (Ottoman Empire) =

VIII Corps Sekizinci Kolordu
- Active: 1911–
- Country: Ottoman Empire
- Type: Corps
- Garrison/HQ: Damascus
- Patron: Ottoman Sultan

Commanders
- Notable commanders: Miralay Mersinli Cemal Bey; Miralay Ali Fuat Bey; Miralay Yasin Hilmi Bey; Miralay Selâhattin Bey; Miralay Ali İhsan Sâbis; Friedrich Freiherr Kress von Kressenstein

The VIII Corps of the Ottoman Empire (Turkish: 8 nci Kolordu or Sekizinci Kolordu) was one of the corps of the Ottoman Army. It was formed in the early 20th century as part of the Ottoman military reforms.

== Formation ==
=== Order of Battle, 1911 ===
With further reorganizations of the Ottoman Army, to include the creation of corps level headquarters, by 1911 the VIII Corps was headquartered in Damascus. The Corps before the First Balkan War in 1911 was structured as such:

- VIII Corps, Damascus
  - 25th Division, Dera
    - 73rd Infantry Regiment, Dera
    - 74th Infantry Regiment, Suveydiye
    - 75th Infantry Regiment, Kerek
    - 25th Rifle Battalion, Maan
    - 25th Division Band, Dera
  - 26th Division, Halep
    - 76th Infantry Regiment, Halep
    - 77th Infantry Regiment, Maraş
    - 78th Infantry Regiment, Adana
    - 26th Rifle Battalion, Halep
    - 26th Field Artillery Regiment, Halep
    - 26th Division Band, Halep
  - 27th Division, Beyrut
    - 79th Infantry Regiment, Hayfa
    - 80th Infantry Regiment, Beyrut
    - 81st Infantry Regiment, Kudüs
    - 27th Rifle Battalion, Mesiha
    - 27th Division Band, Beyrut
- Units of VIII Corps
- 8th Rifle Regiment, Damascus
- 9th Cavalry Brigade, Damascus
  - 28th Cavalry Regiment, Dera
  - 29th Cavalry Regiment, Amman
  - 30th Cavalry Regiment, Damascus
- 2nd Mountain Artillery Battalion, Damascus
- 8th Mountain Artillery Battalion, Damascus
- 6th Engineer Battalion, Humus
- 6th Transport Battalion, Damascus
- Railroad Regiment, Medina

== Balkan Wars ==
=== Order of Battle, 19 October 1912 ===
On 19 October 1912, the VIII Provisional Corps was placed under the Western Army and faced the Greek Army of Thessaly. Its composition was as follows:

- 22nd Regular (Nizamiye) Division
- Nasliç Reserve (Redif) Division
- Aydın Reserve (Redif) Division

=== Order of Battle, July 1913 ===
- VIII Corps (Syria)
  - 25th Division, 26th Division

== World War I ==
=== Order of Battle, August 1914 ===
In August 1914, the corps was structured as follows:

- VIII Corps (Syria)
  - 25th Division, 27th Division

=== Order of Battle, November 1914 ===
In November 1914, the corps was structured as follows:

- VIII Corps (Syria)
  - 23rd Division, 25th Division, 27th Division

=== Order of Battle, Late April 1915 ===
In Late April 1915, the corps was structured as follows:

- VIII Corps (Syria)
  - 8th Division, 10th Division, 23rd Division, 25th Division, 27th Division

=== Order of Battle, Late Summer 1915, January 1916 ===
In Late Summer 1915, January 1916, the corps was structured as follows:

- VIII Corps (Syria-Palestine)
  - 23rd Division, 24th Division, 27th Division

=== Order of Battle, August 1916, December 1916 ===
In August 1916, December 1916, the corps was structured as follows:

- VIII Corps (Syria-Palestine)
  - 3rd Division, 23rd Division, 24th Division, 27th Division

=== Order of Battle, August 1917 ===
In August 1917, the corps was structured as follows:

- VIII Corps (Syria)
  - 48th Division

=== Order of Battle, January 1918, June 1918 ===
In January 1918, the corps was structured as follows:

- VIII Corps (Syria)
  - 43rd Division, 48th Division

=== Order of Battle, January 1918, June 1918 ===
In June 1918, the corps was structured as follows:

- VIII Corps (Palestine)
  - 43rd Division, 48th Division

=== Order of Battle, September 1918 ===
In September 1918, the corps was structured as follows:

- VIII Corps (Palestine)
  - 48th Division, Provisional Infantry Division
