= 23rd Infantry Division (Ottoman Empire) =

The 23rd Division was a formation of the VIII Corps of the Ottoman Army based in Homs. It had been intended that its manpower would be raised from locally recruited Syrians and Arabs.

The division was composed of two infantry regiments the 68th and 69th.
