= Chataldja Army =

- Active: November 7, 1912-
- Country: Ottoman Empire
- Type: Field Army
- Patron: Sultans of the Ottoman Empire
- Engagements: First Battle at Chataldja; Second Battle at Chataldja; Advance to Adrianople

Commanders
- Notable commanders: Birinci Ferik Nazim Pasha; Ferik Ahmed Abuk Pasha; Ferik Ahmed Izzet Pasha

The Chataldja Army or Çatalca Army of the Ottoman Empire (Turkish: Çatalca Ordusu) was one of the field armies of the Ottoman Army. It was formed after the Ottoman retreat to the Chataldja line during the First Balkan War. It confronted Bulgarian forces. It was organized from units of the dissolved First Eastern Army and Second Eastern Army on November 7, 1912.

== First Balkan War ==
=== November 17, 1912 ===
On November 17, 1912, the army was structured as follows:

- I Corps (Commander: Ferik Ömer Yaver Pasha)
  - 2nd Division, 3rd Division
  - South Wing Detachment
- I Provisional Reserve Corps (Ferik Abuk Ahmed Pasha)
  - 29th Division,
  - Ergli Redif Division, Kayseri Redif Division
- II Corps (Commander: Ferik Hamdi Pasha)
  - 4th Division, 5th Division, 12th Division
  - South Wing Detachment
- II Provisional Reserve Corps (Commander: Mirliva Çürüksulu Mahmud Pasha)
  - 30th Division
  - Amasya Redif Division, Yozgat Redif Division, Samsun Redif Division
- III Corps (Commander: Ferik Mahmud Muhtar Pasha)
  - 7th Division, 8th Division, 9th Division
  - South Wing Detachment
- III Provisional Reserve Corps (Ferik Izzet Fuad Pasha)
  - Selimiye Redif Division, Fatih Redif Division, Afyon Redif Division
- Chataldja Fortified Area and Artillery Command (Mirliva Ali Riza Pasha)
- Right Wing Artillery Area Command
- Center Area Artillery Command
- Left Wing Artillery Area Command
- Independent Cavalry Brigade

=== Order of Battle, March 25, 1913 ===
On March 25, 1913, the army was structured as follows:

- Left Wing
  - X Corps
    - 4th Division, 31st Division
    - Amasya Redif Division
    - Independent Cavalry Brigade
  - I Corps
    - 2nd Division
    - Fatih Redif Division
- III Provisional Reserve Corps
  - 3rd Division
  - Yozgat Redif Division
- II Corps
  - 5th Division, 12th Division
  - Ankara Redif Division
- III Corps
  - 7th Division, 8th Division, 9th Division
- I Provisional Reserve Corps
  - 29th Division
  - Ereğli Redif Division, Kayseri Redif Division
- II Provisional Reserve Corps
  - Selimiye Redif Division, Aydın Redif Division, Samsun Redif Division
- Mamuretülaziz Redif Division (From Gallipoli)
- Chataldja Fortified Area and Artillery Command
- Right Wing Artillery Area Command
- Center Area Artillery Command
- Left Wing Artillery Area Command

== Second Balkan War ==
=== July 12, 1913 ===
On July 12, 1913, the army was structured as follows:

- Left Wing (Commander: Hurşit Pasha)
  - X Corps
    - 4th Division, 31st Division
    - Mamuretülaziz Redif Division
  - I Corps
    - 2nd Division, 28th Division
    - Fatih Redif Division
- II Corps (Commander: Hasan Izzet Pasha)
  - 3rd Division, 5th Division, 12th Division
  - 10th Cavalry Regiment
- Right Wing (Commander: Ahmed Abuk Pasha)
  - III Corps
    - 7th Division, 8th Division, 9th Division
    - 8th Cavalry Regiment
  - Provisional IV Corps
    - 29th Division
    - Aydın Redif Division, Ereğli Redif Division, Kayseri Redif Division
    - 2nd Cavalry Regiment
- Army Control
  - Ankara Redif Division, Amasya Redif Division, Selimiye Redif Division, Yozgat Redif Division
  - Independent Cavalry Brigade
  - Tribal Cavalry Brigade
  - Heavy Artillery Regiment
