= Fifth Army (Ottoman Empire) =

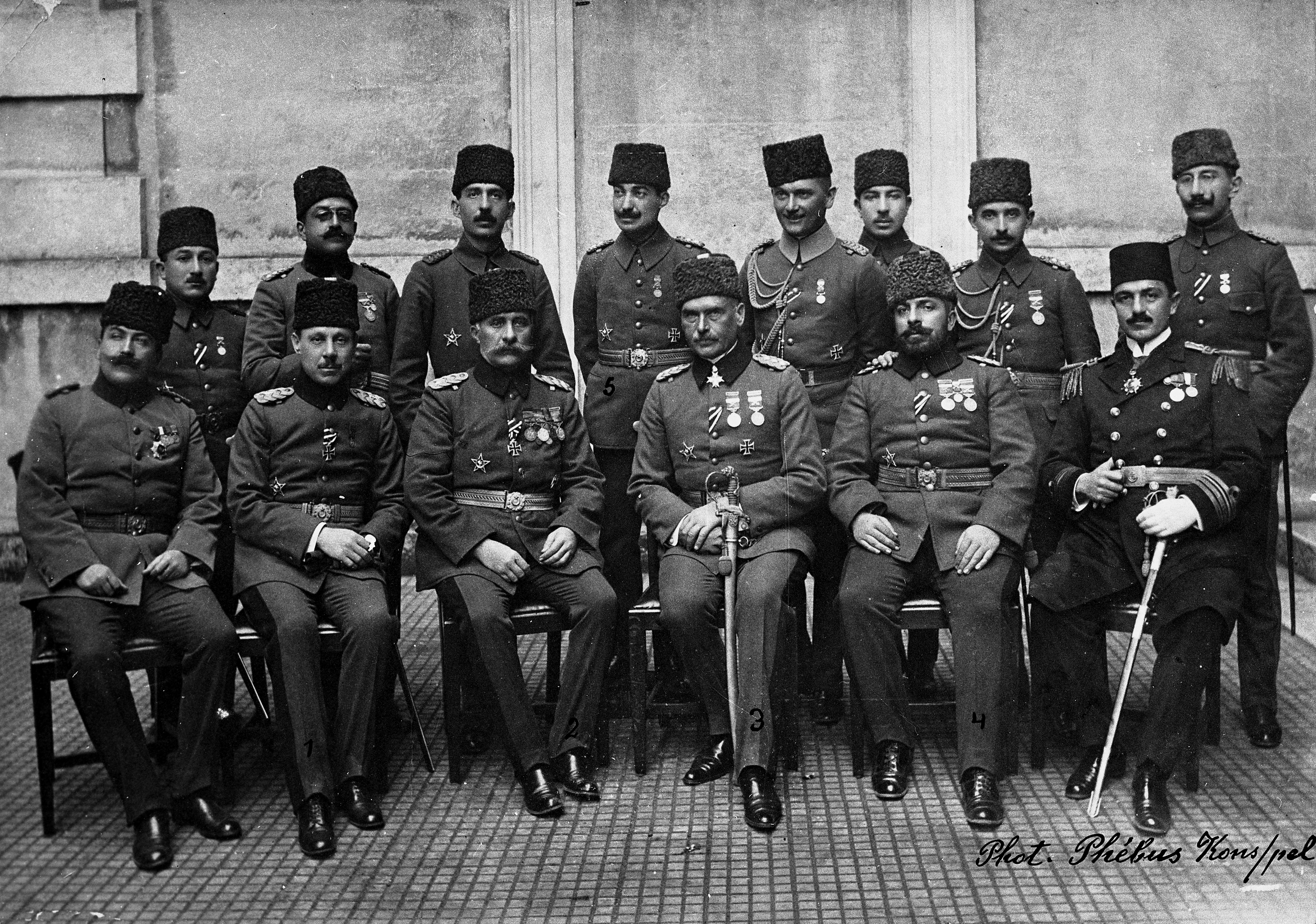
- Headquarters personnel: front row, from right to left: Hüseyin Rauf Bey, Vehib Pasha, Sanders Pasha, Esat Pasha, Süleyman Pasha, Cevat Bey?, back row, from right to left: Unnamed, İsmet Bey, (from Second Army), Âsım Bey, Erich Prigge, Kâzım Bey, Şükrü Bey (from First Army), Refik Münir Bey (from Second Army)
- Active: March 25, 1915 – November 21, 1918
- Country: Ottoman Empire
- Type: Field Army
- Engagements: Gallipoli campaign (World War I)

Commanders
- Notable commanders: Otto Liman von Sanders (March 1915 – 24 February 1918); Mahmut Kamil (February 1918); Esat Pasha (February–June 1918); Mahmut Kamil (June–November 1918)

The Fifth Army of the Ottoman Empire or Turkish Fifth Army was formed on March 24, 1915 and dissolved on November 21, 1918. It was assigned the responsibility of defending the Dardanelles straits in World War I. The original commander of the army was the German military advisor to the Ottoman Empire, General Otto Liman von Sanders. The command passed to Vehip Pasha who became responsible for the Helles front while von Sanders still wielded considerable influence.

== Order of battle, April 1915 ==
Structure in late April 1915

- III Corps (Esat Pasha)
  - 7th Division, 9th Division, 19th Division (Mustafa Kemal Atatürk)
- XV Corps (Colonel Hans Kannengiesser)
  - 3rd Division, 11th Division
- Dardanelles Fortified Area Command
- One aircraft squadron

When the Allied Battle of Gallipoli, which aimed to seize the Dardanelles, commenced, the Fifth Army comprised the III Corps defending the Gallipoli peninsula and the XV Corps ("Asian Group") defending the Asian shore. The 5th Division was north of the peninsula in the First Army.

== Order of Battle, Late Summer 1915 ==
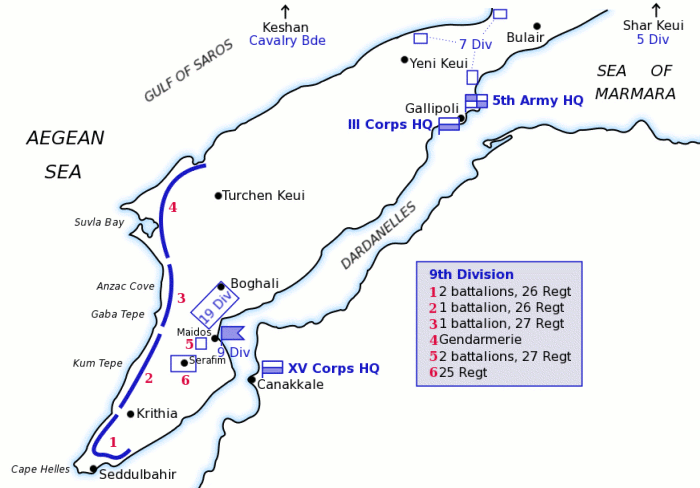
Dispositions of the 5th Army at Gallipoli

The number of divisions involved in the defence of the peninsula expanded to ten with an independent infantry regiment and a brigade of cavalry before the Battle of Sari Bair (August Offensive).

- I Corps
  - 2nd Division, 3rd Division
- II Corps
  - 4th Division, 5th Division, 6th Division
- III Corps
  - 7th Division, 8th Division, 9th Division, 19th Division
- IV Corps
  - 10th Division, 11th Division, 12th Division
- V Corps
  - 13th Division, 14th Division, 15th Division
- Dardanelles Fortified Area Command
- One aircraft squadron

Three more divisions were in the "Asian Group". The four divisions at Anzac made up the III Corps (6 at Helles, 4 at Anzac) plus additional troops..

=== Order of Battle, August 1916 ===
In August 1916, the army was structured as follows

- I Corps
  - 14th Division, 16th Division
- Dardanelles Fortified Area Command

=== Order of Battle, December 1916 ===
In December 1916, the army was structured as follows:

- XIV Corps
  - 57th Division, 59th Division
- Dardanelles Fortified Area Command

=== Order of Battle, August 1917, January 1918 ===
In August 1917, January 1918, the army was structured as follows:

- XIV Corps
  - 57th Division
- XIX Corps
  - 59th Division
- XXI Corps
  - 49th Division
- Dardanelles Fortified Area Command

=== Order of Battle, June, September 1918 ===
In June, September 1918, the army was structured as follows:

- XIV Corps
  - 57th Division
- XIX Corps
  - None
- XXI Corps
  - 49th Division
- Dardanelles Fortified Area Command

== After Mudros ==
=== Order of Battle, November 1918 ===
In November 1918, the army was structured as follows:

- I Corps
  - 55th Division
- XIV Corps
  - 49th Division, 60th Division, 61st Division

== Bibliography ==
- Erickson, Edward J. (2001). Order to Die: A History of the Ottoman Army in the First World War. Westport, CT: Greenwood Press. ISBN 0-313-31516-7.
