= Landing at Anzac Cove =

1915 battle in the First World War

- Part of the Gallipoli campaign
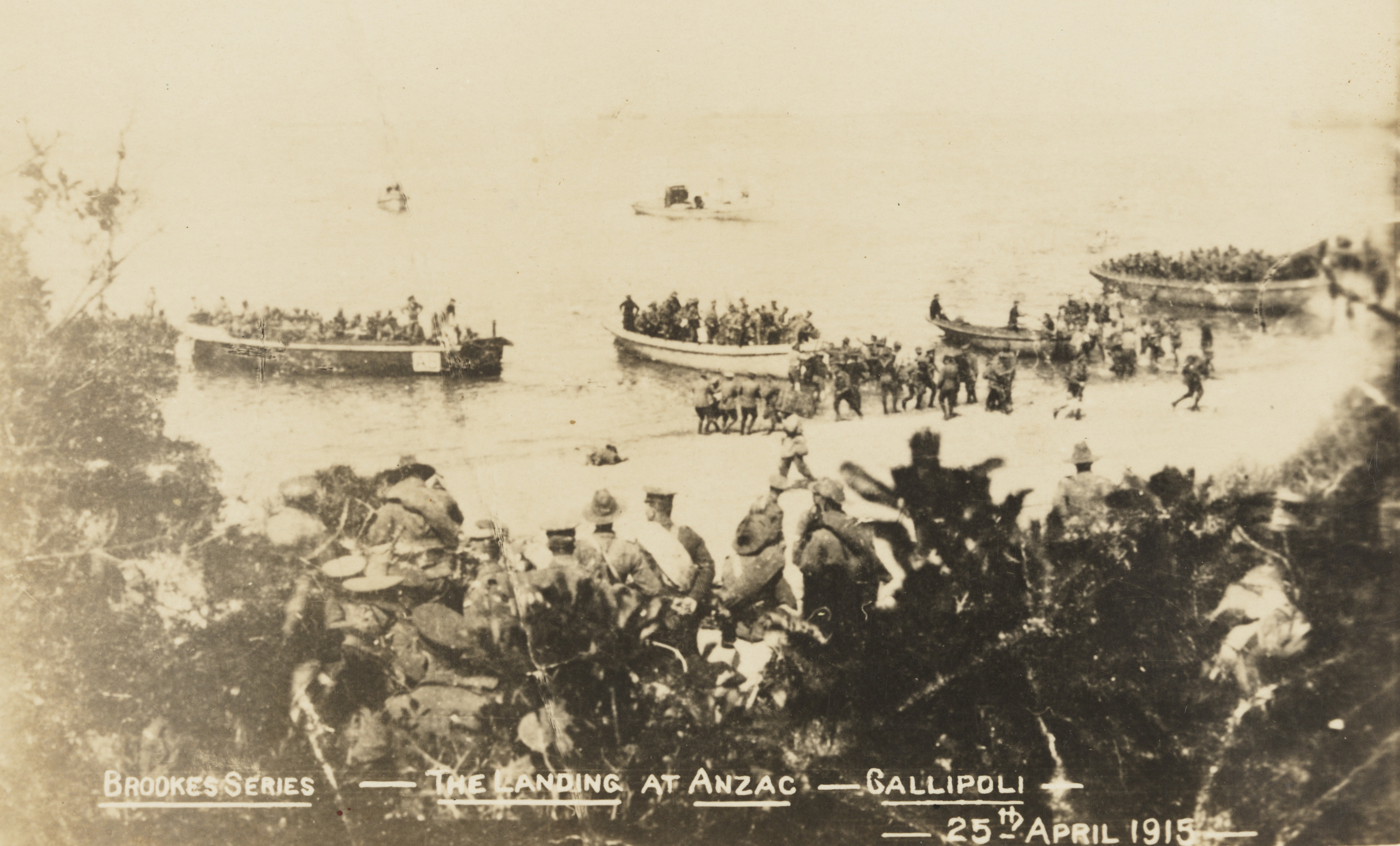
- Landing of Australian troops (4th Battalion) at Anzac Cove
Date	25 April 1915
Location	Anzac Cove, Gallipoli Peninsula, Ottoman Turkey 40°14′42″N 26°16′55″E
Result	See aftermath
Territorial changes	British forces create a bridgehead near the bay

Belligerents
British Empire: Australia; New Zealand; India; United Kingdom	Ottoman Empire

Commanders and leaders
(British Empire) William Birdwood	(Ottoman Empire) Mustafa Kemal Bey

Units involved
ANZAC: Australian Division; New Zealand and Australian Division	Elements of the: 9th Division; 19th Division

Strength
20,000 men	10,000 men

Casualties and losses
~2,000 dead and wounded 4 taken prisoner	Unknown

The landing at Anzac Cove on Sunday, 25 April 1915, also known as the landing at Gaba Tepe and, to the Turks, as the Arıburnu Battle, was part of the amphibious invasion of the Gallipoli Peninsula by the forces of the British Empire, which began the land phase of the Gallipoli campaign of the First World War.

The assault troops, mostly from the Australian and New Zealand Army Corps (ANZAC), landed at night on the western (Aegean Sea) side of the peninsula. They were put ashore one mi (1.6 km) north of their intended landing beach. In the darkness, the assault formations became mixed up, but the troops gradually made their way inland, under increasing opposition from the Ottoman Turkish defenders. (Note: At the time of the First World War, the modern Turkish state did not exist, and instead it was part of the Ottoman Turkish Empire. While the terms have distinct historical meanings, within many English-language sources the terms "Turkey" and "Ottoman Empire" are used synonymously, although sources differ in their approaches. The sources used in this article predominantly use the term "Turkey".) Not long after coming ashore, the ANZAC plans were discarded, and the companies and battalions were thrown into battle piecemeal and received mixed orders. Some advanced to their designated objectives, while others were diverted to other areas and ordered to dig in along defensive ridge lines.

Although they failed to achieve their objectives, by nightfall the ANZACs had formed a beachhead, albeit much smaller than intended. In some places, they were clinging onto cliff faces with no organised defence system. Their precarious position convinced both divisional commanders to ask for an evacuation, but after taking advice from the Royal Navy about how practicable that would be, the army commander decided they would stay. The exact number of the day's casualties is not known. The ANZACs had landed two divisions, but over two thousand of their men had been killed or wounded, together with at least a similar number of Turkish casualties.

Since 1916, the anniversary of the landings on 25 April has been commemorated as Anzac Day, becoming one of the most important commemorative dates for Australia and New Zealand. The anniversary is also commemorated in Turkey and the United Kingdom.

== Background ==
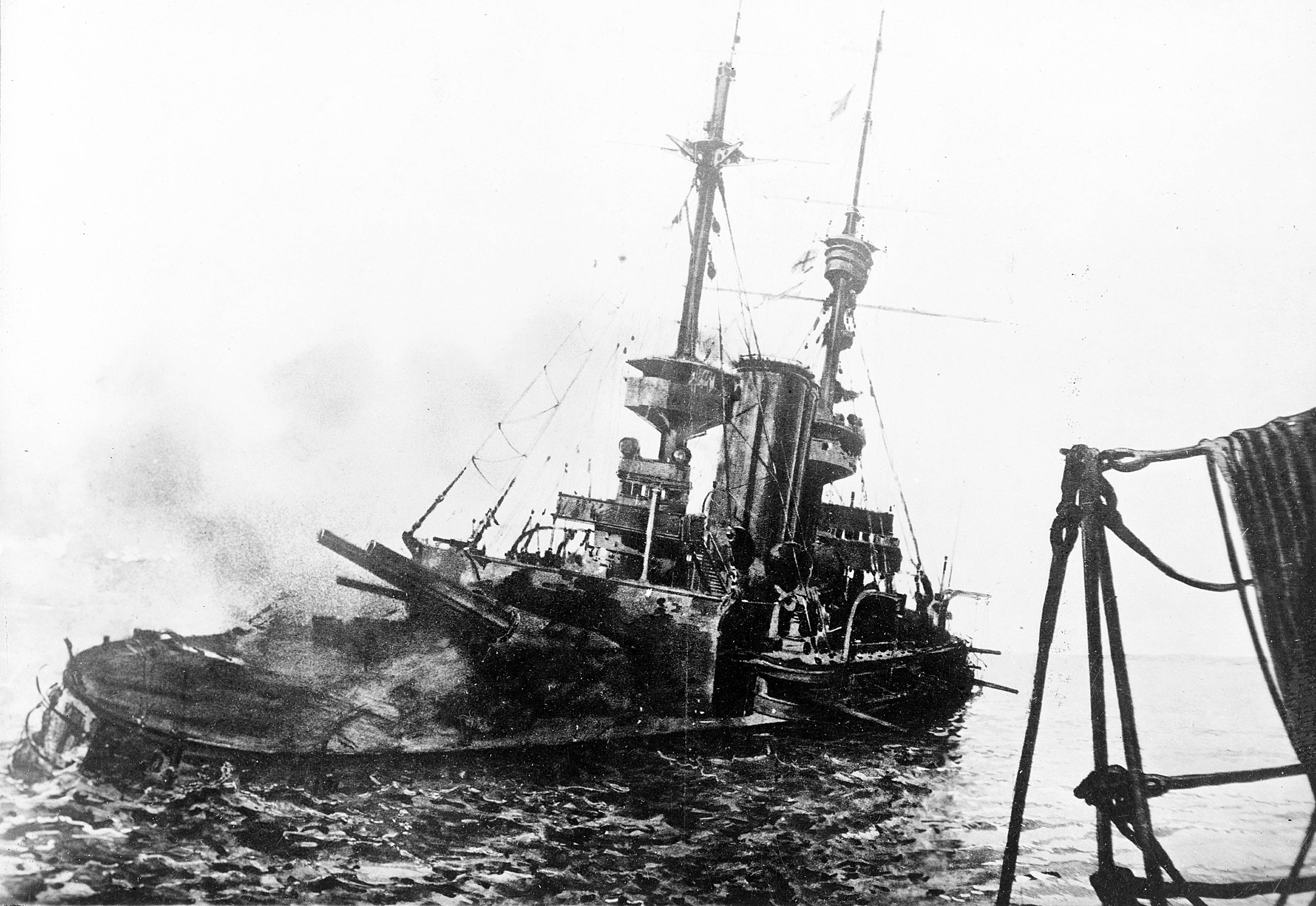
Battleship HMS Irresistible sinking during the attack on the Dardanelles Narrows, 18 March 1915

The Ottoman Turkish Empire entered the First World War on the side of the Central Powers on 31 October 1914. The stalemate of trench warfare on the Western Front convinced the British Imperial War Cabinet that an attack on the Central Powers elsewhere, particularly Turkey, could be the best way of winning the war. From February 1915 this took the form of naval operations aimed at forcing a passage through the Dardanelles, but after several setbacks it was decided that a land campaign was also necessary. To that end, the Mediterranean Expeditionary Force was formed under the command of General Ian Hamilton. Three amphibious landings were planned to secure the Gallipoli Peninsula, which would allow the navy to attack the Turkish capital Constantinople, in the hope that would convince the Turks to ask for an armistice.

=== Intention ===
Lieutenant-General William Birdwood, commanding the inexperienced Australian and New Zealand Army Corps (ANZAC), comprising the Australian Division and two brigades of the New Zealand and Australian Division, was ordered to conduct an amphibious assault on the western side of the Gallipoli Peninsula. The New Zealand and Australian Division normally also had two mounted brigades assigned to it, but these had been left in Egypt, as it was believed there would be no requirement or opportunities to use mounted troops on the peninsula. To bring the division up to strength, Hamilton had tried unsuccessfully to get a brigade of Gurkhas attached to them. In total ANZAC strength was 30,638 men.

The location chosen for the operation was between the headland of Gaba Tepe and the Fisherman's Hut, three mi (4.8 km) to the north. Landing at dawn after a naval gunfire bombardment, the first troops were to seize the lower crests and southern spurs of Hill 971. The second wave would pass them to capture the spur of Hill 971, especially Mal Tepe. There they would be positioned to cut the enemy's lines of communications to the Kilid Bahr Plateau, thus preventing the Turks from bringing reinforcements from the north to the Kilid Bahr Plateau during the attack by the British 29th Division which would advance from a separate beachhead further south-west. The capture of Mal Tepe was "more vital and valuable than the capture of the Kilid Bahr Plateau itself".

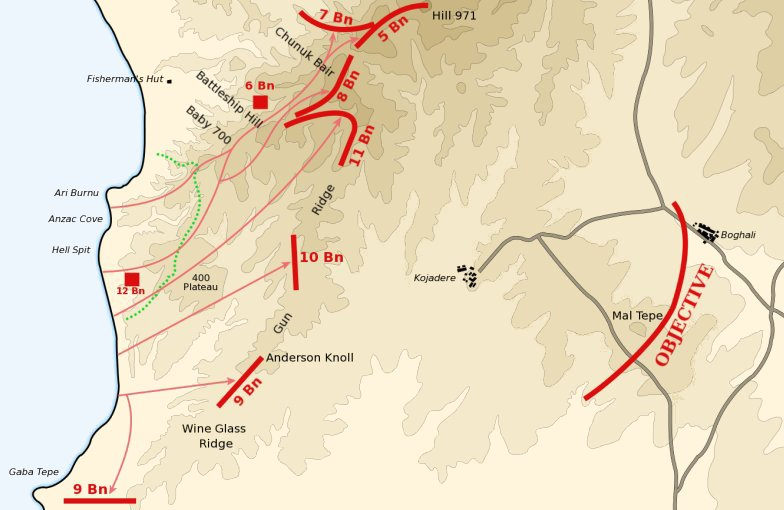
Initial objectives for the landing shown in red; the dotted green line is what was actually achieved. Darker tones indicate higher ground.

Birdwood planned to arrive off the peninsula after the moon had set, with the first troops landing at 03:30, an hour before dawn. He declined the offer of an old merchant ship, loaded with troops, being deliberately grounded at Gaba Tepe. Instead, the troops were to travel in naval and merchant ships, transferring to rowing boats towed by small steamboats to make the assault.

First ashore would be the Australian Division, commanded by Major-General William Bridges. The 3rd Australian Brigade, known as the covering force, were to capture the third ridge from Battleship Hill south along the Sari Bair mountain range to Gaba Tepe. The 2nd Australian Brigade, landing next, were to capture all the Sari Bar range up to Hill 971 on the left. The 26th Jacob's Mountain Battery (Note: Mountain artillery guns had a high angle of fire and were light and easily dismantled, intended to be carried by man or animal.) from the British Indian Army would land next and then the 1st Australian Brigade, the division's reserve; all were to be ashore by 08:30. The New Zealand and Australian Division, commanded by Major-General Alexander Godley, followed them; the 1st New Zealand Brigade then the 4th Australian Brigade. Only after the second division had landed would the advance to Mal Tepe begin. The planners had come to the conclusion that the area was sparsely, if at all, defended, and that they should be able to achieve their objectives with no problems; Turkish opposition had not been considered.

=== Turkish forces ===
The First World War Ottoman Turkish Army was modelled after the German Imperial Army, with most of its members being conscripted for two years (infantry) or three years (artillery); they then served in the reserve for the next twenty-three years. The pre-war army had 208,000 men in thirty-six divisions, formed into army corps and field armies. On mobilisation each division had three infantry and one artillery regiment for a total of around ten thousand men, or about half the size of the equivalent British formation. Unlike the largely inexperienced ANZACs, all the Turkish Army commanders, down to company commander level, were very experienced, being veterans of the Italo-Turkish and Balkan Wars.

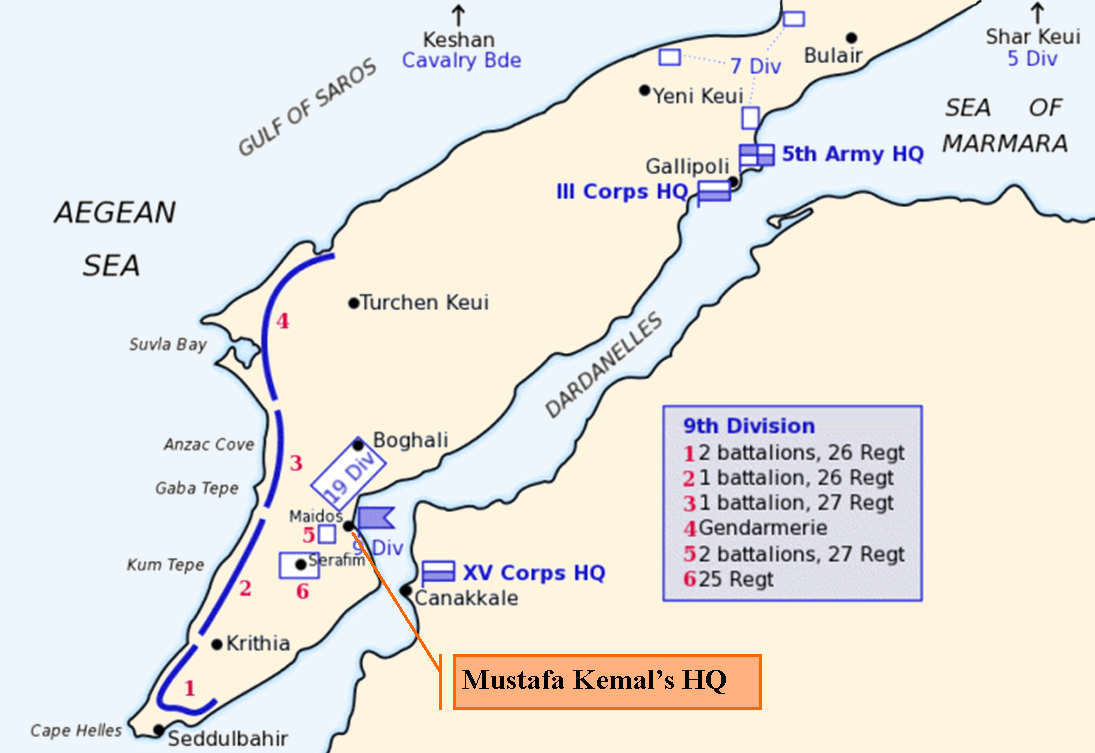
Turkish dispositions before the landings

The British preparations could not be made in secret, and by March 1915, the Turks were aware that a force of fifty thousand British and thirty thousand French troops was gathering at Lemnos. They considered there were only four likely places for them to land: Cape Helles, Gaba Tepe, Bulair, or on the Asiatic (eastern) coast of the Dardanelles.

On 24 March, the Turks formed the Fifth Army, a force of over 100,000 men, in two corps of six divisions and a cavalry brigade, commanded by the German general Otto Liman von Sanders. The Fifth Army deployed the III Corps at Gallipoli and the XV Corps on the Asiatic coast. The 5th Division and a cavalry brigade were on the European mainland, positioned to support the III Corps if required. The III Corps had the 9th Division (25th, 26th and 27th infantry regiments), the 19th Division (57th, 72nd and 77th infantry regiments) and the 7th Division (19th, 20th and 21st infantry regiments). The 9th Division provided coastal defence from Cape Helles north to Bulair, where the 7th Division took over, while the 19th Division at Maidos was the corps reserve. The area around Gaba Tepe, where the ANZAC landings would take place, was defended by the 2nd battalion of the 27th Infantry Regiment.

== Anzac Cove ==
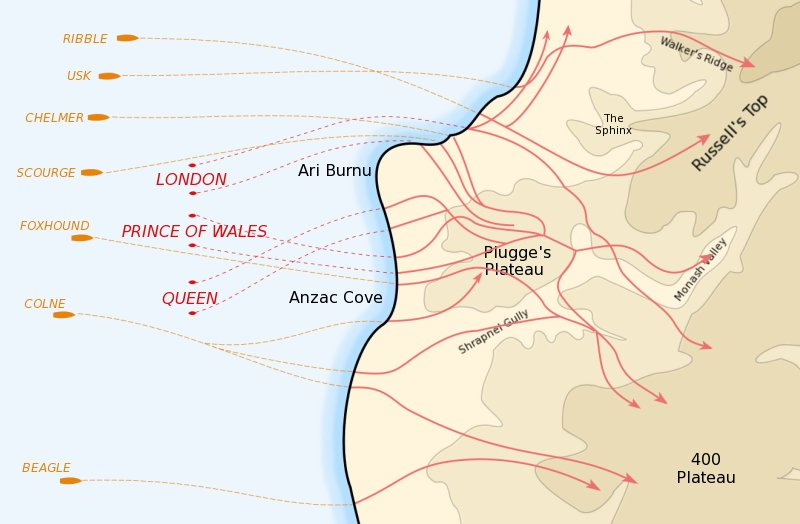
First wave landings. The dotted lines from the red ships indicate the first six companies of the first wave. Those from the orange ships are the second six companies. The solid red lines show the routes taken once ashore.

On 19 April orders were issued for the ANZACs to stop training, and for all ships and small boats to take on coal and stores, in preparation for a landing originally scheduled to occur on 23 April. Weather conditions delayed their departure from Lemnos until dawn on 24 April. The Royal Navy battleships Queen, Triumph, Prince of Wales, London, and Majestic, the cruiser Bacchante, seven destroyers and four transport ships led the way carrying the 3rd Brigade. They were followed by the rest of the force who were embarked in their own transport ships.

=== First six companies ===
At 01:00 on 25 April the British ships stopped at sea, and thirty-six rowing boats towed by twelve steamers embarked the first six companies, two each from the 9th, 10th and 11th battalions. At 02:00 a Turkish sentry reported seeing ships moving at sea, and at 02:30 the report was sent to 9th Division's headquarters. At 02:53 the ships headed towards the peninsula, continuing until 03:30 when the larger ships stopped. With 50 yards (46 m) to go, the rowing boats continued using only their oars.

Around 04:30 (Note: The exact time of the landing is not clear, and sources differ. The 12th Battalion war diary has the earliest time at 04:10, the Royal Navy has 04:20, while corps headquarters has 04:32.) Turkish sentries opened fire on the boats, but the first ANZAC troops were already ashore at Beach Z, called Ari Burnu at the time, but later known as Anzac Cove. (It was formally renamed Anzac Cove by the Turkish government in 1985.) They were one mi (1.6 km) further north than intended, and instead of an open beach they were faced with steep cliffs and ridges up to around three hundred ft (91 m) in height. However, the mistake had put them ashore at a relatively undefended area; at Gaba Tepe further south where they had planned to land, there was a strong-point, with an artillery battery close by equipped with two 15 cm and two 12 cm guns, and the 5th Company, 27th Infantry Regiment was positioned to counter-attack any landing at that more southern point. The hills surrounding the cove where the ANZACs landed made the beach safe from direct fire Turkish artillery. Fifteen minutes after the landing, the Royal Navy began firing at targets in the hills.

New Zealand troops landing at Gallipoli

On their way in, the rowing boats had become mixed up. The 11th Battalion grounded to the north of Ari Burnu point, while the 9th Battalion hit the point or just south of it, together with most of the 10th Battalion. The plan was for them to cross the open ground and assault the first ridge line, but they were faced with a hill that came down almost to the water line, and there was confusion while the officers tried to work out their location, under small arms fire from the 8th Company, (Note: In many references, this company is listed as the 4th. According to Turgut Ozakman, it was the 8th Company, commanded by Captain Faik.) 2nd Battalion, 27th Infantry Regiment, who had a platoon of between eighty and ninety men at Anzac Cove and a second platoon in the north around the Fisherman's Hut. The third platoon was in a reserve position on the second ridge. They also manned the Gaba Tepe strong-point, equipped with two obsolescent multi-barrelled Nordenfelt machine-guns, and several smaller posts in the south.

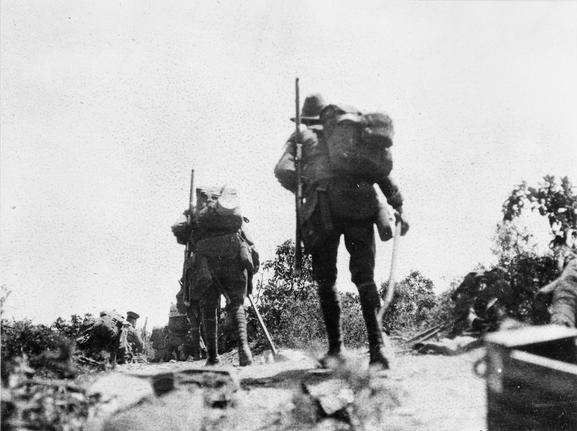
Australian troops crossing Plugge's Plateau under fire

Men from the 9th and 10th battalions started up the Ari Burnu slope, grabbing the gorse branches or digging their bayonets into the soil to provide leverage. At the peak they found an abandoned trench, the Turks having withdrawn inland. Soon the Australians reached Plugge's Plateau, the edge of which was defended by a trench, but the Turks had withdrawn to the next summit two hundred yd (180 m) inland, from where they fired at the Australians coming onto the plateau. As they arrived, Major Edmund Brockman of the 11th Battalion started sorting out the mess, sending the 9th Battalion's men to the right flank, the 11th Battalion's to the left, and keeping the 10th Battalion in the centre.

=== Second six companies ===
The second six companies landed while it was still dark, the destroyers coming to within five hundred yd (460 m) to disembark the troops, under fire. They also landed at Anzac Cove, but now as planned the 11th were in the north, 10th in the centre and the 9th in the south. The 12th Battalion landed all along the beach. This extended the beachhead 500 yd (460 m) to the north of Ari Burnu, and 1.5 mi (2.4 km) to the south. Landing under fire, some of the assaulting troops were killed in their boats, and others as they reached the beach. Once ashore they headed inland. In the south, the first men from the 9th and 12th battalions reached the bottom of 400 Plateau.

In the north, the first men from the 11th and 12th battalions started up Walker's Ridge, under fire from a nearby Turkish trench. Around the same time Turkish artillery started bombarding the beachhead, destroying at least six boats. The Australians fought their way forward and reached Russell's Top; the Turks withdrew through the Nek to Baby 700, 350 yd (320 m) away. Coming under fire again the Australians went to ground, having advanced only around one thousand yd (910 m) inland. Some also dug in at the Nek, a twenty yd (18 m) piece of high ground between Malone's Gully to the north and Monash Valley to the south. Around this time Colonel Ewen Sinclair-Maclagan, commanding the 3rd Brigade, decided to change the corps plan. Concerned about a possible counter-attack from the south, he decided to hold the Second Ridge instead of pushing forward to the Third or Gun Ridge. This hesitation suited the Turkish defence plans, which required the forward troops to gain time for the reserves to coordinate a counter-attack.

=== Turkish reaction ===
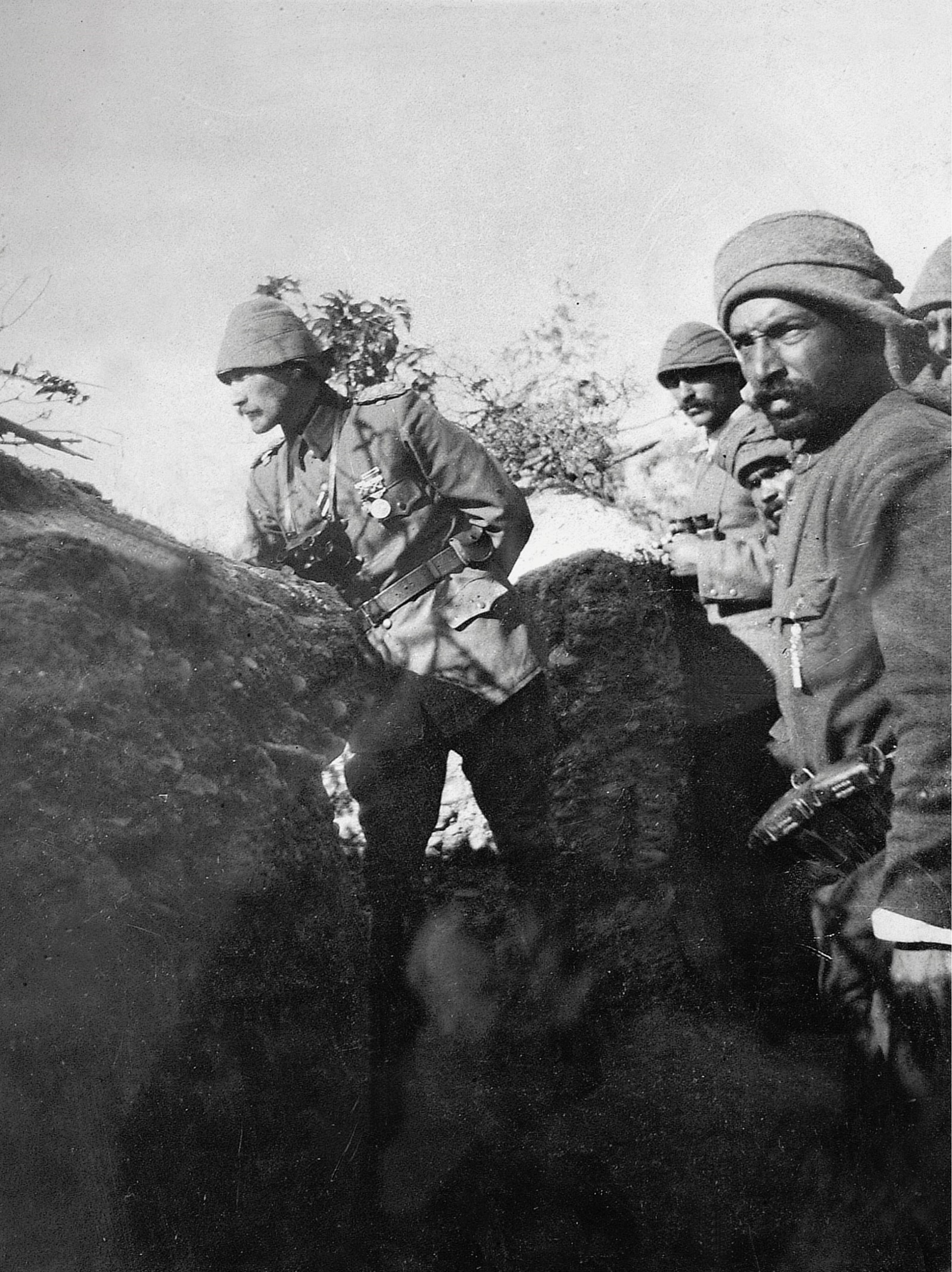
Lieutenant-Colonel Mustafa Kemal (left), whose actions as commander of the Turkish 19th Division won him lasting fame.

At 05:45, Lieutenant-Colonel Mehmet Sefik of the Turkish 27th Infantry Regiment finally received orders to move his 1st and 3rd battalions to the west and support the 2nd Battalion around Gaba Tepe. The two battalions were already awake and assembled at Eceabat, having spent that night carrying out military exercises. They could not be sent to Ari Burnu right away as it was not marked on the Turkish maps. Colonel Halil Sami, commanding the 9th Division, also ordered the division's machine-gun company and an artillery battery to move in support of the 27th Infantry Regiment, followed soon after by an 77 mm artillery battery. At 08:00 Lieutenant-Colonel Mustafa Kemal, commanding the 19th Division, was ordered to send a battalion to support them. Kemal instead decided to go himself with the 57th Infantry Regiment and an artillery battery towards Chunuk Bair, which he realised was the key point in the defence; whoever held those heights would dominate the battlefield. By chance, the 57th Infantry were supposed to have been on an exercise that morning around Hill 971 and had been prepared since 05:30, waiting for orders.

At 09:00 Sefik and his two battalions were approaching Kavak Tepe, and made contact with his 2nd Battalion that had conducted a fighting withdrawal, and an hour and a half later the regiment was deployed to stop the ANZACs advancing any further. At around 10:00 Kemal arrived at Scrubby Knoll and steadied some retreating troops, pushing them back into a defensive position. As they arrived, the 57th Infantry Regiment were given their orders and prepared to counter-attack. Scrubby Knoll, known to the Turks as Kemalyeri (Kemal's Place), now became the site of the Turkish headquarters for the remainder of the campaign.

== Baby 700 ==
Baby 700 is a hill in the Sari Bair range, next to Battleship Hill or Big 700. It was named after its supposed height above sea level, though its actual height is only 590 ft (180 m).

Maclagen sent the 11th Battalion, Captain Joseph Lalor's company of the 12th Battalion and Major James Robertson's of the 9th, towards Baby 700. Brockman divided his own company, sending half up the right fork of Rest Gully, and half up the left, while Brockman and a reserve platoon headed up Monash Valley. As they moved forward, Turkish artillery targeted them with air burst shrapnel shells, which dispersed the companies. This, coupled with senior officers diverting men to other areas instead of towards Baby 700, meant only fragments of the units eventually reached Baby 700.

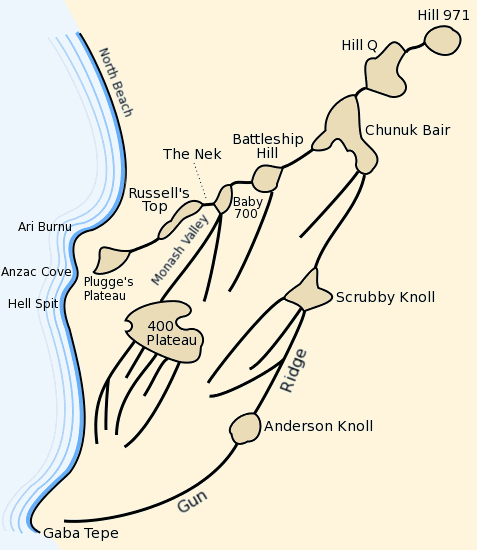
Ridges and plateaus at Anzac Cove

Arriving at Baby 700, Captain Eric Tulloch, 11th Battalion, decided to take his remaining sixty men towards Battleship Hill, leaving Lalor's company to dig in and defend The Nek. Tulloch moved around to the right before advancing towards the summit. The 11th Battalion crossed the first rise unopposed, but at the second, Turkish defenders around 400 yd (370 m) away opened fire on them. Going to ground, the Australians returned fire. When the Turkish fire slackened the remaining fifty men resumed their advance, reaching the now-evacuated Turkish position, behind which was a large depression, with Battleship Hill beyond that. Still under fire they moved forward again, then around 700 yd (640 m) from the summit the Turks opened fire on them from a trench. The Australians held out for thirty minutes, but increasing Turkish fire and mounting casualties convinced Tulloch to withdraw. No other ANZAC unit would advance as far inland that day.

At 08:30 Robertson and Lalor decided to take their companies up Baby 700. Instead of going around to the right like Tulloch, they went straight up the centre, crossed over the summit onto the northern slope and went to ground. A spur on their left, leading to Suvla Bay, was defended by a Turkish trench system. At 09:15 Turkish troops started moving down Battleship Hill, and for the next hour they exchanged fire. Where the spur joined Baby 700, a group of Australians from the 9th, 11th, and 12th battalions crossed Malone's Gully and charged the Turkish trench. A Turkish machine-gun on Baby 700 opened fire on them, forcing them back, followed by a general withdrawal of Australian troops. The Turks had secured Battleship Hill and were now driving the Australians off Baby 700. From his headquarters at the head of Monash Valley, Maclagen could see the Turks attacking, and started sending all available men towards Baby 700.

=== Second wave ===
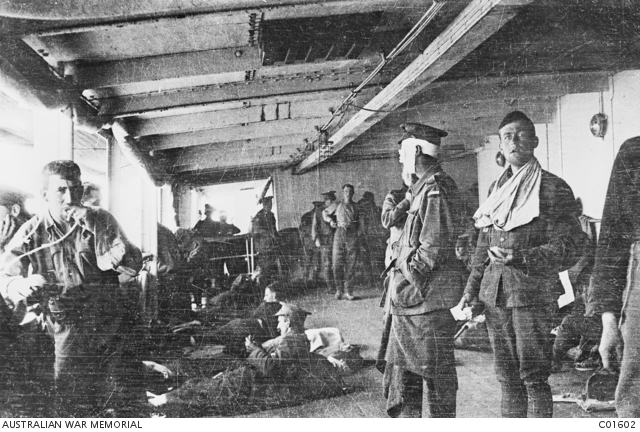
Wounded men 3 days after the Gallipoli landing. Australian War Memorial C0162

The 2nd Brigade landed between 05:30 and 07:00, and the reserve 1st Brigade landed between 09:00 and 12:00, already putting the timetable behind schedule.

Private Victor Rupert Laidlaw (2nd Field Ambulance) gave this eyewitness account of the landing:

25 April No lights were allowed when we got up ...... we heard the big guns booming and in the distance we could see the battleships shelling the forts. Shrapnel was bursting everywhere and it was making an awful row. We could also hear in the distance the rifle shots, they just sound like croaking frogs to me. At 5.30 a.m. we were told to fall in quite prepared to tranship to a destroyer which we did at 6.15 a.m. we are now on the way to the shore, a large number of boat loads of wounded are being taken to the hospital ship.....I can see one Queen Elizabeth pounding along with her 15 inch guns, the sea is very calm, we landed a few minutes later, and we did get a hot reception, for no sooner did we land than we were exposed to a heavy fire. I am glad to say that we all got under cover safely, we lost a terrible number of men landing as the Turks were quite prepared for us. ....Soon the wounded began to pour in. A large number were flesh wounds. The shrapnel is the worst of all....when night fell our work really began, but although there was a very heavv fire, we were able to reach the trenches and get out the men who had been lying there all-day. The country we are fighting in is awful. It is very mountainous and snipers get in among the trees and do their deathly work. The work of getting the wounded away is very dangerous and we can't get stretchers into some of the places owing to the steep gullies. The warships keep up a very heavy fire on the forts night and day.

The 2nd Brigade, which were supposed to be heading for Baby 700 on the left, were instead sent to the right to counter a Turkish attack building up there. At 07:20 Bridges and his staff landed; finding no senior officers on the beach to brief them, they set out to locate the 3rd Brigade headquarters.

The 1st Brigade were on the opposite flank to the 3rd Brigade and already getting involved in battles of their own, when their commander, Colonel Percy Owen, received a request from Maclagen for reinforcements. Owen sent two companies from the 3rd Battalion and one from the 1st Battalion (Swannell's) to support the 3rd Brigade.

Soon after, Lalor's company had been forced back to The Nek and the Turks were threatening to recapture Russell's Top, and at 10:15 Maclagen reported to Bridges his doubts over being able to hold out. In response Bridges sent part of his reserve, two companies from the 2nd Battalion (Gordon's and Richardson's), to reinforce the 3rd Brigade.

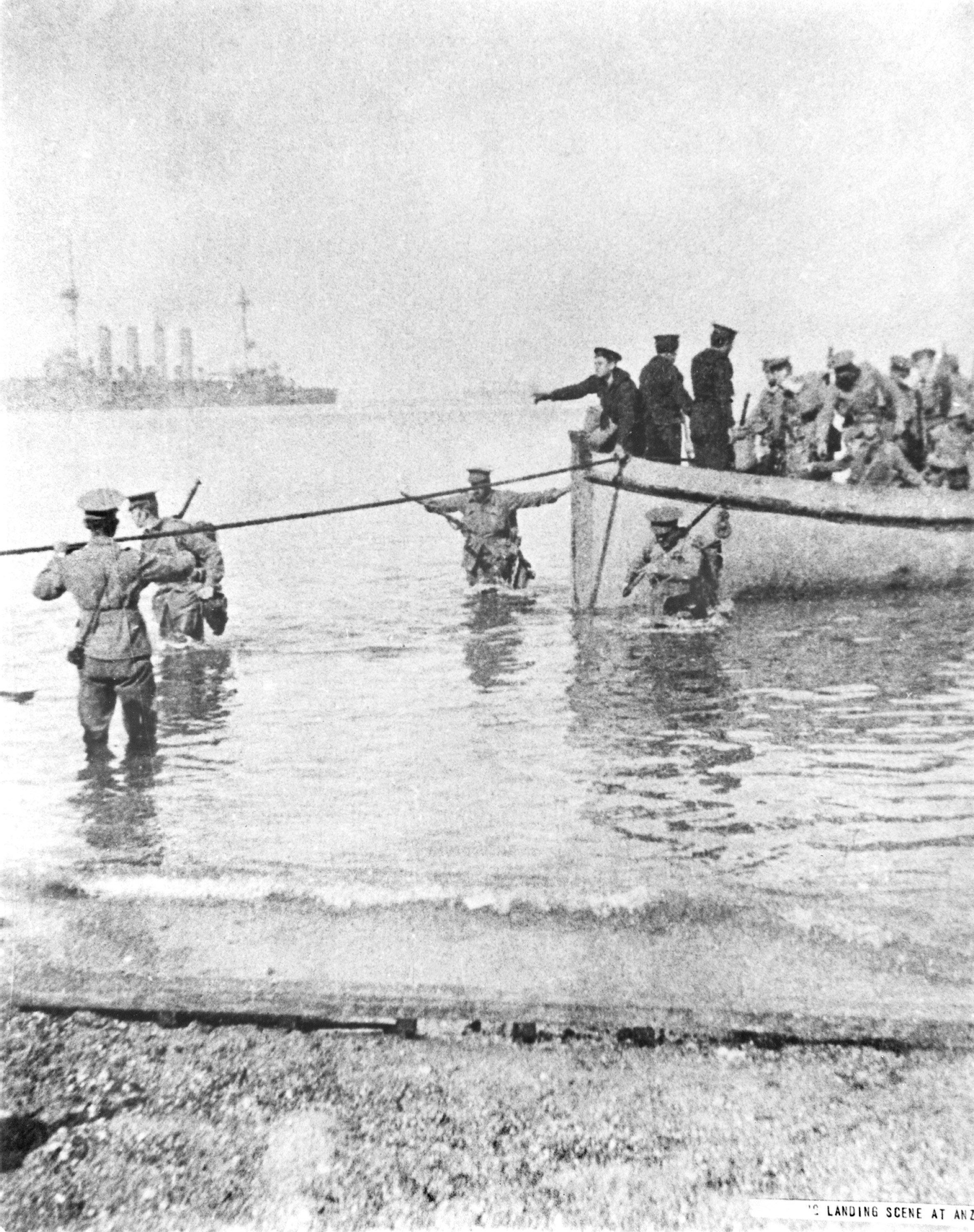
Men of the second wave coming ashore

At 11:00 Swannell's company arrived at the foot of Baby 700, joining the seventy survivors of Robertson's and Lalor's companies. They immediately charged and chased the Turks back over the summit of Baby 700, then stopped and dug in. The two 2nd Battalion companies arrived alongside them, but all the companies had taken casualties, among the dead being Swannell and Robertson.

By this time most of the 3rd Brigade men had been killed or wounded, and the line was held by the five depleted companies from the 1st Brigade. On the left, Gordon's company 2nd Battalion, with the 11th and 12th battalions' survivors, charged five times and captured the summit of Baby 700, but were driven back by Turkish counter-attacks; Gordon was among the casualties. For the second time Maclagen requested reinforcements for Baby 700, but the only reserves Bridges had available were two 2nd Battalion companies and the 4th Battalion. It was now 10:45 and the advance companies of the 1st New Zealand Brigade were disembarking, so it was decided they would go to Baby 700.

=== Third wave ===
The New Zealand brigade commander had been taken ill, so Birdwood appointed Brigadier-General Harold Walker, a staff officer already ashore, as commander. The Auckland Battalion had landed by 12:00, and were being sent north along the beach to Walker's Ridge on their way to Russell's Top. Seeing that the only way along the ridge was in single file along a goat track, Walker ordered them to take the route over Plugge's Plateau. As each New Zealand unit landed they were directed the same way to Baby 700. However, in trying to avoid Turkish fire, they became split up in Monash Valley and Rest Gully, and it was after midday that two of the Auckland companies reached Baby 700.

At 12:30 two companies of the Canterbury Battalion landed and were sent to support the Aucklands, who had now been ordered back to Plugge's Plateau, and were forming on the left of the 3rd Brigade. The Canterbury companies moved into the line on the Aucklands' left, waiting for the rest of their brigade to land. However, between 12:30 and 16:00 not one infantry or artillery formation came ashore. The ships carrying the New Zealanders were in the bay, but the steamers and rowing boats were being used to take the large numbers of wounded to the hospital ship. The transports with the 4th Australian Brigade on board were still well out at sea and not due to land until that evening. The landings recommenced around 16:30 when the Wellington Battalion came ashore, followed by the Otago Battalion around 17:00, who were put into the line beside the Aucklanders. Next to land were the two other Canterbury companies, who were sent north to Walker's Ridge to extend the corps' left flank. Events ashore now forced a change in the disembarkation schedule, and at 17:50 orders were issued for the 4th Australian Brigade to start landing to boost the defence. It would take until the next day for the complete brigade to come ashore. The transports carrying both divisions' artillery batteries had been forced further out to sea by Turkish artillery fire, and were unable to land.

=== MacLaurin's Hill ===
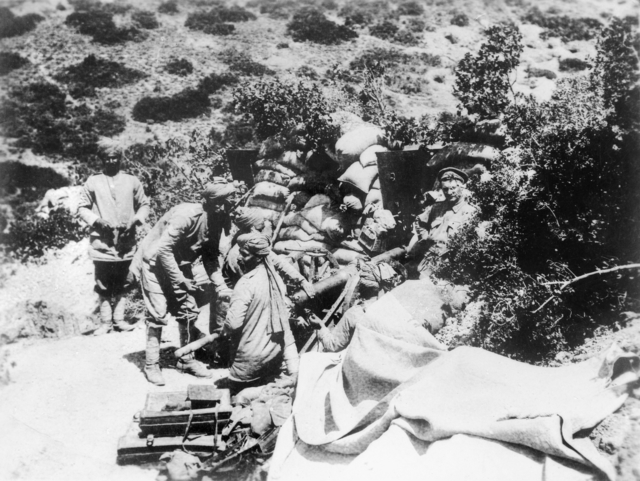
An Indian mountain battery in action at the back of Quinn's Post at Anzac Cove

MacLaurin's Hill is a 1,000 yard (910 m) long section of the Second Ridge that connects Baby 700 to 400 Plateau, with a steep slope on the ANZAC side down to Monash Valley. In the coming days Quinn's, Steel's and Courtney's posts would be built on the slope. The first ANZAC troops to reach the hill, from the 11th Battalion, found that the Turkish defenders had already withdrawn. As the Australians crested the hill they came under fire from Baby 700, but to their front was a short, shallow slope into Mule Valley. When Major James Denton's company of the 11th Battalion arrived at the hill they started digging in, and soon after received orders from MacLagen to hold the position at all costs. At 10:00 Turkish troops, advancing from Scrubby Knoll, got to within 300 yd (270 m) of the Australians on the hill, opening fire at them. Altogether there were two and a half companies from the 11th Battalion between Courtney's Post, Steele's Post, and Wire Gully. They had not been there long before the 3rd Battalion arrived to reinforce them.

== 400 Plateau ==
The 400 Plateau, named for its height above sea level, was a wide and level plateau on the second ridge line, about 600 by 600 yd (550 by 550 m) wide and around 1,000 yd (910 m) from Gun Ridge. The northern half of the plateau became known as Johnston's Jolly, and the southern half as Lone Pine, with Owen's Gully between them.

=== 3rd Brigade ===
If the landings had gone to plan, the 11th Battalion would have been crossing the plateau heading north. The 10th Battalion, south of the plateau, were to capture a Turkish trench and artillery battery behind Gun Ridge. The 9th Battalion, furthest south, were to attack the artillery battery at Gaba Tepe, and the 12th Battalion were the reserve, with 26th Jacob's Mountain Battery to establish their gun line on the plateau. Unknown to the ANZACs, the Turks had an artillery battery sited on 400 Plateau.

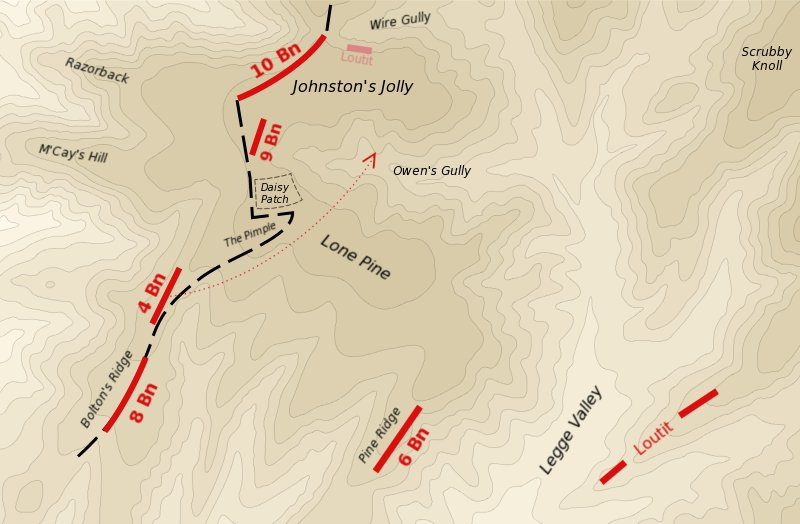
The ANZAC positions on 400 Plateau on 25 April (red) and 26 April (black)

After landing, some of the 9th and 10th battalions' men headed for 400 Plateau. The first 10th Battalion platoon to arrive was commanded by Lieutenant Noel Loutit, and accompanied by the brigade-major, Charles Brand. They discovered the Turkish battery in the Lone Pine sector, which was preparing to move. As the Australians opened fire the battery withdrew down Owen's Gully. Brand remained on the plateau and ordered Loutit to continue after the Turkish battery. However, the guns had been hidden at the head of the gully and Loutit's platoon moved beyond them. Around the same time, Lieutenant Eric Smith and his 10th Battalion scouts and Lieutenant G. Thomas with his platoon from the 9th Battalion arrived on the plateau, looking for the guns. As they crossed the plateau Turkish machine-guns opened fire on them from the Lone Pine area. One of Thomas's sections located the battery, which had started firing from the gully. They opened fire, charged the gun crews, and captured the guns. The Turks did manage to remove the breech blocks, making the guns inoperable, so the Australians damaged the sights and internal screw mechanisms to put them out of action. By now the majority of the 9th and 10th battalions, along with brigade commander Maclagen, had arrived on the plateau, and he ordered them to dig in on the plateau instead of advancing to Gun Ridge. However, the units that had already passed beyond there were obeying their orders to "go as fast as you can, at all costs keep going".

Loutit, Lieutenant J. Haig of the 10th, and thirty-two men from the 9th, 10th, and 11th battalions crossed Legge Valley and climbed a spur of Gun Ridge, just to the south of Scrubby Knoll. As they reached the top, about 400 yd (370 m) further inland was Gun Ridge, defended by a large number of Turkish troops. Loutit and two men carried out a reconnaissance of Scrubby Knoll, from the top of which they could see the Dardanelles, around 3 mi (4.8 km) to the east. When one of the men was wounded they returned to the rest of their group, which was being engaged by Turkish machine-gun and rifle fire. Around 08:00, Loutit sent a man back for reinforcements; he located Captain J. Ryder of the 9th Battalion, with half a company of men at Lone Pine. Ryder had not received the order to dig in, so he advanced and formed a line on Loutit's right. Soon after, they came under fire from Scrubby Knoll and were in danger of being cut off; Ryder sent a message back for more reinforcements. The messenger located Captain John Peck, the 11th Battalion's adjutant, who collected all the men around him and went forward to reinforce Ryder. It was now 09:30 and the men on the spur, outflanked by the Turks, had started to withdraw. At 10:00, the Turks set up a machine-gun on the spur and opened fire on the withdrawing Australians. Pursued by the Turks, only eleven survivors, including Loutit and Haig, reached Johnston's Jolly and took cover. Further back, two companies of the 9th and the 10th battalions had started digging a trench line.

=== 2nd Brigade ===
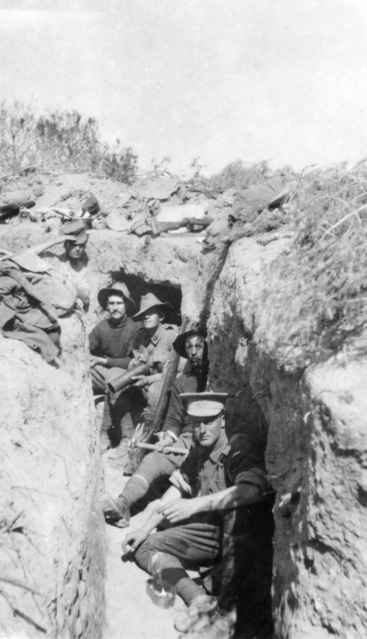
Men of the Australian 8th Battalion in an abandoned Turkish position on Bolton's Ridge

As part of the second wave, the 2nd Brigade had been landing since 05:30; the 5th, 6th and 8th battalions were supposed to cross 400 Plateau and head to Hill 971, while the 7th Battalion on the left was to climb Plugge's Plateau then make for Hill 971. One 7th Battalion company, Jackson's, landed beside the Fisherman's Hut in the north and was almost wiped out; only forty men survived the landing. At 06:00 Major Ivie Blezard's 7th Battalion company, and part of another, were sent onto 400 Plateau by Maclagen to strengthen the defence. When the 7th Battalion commander Lieutenant-Colonel Harold Elliott landed he realised events were not going to plan, and he headed to the 3rd Brigade headquarters to find out what was happening. Maclagen ordered him to gather his battalion at the south of the beachhead, as the 2nd Brigade would now form the division's right flank, not left. When the 2nd Brigade commander Colonel James McCay arrived Maclagen convinced him to move his brigade to the south, swapping responsibility with the 3rd Brigade. Eventually agreeing, he established his headquarters on the seaward slope of 400 Plateau (McCay's Hill). Heading onto the plateau, McCay realised the ridge to his right, Bolton's Ridge, would be a key point in their defence. He located the brigade-major, Walter Cass, and ordered him to gather what men he could to defend the ridge. Looking around, he saw the 8th Battalion, commanded by Colonel William Bolton, moving forward, so Cass directed them to Bolton's Ridge. As such, it was the only ANZAC battalion that remained together during the day. Eventually, at around 07:00, the rest of the brigade started arriving. As each company and battalion appeared they were pushed forward into the front line, but with no defined orders other than to support the 3rd Brigade. At 10:30 the six guns of the 26th Jacobs Mountain Battery arrived, positioning three guns on each side of White's Valley. At noon, they opened fire on the Turks on Gun Ridge.

Within two hours half the Australian Division was involved in the battle of 400 Plateau. However, most of the officers had misunderstood their orders. Believing the intention was to occupy Gun Ridge and not hold their present position, they still tried to advance. The 9th and 10th battalions had started to form a defensive line, but there was a gap between them that the 7th Battalion was sent to fill. Seeing the 2nd Brigade coming forward, units of the 3rd Brigade started to advance to Gun Ridge. The advancing Australians did not then know that the counter-attacking Turkish forces had reached the Scrubby Knoll area around 08:00 and were prepared for them. As the Australians reached the Lone Pine section of the plateau, Turkish machine guns and rifles opened fire, decimating the Australians. To the north, other troops, advancing beyond Johnstone's Jolly and Owen's Gully, were caught by the same small arms fire. Soon afterwards, a Turkish artillery battery also started firing at them. This was followed by a Turkish counter-attack from Gun Ridge. Such was the situation they now found themselves in that, at 15:30, McCay, now giving up all pretence of advancing to Gun Ridge, ordered his brigade to dig in from Owen's Gully to Bolton's Ridge.

=== Pine Ridge ===
Pine Ridge is part of the 400 Plateau, and stretches, in a curve towards the sea, for around 1 mi (1.6 km). Beyond Pine Ridge is Legge Valley and Gun Ridge and, like the rest of the terrain, it was covered in a thick gorse scrub, but it also had stunted pine trees around eleven ft (3.4 m) tall growing on it.

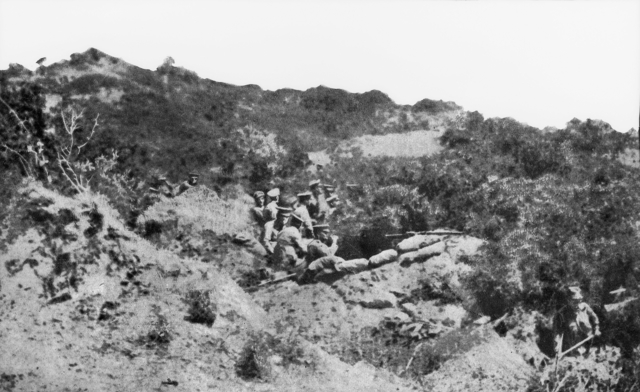
Small Australian trench in the gorse

Several groups of men eventually made their way to Pine Ridge. Among the first was Lieutenant Eric Plant's platoon from the 9th Battalion. Captain John Whitham's company of the 12th Battalion moved forward from Bolton's Ridge when they saw the 6th Battalion moving up behind them. As the 6th Battalion reached the ridge, the companies carried on towards Gun Ridge, while Lieutenant-Colonel Walter McNicoll established the battalion headquarters below Bolton's Ridge. As the 6th Battalion moved forward they were engaged by Turkish small arms and artillery fire, causing heavy casualties. At 10:00 brigade headquarters received a message from the 6th Battalion asking for reinforcement, and McCay sent half the 5th Battalion to assist. At the same time, the 8th Battalion were digging in on Bolton's (except for two companies which moved forward to attack a group of Turks that had come up from the south behind the 6th Battalion). By noon, the 8th Battalion were dug in on the ridge; in front of them were scattered remnants of the 5th, 6th, 7th, and 9th battalions, mostly out of view of each other in the scrub. Shortly after, McCay was informed that if he wanted the 6th Battalion to hold their position, it must be reinforced. So McCay sent his last reserves, a company of the 1st Battalion, and ordered the 8th to leave one company on the ridge and advance on the right of the 6th Battalion. The scattered formations managed to hold their positions for the remainder of the afternoon, then at 17:00 saw large numbers of Turkish troops coming over the southern section of Gun Ridge.

== Turkish counter-attack ==
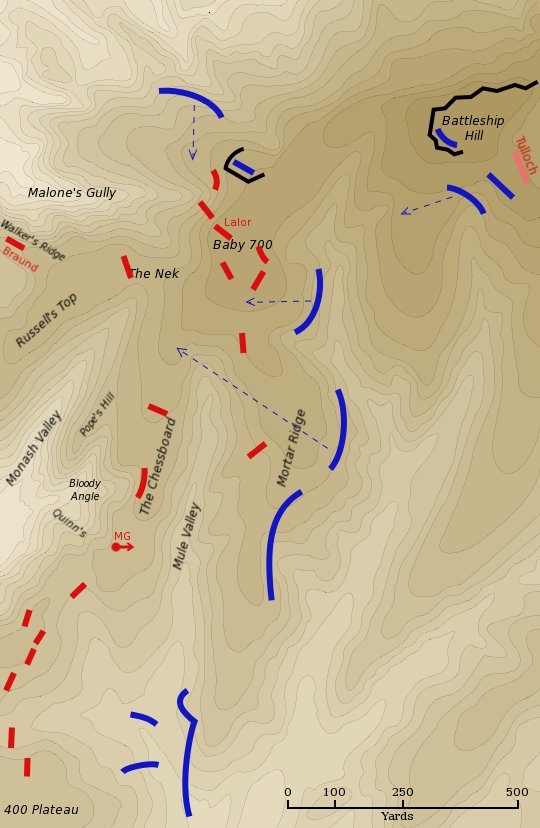
Turkish counter-attack (blue) against ANZAC forces (red); the trench system is shown in black

At around 10:00, Kemal and the 1st Battalion, 57th Infantry, were the first to arrive in the area between Scrubby Knoll and Chunuk Bair. From the knoll, Kemal was able to observe the landings. He ordered the artillery battery to set up on the knoll, and the 1st Battalion to attack Baby 700 and Mortar Ridge from the North-East, while the 2nd Battalion would simultaneously circle around and attack Baby 700 from the West. The 3rd Battalion would for the moment be held in reserve. At 10:30, Kemal informed II Corps he was attacking.

At 11:30, Sefik told Kemal that the ANZACs had a beachhead of around 2,200 yd (2,000 m), and that he would attack towards Ari Burnu, in conjunction with the 19th Division. Around midday Kemal was appraised that the 9th Division was fully involved with the British landings at Cape Helles, and could not support his attack, so at 12:30 he ordered two battalions of the 77th Infantry Regiment (the third battalion was guarding Suvla Bay) to move forward between the 57th and 27th infantry regiments. At the same time, he ordered his reserve 72nd Infantry Regiment to move further west. Within the next half-hour the 27th and 57th infantry regiments started the counter-attack, supported by three batteries of artillery. At 13:00 Kemal met with his corps commander Esat Pasha and convinced him of the need to react in strength to the ANZAC landings. Esat agreed and released the 72nd and 27th infantry regiments to Kemal's command. Kemal deployed the four regiments from north to south; 72nd, 57th, 27th and 77th. In total, Turkish strength opposing the landing numbered between ten thousand and twelve thousand men.

=== North ===
At 15:15, Lalor left the defence of The Nek to a platoon that had arrived as reinforcements, and moved his company to Baby 700. There he joined a group from the 2nd Battalion, commanded by Lieutenant Leslie Morshead. Lalor was killed soon afterwards. The left flank of Baby 700 was now held by sixty men, the remnants of several units, commanded by a corporal. They had survived five charges by the Turks between 07:30 and 15:00; after the last charge the Australians were ordered to withdraw through The Nek. There, a company from the Canterbury Battalion had just arrived, with their commanding officer, Lieutenant-Colonel Douglas Stewart. By 16:00 the New Zealand companies had formed a defence line on Russell's Top. On Baby 700, there was on the left Morsehead's and Lalor's men, and at the top of Malone's Gulley were the survivors of the 2nd Battalion and some men from the 3rd Brigade. On the right were the men left from the Auckland companies, and a mixed group from the 1st, 2nd, 11th and 12th battalions. Once Stewart's men were secure, he ordered Morsehead to withdraw. During a Turkish artillery bombardment of The Nek, Stewart was killed. The artillery heralded the start of a Turkish counter-attack; columns of troops appeared over the top of Battleship Hill and on the flanks and attacked the ANZAC lines.

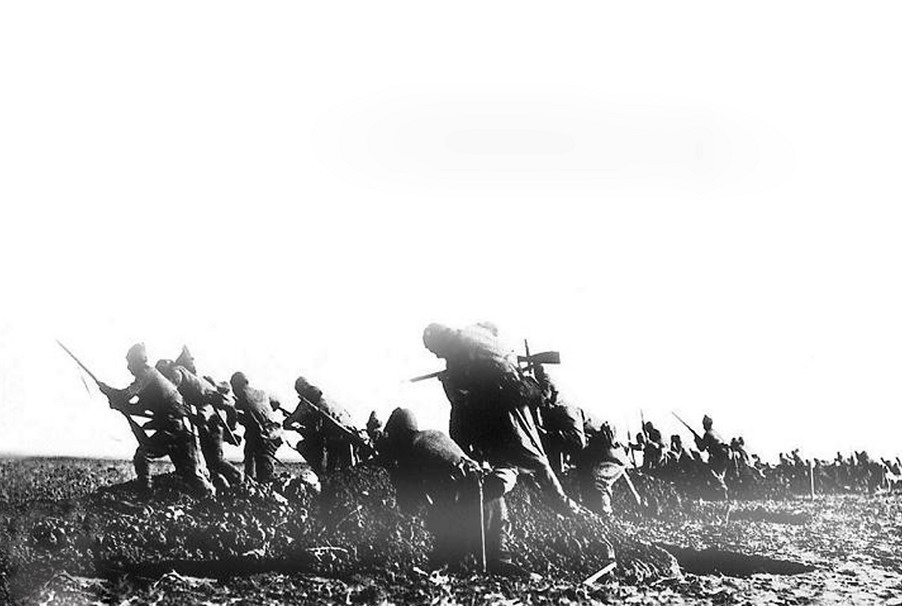
Turkish troops leaving their trench in an attack

At 16:30 the three battalions from the 72nd Infantry Regiment arrived and attacked from the north. At the same time the Australians and New Zealanders holding on at Baby 700 broke and ran back to an improvised line, from Walker's Ridge in the north to Pope's Hill in the south. The defence line at The Nek was now defended by nine New Zealanders, under the command of a sergeant; they had three machine-guns but the crews had all been killed or wounded. As the survivors arrived from Baby 700 their numbers rose to around sixty. Bridges in his divisional headquarters starting receiving messages from the front; just after 17:00 Lieutenant-Colonel George Braund on Walker's Ridge advised he was holding his position and "if reinforced could advance". At 17:37, Maclagen reported they were being "heavily attacked", at 18:15 the 3rd Battalion signalled, "3rd Brigade being driven back". At 19:15, from Maclagen again "4th Brigade urgently required". Bridges sent two hundred stragglers, from several different battalions, to reinforce Braund and promised two extra battalions from the New Zealand and Australian Division which was now coming ashore.

Dusk was at 19:00 and the Turkish attack had now reached Malone's Gulley and The Nek. The New Zealanders waited until the Turks came close, then opened fire in the darkness, stopping their advance. Seriously outnumbered, they asked for reinforcements. Instead, the supporting troops to their rear were withdrawn and the Turks managed to get behind them. So, taking the machine-guns with them, they withdrew off Russell's Top into Rest Gully. This left the defenders at Walker's Ridge isolated from the rest of the force.

=== South ===
The Australians on 400 Plateau had for some time been subjected to sniping and artillery fire and could see Turkish troops digging in on Gun Ridge. Around 13:00 a column of Turkish reinforcements from the 27th Infantry Regiment, in at least battalion strength, were observed moving along the ridge-line from the south. The Turks then turned towards 400 Plateau and advanced in extended order. The Turkish counter-attack soon forced the advanced Australian troops to withdraw, and their machine-gun fire caused heavy casualties. It was not long before the attack had forced a wedge between the Australians on Baby 700 and those on 400 Plateau. The heavy Turkish fire onto Lone Pine forced the survivors to withdraw back to the western slope of 400 Plateau. At 14:25, Turkish artillery and small arms fire was so heavy that the Indian artillerymen were forced to push their guns back off the plateau by hand, and they reformed on the beach.

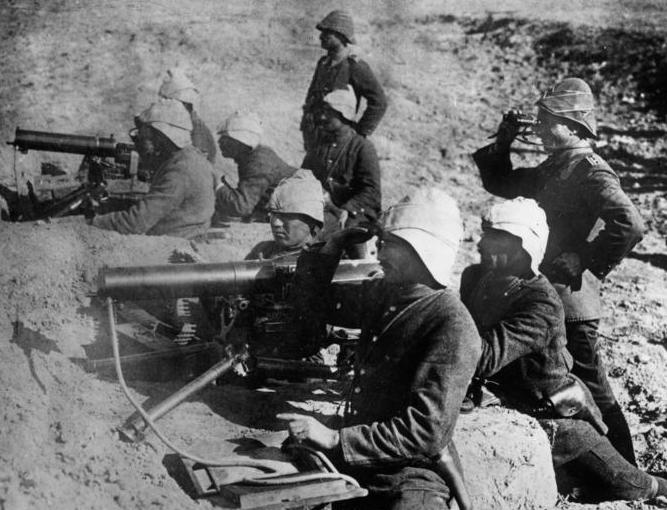
Turkish machine-gunners at Gallipoli

Although in places there was a mixture of different companies and platoons dug in together, the Australians were deployed with the 8th Battalion in the south still centred on Bolton's Ridge. North of them, covering the southern sector of 400 Plateau, were the mixed together 6th and 7th battalions, both now commanded by Colonel Walter McNicoll of the 6th. North of them were the 5th Battalion, and the 10th Battalion covered the northern sector of 400 Plateau at Johnston's Jolly. But by now they were battalions in name only, having all taken heavy casualties; the commanders had little accurate knowledge of where their men were located.

At 15:30, the two battalions of the Turkish 77th Infantry Regiment were in position, and with the 27th Infantry they counter-attacked again. At 15:30 and at 16:45 McCay, now under severe pressure, requested reinforcements. The second time he was informed there was only one uninvolved battalion left, the 4th, and Bridges was keeping them in reserve until more troops from the New Zealand and Australian Division had been landed. McCay then spoke to Bridges directly and informed him that the situation was desperate and if not reinforced the Turks would get behind him. At 17:00, Bridges released the 4th Battalion to McCay who sent them to the south forming on the left of the 8th Battalion along Bolton's Ridge. They arrived just in time to help counter Turkish probing attacks, by the 27th Infantry Regiment, from the south.

At 17:20, McCay signalled Bridges that large numbers of unwounded men were leaving the battlefield and heading for the beaches. This was followed by Maclagan asking for urgent artillery fire support, onto Gun Ridge, as his left was under a heavy attack and at 18:16 Owen reported the left flank was "rapidly" being forced to retire. At dusk, Maclagan made his way to Bridges headquarters and when asked for his opinion replied "It's touch and go. If the Turks come on in mass formation ... I don't think anything can stop them." As it got dark the Turkish artillery ceased firing, and although small arms fire continued on both sides, the effects were limited when firing blind. Darkness also provided the opportunity to start digging more substantial trenches and to resupply the troops with water and ammunition.

The last significant action of the day was at 22:00, south of Lone Pine, when the Turks charged towards Bolton's Ridge. By now, the 8th Battalion had positioned two machine guns to cover their front, which caused devastation amongst the attackers; and, to their left, the 4th Battalion also became involved. When the Turks got to within 50 yd (46 m), the 8th Battalion counter-attacked in a bayonet charge, and the Turks withdrew. The ANZAC defence was aided by Royal Navy searchlights providing illumination. Both sides now waited for the next attack, but the day's events had shattered both formations, and they were no longer in any condition to conduct offensive operations.

== Aftermath ==
By nightfall, around sixteen thousand men had been landed, and the ANZACs had formed a beachhead, although with several undefended sections. It stretched along Bolton's Ridge in the south, across 400 Plateau, to Monash Valley. After a short gap it resumed at Pope's Hill, then at the top of Walker's Ridge. It was not a large beachhead; it was under 2 mi (3.2 km) in length, with a depth around 790 yd (720 m), and in places only a few yards separated the two sides. That evening Birdwood had been ashore to check on the situation, and, satisfied, returned to HMS Queen. Around 21:15 he was asked to return to the beachhead. There he met with his senior officers, who asked him to arrange an evacuation. Unwilling to make that decision on his own, he signalled Hamilton;

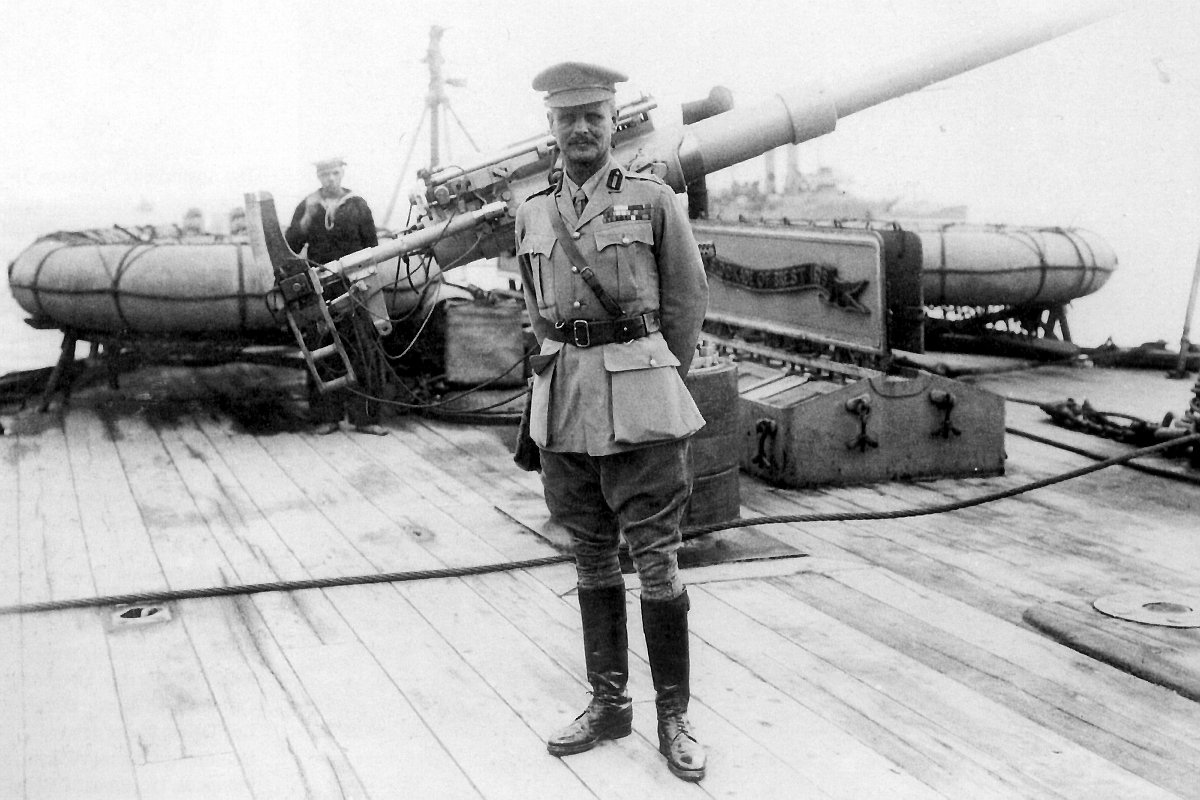
Lieutenant-General William Birdwood, commander of the ANZAC force, aboard ship. Birdwood suggested an evacuation by sea rather than remaining in the cramped and limited beachhead, but was rebuffed.

Both my divisional generals and brigadiers have represented to me that they fear their men are thoroughly demoralised by shrapnel fire to which they have been subjected all day after exhaustion and gallant work in morning. Numbers have dribbled back from the firing line and cannot be collected in this difficult country. Even New Zealand Brigade which has only recently been engaged lost heavily and is to some extent demoralised. If troops are subjected to shellfire again tomorrow morning there is likely to be a fiasco, as I have no fresh troops with which to replace those in firing line. I know my representation is most serious, but if we are to re-embark it must be at once.

Hamilton conferred with his naval commanders, who convinced him an evacuation would be almost impossible, and responded; "dig yourselves right in and stick it out ... dig, dig, dig until you are safe". The survivors had to fight on alone until 28 April when four battalions of the Royal Naval Division were attached to the corps.

On the Turkish side, by that night the 2nd Battalion, 57th Infantry, were on Baby 700, the 3rd Battalion, reduced to only ninety men, were at The Nek, and the 1st Battalion on Mortar Ridge. Just south of them was the 77th Infantry, next were the 27th Infantry opposite 400 Plateau. The last regiment, the 72nd Infantry, were on Battleship Hill. As for manpower, the Turks were in a similar situation to the ANZACs. Of the two regiments most heavily involved, the 57th had been destroyed, and the 27th were exhausted with heavy casualties. Large numbers of the 77th had deserted, and the regiment was in no condition to fight. The 72nd was largely intact, but they were a poorly trained force of Arab conscripts. The III Corps, having to deal with both landings, could not assist as they had no reserves available. It was not until 27 April that the 33rd and 64th infantry regiments arrived to reinforce the Turkish forces. The ANZACs, however, had been unable to achieve their objectives, and therefore dug in. Gallipoli, like the Western Front, turned into a war of attrition. The German commander, Liman von Saunders, was clear about the reasons for the outcome. He wrote that, "on the Turkish side the situation was saved by the immediate and independent action of the 19th Division." The division commander, Kemal, became noted as "the most imaginative, most successful officer to fight on either side" during the campaign. As a commander he was able to get the most out of his troops, typified by his order to the 57th Infantry Regiment; "Men, I am not ordering you to attack. I am ordering you to die. In the time that it takes us to die, other forces and commanders can come and take our place."

In the following days there were several failed attacks and counter-attacks by both sides. The Turks were the first to try during the Second attack on Anzac Cove on 27 April, followed by the ANZACs who tried to advance overnight on 1–2 May. The Turkish Third attack on Anzac Cove, on 19 May, was the worst defeat of them all, with around ten thousand casualties, including three thousand dead. (Note: Moorhead in 1997 claimed there were 5,000 dead.) The next four months consisted of only local or diversionary attacks, until 6 August when the ANZACs, in connection with the Landing at Suvla Bay, attacked Chunuk Bair with only limited success. The Turks never succeeded in driving the Australians and New Zealanders back into the sea. Similarly, the ANZACs never broke out of their beachhead. Instead, in December 1915, after eight months of fighting, they evacuated the peninsula.

=== Casualties ===
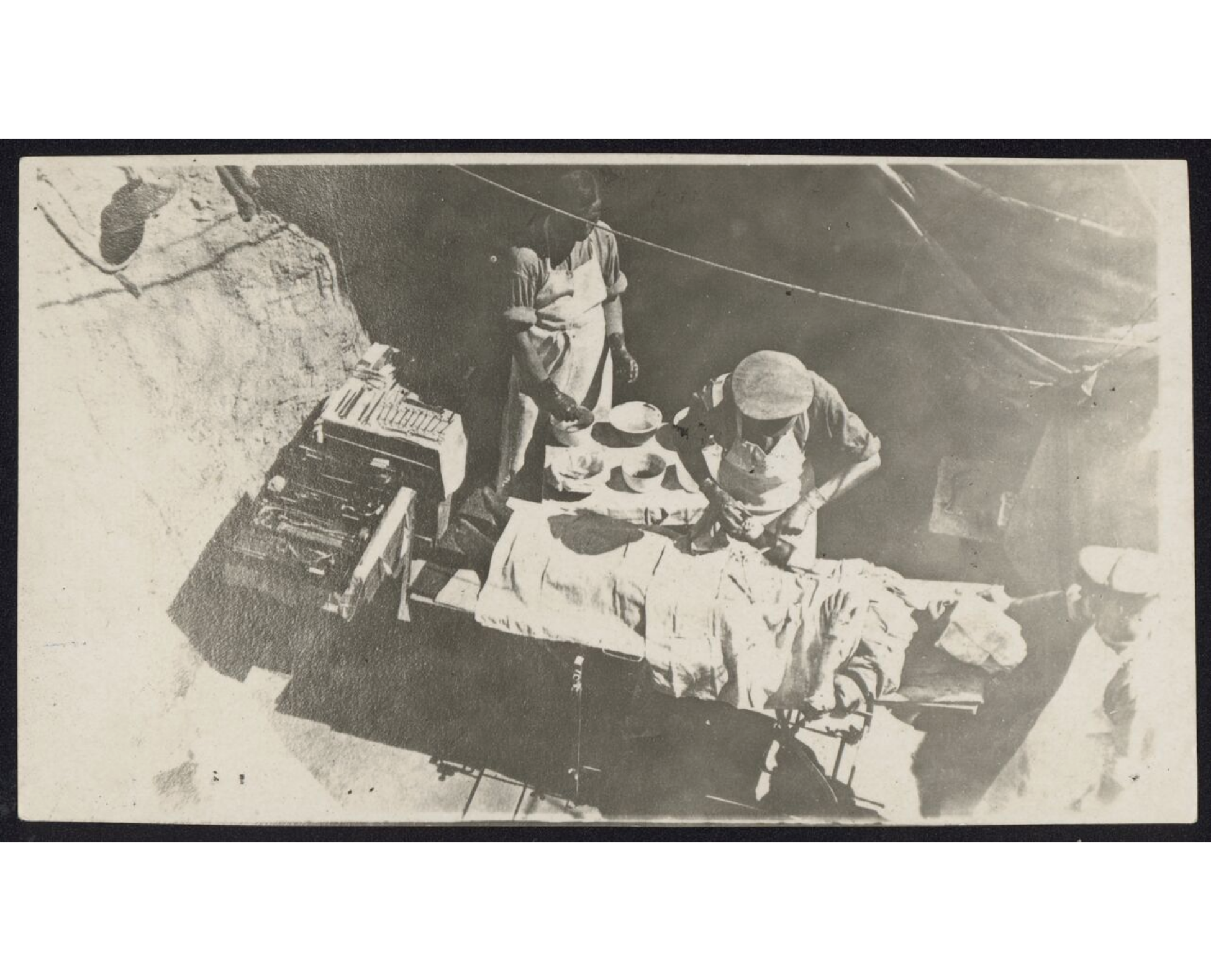
Medical corps in action at Gallipoli, Turkey

The full extent of casualties on that first day is not known. Birdwood, who did not come ashore until late in the day, estimated between three and four hundred dead on the beaches. The New Zealand Ministry for Culture and Heritage claims one in five of the three thousand New Zealanders involved became a casualty. The Australian War Memorial has 860 Australian dead between 25–30 April, and the Australian government estimates 2,000 wounded left Anzac Cove on 25 April, but more wounded were still waiting on the battlefields to be evacuated. The Commonwealth War Graves Commission documents that 754 Australian and 147 New Zealand soldiers died on 25 April 1915. A higher than normal proportion of the ANZAC casualties were from the officer ranks. One theory was that they kept exposing themselves to fire, trying to find out where they were or to locate their troops. Four men were taken prisoner by the Turks.

Private Victor Laidlaw of the 2nd Field Ambulance recorded in his diary the dangers faced in treating the casualties:

28 April I have to report that one of our chaps was killed this day, he was attending the wounded in the trenches and was killed instantly, every day one sees the burials of fallen soldiers, they are all put in one large hole, then the service is held by the chaplain. I was struck this night by a piece of shell, but it only grazed my thigh and didn't hurt at all. I have got the bullets of several kinds of shells, they will be very interesting relics if I get home safely.

Several days later he again describes the work of the field ambulance with the many wounded:

2 May In the evening, we had a very hard nights work, our troops had captured a ridge and of course there were plenty of casualties, we were working right through the night, the most cases I noticed were body injuries, though there was a good many fractures. We had a very anxious time with regard to snipers, several times they fired point blank at our squad which were bringing wounded men back to the base, happily they didn't hit any of our corps. This night though, snipers killed one of the 4th Fld. Amb. men. The Medical service has suffered very severely so far, we don't wear our Red Crosses now as they only make a target for the enemy. At 6 a.m. we were allowed a little time to get something to eat.

It is estimated that the Turkish 27th and 57th infantry regiments lost around 2,000 men, or fifty per cent of their combined strength. The full number of Turkish casualties for the day has not been recorded. During the campaign, 8,708 Australians and 2,721 New Zealanders were killed. The exact number of Turkish dead is not known but has been estimated around 87,000.

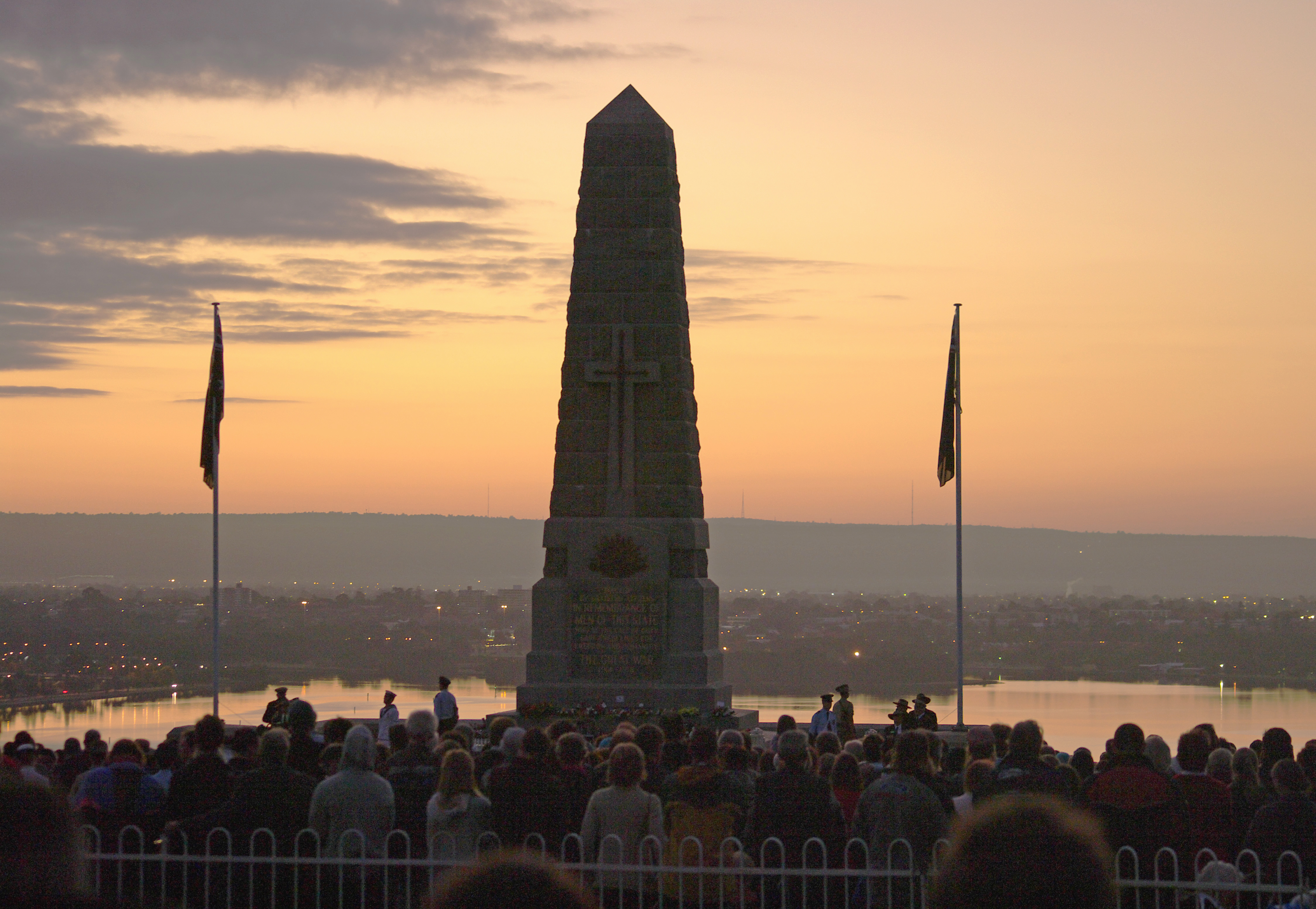
Anzac Day dawn service at the state war memorial, Kings Park, in Western Australia.

=== Anzac Day ===
The anniversary of the landings, 25 April, has since 1916 been recognised in Australia and New Zealand as Anzac Day, now one of their most important national occasions. It does not celebrate a military victory, but instead commemorates all the Australians and New Zealanders "who served and died in all wars, conflicts, and peacekeeping operations" and "the contribution and suffering of all those who have served". Around the country, dawn services are held at war memorials to commemorate those involved. In Australia, at 10:15, another service is held at the Australian War Memorial, which the prime minister and governor general normally attend. The first official dawn services were held in Australia in 1927 and in New Zealand in 1939. Lower-key services are also held in the United Kingdom. In Turkey, large groups of Australians and New Zealanders have begun to gather at Anzac Cove, where in 2005 an estimated 20,000 people attended the service to commemorate the landings. Attendance figures rose to 38,000 in 2012 and 50,000 in 2013.

== See also ==
- List of Australian military personnel killed at Anzac Cove on 25 April 1915
- Landing at Cape Helles
- Gaza War Cemetery
