= Hasan Izzet Pasha =

Hasan Izzet Pasha 1306 (1890)-Sv. 1
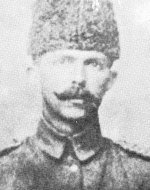
- Hasan Izzet
- Born: 1871; Aksaray, Ottoman Empire
- Died: 3 March 1931 (aged 59–60); Aleppo, Syria
- Military career
- Allegiance: Ottoman Empire
- Service years: Ottoman Empire: 1890 – 18 August 1915
- Rank: Lieutenant general
- Commands: 17th Division, Provisional Division of the Action Army, 18th Division, 1st Division, 9th Division, III Corps, 3rd Army
- Conflicts: 1897 Greco-Turkish War; Balkan Wars; First World War; Turkish War of Independence

Hasan Izzet Pasha (Turkish: Hasan İzzet Paşa, Hasan İzzet Arolat, 1871; Constantinople (Istanbul) – 3 March 1931) was a Turkish general of the Ottoman Empire.

== Early life ==
Hasan Izzet Born in a family of Turkish origin 1871 to mother Süreyya Hanım, and father Ali Muhsin Pasha in Aksaray neighborhood of Istanbul.

He graduated from the Ottoman Military Academy (Mekteb-i Füsûn-u Harbiyye-i Şâhâne) in 1890 and the Staff College (Mekteb-i Erkân-ı Harbiye-i Şâhâne, present day: Harp Akademisi) on 23 March 1893 as a Staff Captain (Erkân-ı Harp Yüzbaşısı).

== Military career ==
He was appointed to the fourth department of the General Staff by the order of Sultan Abdul Hamid II on 14 April 1894. On 7 May 1895, he was promoted to the rank of Senior Captain (Kolağası) and on 12 May 1895, he participated in the military staff excursion to Üsküp (present day: Skopje). On 29 October 1896, he was assigned to the War Academy.

=== 1897 Greco-Turkish War ===
On 21 April 1897, he was promoted to the rank of Major (Binbaşı) and assigned service in the Alasonya Army (Alasonya Ordusu), a field army will attack Elassona area. During the 1897 Greco-Turkish War, he was assigned to the 2nd Neşet Bey Division (İkinci Neşet Bey Fırkası) and took part in the Battle of Domokos (Dömeke Muharebesi). On 17 July 1897, he was called back to Istanbul and appointed in the commander of the Greek Border.

=== Interwar period ===
He was appointed to the inspector of examination of Edirne Military High School (Edirne Askerî İdadisi) on 30 November 1897, and appointed to the teacher of tactics (Artillery, Cavalry, Infantry) of the War Academy on 21 March 1898. He had been in Damascus for the inspection and examination of the Damascus Military High School (Şam Askerî İdadisi). He was promoted to the rank of lieutenant colonel (Kaymakam) on 2 October 1900, to the rank of colonel (Miralay) on 23 April 1905. He was appointed to the fourth department of the General Staff on 26 March 1906.

He went to Romania to observe a military exercise and awarded with a 2nd class order by the Romanian government on 4 August 1907. On 25 June 1908, he was appointed as the member of the military tribunal that was established because of some important affairs. Then he was appointed as the commander of the 17th Division stationed in Siroz (Serez, present day: Serres).

=== 31 March Incident ===
After the 31 March Incident, he was commissioned commander as the commander of the Provisional Division of the Action Army in 1909. On 2 July 1911, he was appointed to the commander of the 1st Division under the command of the I Corps.

=== Balkan Wars ===
During the First Balkan War, he went to Babaeski and was appointed the commander of the 9th Division by the order of the Eastern Army (Şark Ordusu). He took part in battles at Petra (present day: Kayalı village in the central district of Kırklareli Province) on 9–10 October 1912 and Taştabya, Vize and Çatalca. He was promoted to the rank of Mirliva on 19 December 1912. On 21 January 1913, he was appointed the commander of the I Corps (part of the left wing of the Çatalca Army) by proxy. And then he was appointed the commander of the 18th Division on 6 March 1913.

During the Second Balkan War, he commanded the II Corps under the Çatalca Army commanded directly by Ahmet Izzet Pasha and took part in the advance to Adrianople. After the armistice, on 24 December 1913, he was appointed as the commander of the III Corps.

=== World War ===
After the 1914 mobilization of World War I, Sultan Mehmed V asked him to be the commander of the Third Army. He was the commander during Bergmann Offensive. He feared in the background of the ill and rapid changes in the Army leadership during the preparations for the Battle of Sarikamish. He also opposed Enver Pasha to attack prematurely during Battle of Sarikamish. He gave his post as commander of the Third Army on 18 December 1914. He later participated in the Turkish War of Independence where he fought on the western front against the Greeks.

== Medals and decorations ==
- Order of the Medjidie 5th classe (8 September 1894)
- Order of the Osmanî 4th classe (18 September 1899)
- Golden Medal of Liakat (1900)
- Rumanian Order, 2nd class (4 August 1907)
- Order of the Medjidie 4th class (21 December 1909)
- Bulgarian Order (1910) (verliehen von Ferdinand I. während seines Istanbul Besuches)

== Military ranks ==
- Captain (Yüzbaşı), 24 March 1893
- Senior Captain (Kolağası), 7 May 1895
- Major (Binbaşı), 21 April 1897
- Lieutenant colonel (Kaymakam), 2 October 1900
- Colonel (Miralay), 23 April 1905
- Mirliva, 19 December 1912
- Ferik, 1 October 1915

== Bibliography ==
- The Encyclopædia Britannica: Vol XXXII, 1922, by Hugh Chisholm, page 803.
