= Third Army (Ottoman Empire) =

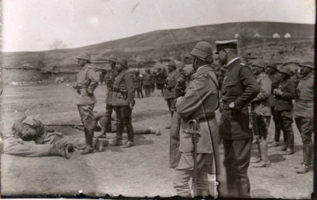
- Before the Battle of Sarikamish, Enver and Feldmann inspecting the units
- Active: August 5, 1914 – October 15, 1918
- Country: Ottoman Empire
- Type: Field Army
- Engagements: Balkan Wars; Caucasus Campaign (World War I)

Commanders
- Notable commanders: Hasan Izzet Pasha (November 1 – December 19, 1914); Enver Pasha (December 22, 1914 – January 10, 1915); Hafiz Hakki Pasha (January 12– February 13, 1915); Mahmud Kâmil Pasha (February 13, 1915 – February 23, 1915); Abdul Kerim Pasha (February 23, 1915 – February 16, 1916); Vehib Pasha (February 1916 – June 1918); Esad Pasha (June–October 1918)

The Third Army was originally established in Skopje and later defended the northeastern provinces of the Ottoman Empire. Its initial headquarters was at Salonica, where it formed the core of the military forces that supported the Young Turk Revolution of 1908. Many of its officers who participated in the Revolution, including Enver Pasha and Mustafa Kemal Atatürk, rose to fame and power.

By 1911, the Army had been moved to Erzincan in northeastern Anatolia, and with the onset of World War I, it was moved to Erzurum. During the war, it fought against the Russian Caucasus Army, Armenian volunteer units and behind the lines dealt with the Armenian Resistance within its designated area. During this period, the Battle of Sarikamish, Battle of Koprukoy and the Battle of Erzurum were significant engagements. The army's headquarters was moved to Susehir (a town near Sivas) after the disastrous Battle of Erzurum, and by late 1916 the army lacked any offensive capability. After the Russian Revolution, the Russian Caucasus Army disintegrated.

Between 1917 and 1918 it advanced against forces of the Armenian national liberation movement established by Armenian Congress of Eastern Armenians which became the Armenian Army with the declaration of the Democratic Republic of Armenia. During this period, the Third Army engaged the Armenian forces at Sardarapat, Abaran, and Karakilisa.

== Formations ==
=== Order of Battle, 1908 ===
After the Young Turk Revolution and the establishment of the Second Constitutional Era on July 3, 1908, the new government initiated a major military reform. Army headquarters were modernized. Its operational area was Western Rumelia, and it had units in Europe (Albania, Kosovo, Macedonia) and Minor Asia (Aydın). It commanded the following active divisions: The Third Army also had inspectorate functions for twelve Redif (reserve) divisions:

- Third Army
  - 5th Infantry Division (Beşinci Fırka)
  - 6th Infantry Division (Altıncı Fırka)
  - 17th Infantry Division (On Yedinci Fırka)
  - 18th Infantry Division (On Sekizinci Fırka)
  - 3rd Cavalry Division (Üçüncü Süvari Fırkası)
  - Fortress Artillery Battalion x 4
- Redif divisions of the Third Army (name of the division denotes its location)
  - 9th Monastir Reserve Infantry Division (Dokuzuncu Manastır Redif Fırkası)
  - 10th Köprülü Reserve Infantry Division (Onuncu Köprülü Redif Fırkası)
  - 11th Salonika Reserve Infantry Division (On Birinci Selânik Redif Fırkası)
  - 12th Aydın Reserve Infantry Division (On İkinci Aydın Redif Fırkası)
  - 28th Üsküp Reserve Infantry Division (Yirmi Sekizinci Üsküp Redif Fırkası)
  - 29th Pirştine Reserve Infantry Division (Yirmi Dokuzuncu Pirştine Redif Fırkası)
  - 30th Pirzerin Reserve Infantry Division (Otuzuncu Pirzerin Redif Fırkası)
  - 31st Serez Reserve Infantry Division (Otuz Birinci Serez Redif Fırkası)
  - 32nd Berat Reserve Infantry Division (Otuz İkinci Berat Redif Fırkası)
  - 33rd Görüce Reserve Infantry Division (Otuz Üçüncü Görüce Redif Fırkası)
  - 34th Debre-i Bala Reserve Infantry Division (Otuz Dördüncü Debre-i Bala Redif Fırkası)
  - 54th Gevgili Reserve Infantry Division (Elli Dördüncü Gevgili Redif Fırkası)

=== Order of Battle, 1911 ===
With further reorganizations of the Ottoman Army, to include the creation of corps level headquarters, by 1911 the Army was headquartered in Erzincan. The Army before the First Balkan War in 1911 was structured as such:

- Army Headquarters, Erzincan
- IX Corps, Erzurum
  - 28th Infantry Division, Erzurum
  - 29th Infantry Division, Bayburt
- X Corps, Erzincan
  - 30th Infantry Division, Erzincan
  - 31st Infantry Division, Erzincan
  - 32nd Infantry Division, Mamuret'ül Aziz
- XI Corps, Van
  - 33rd Infantry Division, Van
  - 34th Infantry Division, Muş
- 1st Tribal Cavalry Division, Erzurum
  - 39th Cavalry Regiment, Erzurum
  - 1st Tribal Cavalry Regiment, Erzurum
  - 2nd Tribal Cavalry Regiment, Kiğı
  - 3rd Tribal Cavalry Regiment, Varto
  - 4th Tribal Cavalry Regiment, Hınıs
  - 5th Tribal Cavalry Regiment, Hasankale
  - 6th Tribal Cavalry Regiment, Sivas
- 2nd Tribal Cavalry Division, Kara Kilise
  - 24th Cavalry Regiment, Kara Kilise
  - 7th Tribal Cavalry Regiment, Eleşkirt
  - 8th Tribal Cavalry Regiment, Kara Kilise
  - 9th Tribal Cavalry Regiment, Kara Kilise
  - 10th Tribal Cavalry Regiment, Kara Kilise
  - 11th Tribal Cavalry Regiment, Kara Kilise
  - 12th Tribal Cavalry Regiment, Tutak
  - 13th Tribal Cavalry Regiment, Diyadin
  - 14th Tribal Cavalry Regiment, Beyazıt
- 3rd Tribal Cavalry Division, Erdiş
  - 25th Cavalry Regiment, Erdiş
  - 15th Tribal Cavalry Regiment, Kop
  - 16th Tribal Cavalry Regiment, Erdiş
  - 17th Tribal Cavalry Regiment, Erdiş
  - 18th Tribal Cavalry Regiment, Saray
  - 19th Tribal Cavalry Regiment, Başkale
- 4th Tribal Cavalry Division, Mardin
  - 20th Cavalry Regiment, Mardin
  - 20th Tribal Cavalry Regiment, Cezire-i İbn-i Ömer
  - 21st Tribal Cavalry Regiment, Mardin
  - 22nd Tribal Cavalry Regiment, Mardin
  - 23rd Tribal Cavalry Regiment, Viranşehir
  - 24th Tribal Cavalry Regiment, Siverek

=== Order of Battle, 1914 ===
The acting commander Hasan Izzet Pasha (October–December 1914) and Enver Pasha (December 1914 – January 1915). Prior to Sarikamish, the Army consisted of 118,660 troops in the following units and commanders:

- IX Corps - Ahmed Fevzi Pasha
  - 17th Infantry Division
  - 28th Infantry Division
  - 29th Infantry Division
- X Corps - Hafiz Hakki Pasha
  - 30th Infantry Division
  - 31st Infantry Division
  - 32nd Infantry Division
- XI Corps - Abdulkerim Pasha
  - 18th Infantry Division
  - 33rd Infantry Division
  - 34th Infantry Division
  - 2nd Cavalry Brigade
  - Van Cavalry Brigade

Following the battle of Sarikamish, it was reduced to some 20,000 men with loss of all guns and heavy equipment.

=== Order of Battle, 1915 ===
The acting commander Hafiz Hakki Pasha (January 12 – February 1915) died of typhus in Erzerum in 1915. Mahmut Kamil Paşa (February 1915 – February 1916) took the command.

In 1915 the 3rd Army was slowly brought back up to strength. In July of that year, it was strong enough to win a victory against the Russians at Malazgirt. Later in the year the losses the Ottomans took at Gallipoli diverted manpower away from the 3rd Army, and it would never again reach its normal strength, and numbered 60,000 in the fall of 1915.

=== Order of Battle, 1916 ===
The acting commander Vehip Pasha (February 1916–June 1918).

- IX Corps
  - 17th Infantry Division
  - 28th Infantry Division
  - 29th Infantry Division
- X Corps
  - 30th Infantry Division
  - 31st Infantry Division
  - 32nd Infantry Division
- XI Corps
  - 18th Infantry Division
  - 33rd Infantry Division
  - 34th Infantry Division
  - 36th Infantry Division
  - 37th Infantry Division

also: 2nd Cavalry Division, 15-20 battalions of frontier guards and gendarmes, and a few thousand Kurdish irregular.

When the Russians launched their surprise offensive in January 1916, culminating in the Battle of Koprukoy the army numbered 65,000 men and 100 guns. The army lost nearly 15,000 killed, wounded, for frozen, and about 5,000 prisoners. There were also about an estimated 5,000 deserters. About 20-30 guns were lost. The XI Corps took the heaviest losses, about 70% of its effective strength. The army fell back on the fortified city of Erzurum, its base.

The army could expect reinforcements from the 1st and 2nd Armies after their victory at Gallipoli, but due to the poor nature of the Ottoman railroad it was going to take time for them to reach the 3rd Army. The army numbered about 50,000 troops. The army was also short machine guns and needed more artillery to properly defend the city. Mahmut Kamil returned from leave and resumed command of the army from Abdul Kerim.

The Russians stormed the city, penetrating its outer defenses, forcing Mahmut Kamil to abandon the city and retreat to the west. The army numbered perhaps 25,000 men and 30 or 40 guns. Morale was very poor. Mahmut Kamil was replaced by Vehip Pasa. The army continued to retreat, losing Trebizond on the coast. A counterattack by the army was unable to retake the city.

In July 1916 the Russians launched another series of attacks on the 3rd Army, costing the army about 30% of its strength and leaving its morale badly shaken. By September 1916 the army was very weak and desertions were a major problem. By October there were an estimated 50,000 deserters in the rear of the army. The 3rd Army could not play any role in the Ottoman offensives planned for that fall.

=== Order of Battle, 1917 ===
The acting commander Vehib Pasha (February 1916–June 1918).

The army underwent a major reorganization at the winter of 1916. At the turn of 1917, it was reorganized as follows:

- I Caucasian Corps
  - 9th Caucasian Division
  - 10th Caucasian Division
  - 36th Caucasian Division
- II Caucasian corps
  - 5th Caucasian Division
  - 11th Caucasian Division
  - 37th Caucasian Division

Over the winter of 1916–17, the Russian Revolution effectively stopped the Russian Army in its tracks, and eventually caused the Russian Army in the Caucasus to melt away.

The Third Army later advanced and recaptured in 1917 and 1918 all that it had lost, and even advanced to and captured Kars, which had been lost to the Russians in 1877. These actions achieved what the Ottomans had wanted at Brest-Litovsk by regaining the Ottoman Empire's prewar boundaries under the Treaty of Batum.
