= Eastern Army =

Eastern Army may refer to:

- Eastern Army (Japan), an active army of the Japan Ground Self-Defense Force
- Eastern Army (Ottoman Empire), active during the First Balkan War
- Eastern Army (United Kingdom), active during the Burma Campaign of the Second World War
- Eastern Army (Spain), active during the Spanish Civil War
- The forces of the Tokugawa shogunate during the Siege of Osaka
