= III Corps (Ottoman Empire) =

III Corps Üçüncü Kolordu
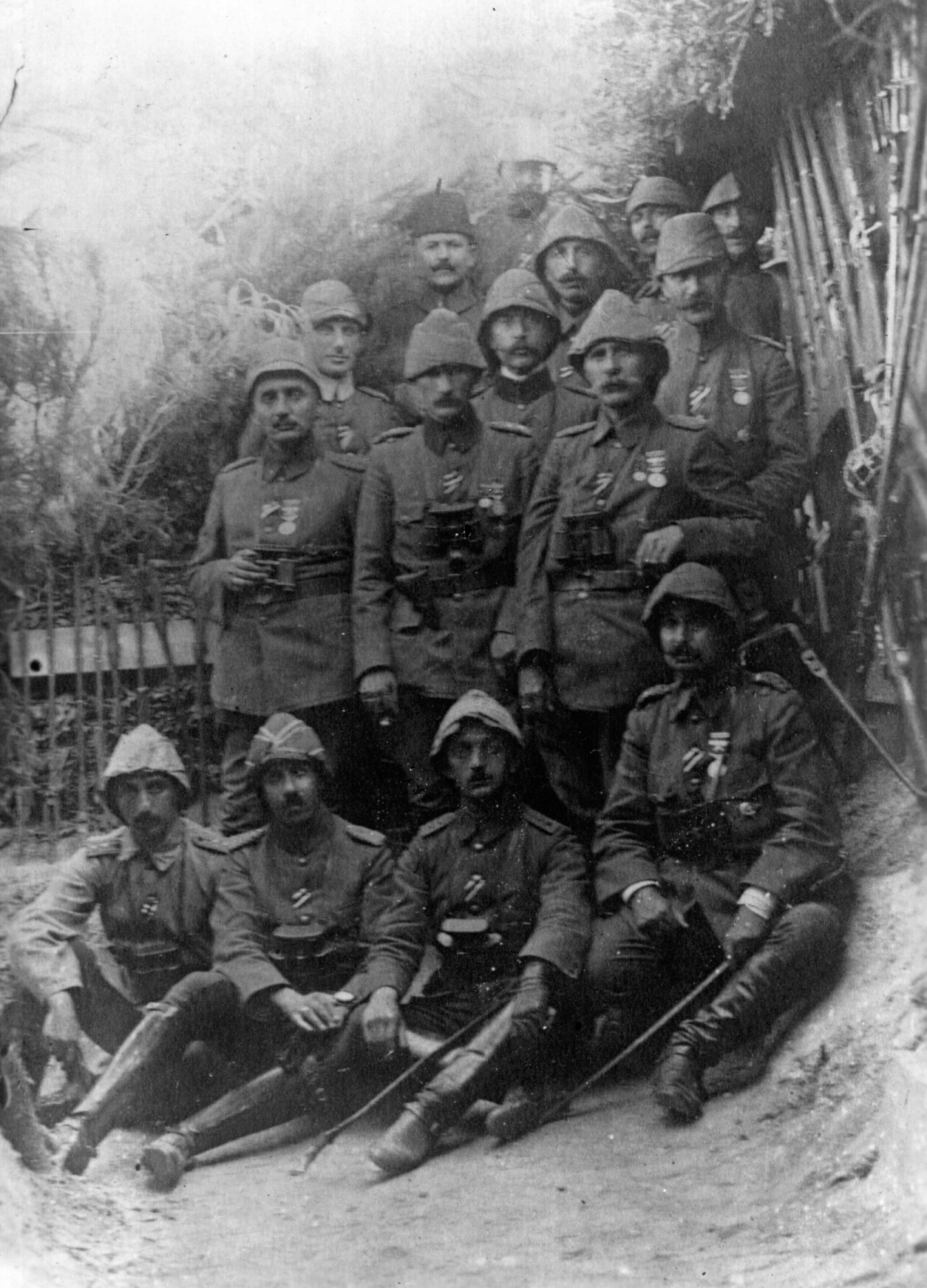
- Esad Pasha and his men: from left to right: Sitting: Binbaşı Haydar Bey, Binbaşı Mehmed Hulusi Bey, Yüzbaşı Mehmed Nazim Bey, unknown, First row: Miralay Rushidi Bey, Miralay Mustafa Kemal Bey, Mirliva Esad Pasha, Middle row: Kaymakam Wilhelm Willmer, unknown, Milaray Hans Kannengiesser, Back row: Binbaşı Ohrili Kemal Bey, Kaymakam Fahreddin Bey, Binbaşı Izzeddin Bey
- Active: 1911 – 1920
- Country: Ottoman Empire
- Type: Corps
- Garrison/HQ: Kırk Kilise, Tekfur Dağı
- Patron: Ottoman Sultan
- Engagements: Gallipoli Campaign (World War I); Sinai and Palestine Campaign (World War I); Battle of Jerusalem; Battle of Megiddo

Commanders
- Notable commanders: Mirliva Mahmud Muhtar Pasha (Balkan Wars); Mirliva Esad Pasha; Miralay Ismet Bey (June 20, 1917-October 24, 1918); Ali Rıza Pasha

The III Corps of the Ottoman Empire (Turkish:3üncü Kolordu or Üçüncü Kolordu) was one of the corps of the Ottoman Army. It was formed in the early 20th century during Ottoman military reforms.

It lives on today as the 3rd Corps (Turkey), retained and reorganised as part of the post-1922 Turkish Land Forces.

== Formation ==
=== Order of Battle, 1911 ===
With further reorganizations of the Ottoman Army, to include the creation of corps level headquarters, by 1911 the III Corps was headquartered in Kırk Kilise. The Corps before the First Balkan War in 1911 was structured as such:

- III Corps, Kırk Kilise
  - 7th Infantry Division, Kırk Kilise (Miralay Hilmi)
    - 19th Infantry Regiment, Yemen
    - 20th Infantry Regiment, Kırk Kilise
    - 21st Infantry Regiment, Tırnovacık
    - 7th Rifle Battalion, Yemen
    - 7th Field Artillery Regiment, Kırk Kilise
    - 7th Division Band, Kırk Kilise
  - 8th Infantry Division, Çorlu (Mirliva Celâl Pasha)
    - 22nd Infantry Regiment, Çorlu
    - 23rd Infantry Regiment, Saray
    - 24th Infantry Regiment, Samakof
    - 8th Rifle Battalion, Çorlu
    - 8th Field Artillery Regiment, Çorlu
    - 8th Division Band, Çorlu
  - 9th Infantry Division, Babaeski (Miralay Kadri)
    - 25th Infantry Regiment, Yemen
    - 26th Infantry Regiment, Babaeski
    - 27th Infantry Regiment, Lüleburgaz
    - 9th Rifle Battalion, Yemen
    - 9th Field Artillery Regiment, Lüleburgaz
    - 9th Division Band, Babaeski
- Units of III Corps
- 3rd Rifle Regiment, Kırk Kilise
- 3rd Cavalry Brigade, Kırk Kilise
  - 7th Cavalry Regiment, Çorlu
  - 8th Cavalry Regiment, Kırk Kilise
  - 10th Cavalry Regiment, Marmara Ereğlisi
- 2nd Mountain Artillery Battalion, Marmara Ereğlisi
- 3rd Mountain Artillery Battalion, Marmara Ereğlisi
- 2nd Field Howitzer Battalion, Adrianople
- 3rd Engineer Battalion, Adrianople
- 2nd Transport Battalion, Kırk Kilise
- Border companies x 2

== Balkan Wars ==
=== Order of Battle, October 17, 1912 ===
On October 17, 1912, the corps was structured as follows:

- III Corps (Thrace, under the command of the Eastern Army)
  - 7th Division, 8th Division, 9th Division
  - Afyon Karahisar Redif Division

=== Order of Battle, October 29, 1912 ===
On October 29, 1912, the corps was structured as follows:

- III Corps (Thrace, under the command of the Second Eastern Army)
  - 7th Division, 8th Division, 9th Division
  - Konya Redif Division, Amasya Redif Division

=== Order of Battle, November 17, 1912 ===
On November 17, 1912, the corps was structured as follows:

- III Corps (Thrace, under the command of the Chataldja Army)
  - 7th Division, 8th Division, 9th Division
  - South Wing Detachment
- III Provisional Reserve Corps
  - Selimiye Redif Division, Fatih Redif Division, Afyon Redif Division

=== Order of Battle, March 25, 1913 ===
On March 25, 1913, the corps was structured as follows:

- III Provisional Reserve Corps (Thrace, under the command of the Chataldja Army)
  - 3rd Division
  - Yozgat Redif Division
- III Corps (Thrace, under the command of the Chataldja Army)
  - 7th Division, 8th Division, 9th Division

=== Order of Battle, July 1913 ===
- III Corps
  - 7th Division, 8th Division, 9th Division

== World War I ==
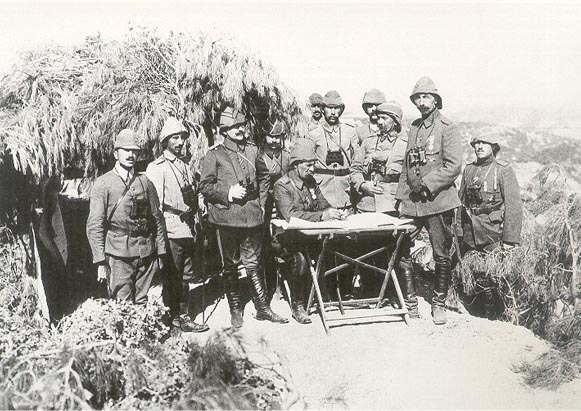
A group of Ottoman commanders: the front row (from right): Binbaşı Hulusi Bey, Yüzbaşı Mehmed Nazim Bey; standing (from right): III Corps Commander Mirliva Esad Pasha, Suvla Group Commander Miralay Mustafa Kemal Bey, Miralay Rushdi Bey; the rear row (from right): Col. Hans Kannengiesser, Wilhelm Willmer, Kaymakam Fahreddin Bey, Binbaşı Ohrili Kemal Bey, Binbaşı Izzeddin Bey

=== Order of Battle, August 1914, November 1914 ===
In August 1914, November 1914, the corps was structured as follows:

- III Corps (Thrace)
  - 7th Division, 8th Division, 9th Division

=== Order of Battle, April 1915 ===
In late April 1915, the corps was structured as follows:

- III Corps (Gallipoli)
  - 7th Division, 9th Division, 19th Division

=== Order of Battle, Late Summer 1915, January 1916 ===
In late Summer 1915, January 1916, the corps was structured as follows:

- III Corps (Gallipoli)
  - 7th Division, 8th Division, 9th Division, 19th Division

=== Order of Battle, August 1916 ===
In August 1916, the corps was structured as follows:

- III Corps (Caucasus)
  - 1st Division, 7th Division, 14th Division, 53rd Division

=== Order of Battle, August 1917 ===
In August 1917, the corps was structured as follows:

- III Corps (Syria)
  - 24th Division, 50th Division

=== Order of Battle, January 1918 ===
In January 1918, the corps was structured as follows:

- III Corps (Palestine)
  - 1st Division, 19th Division, 24th Division

=== Order of Battle, September 1918 ===
In September 1918, the corps was structured as follows:

- III Corps (Palestine)
  - 1st Division, 11th Division

The Ottoman III Corps has been described as consisting of 7th, 8th and 9th Infantry Divisions from the beginning of the war to late April 1915 when the 19th Infantry Division was added while it was serving at Gallipoli. In August 1916 while serving in the Caucasus it is said to have consisted of 1st, 7th, 14th and 53rd Infantry Divisions and by August 1917 it formed part of the 7th Army in Palestine and made up of the 224th and 50th Infantry Divisions. By January 1918 it consisted of 1st, 19th and 24th Infantry Divisions with the 3rd Cavalry Division added in June 1918.

== After Mudros ==
=== Order of Battle, November 1918 ===
In November 1918, the corps was structured as follows:

- III Corps (Syria)
  - 11th Division, 24th Division

=== Order of Battle, January 1919 ===
In January 1919, the corps was structured as follows:

- III Corps (Anatolia, Sivas, Commander: Miralay Selâhaddin Bey)
  - 15th Division (Samsun)
    - 9th Infantry Regiment, 13th Infantry Regiment, 15th Infantry Regiment
  - 5th Caucasian Division (Trabzon)
    - 13th Infantry Regiment, 45th Infantry Regiment, 56th Infantry Regiment

== See also ==
- Central Army (Turkey)
