= Hans Kannengiesser =

German military officer

Hans Kannengiesser (1868–1945) was a German military officer during World War I. He was among the German advisors to the Ottoman Empire when the First World War broke out. As opposed to being a liaison officer with the Ottoman Army, he commanded Ottoman troops in the field, including the Ottoman 9th Division. The 9th Division was part of the Fifth Army, which was commanded during part of the Gallipoli campaign by German general Otto Liman von Sanders.

Early in the battle he was wounded by a machine gun bullet to the chest first by the New Zealanders. On September 7 he had recovered enough to return to the front. After the war, Kannengiesser wrote a book about the battle of Gallipoli "The Campaign in Gallipoli".
