= Mahmud Kâmil Pasha =

Ottoman general

Mahmud Kâmil Pasha 1315 (1899) P.-8
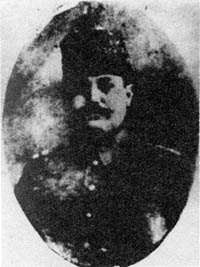
- Mahmud Kâmil Pasha
- Born: 1880; Heleb (Aleppo), Ottoman Empire
- Died: June 1922 (aged 41–42); Constantinople (Istanbul), Ottoman Empire
- Military career
- Allegiance: Ottoman Empire
- Service years: Ottoman: 1901 – June 1922
- Rank: Mirliva
- Commands: Second Army, Third Army, Fifth Army
- Conflicts: Balkan Wars; First World War

Mahmud Kâmil Pasha (1880 – 28 November 1922) was a general of the Ottoman Army. He was born in Haleb (Aleppo) and died in Istanbul.

== Career ==
Mahmud Kamil was born in Halab to a notable Sunni Arab family. On 22 December 1914, Kâmil was appointed as the commander of the Second Army. On 17 February 1915, he was appointed as the commander of the 3rd Army in the eastern Anatolia, later assigned to 5th Army. During this time, he participated in the Armenian genocide. He issued directives ordering the deportation of all of the remaining Armenians in the city of Erzurum. He issued special orders not to spare the old, sick, or pregnant women.

Kâmil commanded the 3rd Army until the fall of the key fortress of Erzurum in February 1916, after which he was relieved of command. After the armistice of Mudros the allied administration established with the occupation of Constantinople arrested him and become one of the Malta exiles. He was later released. In June 1922, he resigned due to an illness. He killed himself later that year.
