= Second Eastern Army =

- Active: October 29-November 7, 1912
- Country: Ottoman Empire
- Type: Field Army
- Patron: Sultans of the Ottoman Empire

Commanders
- Notable commanders: Ferik Hamdi Pasha

The Second Eastern Army of the Ottoman Empire (Turkish: İkinci Şark Ordusu) was one of the field armies of the Ottoman Army. It was formed during the initial phase of the First Balkan War. It confronted Bulgarian forces. It was formed from units of reorganized Eastern Army on October 29, 1912.

== Order of battle ==
=== October 29, 1912 ===
On October 29, 1912, the army was structured as follows:

- Second Eastern Army HQ: Ferik Hamdi Pasha
  - III Corps (commanded by Mirliva Mahmud Muhtar Pasha)
  - VII Provisional Corps
  - VIII Provisional Corps
