= XI Corps (Ottoman Empire) =

XI Corps On Birinci Kolordu
- Active: 1911–
- Country: Ottoman Empire
- Type: Corps
- Garrison/HQ: Van, Ma'murat-ül Aziz
- Patron: Ottoman Sultan
- Engagements: Caucasus Campaign (World War I); Battle of Sarikamish

Commanders
- Notable commanders: Mirliva Galip Pasha; Mirliva Abdülkerim Pasha; Miralay Selâhattin Âdil Bey (1916-October 20, 1916)

The XI Corps of the Ottoman Empire (Turkish: 11 nci Kolordu or On Birinci Kolordu) was one of the corps of the Ottoman Army. It was formed in the early 20th century during Ottoman military reforms.

== Formation ==
With further reorganizations of the Ottoman Army, to include the creation of corps level headquarters, by 1911 the XI Corps was headquartered in Van. The Corps before the First Balkan War in 1911 was structured as such:

- XI Corps, Van
  - 33rd Infantry Division, Van
    - 88th Infantry Regiment, Van
    - 89th Infantry Regiment, Başkale
    - 90th Infantry Regiment, Bayezit
    - 33rd Rifle Battalion, Van
    - 33rd Division Band, Van
  - 34th Infantry Division, Muş
    - 91st Infantry Regiment, Muş
    - 92nd Infantry Regiment, Malazgirt
    - 93rd Infantry Regiment, Kara Kilise
    - 34th Rifle Battalion, Yemen
    - 34th Division Band, Muş
- Units of IX Corps
- 23rd Cavalry Regiment, Van
- 21st Field Artillery Battalion, Van
- 11th Transport Battalion, Van
- 22nd Mountain Artillery Battalion
- Border companies x 8

== Balkan Wars ==
=== Order of Battle, July 1913 ===
- XI Corps (Caucasus)
  - 34th Division

== World War I ==
=== Order of Battle, August 1914, November 1914, April 1915, Late Summer 1915, January 1916, August 1916 ===
In August 1914, November 1914, Late April 1915, Summer 1915, January 1916, August 1916, the corps was structured as follows:

- XI Corps (Caucasus)
  - 18th Division, 33rd Division, 34th Division
