= X Corps (Ottoman Empire) =

X Corps Onuncu Kolordu
- Active: 1911–
- Country: Ottoman Empire
- Type: Corps
- Garrison/HQ: Erzincan, Sivas
- Patron: Ottoman Sultan
- Engagements: Battle of Şarköy (First Balkan War); Caucasus Campaign (World War I); Battle of Sarikamish

Commanders
- Notable commanders: Mirliva Ziya Pasha; Miralay Hafiz Hakki Bey; Mirliva Yusuf Izzet Pasha (November 1914-1916)

The X Corps of the Ottoman Empire (Turkish: 10 ncu Kolordu or Onuncu Kolordu) was one of the corps of the Ottoman Army. It was formed in the early 20th century during Ottoman military reforms.

== Formation ==
=== Order of Battle, 1911 ===
With further reorganizations of the Ottoman Army, to include the creation of corps level headquarters, by 1911 the X Corps was headquartered in Erzincan. The Corps before the First Balkan War in 1911 was structured as such:

- X Corps, Erzincan
  - 30th Infantry Division, Erzincan
    - 88th Infantry Regiment, Erzincan
    - 89th Infantry Regiment, Erzincan
    - 90th Infantry Regiment, Erzincan
    - 30th Rifle Battalion, Yemen
    - 30th Field Artillery Regiment, Erzincan
    - 30th Division Band, Erzincan
  - 31st Infantry Division, Erzincan
    - 91st Infantry Regiment, Siirt
    - 92nd Infantry Regiment, Bitlis
    - 93rd Infantry Regiment, Sivas
    - 31st Rifle Battalion, Erzincan
    - 31st Division Band, Erzincan
  - 32nd Infantry Division, Ma'murat-ül Aziz
    - 94th Infantry Regiment, Diyâr-ı Bekir
    - 95th Infantry Regiment, Ma'murat-ül Aziz
    - 96th Infantry Regiment, Dersim
    - 32nd Rifle Battalion, Erzıncan
    - 32nd Field Artillery Regiment, Erzincan
    - 32nd Division Band, Ma'murat-ül Aziz
- Units of IX Corps
- 19th Cavalry Regiment, Erzincan
- 20th Cavalry Regiment, Diyâr-ı Bekir
- 9th Engineer Battalion, Erzincan
- 9th Transport Battalion, Erzincan
- Medical Detachment, Erzincan

== Balkan Wars ==
=== Order of Battle, January 7, 1913 ===
On January 7, 1913, the Provisional X Corps was structured as follows:

- X Corps
  - 31st Division
  - 32nd Division
  - Mamuretülaziz Redif Division
  - 30th Field Artillery Regiment
  - Independent Schneider Artillery Battalion
  - Mountain Howitzer Battalion
  - 5th Cavalry Regiment
  - Tribal Cavalry Division
  - Trains and Ammunition Columns

=== Order of Battle, March 25, 1913 ===
On March 25, 1913, the corps was structured as follows:

- X Corps (Thrace, under the command of the Chataldja Army)
  - 4th Division, 31st Division
  - Amasya Redif Division
  - Independent Cavalry Brigade

=== Order of Battle, July 1913 ===
- X Corps (Gallipoli Army)
  - 4th Division, 31st Division, Aziz Infantry Division

== World War I ==
=== Order of Battle, August 1914, November 1914, ate April 1915, Late Summer 1915, January 1916, August 1916 ===
In November 1914, Late April 1915, Late Summer 1915, January 1916, August 1916, the corps was structured as follows:

- X Corps (Caucasus)
  - 30th Division, 31st Division, 32nd Division
