= IV Corps (Ottoman Empire) =

IV Corps Dördüncü Kolordu
- Active: 1911–end World War I
- Country: Ottoman Empire
- Type: Corps
- Garrison/HQ: Adrianople, Smyrna
- Patron: Sultans of the Ottoman Empire
- Engagements: Gallipoli Campaign (World War I)

Commanders
- Notable commanders: Mirliva Pertev Pasha; Miralay İsmet Bey (January 12-May 1, 1917); Mirliva Ali İhsan Pasha (October 1917-July 1918); Miralay Selâhattin Bey

The IV Corps of the Ottoman Empire (Turkish: 4 ncü Kolordu or Dördüncü Kolordu) was one of the corps of the Ottoman Army. It was formed in the early 20th century during Ottoman military reforms. It was disbanded at the end of World War I.

== Formation ==
=== Order of Battle, 1911 ===
With further reorganizations of the Ottoman Army, to include the creation of corps level headquarters, by 1911 the IV Corps was headquartered in Adrianople. The Corps before the First Balkan War in 1911 was structured as such:

- IV Corps, Harbiye, Adrianople (Ferik Ahmet Abuk Pasha)
  - 10th Infantry Division, Adrianople (Mirliva Mehmet Pasha)
    - 28th Infantry Regiment, Adrianople
    - 29th Infantry Regiment, Cisr-i Mustafa Paşa
    - 30th Infantry Regiment, Adrianople
    - 10th Rifle Battalion, Adrianople
    - 10th Field Artillery Regiment, Adrianople
    - 10th Division Band, Adrianople
  - 11th Infantry Division, Dedeağaç
    - 31st Infantry Regiment, Adrianople
    - 32nd Infantry Regiment, Dedeağaç
    - 33rd Infantry Regiment, Dedeağaç
    - 11th Rifle Battalion, Dedeağaç
    - 11th Field Artillery Regiment, Dedeağaç
    - 11th Division Band, Dedeağaç
  - 12th Infantry Division, Gümülcine
    - 34th Infantry Regiment, Yemen
    - 35th Infantry Regiment, İskeçe
    - 36th Infantry Regiment, Kırcaali
    - 12th Rifle Battalion, Gümlücine
    - 12th Field Artillery Regiment, Adrianople
    - 12th Division Band, Gümlücine
- Units of IV Corps
- 4th Rifle Regiment, Yemen
- 4th Cavalry Brigade, Adrianople
  - 9th Cavalry Regiment, Dimetoka
  - 11th Cavalry Regiment, Adrianople
  - 12th Cavalry Regiment, Adrianople
- 5th Cavalry Brigade, Adrianople
  - 1st Cavalry Regiment, Adrianople
  - 2nd Cavalry Regiment, Adrianople
- 5th Field Howitzer Battalion, Adrianople
- 2nd Horse Artillery Battalion, Adrianople
- 5th Mountain Artillery Battalion, Kırcaali
- 4th Engineer Battalion, Adrianople
- 4th Transport Battalion, Adrianople
- Border companies x 3
- Medical Detachment
- Adrianople Fortified Zone Command, Adrianople
  - 6th Heavy Artillery Regiment, Adrianople
  - 7th Heavy Artillery Regiment, Adrianople
  - 8th Heavy Artillery Regiment, Adrianople
  - 9th Heavy Artillery Regiment, Adrianople
  - Heavy Field Howitzer Battalion, Adrianople
  - Engineer Battalion, Adrianople
  - Machine-Gun companies x 5

== Balkan Wars ==
=== Order of Battle, October 17, 1912 ===
On October 17, 1912, the corps was structured as follows:

- IV Provisional Corps (Thrace, under the command of the Eastern Army)
  - 12th Division
  - Izmit Redif Division, Bursa Redif Division

=== Order of Battle, October 29, 1912 ===
On October 29, 1912, the corps was structured as follows:

- IV Provisional Corps (Thrace, under the command of the First Eastern Army)
  - 12th Division
  - Izmit Redif Division, Çanakkale Redif Division

=== Order of Battle, July 1913 ===
- IV Corps
  - 29th Division, Ereğli Infantry Division, Kayseri Infantry Division

== World War I ==
=== Order of Battle, August 1914, November 1914 ===
In August 1914, November 1914, the corps was structured as follows:

- IV Corps (Thrace)
  - 10th Division, 11th Division, 12th Division

=== Order of Battle, April 1915 ===
In late April 1915, the corps was structured as follows:

- IV Corps (Thrace)
  - 10th Division, 12th Division

=== Order of Battle, Late Summer 1915, January 1916 ===
In late Summer 1915, January 1916, the corps was structured as follows:

- IV Corps (Gallipoli)
  - 10th Division, 11th Division, 12th Division

=== Order of Battle, August 1916 ===
In August 1916, the corps was structured as follows:

- IV Corps (Caucasus)
  - 47th Division, 48th Division

=== Order of Battle, December 1916 ===
In December 1916, the corps was structured as follows:

- IV Corps (Caucasus)
  - 11th Division, 12th Division

=== Order of Battle, August 1917 ===
In August 1917, the corps was structured as follows:

- IV Corps (Caucasus)
  - 11th Division, 12th Division, 48th Division

=== Order of Battle, January 1918 ===
In January 1918, the corps was structured as follows:

- IV Corps (Caucasus)
  - 5th Division, 8th Division, 12th Division

=== Order of Battle, June 1918 ===
In June 1918, the corps was structured as follows:

- IV Corps (Caucasus)
  - 5th Division, 11th Division, 12th Division
