= II Corps (Ottoman Empire) =

II Corps İkinci Kolordu
- Active: 1911–1918
- Country: Ottoman Empire
- Type: Corps
- Garrison/HQ: Tekfur Dağı, Adrianople
- Patron: Sultans of the Ottoman Empire
- Engagements: Gallipoli Campaign (World War I)

Commanders
- Notable commanders: Mirliva Çolak Faik Pasha; Miralay Nikolai; Miralay Cafer Tayyar Bey (1916-1917); Miralay Kâzım Karabekir Bey (April 8-December 27, 1917)

The II Corps of the Ottoman Empire (Turkish: 2 nci Kolordu or İkinci Kolordu) was one of the corps of the Ottoman Army. It was formed in the early 20th century during Ottoman military reforms.

== Formation ==
=== Order of Battle, 1911 ===
With further reorganizations of the Ottoman Army, to include the creation of corps level headquarters, by 1911 the II Corps was headquartered in Tekfur Dağı. The Corps before the First Balkan War in 1911 was structured as such:

- II Corps, Harbiye, Tekfur Dağı (Mirliva Şevket Turgut Pasha)
  - 4th Infantry Division, Tekfur Dağı (Mirliva Hıfzı Pasha)
    - 10th Infantry Regiment, Tekfur Dağı
    - 11th Infantry Regiment, Tekfur Dağı
    - 12th Infantry Regiment, Hayrabolu
    - 4th Rifle Battalion, Tekfur Dağı
    - 4th Field Artillery Regiment, Tekfur Dağı
    - 4th Division Band, Tekfur Dağı
  - 5th Infantry Division, Gallipoli
    - 16th Infantry Regiment, Gallipoli
    - 17th Infantry Regiment, Malkara
    - 18th Infantry Regiment, Uzunköprü
    - 5th Rifle Battalion, Gallipoli
    - 5th Field Artillery Regiment, Constantinople
    - 5th Division Band, Gallipoli
  - 6th Infantry Division, Smyrna (Miralay Şevki)
    - 16th Infantry Regiment, Smyrna
    - 17th Infantry Regiment, Yemen
    - 18th Infantry Regiment, Sakız
    - 6th Rifle Battalion, Sisam
    - 6th Field Artillery Regiment, Constantinople
    - 6th Division Band, Smyrna
- Units of II Corps
- 2nd Rifle Regiment, Yemen
- 2nd Field Howitzer Battalion, Şam
- 2nd Engineer Battalion, Adrianople
- 2nd Telegraph Battalion, Adrianople
- 2nd Transport Battalion, Constantinople
- 2nd Medical Battalion, Constantinople
- Dardanelles Fortified Area Command, Çanakkale
  - 3rd Heavy Artillery Regiment, Çanakkale
  - 4th Heavy Artillery Regiment, Çanakkale
  - 5th Heavy Artillery Regiment, Çanakkale
  - Independent Heavy Artillery Regiment, Çanakkale
  - Torpedo Detachment, Çanakkale
  - Mine Detachment, Çanakkale
  - Wireless Detachment, Çanakkale

== Balkan Wars ==
=== Order of Battle, October 17, 1912 ===
On October 17, 1912, the corps was structured as follows:

- II Corps (Thrace, under the command of the Eastern Army)
  - 4th Division, 3rd Division
  - Uşak Redif Division

=== Order of Battle, October 19, 1912 ===
On October 19, 1912, the corps was structured as follows:

- II Provisional Corps (Serbian Front, under the command of the Vardar Army of the Western Army)
  - Uşak Redif Division, Denizli Redif Division, Smyrna Redif Division

=== Order of Battle, October 29, 1912 ===
On October 29, 1912, the corps was structured as follows:

- II Corps (Thrace, under the command of the First Eastern Army)
  - 4th Division, 5th Division,
  - Kastamonu Redif Division

=== Order of Battle, November 17, 1912 ===
On November 17, 1912, the corps was structured as follows:

- II Corps (Thrace, under the command of the Chataldja Army)
  - 4th Division, 5th Division, 12th Division
  - South Wing Detachment
- II Provisional Reserve Corps
  - 30th Division,
  - Amasya Redif Division, Yozgat Redif Division, Samsun Redif Division

=== Order of Battle, March 25, 1913 ===
On March 25, 1913, the corps was structured as follows:

- II Corps (Thrace, under the command of the Chataldja Army)
  - 5th Division, 12th Division
  - Ankara Redif Division
- II Provisional Reserve Corps
  - Selimiye Redif Division, Aydın Redif Division, Samsun Redif Division

=== Order of Battle, July 1913 ===
- II Corps (Thrace)
  - 3rd Division, 5th Division, 12th Division

== World War I ==
=== Order of Battle, August 1914, November 1914, Late April 1915 ===
In August 1914, November 1914, Late April 1915, the corps was structured as follows:

- II Corps (Thrace)
  - 4th Division, 5th Division, 6th Division

=== Order of Battle, Late Summer 1915, January 1916 ===
In late Summer 1915, January 1916, the corps was structured as follows:

- II Corps (Gallipoli)
  - 4th Division, 5th Division, 6th Division

=== Order of Battle, August 1916 ===
In August 1916, the corps was structured as follows:

- II Corps (Caucasus)
  - 11th Division, 12th Division

=== Order of Battle, December 1916 ===
In December 1916, the corps was structured as follows:

- II Corps (Caucasus)
  - 1st Division, 47th Division

=== Order of Battle, August 1917 ===
In August 1917, the corps was structured as follows:

- II Corps (Caucasus)
  - 1st Division, 42nd Division

=== Order of Battle, September 1918 ===
In September 1918, the corps was structured as follows:

- II Corps (Palestine)
  - 62nd Division, Provisional Infantry Division x 3
