= XIX Corps (Ottoman Empire) =

XIX Corps On Dokuzuncu Kolordu
- Active: 1916–
- Country: Ottoman Empire
- Type: Corps
- Patron: Sultans of the Ottoman Empire

Commanders
- Notable commanders: Miralay Selâhattin Âdil Bey (October 20-December 17, 1916)

The XIX Corps of the Ottoman Empire (Turkish: 19 ncu Kolordu or On Dokuzuncu Kolordu) was one of the corps of the Ottoman Army. It was formed during World War I.

== Formations ==
=== Order of Battle, August 1917, January 1918 ===
In August 1917, January 1918, the corps was structured as follows:

- XIX Corps (Gallipoli)
  - 59th Division

=== Order of Battle, June, September 1918 ===
In June, September 1918, the corps was structured as follows:

- XIX Corps (Gallipoli)
  - None
