= Rüştü Sakarya =

Turkish soldier

Rüştü Sakarya 1311-b-P. 70
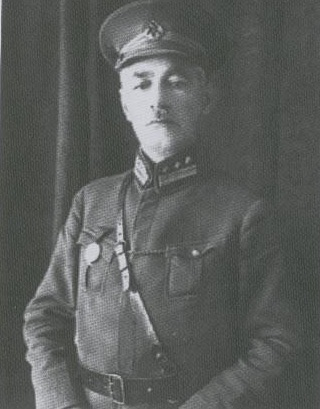
- Born: 1877; Constantinople (Istanbul), Ottoman Empire
- Died: December 2, 1951 (aged 73–74); Istanbul, Turkey
- Burial place: State Cemetery
- Military career
- Allegiance: Ottoman Empire; Turkey
- Service years: Ottoman Empire: 1895–1919; Turkey: July 6, 1921 – March 25, 1934
- Rank: Major general
- Commands: 16th Division, 61st Division, Konya Area Command, Military Service Department of the IV Corps, president to the Military Court for senior and junior officers, member of the Military Supreme Court
- Conflicts: Balkan Wars; First World War; Turkish War of Independence

Rüştü Sakarya (1877 in Constantinople (Istanbul) – December 2, 1951) was an officer of the Ottoman Army and a general of the Turkish Army. He fought in the Gallipoli campaign of World War I. He earned his surname "Sakarya" due to his bravery during the Battle of the Sakarya in the Turkish War of Independence.

== Medals and decorations ==
- Order of Osminieh 3rd class
- Order of Osmanieh with Sword
- Medal of the Battle of Greece (Yunan Muharebe Madalyası)
- Gallipoli Star (Ottoman Empire)
- Silver Medal of Liyaqat
- Silver Medal of Imtiyaz
- Gold Medal of Liyaqat
- Iron Cross 1st and 2nd class
- Austria-Hungary Military Merit Medal (Austria-Hungary) 3rd Class
- Medal of Independence with Red Ribbon

== See also ==
- List of high-ranking commanders of the Turkish War of Independence
