= 7th Infantry Division (Ottoman Empire) =

The 7th Infantry Division was a formation of the Ottoman Turkish Army, during the Balkan Wars, and the First World War.

== Formation ==
19th Infantry Regiment
20th Infantry Regiment
21st Infantry Regiment
7th Artillery Regiment
