= Eastern Army (Ottoman Empire) =

- Active: Eastern Army: 1912-October 28, 1912; First Eastern Army: October 29-November 7, 1912
- Country: Ottoman Empire
- Type: Field Army
- Garrison/HQ: Salonika
- Patron: Sultans of the Ottoman Empire

Commanders
- Notable commanders: Ferik Kölemen Abdullah Pasha; Ferik Ahmed Abuk Pasha

The Eastern Army of the Ottoman Empire (Turkish: Şark Ordusu) was one of the field armies of the Ottoman Army. It was formed during the mobilization phase of the First Balkan War. It confronted Bulgarian forces. On October 29, 1912, it was reorganized and renamed as the First Eastern Army (Birinci Şark Ordusu).

== Eastern Army ==
=== Order of Battle, October 17, 1912 ===
On October 17, 1912, the army was structured as follows:

- Eastern Army HQ (Kavaklı, commander: Ferik Kölemen Abdullah Pasha, chief of staff: Miralay Djevat Bey)
  - I Corps
  - II Corps
  - III Corps (commanded by Mirliva Mahmud Muhtar Pasha)
  - IV Provisional Corps (commanded by Ferik Ahmed Abuk Pasha)
  - VII Provisional Corps
  - Adrianople Fortified Area Command (commanded by Ferik Mehmed Shukur Pasha)
  - Kırcaali Detachment

== First Eastern Army ==
On October 29, 1912, the army was structured as follows:

- First Eastern Army HQ: Ferik Ahmed Abuk Pasha
  - I Corps
  - II Corps
  - IV Provisional Corps
  - Independent Cavalry Division
