= 5th Infantry Division (Ottoman Empire) =

The 5th Infantry Division was a formation of the Ottoman Turkish Army, during the Balkan Wars, and the First World War.

== Formation ==
13th Infantry Regiment
14th Infantry Regiment
