= 9th Infantry Division (Ottoman Empire) =

Combat formation of the Ottoman Army

The 9th Infantry Division was a formation of the Ottoman Turkish Army, during the Balkan Wars, and the First World War.

== Gallipoli Campaign ==
Two thirds of the 19th Division were Syrians under Colonel Mustafa Kemal (Kemal Atatürk). The struggle formed the basis for the Turkish War of Independence and the declaration of the Republic of Turkey eight years later. "Two thirds of the troops who made up his (colonel Mustafa Kemal) 19th Division that faced the first wave of the Allied invasion were Syrian Arabs, comprising the 72nd and 77th regiments of the Ottoman army", according to Bill Sellars, Australian writer and historian.

The regiments of the division included the 25th Infantry Regiment; 26th Infantry Regiment and 27th Infantry Regiment.

The division's modern descendant appears to be the 9th Commando Brigade, which had long service as the 9th Infantry Division at Sarıkamış in the Third Army (Turkey) area after 1945.
