= Middle Eastern theatre of World War I =

Scene of action between 29 October 1914 and 30 October 1918

- Part of World War I
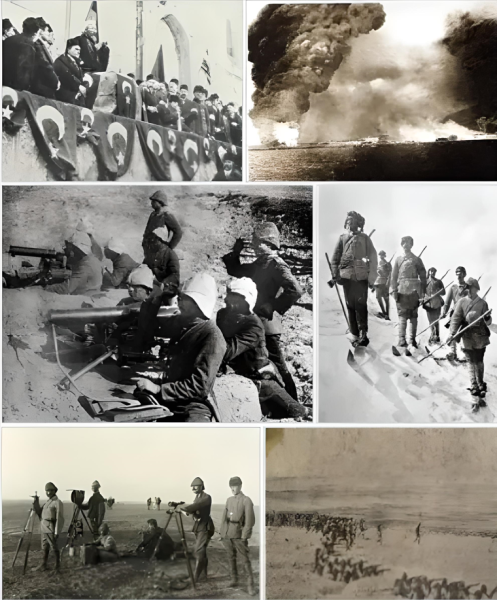
- From left to right: The Ottoman Shaykh al-Islām who declared Jihad against the Entente Powers; Burning oil tanks in the port of Novorossiysk after the Ottoman Empire's strike on Russian ports; 5th Army during the Gallipoli Campaign; 3rd Army on the Caucasus campaign; The heliograph team of the Ottoman army in the Sinai and Palestine campaign; Ottoman soldiers during the Siege of Kut in Baghdad vilayet.
Date	29 October 1914 – 30 October 1918
Location	Middle East (Caucasus, Sinai Peninsula, Palestine, Syria, Israel, Jordan, Persia, Gallipoli, Arabian Peninsula, Persian Gulf, Iraq)
Result	Allied victory
Territorial changes	Partitioning of the Ottoman Empire

Belligerents
Allied Powers: British Empire: United Kingdom; Egypt; India; Australia; New Zealand; South Africa; Newfoundland; Kuwait; Russia (until 1917): Armenian Corps; France: Algeria; Tunisia; West Africa; Armenian Legion; Italy (from 1917); Hejaz (from 1916); Armenia (from 1918)	Central Powers: Ottoman Empire; Germany; Austria-Hungary
Supported by: Assyrian volunteers; Armenian fedayi	Supported by: Jabal Shammar; (Azerbaijan Democratic Republic) Azerbaijan (from 1918); (Democratic Republic of Georgia) Georgia (from 1918)

Commanders and leaders
(United Kingdom of Great Britain and Ireland) Julian Byng (United Kingdom of Great Britain and Ireland) Archibald Murray (United Kingdom of Great Britain and Ireland) Edmund Allenby (United Kingdom of Great Britain and Ireland) Ian Hamilton (United Kingdom of Great Britain and Ireland) John Nixon (United Kingdom of Great Britain and Ireland) Percy Lake (United Kingdom of Great Britain and Ireland) Stanley Maude # (United Kingdom of Great Britain and Ireland) Lionel Dunsterville (United Kingdom of Great Britain and Ireland) T. E. Lawrence (Russian Empire) I. Vorontsov-Dashkov (Russian Empire) Grand Duke Nikolai (Russian Empire) Nikolai Yudenich (Russian Empire) Nikolai Baratov (French Third Republic) Henri Gouraud (WIA) (French Third Republic) Maurice Bailloud; Agha Petros; Malik Khoshaba; Shimun XIX Benyamin X (First Republic of Armenia) Hovhannes Hakhverdyan (First Republic of Armenia) Tovmas Nazarbekian (First Republic of Armenia) Andranik Ozanian (Kingdom of Hejaz) Hussein bin Ali (Kingdom of Hejaz) Faisal bin Hussein	(Ottoman Empire) Enver Pasha (Ottoman Empire) Djemal Pasha (Ottoman Empire) Cevat Pasha (Ottoman Empire) Vehip Pasha (Ottoman Empire) Nuri Pasha (Ottoman Empire) Ahmed Izzet Pasha (Ottoman Empire) Mustafa Kemal Pasha (WIA) (Ottoman Empire) Fevzi Pasha (Ottoman Empire) Abdul Kerim Pasha (Ottoman Empire) Halil Pasha (Ottoman Empire) Nureddin Pasha (Ottoman Empire) Mehmet Esat Pasha (Ottoman Empire) Fakhri Pasha (German Empire) F. B. von Schellendorf (German Empire) Otto Liman von Sanders (German Empire) Colmar von der Goltz # (German Empire) Erich von Falkenhayn (German Empire) F. K. von Kressenstein (Emirate of Jabal Shammar) Saud bin Abdulaziz (Azerbaijan Democratic Republic) Fatali Khan Khoyski (Democratic Republic of Georgia) Noe Zhordania

Strength
(British Empire) 2,550,000 (Russian Empire) 1,000,000 (French Third Republic) Several 100,000's (First Republic of Armenia) Several 100,000's (Arab Revolt) 100,000+ 20,000+ Total: 4,000,000+	(Ottoman Empire) 3,059,205; 800,000 (peak); 323,000 (during Armistice) (German Empire) 6,500 (1916); 20,000 (1918) (Azerbaijan Democratic Republic) ~6,000 (1918) (Emirate of Jabal Shammar) 9,000 (1918) Total: 3,100,000

Casualties and losses
Total: c. 900,000 casualties: (British Empire) 680,000+; (Russian Empire) 140,000+ (Note: (up to September 1916)); (French Third Republic) 47,000; (Kingdom of Hejaz) 20,000; Military dead: 150,000–200,000; Civilian dead: 2,275,000	Total: 1,788,200 casualties: (Ottoman Empire) 1,785,800; (German Empire) (Austria-Hungary) 3,200 (Note: POWs held by the end of the war are given as 5,703 officers and 96,133 other ranks, broken down by ethnicity. However that total also includes "over 3,000" Austro-German men and 206 Austro-German officers, which are listed below separately. Ottoman POWs alone would therefore be 5,497 officers and about 93,000 other ranks. Of these 8,000 were captured by the Arab insurgents under King Hussein.[Statistics of the Military Effort of the British Empire During the Great War 1914–1920, The War Office, p. 633.]); Military dead: 325,000–771,000; Civilian dead: 1,200,000–2,500,000
- 2,000,000 Persian civilians dead from famine exacerbated by Russian, British, and Ottoman occupation Total dead: 7,000,000+

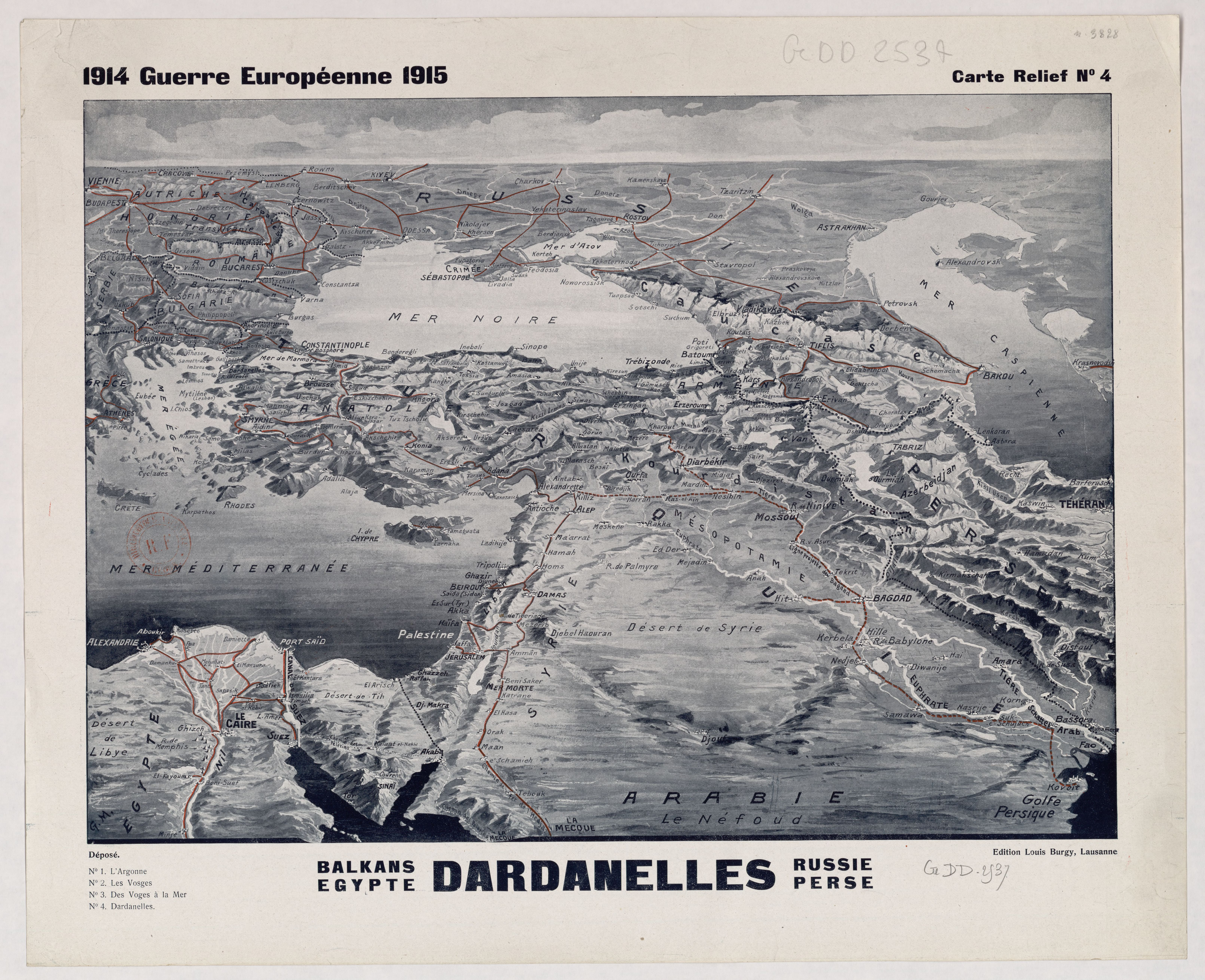
Pictorial map of the Middle East in 1915

The Middle Eastern theatre of World War I saw action between 30 October 1914 and 30 October 1918. The combatants were, on one side, the Ottoman Empire (with the help of a great number of Kurdish tribes and Circassians, and the relative majority of Arabs), with some assistance from the other Central Powers; and on the other side, the British (with the help of a small number of Jews, Greeks, Armenians, some Kurdish tribes and Arab states, along with Hindu, Sikh and Muslim colonial troops from India) as well as troops from the British Dominions of Australia, Canada, and New Zealand, the Russians (with the help of Armenians, Assyrians, and occasionally some Kurdish tribes), and the French (with its North African and West African Muslim, Christian and other colonial troops) from among the Allied Powers. There were four main campaigns: the Sinai and Palestine, Mesopotamian, Caucasus, and Gallipoli campaigns. There were four more minor campaigns in Persia, South Arabia, the Arabian interior, and Libya.

Both sides used local asymmetrical forces in the region. On the Allied side were Arabs who participated in the Arab Revolt and the Armenian militia who participated in the Armenian resistance supported by Russia during the War; along with Armenian volunteer units, the Armenian militia formed the Armenian Corps of the First Republic of Armenia in 1918. In addition, the Assyrians joined the Allies and saw action in Southeastern Turkey, northern Ottoman Iraq, northwestern Iran and northeastern Syria following the Assyrian genocide, instigating the Assyrian war of independence. The theatre covered the largest territory of all theatres in the war.

Russian participation in the theatre ended as a result of the Armistice of Erzincan (5 December 1917), after which the revolutionary Russian government withdrew from the war under the terms of the Treaty of Brest-Litovsk (3 March 1918). The Armenians attended the Trebizond Peace Conference (14 March 1918) which resulted in the Treaty of Batum on 4 June 1918. The Ottomans accepted the Armistice of Mudros with the Allies on 30 October 1918, and signed the Treaty of Sèvres on 10 August 1920 and later the Treaty of Lausanne on 24 July 1923.

== Objectives ==
=== Ottomans and Central Powers ===
The Ottoman Empire joined the Central Powers through the secret German–Ottoman alliance, which was signed on 2 August 1914. The main objective of the Ottoman Empire in the Caucasus was the recovery of its territories that had been lost during the Russo-Turkish War (1877–1878), in particular Artvin, Ardahan, Kars, and the port of Batum. Success in this region would force the Russians to divert troops from the Polish and Galician fronts.

German advisors with the Ottoman armies supported the campaign for this reason. From an economic perspective, the Ottoman, or rather German, strategic goal was to cut off Russian access to the hydrocarbon resources around the Caspian Sea.

Germany established an Intelligence Bureau for the East on the eve of World War I. The bureau was involved in intelligence-gathering and subversive missions to Persia and Egypt, and to Afghanistan, to dismantle the Anglo-Russian Entente. Ottoman War Minister Enver Pasha claimed that if the Russians could be beaten in the key cities of Persia, it could open the way to Azerbaijan, as well as the rest of the Middle East and the Caucasus.

If these nations were to be removed from Western influence, Enver envisioned a cooperation between these newly established Turkic states. Enver's project conflicted with European interests which played out as struggles between several key imperial powers. The Ottomans also threatened Britain's communications with India and the East via the Suez Canal. The Germans hoped to seize the Canal for the Central Powers, or at least to deny the Allies use of the vital shipping route.

=== Allies ===
==== Britain ====
The British feared that the Ottomans might attack and capture the Middle East (and later Caspian) oil fields. The British Royal Navy depended upon oil from the petroleum deposits in southern Persia, to which the British-controlled Anglo-Persian Oil Company had exclusive access.

Oxford historian (and Conservative MP) J.A.R. Marriott summarizes the British debates on strategy for the Near East and Balkan theatre:

The War in that theatre presents many problems and suggests many questions. Whether by a timely display of force the Turk could have been kept true to his ancient connexion with Great Britain and France; whether by more sagacious diplomacy the hostility of Bulgaria could have been averted, and the co-operation of Greece secured; whether by the military intervention of the Entente Powers the cruel blow could have been warded off from Serbia and Montenegro; whether the Dardanelles expedition was faulty only in execution or unsound in conception; whether Romania came into tardily, or moved too soon, and in the wrong direction.

==== Russia ====
The Russians viewed the Caucasus Front as secondary to the Eastern Front. They feared a campaign into the Caucasus aimed at retaking Kars which had been taken from the Ottoman Empire during the Russo-Turkish War (1877–1878), and the port of Batum.

In March 1915, when the Russian foreign minister Sergey Sazonov met with British ambassador George Buchanan and French ambassador Maurice Paléologue, he stated that a lasting postwar settlement demanded full Russian possession of the capital city of the Ottoman Empire, Constantinople, the straits of the Bosphorus and Dardanelles, the Sea of Marmara, southern Thrace up to the Enos-Midia line as well as parts of the Black Sea coast of Anatolia between the Bosphorus, the Sakarya River and an undetermined point near the Bay of Izmit. The Russian Imperial government planned to replace the Muslim population of Northern Anatolia and Istanbul with more reliable Cossack settlers.

=== Armenians ===
The Armenian national liberation movement sought to establish an Armenian state within the Armenian Highlands. The Armenian Revolutionary Federation achieved this goal later in the war, with the establishment of the internationally recognized First Republic of Armenia in May 1918. As early as 1915, the Administration for Western Armenia and later Republic of Mountainous Armenia were Armenian-controlled entities, while the Centrocaspian Dictatorship was established with Armenian participation. None of these entities were long lasting.

=== Arabs ===
The principal actor was King Hussein as head of the Kingdom of Hejaz. He led what is now called the Arab Revolt, the principal objectives of which were self-rule and an end to Ottoman control of the region.

=== Assyrians ===
In reaction to the Assyrian Genocide and lured by British and Russian promises of an independent nation, the Assyrians led by Agha Petros of the Bit-Bazi, Malik Khoshaba of the Bit-Tiyari tribe and other tribal chiefs of Hakkari under the national leader Mar Shimun XXI Benyamin joined the Entente Powers and fought alongside the Allies against Ottoman forces, the Assyrians were known as the Assyrian volunteers or Our Smallest Ally

During the peace conferences in Paris in 1919, the Assyrian delegation asked for a state in Diyarbekir Vilayet and northern Mesopotamia in Iraq, others requested a British protectorate in Upper Mesopotamia, northern Mosul, and Urmia. This was however rejected by Great Britain and the U.S. delegates. In 1924 the Assyrians tried to retake their ancestral lands in Hakkari resulting in an Assyrian rebellion that failed, after Turkey formally occupied Hakkari they expelled the last Christian inhabitants who still remained in the region

=== Kurds ===
In the early twentieth century, Kurds, much like Arabs, were a diverse population, dispersed across a wide area and far from homogeneous in social status or geo-political outlook. Though many were committed proponents of Kurdish nationalism, this view was far from ubiquitous. In 1914, many Kurds belonged to the Ottoman elite and Kurds often held high ranking and prominent offices within the Ottoman state.

Kurdish Nationalists hoped that the Allies of World War I would aid them in creating an independent Kurdish nation if they were to fight against the Ottomans, and undertook several uprisings throughout the war. Most of these, except for the uprisings of August 1917, were not supported by any of the allied powers.

However, many Kurds remained loyal to and fought on behalf of the Ottoman Empire. The most notorious example being the Hamidiye, a mostly Kurdish elite cavalry division of the Ottoman army that fought in both the Caucasus and Persian campaigns and played a significant role in the Armenian genocide. Regions with high Armenian revolutionary actions were targets for the Hamidiye, who referred to an "Armenian Conspiracy" as justification for killing the Armenians. According to some estimates, about ten to twenty thousand Armenians were slaughtered by the Hamidiye units.

In other instances local Kurds joined with Turkish forces not out of loyalty but to share in the spoils taken from Armenian civilians. According to historian Raymond Kévorkian, while many nomadic Kurdish tribes actively participated in the genocide, settled Kurds rarely did so.

Many Kurds also opposed the genocide and undertook personal efforts to rescue Armenian civilians.

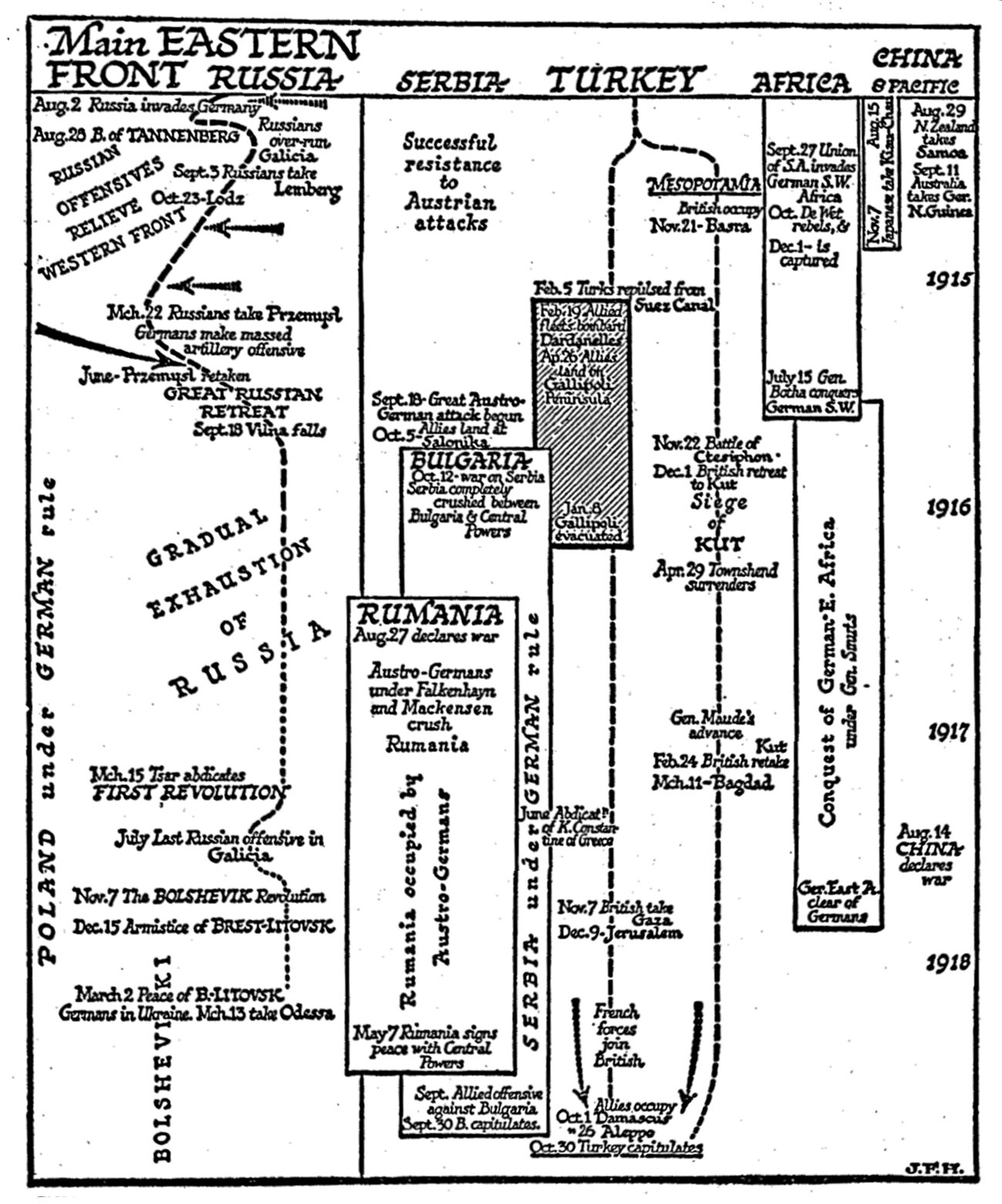
A timeline of events on the Eastern and Middle-Eastern theatres of World War I

== Operational area ==
The Caucasus Campaign comprised armed conflicts between the Ottoman Empire and the allies, the forces of the latter including Azerbaijan, Armenia, the Central Caspian Dictatorship, and the UK as part of the Middle Eastern theatre, or alternatively named, as part of the Caucasus Campaign during World War I. The Caucasus Campaign extended from the Caucasus to eastern Asia Minor, reaching as far as Trabzon, Bitlis, Mush and Van. The warfare on land was accompanied by actions undertaken by the Russian Navy in the Black Sea region of the Ottoman Empire.

On 23 February 1917, the Russian advance was halted following the Russian Revolution, and later the disintegrated Russian Caucasus Army was replaced by the forces of the newly established Armenian state, which comprised the previous Armenian volunteer units and the Armenian irregular units. During 1918 the region also saw the establishment of the Central Caspian Dictatorship, the Republic of Mountainous Armenia, and an Allied force named Dunsterforce which was composed of elite troops drawn from the Mesopotamian and Western Fronts.

The Ottoman Empire and German Empire fought each other at Batumi after the arrival of the German Caucasus Expedition whose prime aim was to secure oil supplies. On 3 March 1918, the conflict between the Ottoman Empire and Russia ended with the Treaty of Brest-Litovsk, and on 4 June 1918, the Ottoman Empire signed the Treaty of Batum with Armenia. However, the armed conflicts extended as the Ottoman Empire continued to engage with the Central Caspian Dictatorship, Republic of Mountainous Armenia, and British Empire forces from Dunsterforce until the Armistice of Mudros was signed on 30 October 1918.

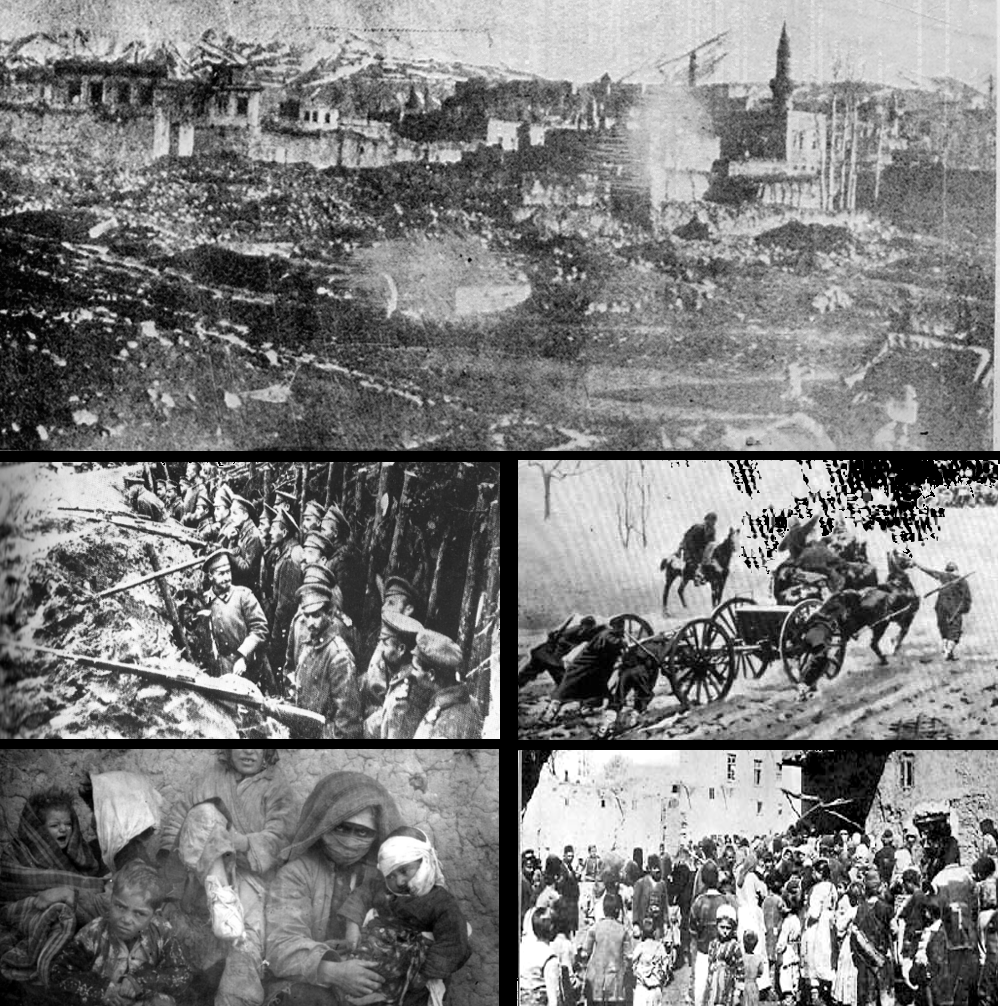
Top: Destruction in the city of Erzurum; Left Upper: Russian forces; Left Lower: Wounded Muslim refugees; Right Upper: Ottoman forces; Right Lower: Armenian refugees

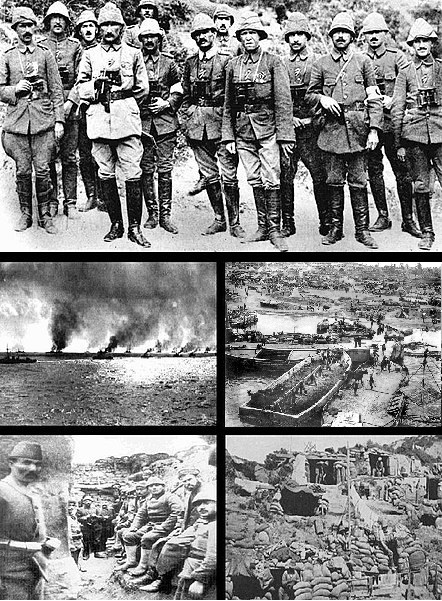
The Gallipoli Campaign, February–April 1915

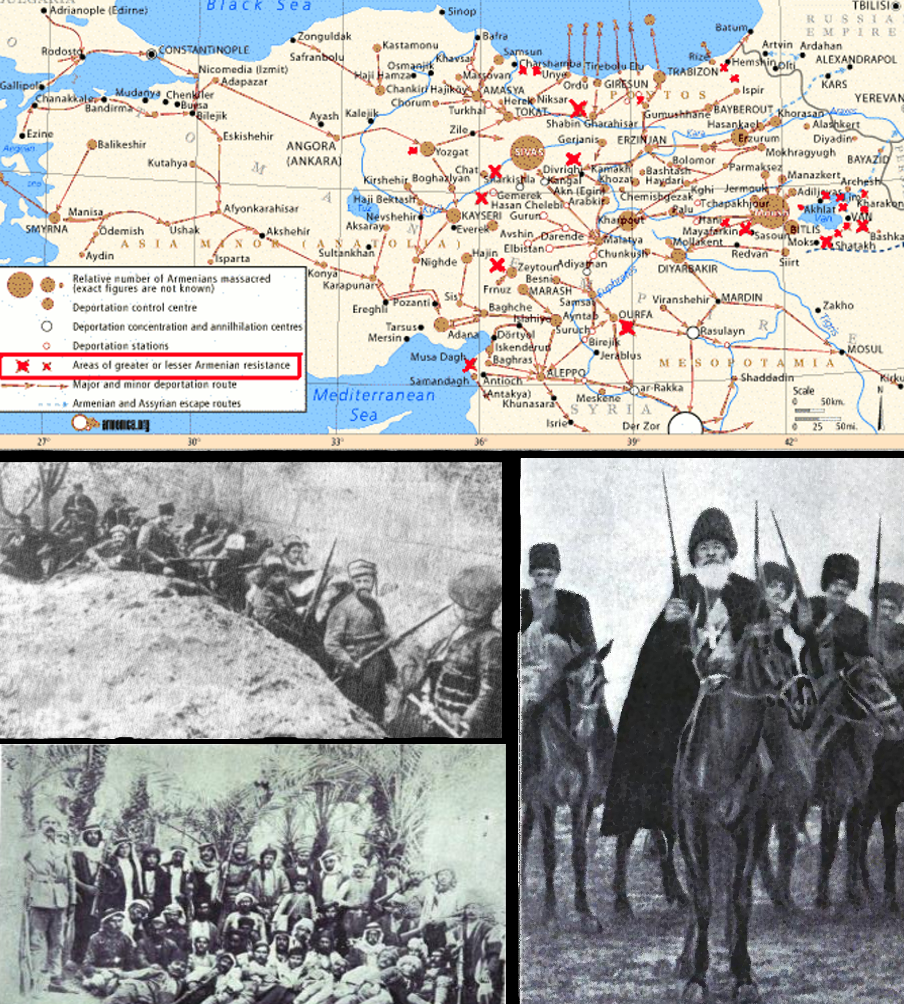
"Top:" The size of the stars show where the active conflicts occurred in 1915 "Left Upper:" Armenians defending the walls of Van in the spring of 1915 "Left Lower:" Armenian Resistance in Urfa "Right:" A seventy-year-old Armenian priest leading Armenians to battle field.

== Ottomans on the Eastern European Front ==
Over 90,000 Ottoman troops were sent to the Eastern European Front in 1916, to participate in operations in Romania in the Balkans Campaign. The Central Powers asked for these units to support their operations against the Russian army. Later, it was concluded that the deployment was a mistake, as these forces would have been better placed remaining to protect Ottoman territory against the massive Erzerum Offensive that the Russian army had begun.

The relocation of troops to the Eastern European Front was initiated by Enver. It was originally rejected by the German Chief of Staff, Erich von Falkenhayn, but his successor, Paul von Hindenburg, agreed to it, albeit with reservations. The decision was reached after the Brusilov Offensive, as the Central Powers were running short of men on the Eastern Front.

In the deployment, Enver sent the XV Army Corps to Galicia, the VI Army Corps to Romania, and the XX Army Corps and 177th Infantry Regiment to Macedonia in early 1916. The VI Corps took part in the collapse of the Romanian army in the Romanian Campaign, and were particularly valued for their ability to continue a high rate of advance in harsh winter conditions. The XV Corps was known to fight very well against the Russians in Galicia, often inflicting on the Russians several times the casualties they took.

== Forces ==
=== Central Powers (Ottoman Empire) ===
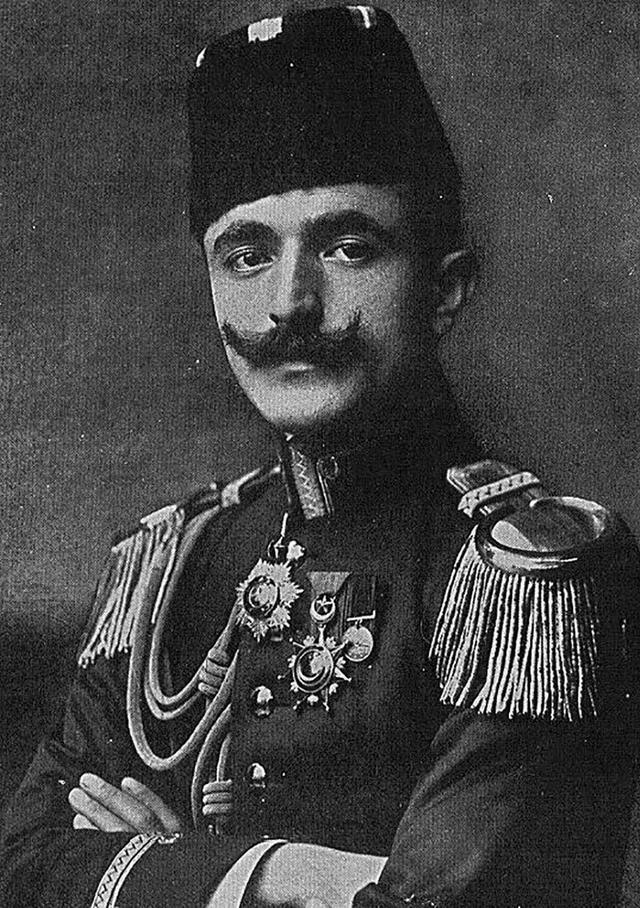
War Minister Ismail Enver of the Ottoman Empire

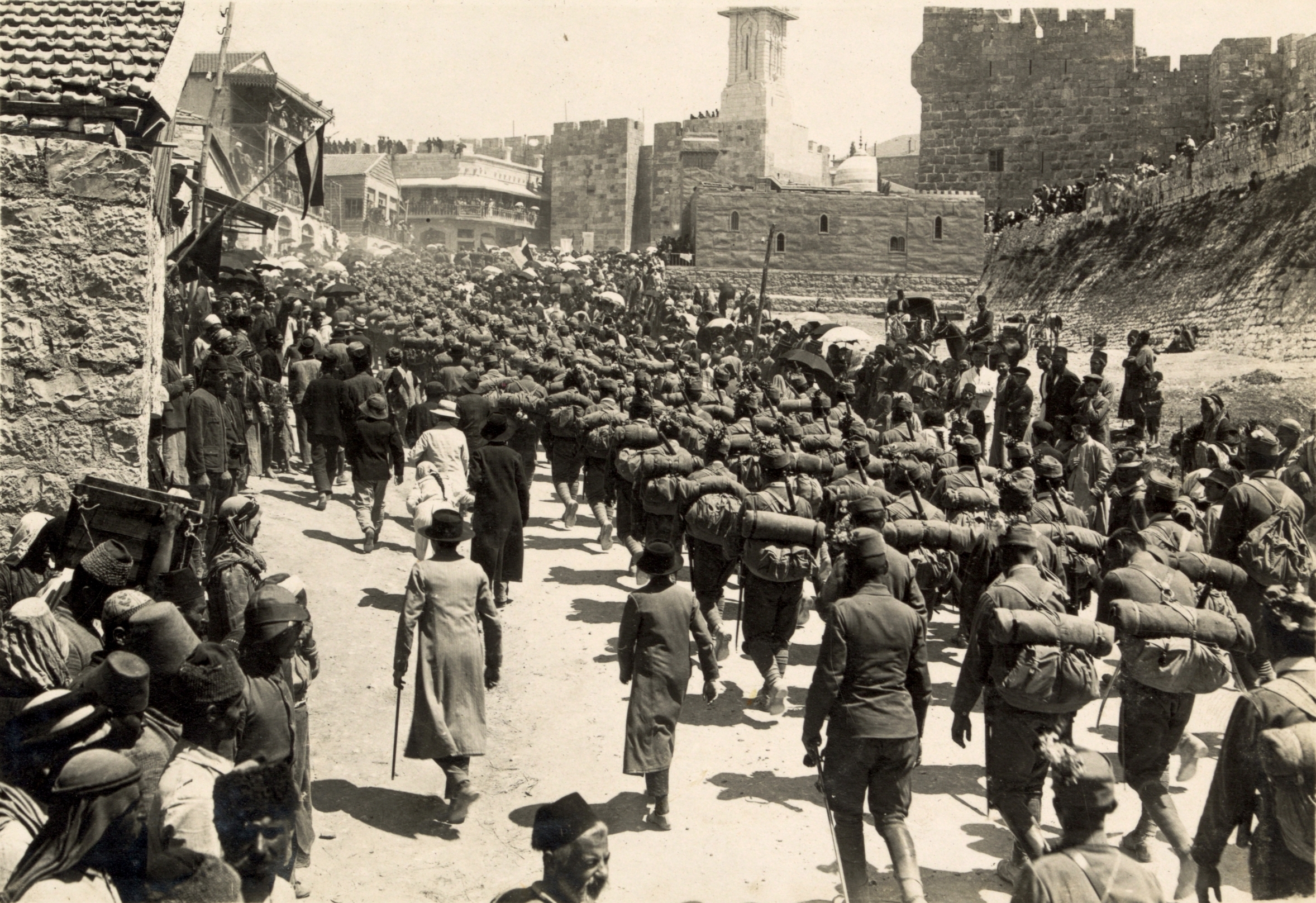
Austrian troops marching up Mount Zion in Jerusalem, 1916

After the Young Turk Revolution and the establishment of the Second Constitutional Era (Turkish: İkinci Meşrûtiyet Devri) on 3 July 1908, a major military reform started. Army headquarters were modernised. The Ottoman Empire was engaged in the Turco-Italian War and Balkan Wars, which forced more restructuring of the army, only a few years before the First World War.

From the outset, the Ottoman Army faced a host of problems in assembling itself. First of all, the size of the Ottoman Army was severely limited by division within the empire: non-Muslims were exempt from the military draft, and reliable ethnic Turks made up only 12 million of the empire's already relatively small population of 22 million, with the other 10 million being minorities of varying loyalty and military use. The empire was also very poor compared to the other powers in GDP, infrastructure, and industrial capacity. As a point of comparison the empire had only 5,759 km of railway, while France had 51,000 km of railway for a fifth of the land area. Ottoman coal production was negligible (826,000 tons in 1914 compared to 40,000,000 tons for France and 292,000,000 tons for Britain), while steel production was borderline non-existent. There was only one cannon and small arms foundry in the empire, a single shell and bullet factory, and a single gunpowder factory, all of which were located in the Constantinople suburbs. The Ottoman economy was almost entirely agricultural, relying on products such as wool, cotton, and hides.

During this period, the Empire divided its forces into armies. Each army headquarters consisted of a Chief of Staff, an operations section, intelligence section, logistics section and a personnel section. As a long established tradition in the Ottoman military, supply, medical and veterinary services were included in these armies. Before the war, the Turkish General Staff estimated that 1,000,000 men could be mobilized at one time and that 500,000 of these were available as mobile field armies, with the rest serving in garrisons, coastal defenses, and in servicing lines of communication and transportation. Approximately 900 field guns were available for the mobile army, which was 280 below war establishment, though supplies of howitzers were generally sufficient. There were an additional 900 pieces of fixed or semifixed set-up in coastal and fortress garrisons across Adrianople, Erzurum, the Bosphorous, the Dardanelles, and the Catalca. Ammunition was low; there were only about 588 shells available per gun. Additionally, the army estimated it needed several thousand more machine guns to fill its establishment; rifles were generally efficient at 1.5 million in stock, the army still needed another 200,000.

In 1914, before the Empire entered the war, the four armies divided their forces into corps and divisions such that each division had three infantry regiments and an artillery regiment. The main units were: First Army with fifteen divisions; Second Army with 4 divisions plus an independent infantry division with three infantry regiments and an artillery brigade; Third Army with nine divisions, four independent infantry regiments and four independent cavalry regiments (tribal units); and the Fourth Army with four divisions.

In August 1914, of 36 infantry divisions organised, fourteen were established from scratch and were essentially new divisions. In a very short time, eight of these newly recruited divisions went through major redeployment. During the war, more armies were established; 5th Army and 6th Army in 1915, 7th Army and 8th Army in 1917, and Kuva-i İnzibatiye and the Army of Islam, which had only a single corps, in 1918.

By 1918, the original armies had been so badly reduced that the Empire was forced to establish new unit definitions which incorporated these armies. These were the Eastern Army Group and Yildirim Army Group. However, although the number of armies was increasing over the four years of the war, the Empire's resources of manpower and supplies were declining, so that the Army Groups in 1918 were smaller than the armies of 1914. The Ottoman Army was still partially effective until the end of the war.

Most military equipment was manufactured in Germany or Austria, and maintained by German and Austrian engineers. Germany also supplied most of the military advisers; a force of specialist troops (the Asia Korps) was dispatched in 1917, and increased to a fighting force of two regiments in 1918. The German Caucasus Expedition was established in the formerly Russian Transcaucasia around early 1918 during the Caucasus Campaign. Its prime aim was to secure oil supplies for Germany and stabilise a nascent pro-German Democratic Republic of Georgia. The new republic brought the Ottoman Empire and Germany into conflict, with exchanges of official condemnations between them in the final months of the war.

==== Recruitment ====
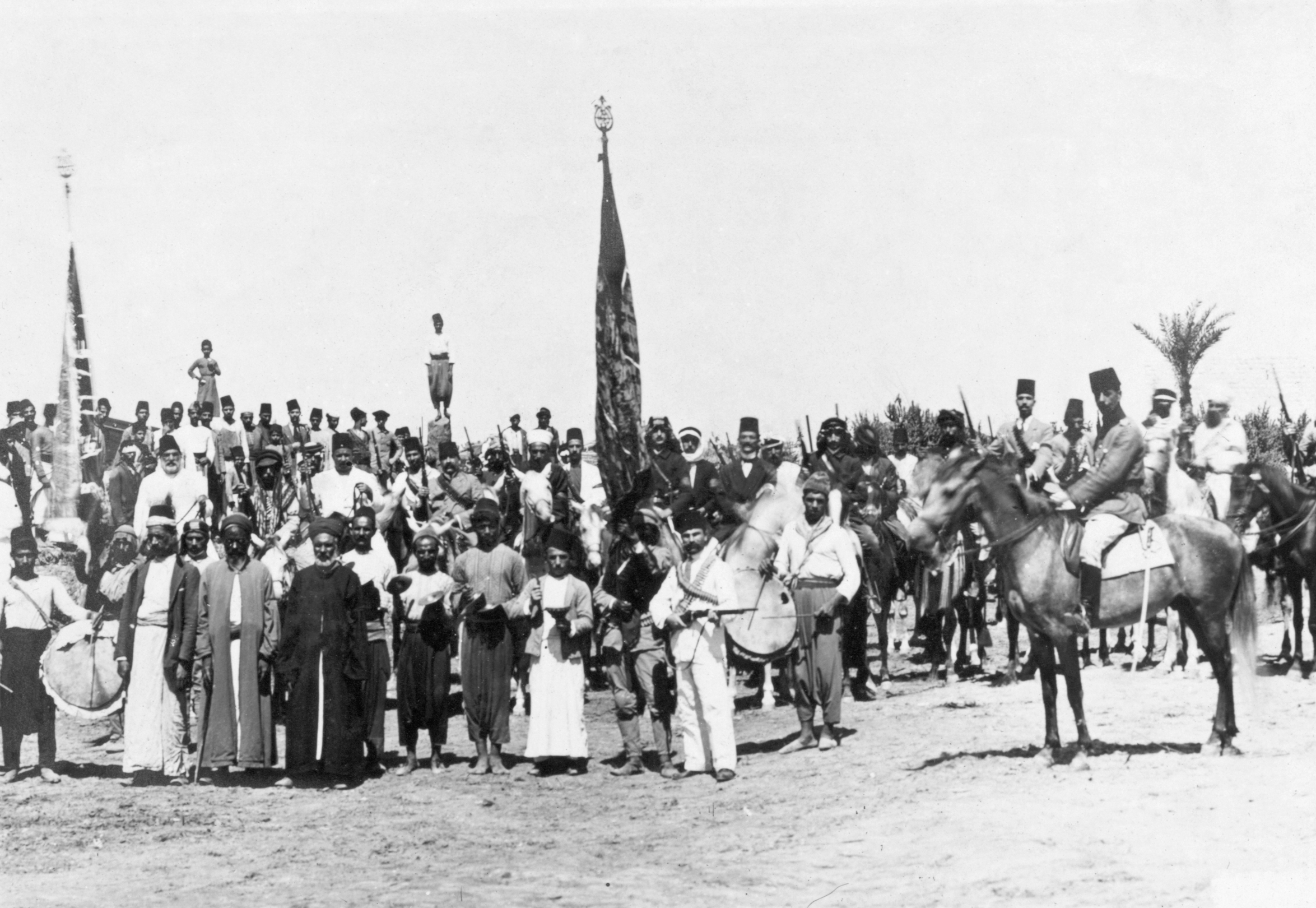
Ottoman military recruitment near Tiberias

The Ottoman Empire established a new recruitment law on 12 May 1914. This lowered the conscription age from 20 to 18, and abolished the "redif" or reserve system. Active duty lengths were set at two years for the infantry, three years for other branches of the Army and five years for the Navy. These measures remained largely theoretical during the war.

Traditional Ottoman forces depended on volunteers from the Muslim population of the empire. Additionally, several groups and individuals in the Ottoman society volunteered for active duty during the World War, the major examples being the "Mevlevi" and the "Kadiri".

There were also units formed by Caucasian and Rumelian Turks, who took part in the battles in Mesopotamia and Palestine. Among Ottoman forces, volunteers were not only from Turkic groups; there were also smaller numbers of Arab and Bedouin volunteers who fought in the campaign against the British to capture the Suez Canal, and in Mesopotamia. Volunteers were considered unreliable by the organised army, due to a lack of training and a perception of mainly mercenary interests from the Arab and Bedouin volunteers. Heavy fighting also placed pressure on the Ottoman volunteer system.

=== Entente nations ===
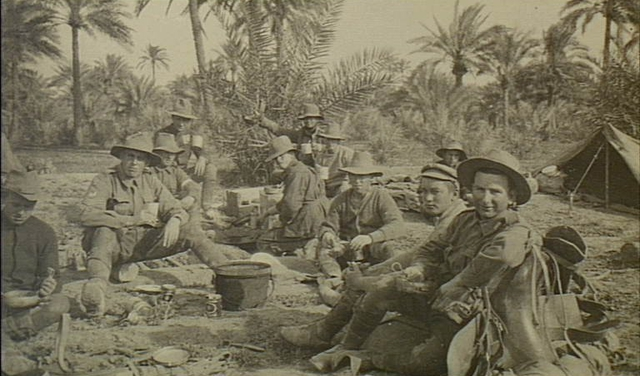
Australian soldiers in Baghdad, 1917

Before the war, Russia had the Russian Caucasus Army, but almost half of this was redeployed to the Prussian front after the defeats at the battles of Tannenberg and the Masurian Lakes, leaving behind just 60,000 troops in this theatre. In the summer of 1914, Armenian volunteer units were established under the Russian Armed forces. Nearly 20,000 Armenian volunteers expressed their readiness to take up arms against the Ottoman Empire as early as 1914. These volunteer units increased in size during the war, to the extent that Boghos Nubar, in a public letter to the Paris Peace Conference in 1919, stated that they numbered 150,000.

The Assyrian people of south east Anatolia, northern Mesopotamia and north western Persia also threw in their lot with the Russians and British, under the leadership of Agha Petros and Malik Khoshaba.

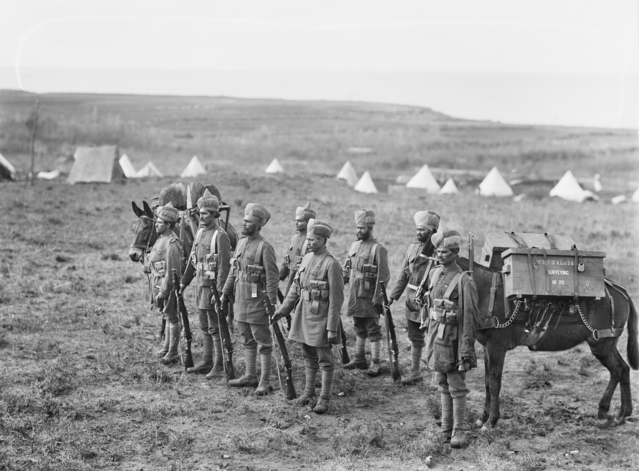
Indian Sappers and Miners in Tripoli, Lebanon.

In 1914, there were some British Indian Army units located in the southern parts of Persia. These units had extensive experience in dealing with dissident tribal forces. The British later established the Mediterranean Expeditionary Force, British Dardanelles Army, Egyptian Expeditionary Force, and in 1917 they established Dunsterforce under Lionel Dunsterville, consisting of less than 1,000 Australian, British, Canadian and New Zealand troops accompanied by armoured cars, to oppose Ottoman and German forces in the Caucasus.

In 1916, an Arab Revolt began in the Hejaz. About 5,000 regular soldiers (mostly former prisoners of war of Arab origin) served with the forces of the revolt. There were also many irregular tribesmen under the direction of the Emir Feisal and British advisers. Of the advisers, T. E. Lawrence is the best known.

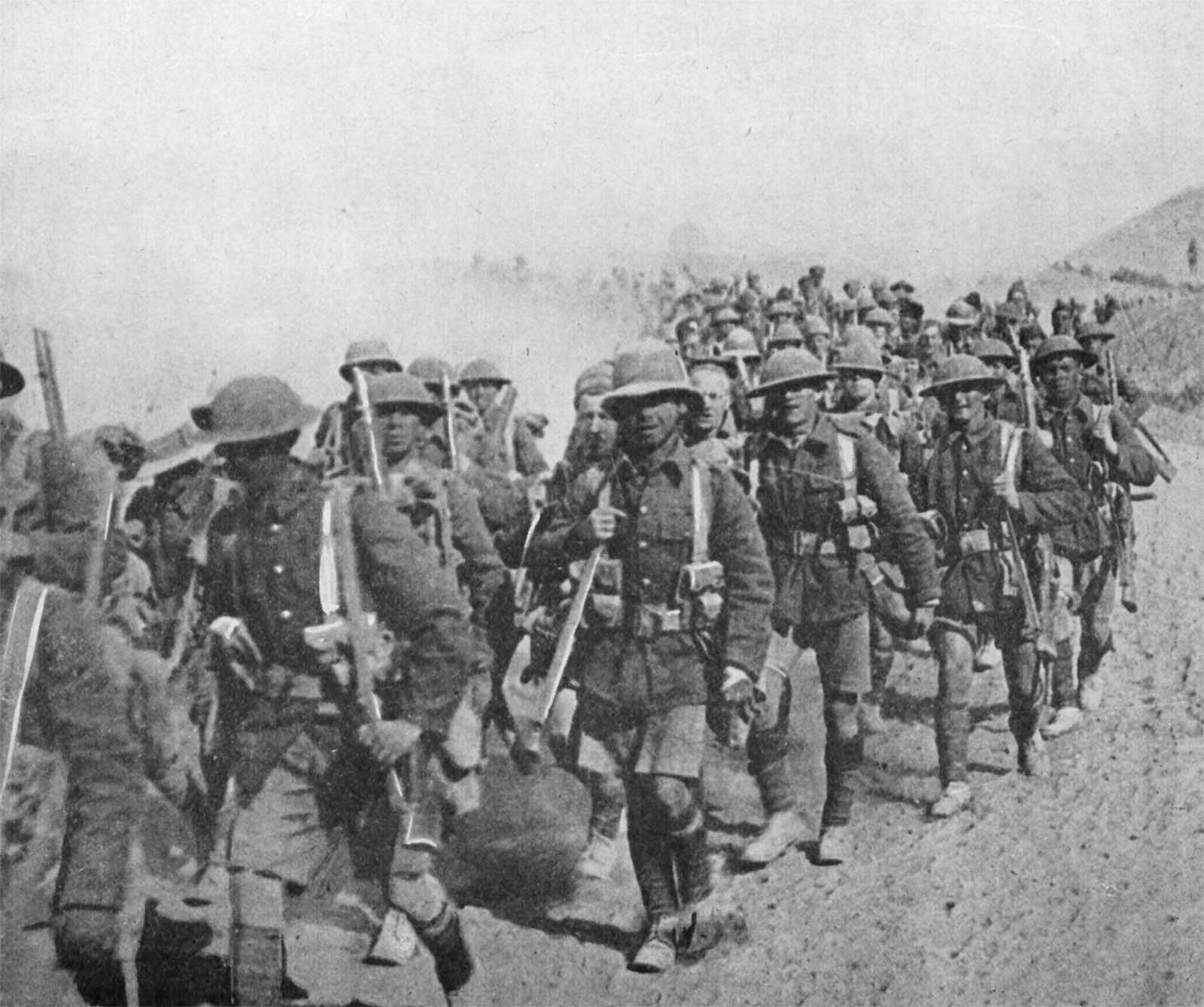
British troops on the march in Mesopotamia, 1917

France sent the French Armenian Legion to this theatre as part of its larger French Foreign Legion. Foreign Minister Aristide Briand needed to provide troops for French commitment made in the Sykes-Picot Agreement, which was still secret. Boghos Nubar, the leader of the Armenian national assembly, met with Sir Mark Sykes and Georges-Picot.

General Edmund Allenby, the commander of the Egyptian Expeditionary Force, extended the original agreement. The Armenian Legion fought in Palestine and Syria. Many of its volunteers were later released from the Legion to join their respective national armies.

The Armenian national liberation movement commanded the Armenian Fedayee (Armenian: Ֆէտայի) during these conflicts. These were generally referred to as Armenian militia. In 1917, The Dashnaks established an Armenian Corps under the command of General Tovmas Nazarbekian which, with the declaration of the First Republic of Armenia, became the military core of this new Armenian state. Nazarbekian became the first Commander-in-chief.

==== Recruitment ====
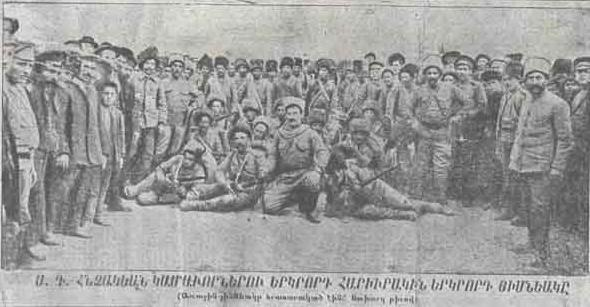
A group of Armenians responding to Russian recruitment for the Armenian volunteer units

Before the war, Russia established a volunteer system to be used in the Caucasus Campaign. In the summer of 1914, Armenian volunteer units led by Andranik Ozanian were established under the Russian Armed forces. As the Russian Armenian conscripts had already been sent to the European Front, this force was uniquely established from Armenians that were neither Russian subjects nor obliged to serve. The Armenian units were credited with no small measure of the success gained by the Russian forces, as they were natives of the region, adjusted to the climatic conditions, familiar with every road and mountain path, and had real incentives to fight.

The Armenian volunteers were small, mobile, and well adapted to the semi-guerrilla warfare. They did good work as scouts, but also took part in numerous pitched battles.

In December 1914, Nicholas II of Russia visited the Caucasus Campaign. Addressing the head of the Armenian Church, and Alexander Khatisyan, president of the Armenian National Bureau in Tiflis, he said:

From all countries Armenians are hurrying to enter the ranks of the glorious Russian Army, with their blood to serve the victory of the Russian Army... Let the Russian flag wave freely over the Dardanelles and the Bosporus. Let [...] the peoples [Armenian] remaining under the Turkish yoke receive freedom. Let the Armenian people of Turkey who have suffered for the faith of Christ receive resurrection for a new free life ....

— Nicholas II of Russia

=== Asymmetrical forces ===
The forces used in the Middle Eastern theatre were not only regular army units which engaged in conventional warfare, but also irregular forces engaging in what is known today as "asymmetrical conflict".

Contrary to myth, it was not T. E. Lawrence or the British Army that conceptualised a campaign of internal insurgency against the Ottoman Empire in the Middle East: it was the Arab Bureau of Britain's Foreign Office that devised the Arab Revolt. The Arab Bureau had long felt it likely that a campaign instigated and financed by outside powers, supporting the breakaway-minded tribes and regional challengers to the Ottoman government's centralised rule of their empire, would pay great dividends in the diversion of effort that would be needed to meet such a challenge. The Ottoman authorities devoted far more resources to contain the threat of such an internal rebellion than the Allies devoted to sponsoring it.

Germany established its own Intelligence Bureau for the East just before the outbreak of war. It was dedicated to promoting and sustaining subversive and nationalist agitations in the British Indian Empire, as well as in the Persian and Egyptian satellite states. Its operations in Persia, aimed at fomenting trouble for the British in the Persian Gulf, were led by Wilhelm Wassmuss, a German diplomat who became known as the "German Lawrence of Arabia" or "Wassmuss of Persia".

== Chronology ==
=== Prelude ===
The Ottoman Empire made a secret German–Ottoman alliance on 2 August 1914, followed by another treaty with Bulgaria. The Ottoman War ministry developed two major plans. Bronsart von Schellendorf, a member of the German military mission to the Ottoman Empire who had been appointed Assistant Chief of the Ottoman General Staff, completed a plan on 6 September 1914 by which the Fourth Army was to attack Egypt and the Third Army would launch an offensive against the Russians in Eastern Anatolia.

There was opposition to Schellendorf among the Ottoman army. The most voiced opinion was that Schellendorf planned a war which benefitted Germany, rather than taking into account the conditions of the Ottoman Empire. Hafiz Hakki Pasha presented an alternative plan, which was more aggressive, and concentrated on Russia. It was based on moving forces by sea to the eastern Black Sea coast, where they would develop an offensive against Russian territory. Hafiz Hakki Pasha's plan was shelved because the Ottoman Army lacked the resources. Schellendorf's "Primary Campaign Plan" was therefore adopted by default.

As a result of Schellendorf's plan, most of the Ottoman operations were fought in Ottoman territory, with the result that in many cases they directly affected the Empire's own people. The later view was that the resources to implement this plan were also lacking, but Schellendorf organised the command and control of the army better, and positioned the army to execute the plans. Schellendorf also produced a better mobilisation plan for raising forces and preparing them for war. The Ottoman War Ministry's archives contain war plans drafted by Schellendorf, dated 7 October 1914, which include details regarding Ottoman support to the Bulgarian army, a secret operation against Romania, and Ottoman soldiers landing in Odessa and Crimea with the support of the German Navy.

Such was the German influence on Turkey's operations during the Palestine campaign that most of the staff posts in the Yıldırım Army Group were held by German officers. Even the headquarters correspondence was produced in German. This situation ended with the final defeat in Palestine and the appointment of Mustafa Kemal to command the remnants of the Yildirim Army Group.

During July 1914 there were negotiations between the Committee of Union and Progress (CUP) and Ottoman Armenians at the Armenian congress at Erzurum. The public conclusion of the congress was "Ostensibly conducted to peacefully advance Armenian demands by legitimate means". Erickson claims that the CUP regarded the congress as a cause of Armenian insurrection. and that after this meeting, the CUP was convinced of the existence of strong Armenian–Russian links, with detailed plans to detach the region from the Ottoman Empire.

On 29 October 1914, the Ottoman Empire's first armed engagement with the Allies occurred when the German battlecruiser SMS Goeben and light cruiser SMS Breslau, having been pursued into Turkish waters and transferred to the Ottoman navy, shelled the Russian Black Sea port of Odessa.

Pre-War Period

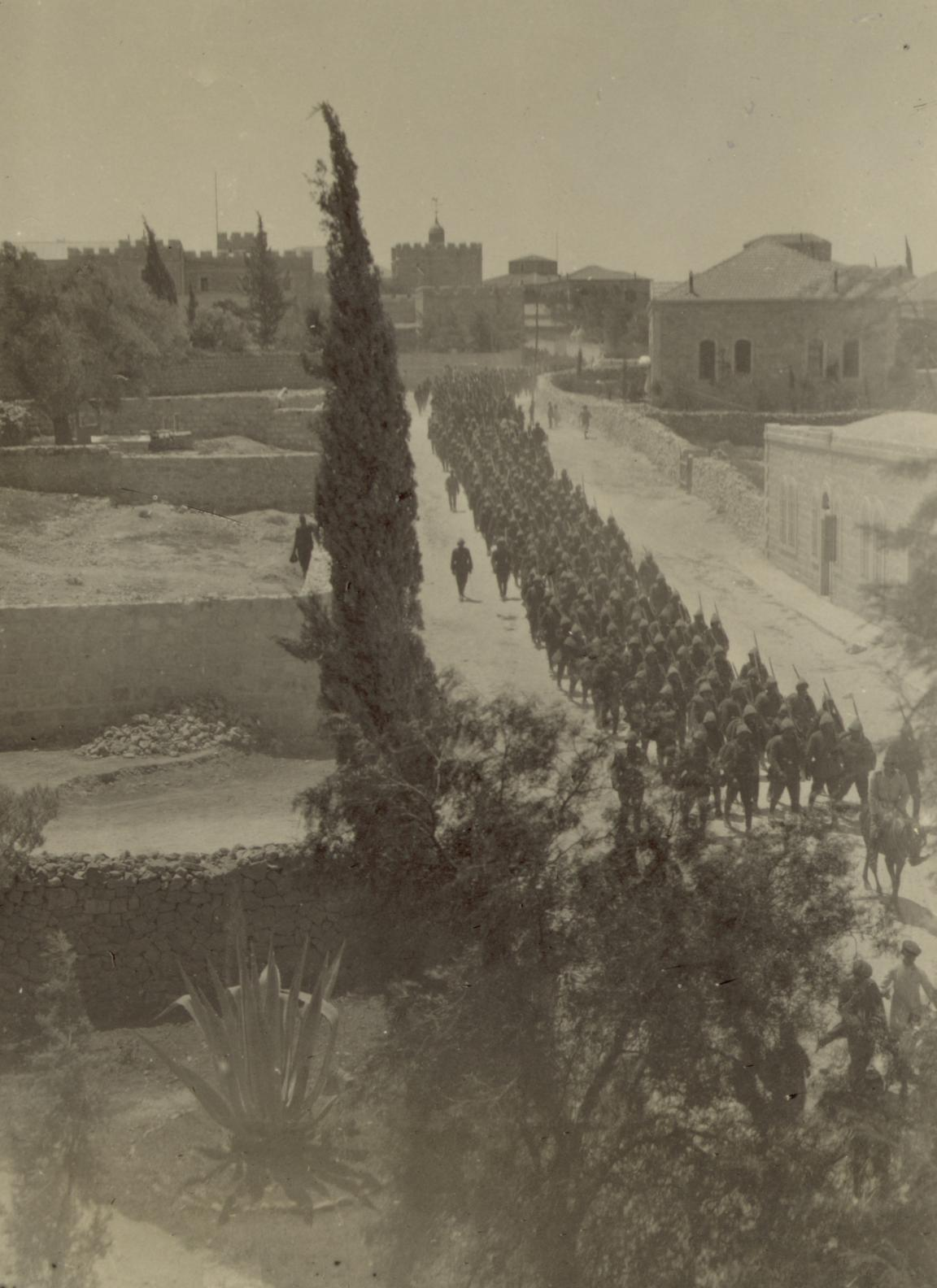
New Turkish recruits marching out to a drill before the war, 1914.

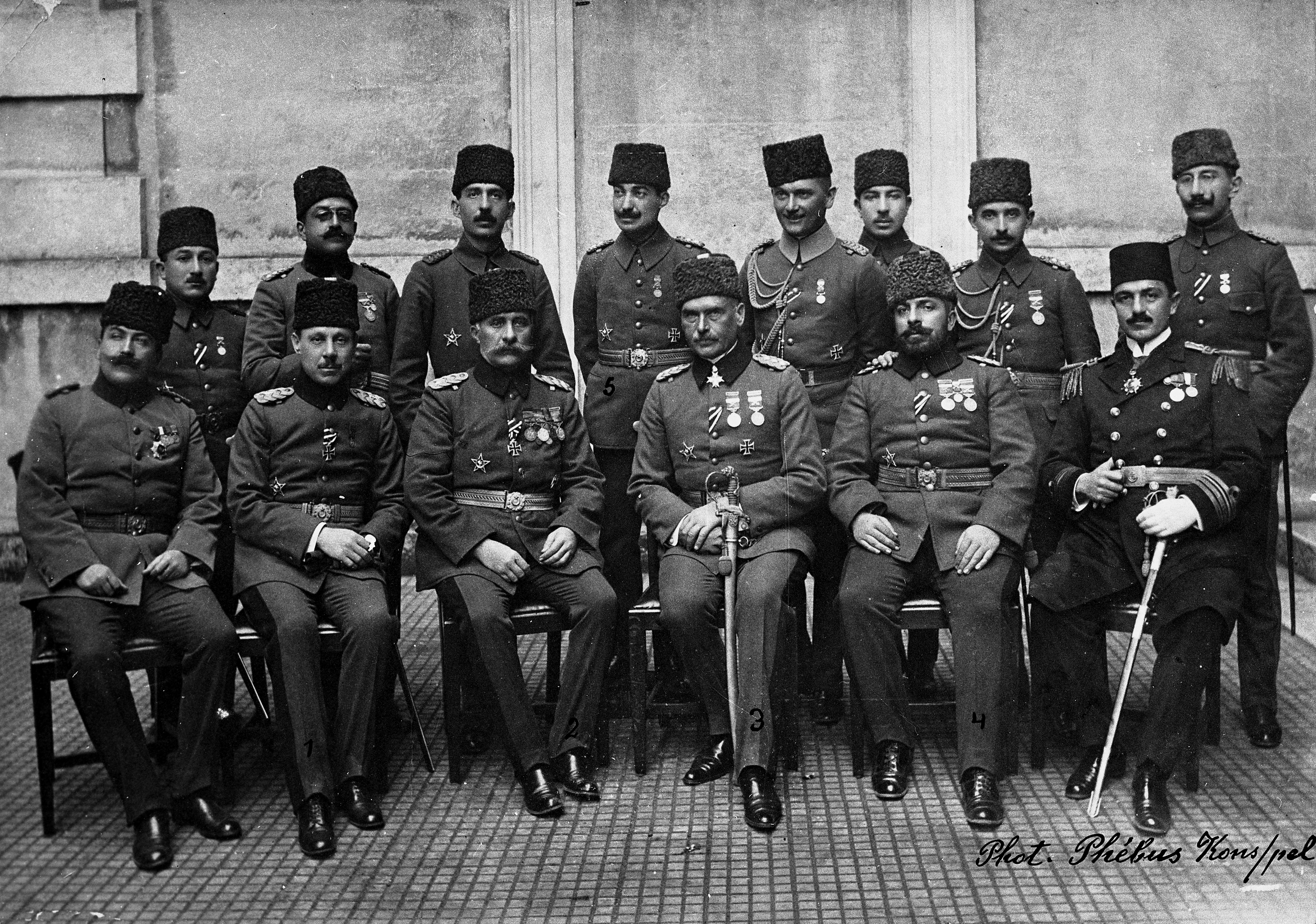
The Turkish general staff of the Sinai and Palestine Campaign, 1914.

=== 1914 ===
==== November ====
Following the shelling of Odessa, Russia declared war on the Ottoman Empire on 2 November 1914. The British Navy attacked the Dardanelles on 3 November. Britain and France declared war on 5 November. The Ottoman declaration of Jihad was drafted on 11 November and first publicized on 14 November.

First Lord of the Admiralty Winston Churchill put forward his plans for a naval attack on the Ottoman capital, based at least in part on what turned out to be erroneous reports regarding Ottoman troop strength, as prepared by Lieutenant T. E. Lawrence. He reasoned that the Royal Navy had a large number of obsolete battleships which might be made useful, supported by a token force from the army for routine occupation tasks. The battleships were ordered to be ready by February 1916.

At the same time, the Ottoman Fourth Army was preparing a force of 20,000 men under the command of the Ottoman Minister of the Marine, Djemal Pasha, to take the Suez Canal. The attack on Suez was suggested by War Minister Enver Pasha at the urging of their German ally. The chief of staff for the Ottoman Fourth Army was the Bavarian Colonel Kress von Kressenstein, who organised the attack and arranged supplies for the army as it crossed the desert.

On 1 November, the Bergmann Offensive was the first armed conflict of the Caucasus Campaign. The Russians crossed the frontier first, and planned to capture Doğubeyazıt and Köprüköy. On their right wing, the Russian I Corps moved from Sarikamish toward Köprüköy. On the left wing, the Russian IV Corps moved from Yerevan to the Pasinler Plains. The commander of the Ottoman Third Army, Hasan Izzet, was not in favour of an offensive in the harsh winter conditions, but his plan to remain on the defensive and to launch a counterattack at the right time was overridden by the War Minister Enver Pasha.

On 6 November, a British naval force bombarded the old fort at Fao. The Fao Landing of British Indian Expeditionary Force D (IEF D), consisting of the 6th (Poona) Division led by Lieutenant General Arthur Barrett, with Sir Percy Cox as political officer, was opposed by 350 Ottoman troops and four cannons. On 22 November, the British occupied the city of Basra against a force of 2900 Arab conscripts of the Iraq Area Command commanded by Suphi Pasha. Suphi Pasha and 1,200 men were captured. The main Ottoman army, under the overall command of Khalil Pasha, was located about 440 kilometres (270 mi) to the north-west, around Baghdad. It made only weak attempts to dislodge the British.

On 7 November, the Ottoman Third Army commenced its Caucasus offensive with the participation of the XI Corps and all cavalry units supported by the Kurdish Tribal Regiment. By 12 November, Ahmet Fevzi Pasha's IX Corps reinforced with the XI Corps on the left flank supported by the cavalry, began to push the Russians back. The Russians were successful along the southern shoulders of the offensive, where Armenian volunteers were effective and took Karaköse and Doğubeyazıt. By the end of November, the Russians held a salient 25 kilometres (16 mi) into Ottoman territory along the Erzurum-Sarikamish axis.

Sheikh Mubarak Al-Sabah, the ruler of Kuwait, sent a force to Umm Qasr, Safwan, Bubiyan, and Basra to expel Ottoman forces from the area. In exchange the British government recognised Kuwait as an "independent government under British protection." There is no report on the exact size and nature of Mubarak's attack, though Ottoman forces did retreat from those positions weeks later. Mubarak removed the Ottoman symbol that was on the Kuwaiti flag and replaced it with "Kuwait" written in Arabic script. Mubarak's participation, as well as his previous exploits in obstructing the completion of the Baghdad railway, helped the British safeguard the Persian Gulf from Ottoman and German reinforcements.

November 1914

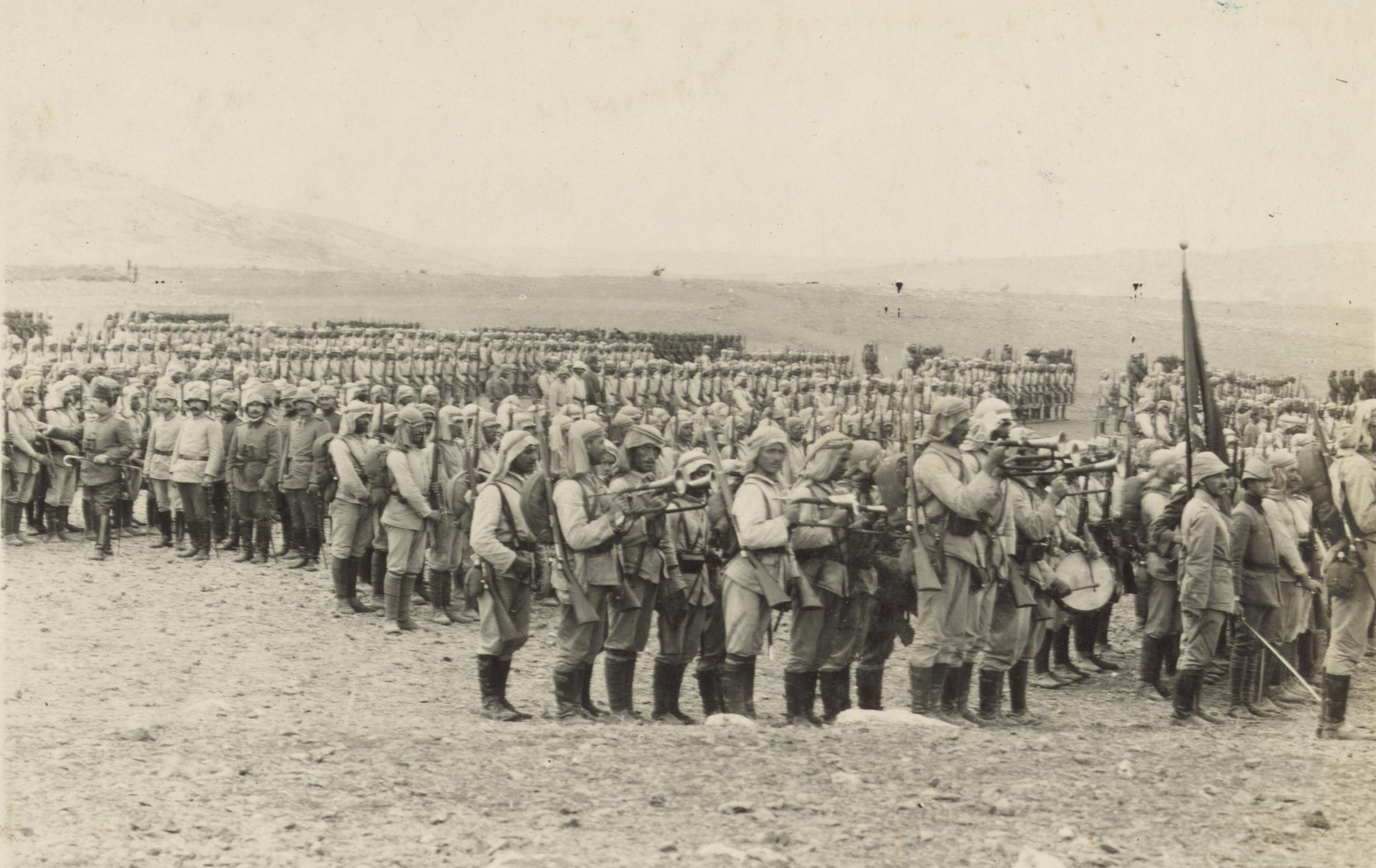
Ottoman forces preparation for the attack on the Suez Canal, 1914.

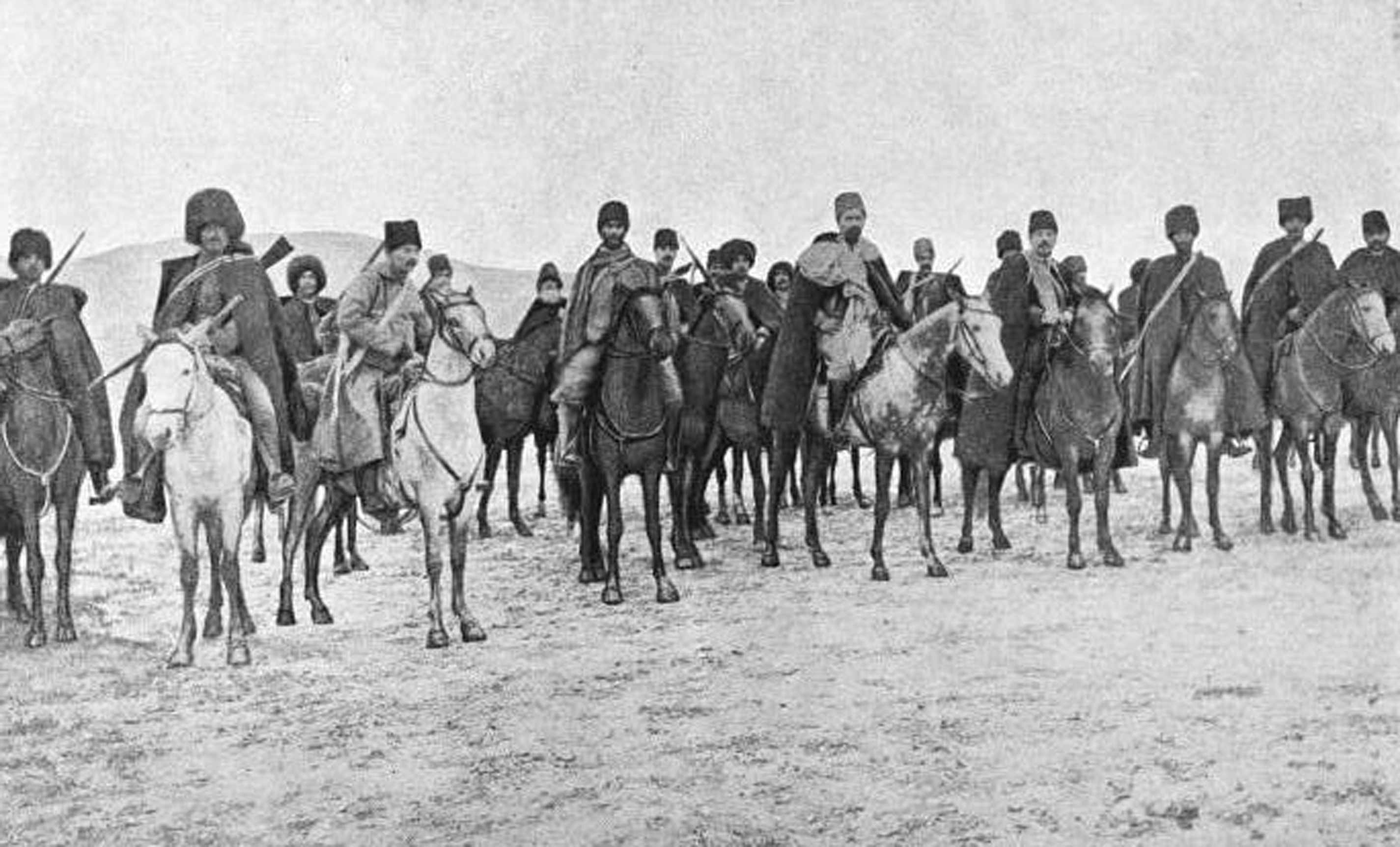
Personnel from the Armenian volunteers including Khetcho, Dro, and Armen Garo, 1914.

==== December ====
In December, at the height of the Battle of Sarikamish, General Myshlaevsky ordered the withdrawal of Russian forces from the Persian Campaign to face Enver's offensive. Only one brigade of Russian troops under the command of the Armenian General Nazarbekoff and one battalion of Armenian volunteers remained scattered throughout Salmast and Urmia. While the main body of Ottoman troops were preparing for the operation in Persia, a small Russian group crossed the Persian frontier. After repulsing a Russian offensive toward Van-Persia mountain crossings, the Van Gendarmerie Division, a lightly equipped paramilitary formation commanded by Major Ferid, chased the Russians into Persia.

On 14 December, the Van Gendarmerie Division occupied the city of Kotur in the Persian Campaign. Later, it proceeded towards Khoy. It was supposed to keep this passage open for Kazım Bey's 5th Expeditionary Force and Halil Bey's 1st Expeditionary Force, who were to move towards Tabriz from the bridgehead established at Kotur. However, the Battle of Sarıkamısh depleted the Ottoman forces and these expeditionary forces were needed elsewhere.

On 29 December, the Ottoman Third Army received the order to advance towards Kars. Enver Pasha assumed personal command of the Third Army and ordered his forces to move against the Russian troops, beginning the Battle of Sarikamish. In the face of the Third Army's advance, Governor Vorontsov planned to pull the Russian Caucasus Army back to Kars. General Nikolai Yudenich ignored Vorontsov's order.

December 1914

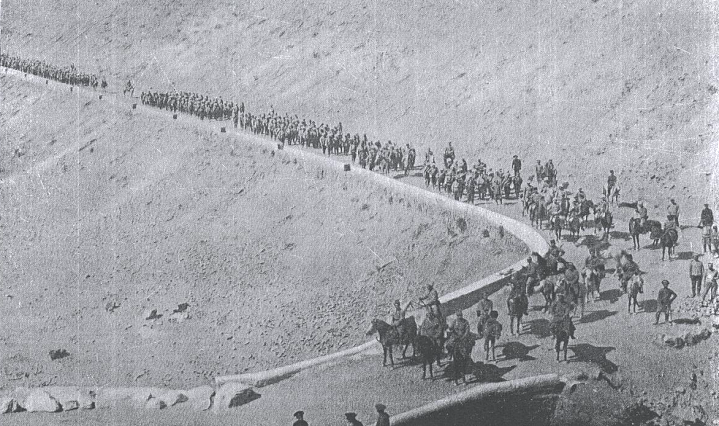
Zoravar Andranik's 1st battalion of Armenians were scattered throughout the Salmast and Urmia districts in the early parts of the Persian Campaign, December 1914.

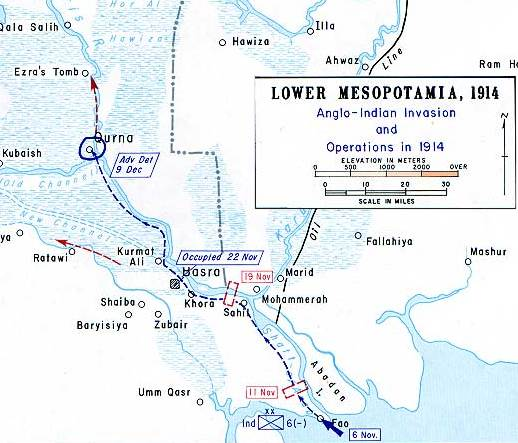
The initial British offensive during the Mesopotamian campaign, 1914

=== 1915 ===
==== January–March ====
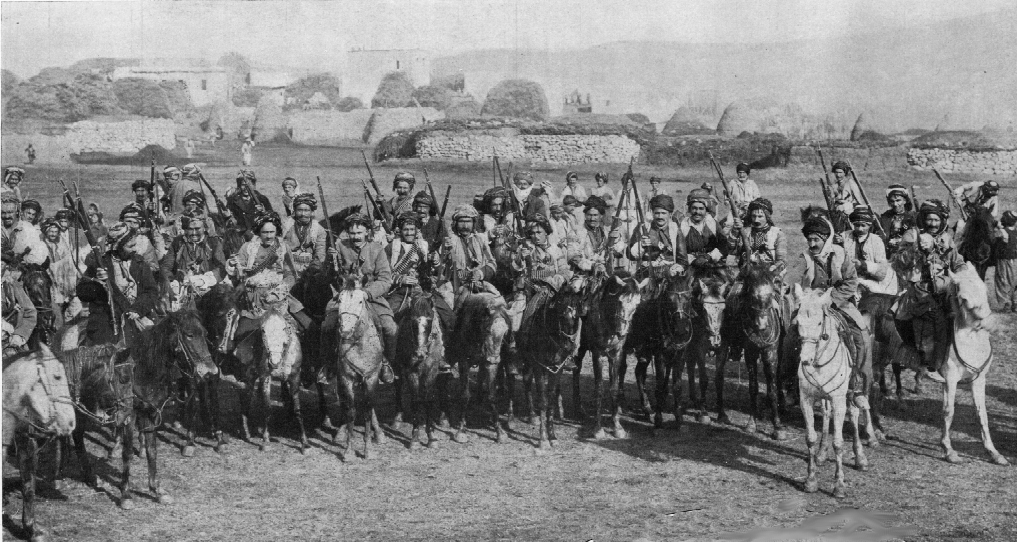
Kurdish Cavalry, employed by the Ottomans against the Russians in the passes of the Caucasus, January 1915

On 2 January, Süleyman Askeri Bey assumed the Iraq Area Command. Enver Pasha realised the mistake of underestimating the importance of the Mesopotamian campaign. The Ottoman Army did not have any other resources to move to this region, as an attack on Gallipoli was imminent. Süleyman Askeri Bey sent letters to Arab sheiks in an attempt to organise them to fight against the British.

On 3 January, at the Battle of Qurna, Ottoman forces tried to retake the city of Basra. They came under fire from Royal Navy vessels on the river Euphrates, while British troops managed to cross the river Tigris. Judging that Basra's earthworks were too strong to be taken, the Ottomans surrendered the town of Al-Qurnah and retreated to Kut.

On 6 January, the Third Army headquarters found itself under fire. Hafiz Hakki Pasha ordered a total retreat at the Battle of Sarikamish. Only 10% of the army managed to retreat to its starting position. Enver gave up command of the army. During this conflict, Armenian detachments challenged the Ottoman operations at the critical times: "the delay enabled the Russian Caucasus Army to concentrate sufficient force around Sarikamish".

The British and France asked Russia to relieve the pressure on Western front, but Russia needed time to organise its forces. The operations in the Black Sea gave them the chance to replenish their forces; also the Gallipoli Campaign drew many Ottoman forces from the Russian and other fronts. In March 1915, the Ottoman Third army received reinforcements amounting to a division from the First and Second Armies.

On 19 February, a strong Anglo-French fleet, including the British battleship HMS Queen Elizabeth, bombarded artillery positions along the coast around the Dardanelles. Admiral Sackville Carden sent a cable to Churchill on 4 March, stating that the fleet could expect to arrive in Constantinople within fourteen days. On 18 March the first major attack was launched. The fleet, comprising 18 battleships and an array of cruisers and destroyers, sought to target the narrowest point of the Dardanelles where the straits are just a mile wide.

The Bouvet exploded in mysterious circumstances, causing it to capsize with its entire crew aboard. Minesweepers, manned by civilians and under constant fire from Ottoman guns, retreated leaving the minefields largely intact. The battleship HMS Irresistible and battlecruiser HMS Inflexible both sustained critical damage from mines, although there was confusion during the battle whether torpedoes were to blame. The battleship HMS Ocean, sent to rescue the Irresistible, was itself mined and both ships eventually sank. The French battleships Suffren and Gaulois were also badly damaged. The losses prompted the Allies to cease any further attempts to force the straits by naval power alone.

In February, General Yudenich was promoted to command the Russian Caucasus Army, replacing Aleksandr Zakharevich Myshlayevsky. On 12 February, the commander of the Ottoman Third Army, Hafiz Hakki Pasha, died of typhus and was replaced by Brigadier General Mahmut Kamil Paşa. Kamil undertook the task of putting the depleted Third Army in order.

The Ottoman Empire tried to seize the Suez Canal in Egypt with the First Suez Offensive, and they supported the recently deposed Abbas II of Egypt, but were defeated by the British in both aims.

January–March 1915

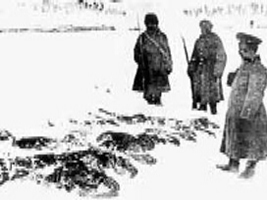
The Third Army lost soldiers to frost at the Battle of Sarikamish during the Caucasus Campaign, January 1915.

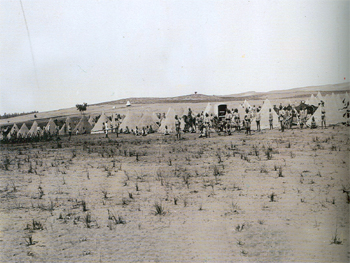
6th Army field HQ during the Mesopotamian campaign, 1915.

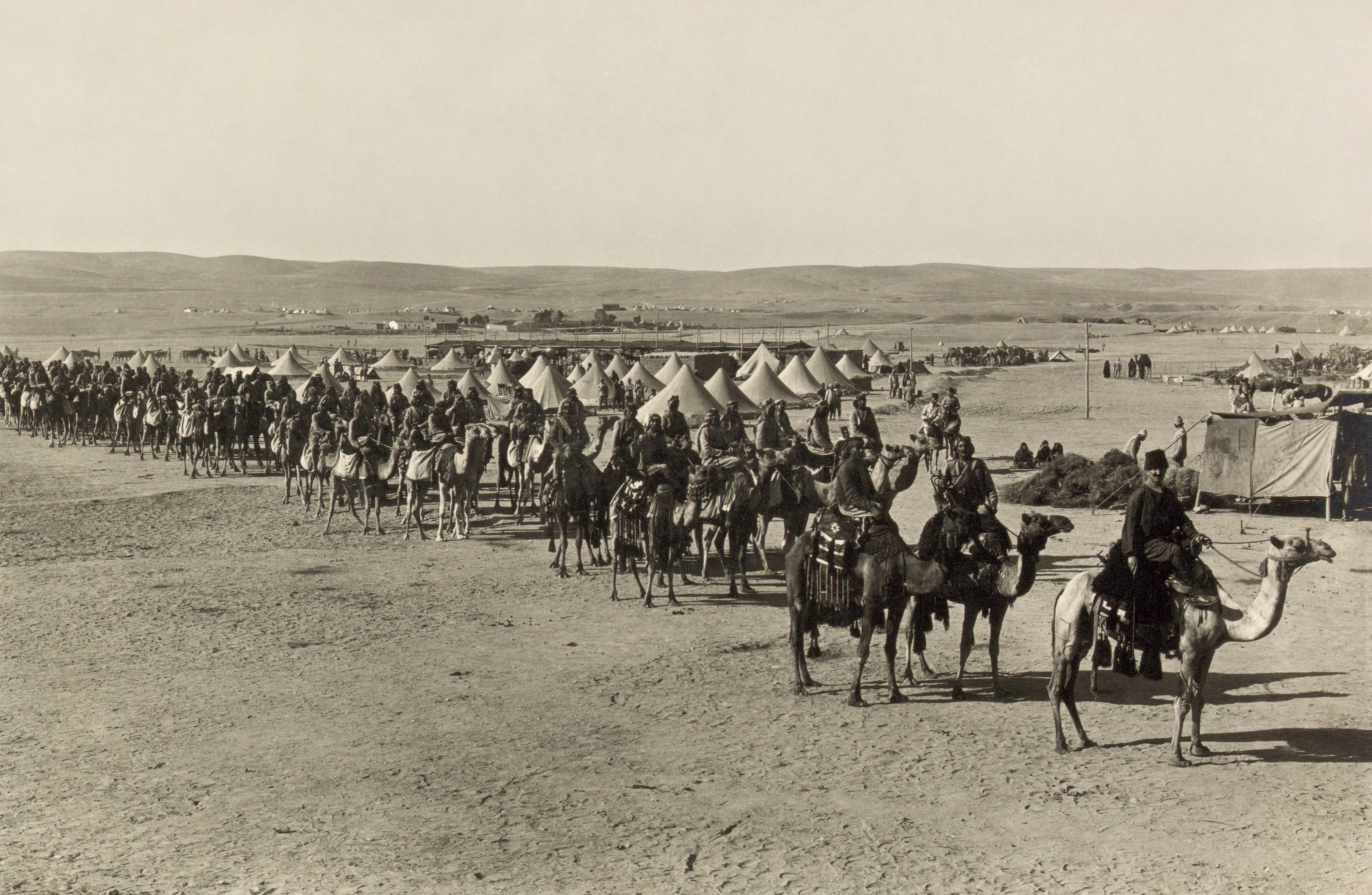
The camel corps at Beersheba during the Sinai and Palestine Campaign, February 1915.

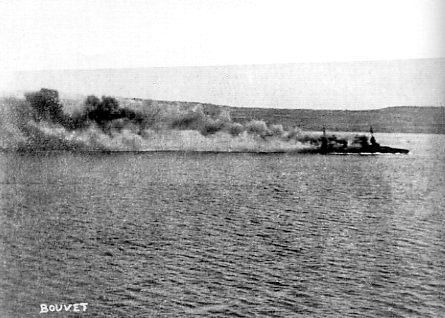
The Bouvet sinking during the Gallipoli Campaign, March 1915.

==== April–June ====
Following their unexpected success in the Mesopotamia Campaign, the British command decided on more aggressive operations. In April 1915, general Sir John Nixon was sent to take command. He ordered Major General Charles Vere Ferrers Townshend to advance to Kut or even to Baghdad if possible. Enver Pasha worried about the possible fall of Baghdad, and sent the German General Colmar Freiherr von der Goltz to take command.

On 12 April, Süleyman Askeri attacked the British camp at Shaiba with 3,800 troops early in the morning. These forces, mainly provided by Arab sheiks, achieved nothing. Süleyman Askeri was wounded. Disappointed and depressed, he shot himself at the hospital in Baghdad.

On 20 April, the Siege of Van began. On 24 April, Talat Pasha promulgated the order on April 24 (known by the Armenians as the Red Sunday) which stated that the Armenians in this region were led by Russians and had rebelled against Ottoman government.

The Allies began their amphibious assault on the Gallipoli Peninsula on the European side of the Dardanelles the following day. The troops were able to land, but could not dislodge the Ottoman forces even after months of battle that caused the deaths of an estimated 131,000 soldiers, and 262,000 wounded. Eventually they withdrew. The campaign represented something of a coming of age for Australia and New Zealand, who celebrate 25 April as ANZAC Day. Kemal Atatürk, who later became the first leader of modern Turkey, distinguished himself as a lieutenant colonel at Gallipoli.

On 6 May, General Yudenich began an offensive into Ottoman territory. One wing of this offensive headed towards Lake Van to relieve its Armenian defenders. The Fedayee turned over the city to the Russians. On 21 May, General Yudenich received the keys to the city and its citadel, and confirmed the Armenian provisional government in office with Aram Manukian as governor. With Van secure, fighting shifted farther west for the rest of the summer.

On 6 May, the Russian second wing advanced through the Tortum Valley towards Erzurum after the weather turned milder. The Ottoman 29th and 30th Divisions managed to stop this assault. The X Corps counter-attacked the Russian forces. On the southern front, the Ottomans were not as successful as they had been in the north.

The city of Manzikert had already fallen on 11 May. The Ottomans' supply lines were being cut, as the Armenian forces caused additional difficulties behind the lines. The region south of Lake Van was extremely vulnerable. During May, the Ottomans had to defend a line of more than 600 kilometres (370 mi) with only 50,000 men and 130 pieces of artillery. They were heavily outnumbered by the Russians.

On 27 May, during the high point of the Russian offensive, the Ottoman parliament passed the Tehcir Law. Talat Pasha, the Interior Minister, ordered a forced deportation of all Armenians from the regions under Ottoman control.

On 19 June, the Russians launched another offensive northwest of Lake Van. Commanded by Oganovski, they advanced into the hills west of Malazgrit, but had underestimated the size of the Ottoman forces. They were surprised by a large Ottoman force at the Battle of Manzikert. They were not aware that the Ottoman IX Corps, together with the 17th and 28th Divisions, was moving to Mush also.

The 1st and 5th Expeditionary Forces were positioned to the south of the Russian offensive force and a "Right Wing Group" was established under the command of Brigadier General Abdülkerim Paşa. This group was independent from the Third Army, and Abdülkerim Paşa was reporting directly to Enver Paşa.

April–June 1915

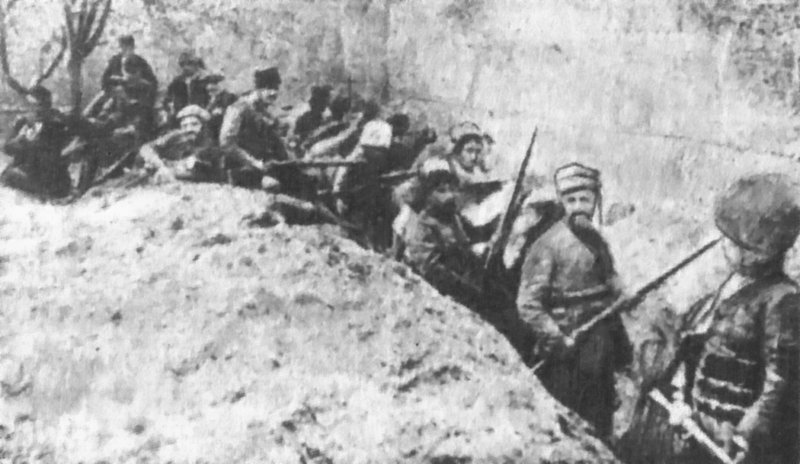
Armenian troops holding a defence line at the Siege of Van, April 1915.

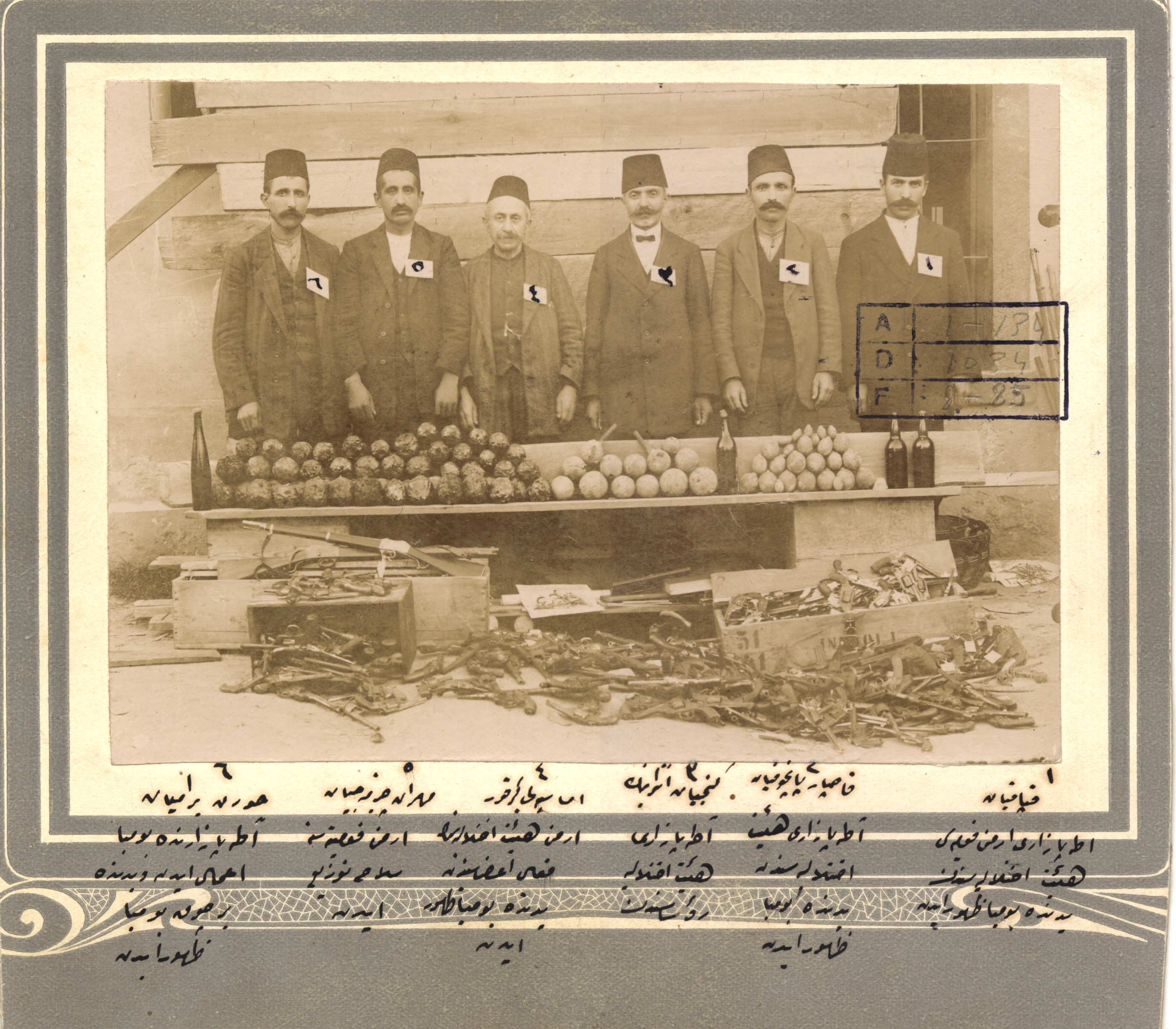
Armenian resistance members from the Adapazarı committee, 1915.

==== July–September ====
On 24 September, General Yudenich became the supreme commander of all Russian forces in the region. This front was quiet from October until the end of the year. Yudenich used this period to reorganise. By 1916, Russian forces in the theatre had grown to 200,000 men and 380 pieces of artillery.

On the other side the situation was very different; the Ottoman High Command failed to make up the losses during this period. The war in Gallipoli was using up all available resources and manpower. The IX, X and XI Corps could not be reinforced, and the 1st and 5th Expeditionary Forces were deployed to Mesopotamia. Enver Pasha, after failing to achieve his ambitions in the Caucasus, and possibly recognising the dire situation on other fronts, decided that the Caucasus front was of secondary importance.

July–September 1915

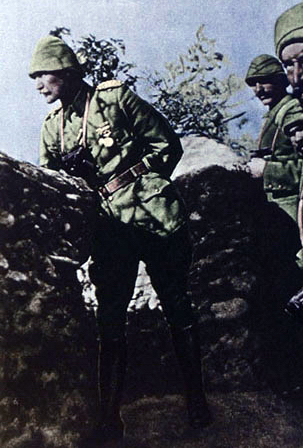
Mustafa Kemal at Gallipoli with his soldiers, 1915.

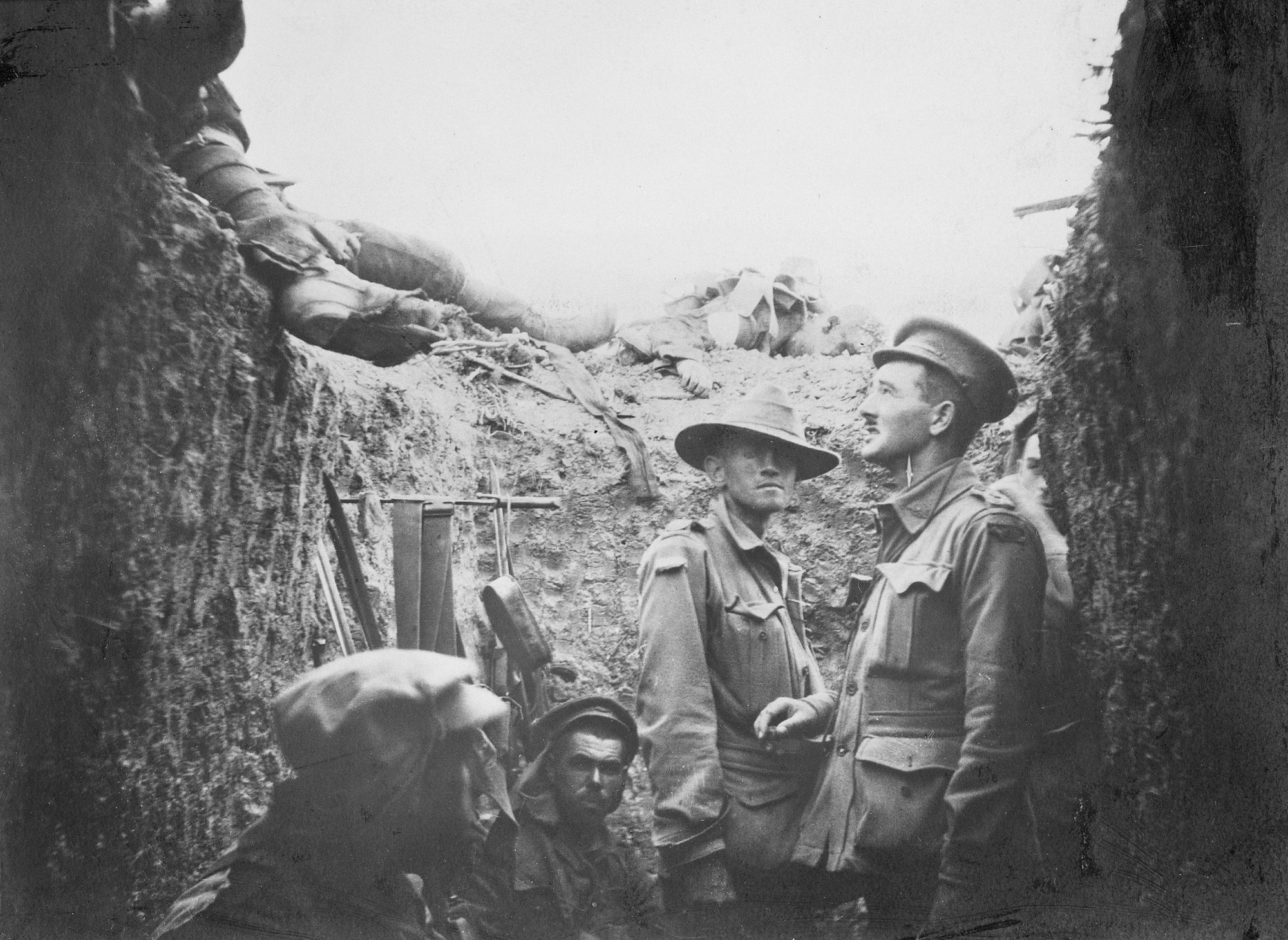
A trench at Lone Pine after the battle, showing Australian and Turkish dead on the parapet, 1915.

==== October–December ====
The rapid advance of the British up the river changed some of the Arab tribes' perception of the conflict. Realising that the British had the upper hand, many of them joined the British efforts. They raided Ottoman military hospitals and massacred the soldiers in Amara.

On 22 November, Townshend and von der Goltz fought the battle at Ctesiphon. The battle was inconclusive, as both the Ottomans and the British retreated from the battlefield. Townshend halted and fortified the position at Kut-al-Amara, and on 7 December with his forces were surrounded the siege of Kut began. Von der Goltz helped the Ottoman forces build defensive positions around Kut, and established new fortified positions down river to fend off any attempt to rescue Townshend. General Aylmer made three attempts to break the siege, but each effort was unsuccessful. Townshend surrendered his entire force on 29 April 1916.

In December, the British government continued their attempts to cultivate favour with Ibn Saud via its secret agent, Captain William Shakespear, but this was abandoned after Shakespear's death at the Battle of Jarrab. Instead, the British transferred support to Ibn Saud's rival Sharif Hussein bin Ali, leader of the Hejaz, with whom the Saudis were almost constantly at war. Lord Kitchener also appealed to Hussein bin Ali, Sharif of Mecca for assistance in the conflict; Hussein wanted political recognition in return. An exchange of letters with Henry McMahon assured him that his assistance would be rewarded after the war by granting him control of the territory between Egypt and Persia, with the exception of imperial possessions and interests in Kuwait, Aden, and the Syrian coast. Britain entered into the Treaty of Darin, which made the lands of the House of Saud a British protectorate. Ibn Saud pledged to again make war against Ibn Rashid, who was an ally of the Ottomans, and in exchange was given a monthly stipend.

October–December 1915

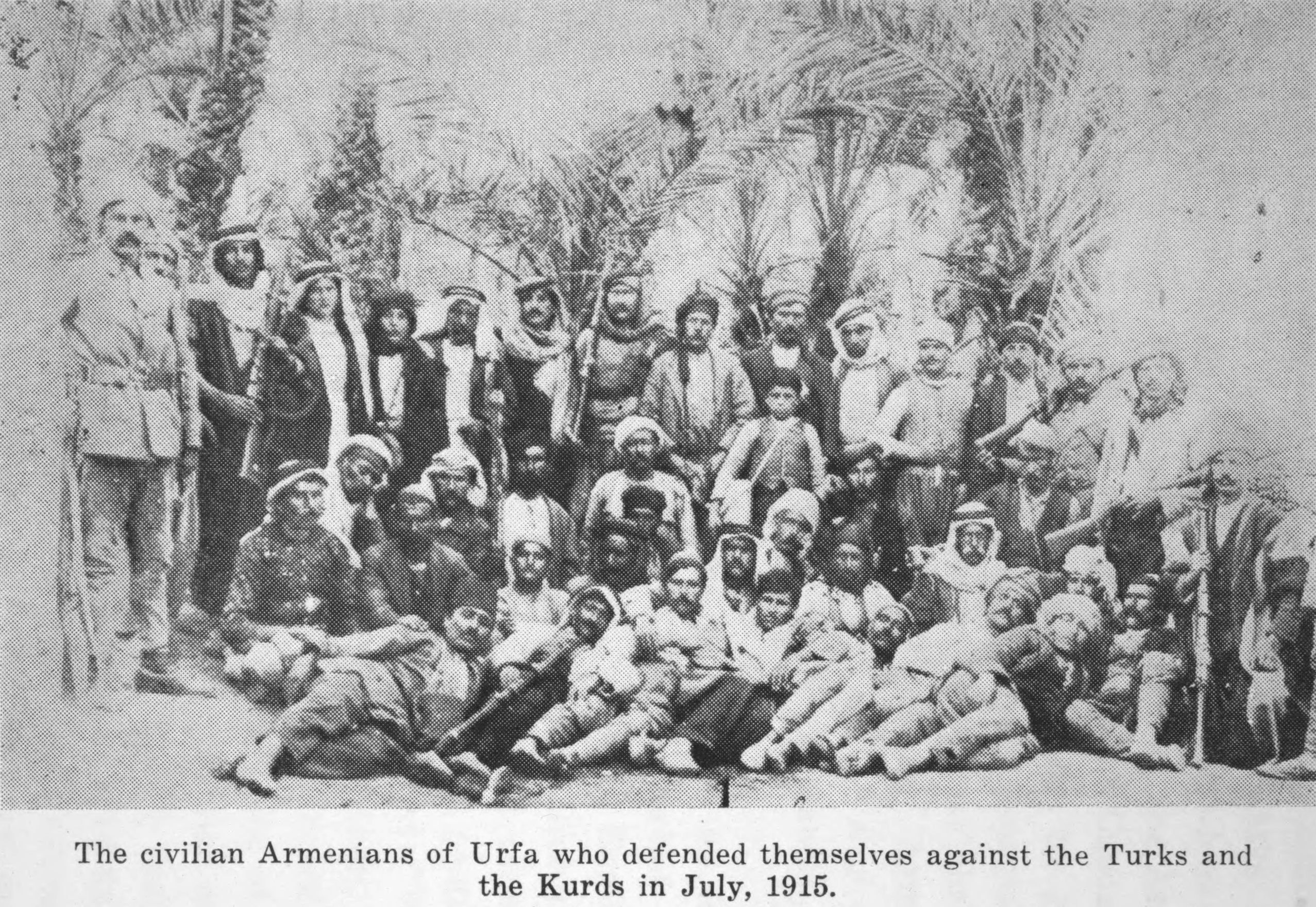
Defenders of the Urfa Resistance, July 1915.

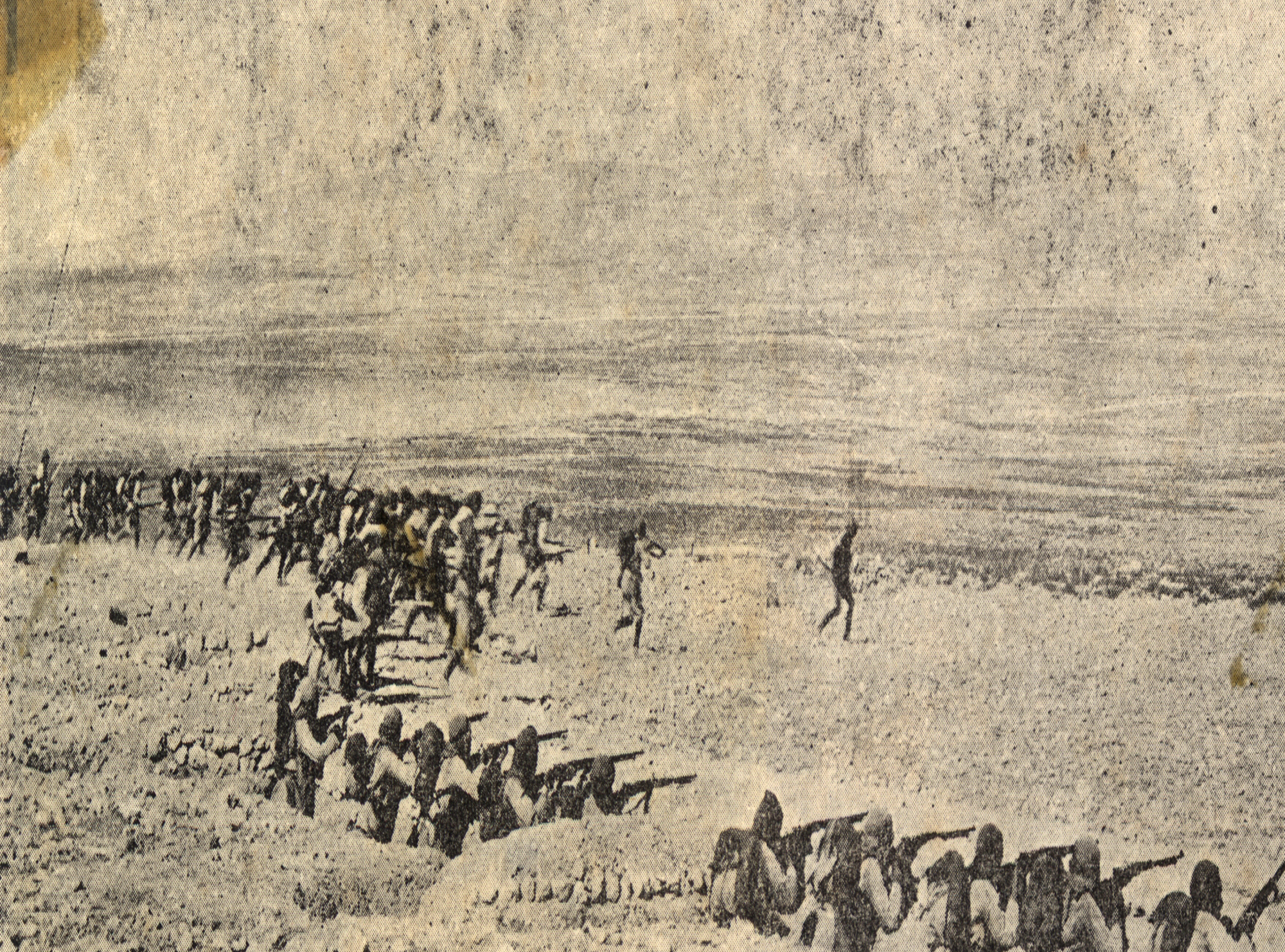
The trenches during the Siege of Kut, December 1915.

===== Battle of Robat Karim =====
Organizer of the popular forces against the Russian forces was Heydar Latifiyan who had been one of the supporters of the Persian Constitutional Revolution. The Russians advanced to Qazvin. With the possibility of the fall of Tehran, Parliament of Iran lost its majority and was dissolved. When Russia gave Iran an ultimatum to expel Morgan Shuster in the first year of the First World War, and the forces of this country entered Iran and came to Rabat Karim and attacked the forces of the National Defense Committee. Hassan Azam Qudsi (Azam Al-Wazara) from friends Hassan Modarres writes in his memoirs called "My Memories" about the first military encounter between the Russians and the national forces:

From one side, the Russian troops reach the village of Kolmeh (Fajr town), which is located between the Rabat Karim road and Tehran, and the local fighters are surrounded from three sides. The Russians start bombarding the area from almost a mile away. It is possible, but all the people survive. However, in the evening, the infantry riders of the Russian army come closer and the war with swords begins, and after a bloody clash, 70 people are killed.

Heyder was also killed like the rest of his comrades. According to the traditions of the local people, the Russians made it difficult to identify the bodies by cutting off the heads of the dead. The only identifiable body among the 70 people was Heydar Latifiyan, whose body was buried near an Imamzadeh above the village of Vahnabad.

=== 1916 ===
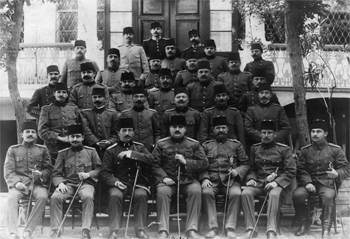
The Turkish general staff of the Mesopotamian campaign, 1916

In 1916, a combination of diplomacy and genuine dislike of the new leaders of the Ottoman Empire (the Three Pashas) convinced Sharif Hussein bin Ali of Mecca to begin a revolt. He gave the leadership of this revolt to two of his sons: Faisal and Abdullah with financial and logistical support from the British, T. E. Lawrence playing a key role.

The Russian offensive in northeastern Turkey started with a victory at the Battle of Koprukoy and culminated with the capture of Erzurum in February and Trabzon in April. By the Battle of Erzincan the Ottoman Third Army was no longer capable of launching an offensive nor could it stop the advance of the Russian Army.

The Ottoman forces launched a second attack across the Sinai with the objective of destroying or capturing the Suez Canal. Both this and the earlier attack (1915) were unsuccessful, though not very costly by the standards of the Great War. The British then went on the offensive, attacking east into Palestine. However, in 1917 two failed attempts to capture the Ottoman fort of Gaza resulted in sweeping changes to the British command and the arrival of General Allenby, along with many reinforcements.

=== 1917 ===
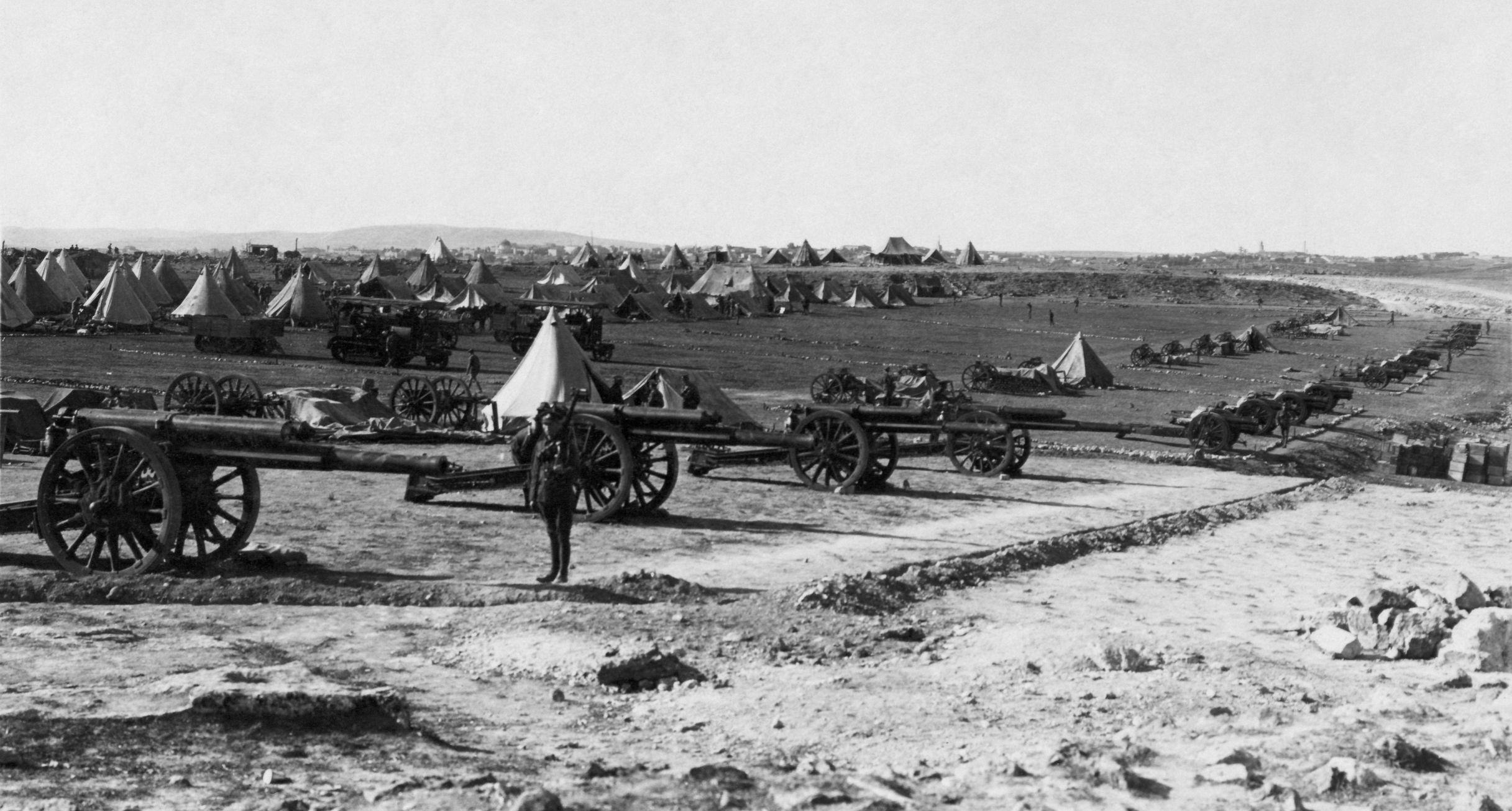
British artillery during the Battle of Jerusalem, 1917

British Empire forces reorganised and captured Baghdad in March 1917. On 16 December, the Armistice of Erzincan (Erzincan Cease-fire Agreement) was signed which officially brought the end of hostilities between the Ottoman Empire and the Russians. The Special Transcaucasian Committee also endorsed the agreement.

The Sinai and Palestine Campaign was dominated by the success of the revolt, which greatly aided General Allenby's operations. Late in 1917, Allenby's Egyptian Expeditionary Force smashed the Ottoman defences and captured Gaza, and then captured Jerusalem just before Christmas. While strategically of lesser importance to the war, this event was key in the subsequent creation of Israel as a separate nation in 1948.

=== 1918 ===
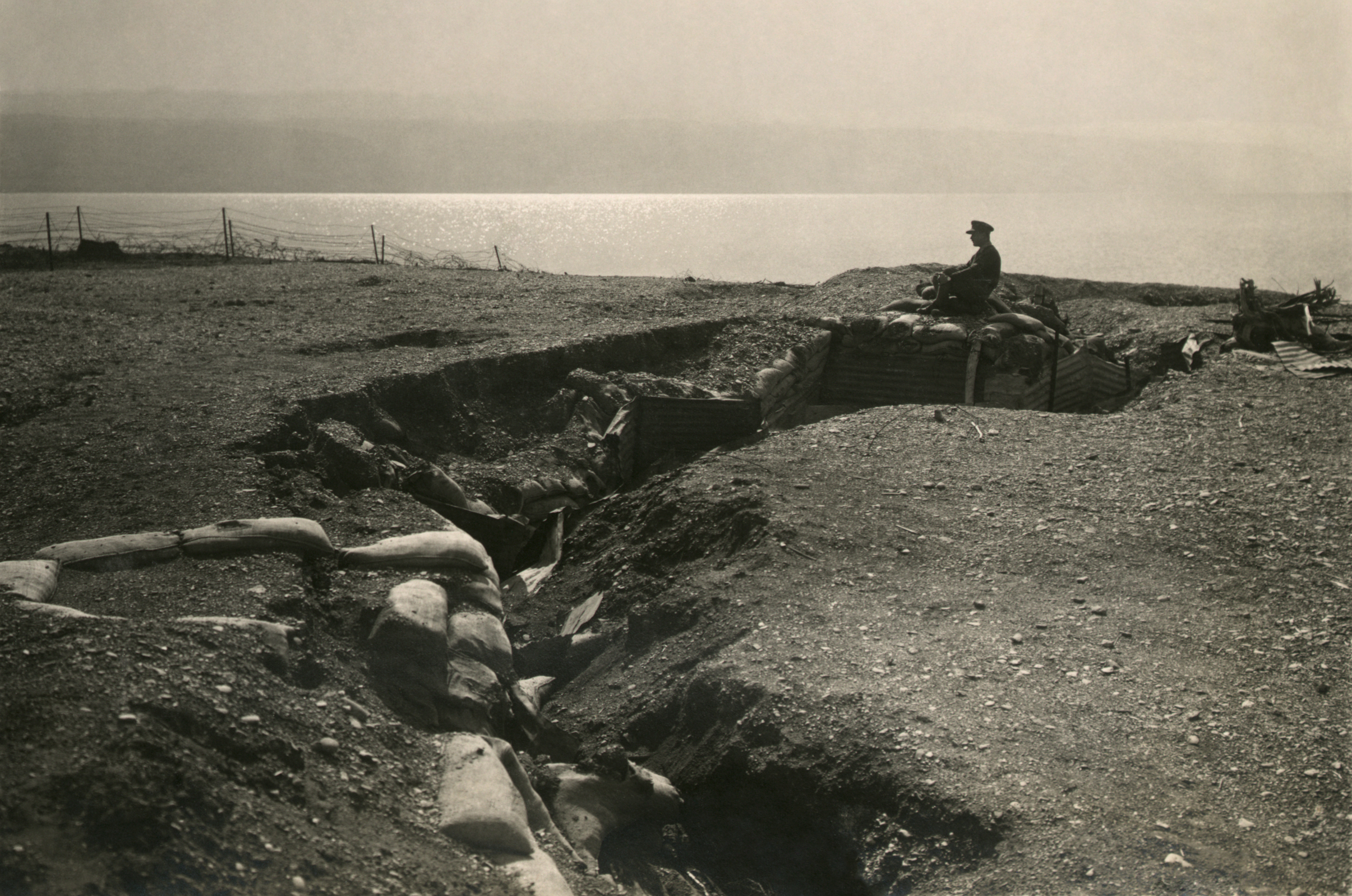
Ottoman trenches along the shores of the Dead Sea, 1918

The Allied Supreme War Council believed the war weary Ottoman Empire could be defeated with campaigns in Palestine and Mesopotamia, but the German Spring Offensive in France delayed the expected Allied attack. General Allenby was given brand new divisions recruited from India.

T. E. Lawrence and his Arab fighters staged many hit-and-run attacks on supply lines and tied down thousands of soldiers in garrisons throughout Palestine, Jordan, and Syria.

On 3 March the Grand Vizier Talat Pasha signed the Treaty of Brest-Litovsk with the Russian SFSR which stipulated that Bolshevik Russia cede Batum, Kars, and Ardahan to the Ottoman Empire. The Trabzon Peace Conference was held between March and April between the Ottoman Empire and the delegation of the Transcaucasian Diet (Transcaucasian Sejm) and government. The Treaty of Brest-Litovsk united the Armenian and Georgian territories.

Assyrians attacked the Fortress of Charah on March 16, 1918, after the murder of Mar Benyamin Shimun (killed on March 3). Simko Shikak, who was responsible for the murder of the Assyrian patriarch Mar Shimun was staying in the fortress. The fortress had never been conquered despite numerous attempts by the Persian government. During the battle, Simko was panic stricken after seeing the Assyrians rip apart his forces. While the battle was going on, Simko managed to flee, abandoning his men. After one day of fighting, the Kurds were decisively defeated. It is said that the river in Charah was completely red from the dead Shikak fighters.

Under the command of Agha Petros, the Assyrians had quite a few successful engagements over the Ottoman forces. Most notably at Suldouze where Petros' 1,500 horsemen overcame the forces of Kheiri Bey's (8,000 men). Petros also defeated the Ottomans in a major engagement at Sauj Bulak and drove them back to Rowanduz.

The First Republic of Armenia declared war on the Ottoman Empire. In early May 1918, the Ottoman army faced the Armenian Corps of Armenian National Councils, which soon declared the First Republic of Armenia. The Ottoman army captured Trabzon, Erzurum, Kars, Van, and Batum. The conflict led to the Battle of Sardarapat, the Battle of Kara Killisse (1918), and the Battle of Bash Abaran.

Although the Armenians managed to inflict a defeat on the Ottomans at the Battle of Sardarapat, the fight with the First Republic of Armenia ended with the Treaty of Batum in June 1918. Throughout the summer of 1918, under the leadership of Andranik Ozanian, Armenians in the mountainous Nagorno-Karabakh region resisted the Ottoman 3rd army and established the Republic of Mountainous Armenia. The Army of Islam, consisting of 14,000 men, avoided Georgia and marched to Baku, driving out the 1,000 Australian, British, Canadian and New Zealand troops in 14 September 1918 at the Battle of Baku.

In September 1918, General Allenby launched the Battle of Megiddo, with the Jewish Legion under his command, forcing Ottoman troops into a full scale retreat.

== Aftermath ==
On 30 October 1918, the Armistice of Mudros was signed aboard HMS Agamemnon in Mudros port on the island of Lemnos between the Ottoman Empire and the Triple Entente. Ottoman operations in the active combat theatres ceased.

=== Military occupation ===
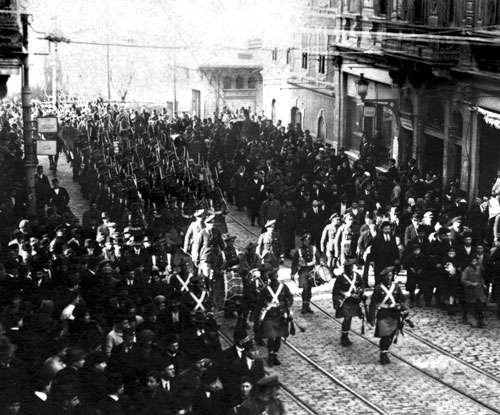
The Allied occupation of Istanbul

On 13 November 1918, the Occupation of Constantinople (present day Istanbul), the capital of the Ottoman Empire, occurred when French troops arrived, followed by British troops the next day. The occupation had two stages: the de facto stage from 13 November 1918 to 20 March 1920, and the de jure stage from de facto to the days following the Treaty of Lausanne. The occupation of Istanbul, along with the occupation of İzmir, contributed to the establishment of the Turkish national movement and led to the Turkish War of Independence.

=== Peace treaty ===
On 18 January 1919, peace negotiations began with the Paris Peace Conference. The negotiations continued at the Conference of London, but the treaty took definite shape only after the premiers' meeting at the San Remo conference in April 1920. France, Italy, and Great Britain had been secretly planning the partitioning of the Ottoman Empire as early as 1915. The Ottoman Government representatives signed the Treaty of Sèvres on 10 August 1920, but the treaty was not sent to the Ottoman Parliament for ratification, as the Parliament had been abolished on 18 March 1920 by the British. As a result, the treaty was never ratified by the Ottoman Empire. The Treaty of Sèvres was annulled in the course of the Turkish War of Independence, and the parties signed and ratified the superseding Treaty of Lausanne in 1923.

=== Abolition of the Caliphate ===
On 3 March 1924, the Ottoman Caliphate was abolished when Kemal Atatürk deposed the last caliph, Abdul Mejid II.

== Casualties ==
Allied military losses are placed around 1,000,000 including killed, wounded, captured or missing. This includes 303,000 British Empire and French casualties in Gallipoli (including 187,959 battle casualties), 168,000+ British Empire casualties in Sinai-Palestine (including 61,877 battle casualties), at least 140,000 Russian casualties in the Caucasus (including 119,000 battle casualties), and 256,000 British Empire casualties in Mesopotamia (including 85,197 battle casualties), as well as additional Russo-British losses in Persia. Most of the British casualties were non-battle casualties; total British battle casualties inflicted by the Ottomans were estimated as 264,000 by Field Marshal Lord Carver. Armenian and Assyrian insurgent losses are unknown. At least 20,000 Arab rebel troops were killed in the Arab Revolt.

Estimates for Ottoman military casualties vary widely, as the disintegration of the Ottoman bureaucracy and government meant 1,565,000 men simply became unaccounted for in the records following the end of the war. The Ottoman official casualty statistics published in 1922 were 325,000 dead (50,000 killed, 35,000 died of wounds, 240,000 died of disease), 400,000 wounded, and an unknown number of prisoners. The United States War Department used the same killed and wounded figures, and estimated that 250,000 Ottoman soldiers had gone missing or become prisoners before the end of the war, for a total of 975,000 casualties. American historian Edward J. Erickson, based on non-published individual World War I campaign histories in the Ottoman Archives, estimated Ottoman military casualties at 1,680,701: 771,844 dead/missing (175,220 killed in action, 68,378 died of wounds, 61,487 missing action, and 466,759 deaths due to disease), 695,375 wounded (total of 763,753 wounded including those who died of wounds and 303,150 actually listed in records; the author assumes these are only the seriously wounded, and estimates the rest), and 145,104 prisoners of war. The very high ratio of disease deaths to combat deaths is attributed to the breakdown of the Ottoman medical services, which resulted in afflictions that would normally be treated after evacuation from the theater in the British army often being fatal in the Ottoman army. Including those who died of disease, 3,515,471 Ottoman troops fell sick during World War I.

The significance of disease on this front can be best illustrated by comparing British the number of hospitalizations from disease/injury (frostbite, trench foot, etc.) in this theater to the Western Front. In France and Flanders, 2,690,054 British Empire troops were killed, wounded, died of wounds, missing, or captured, while there were 3,528,486 hospitalizations due to "non-battle casualties", a rate of 1.3 NBCs for every 1 battle casualty. In Mesopotamia there were 82,207 troops killed, wounded, died of wounds, missing, or captured, and 820,418 hospitalizations for sickness or injury, while in the Sinai and Palestine Campaign 51,451 men became battle casualties (not counting Indians) and 503,377 were hospitalized as non-battle casualties. In both cases, the rate is approximately 10 NBCs for every 1 battle casualty. Additionally, while by the listed numbers the Mesopotamia and Sinai-Palestine campaigns had only had 5% the battle casualties of the Western Front (136,658 v 2,690,054), they had over 70% of the disease deaths (22,693+ v 32,098).

Total Ottoman losses including civilians are recorded as being almost as high as 25% of the population, approximately 5 million deaths out of population of 21 million. The 1914 census gave 20,975,345 as the population size of the Ottoman Empire. Of these 15,044,846 were from the Muslim millet, 187,073 were from the Jewish millet, 186,152 did not belong to any millet and the remainder were spread across other millets. Turkish professor Kamer Kasim has stated that the cumulative percentage was actually 26.9% of the population (1.9% higher than the 25% reported by Western sources), the highest proportion of all the countries that took part in World War I. This increase of 1.9% represents an additional 399,000 civilians in the total number.

Not counting those later lost to the enemy, the Ottomans captured 1,314 pieces of artillery in World War I (mostly pieces in the 87 mm to 122 mm range). Most of these were Russian pieces, but this also included some of Romanian, German, and Japanese origin. Captured guns made up a significant portion of overall Ottoman artillery strength by the end of the war.

== See also ==
- Bombing of Constantinople in World War I
- Mediterranean, Middle East and African theatres of World War II
- Anglo-Egyptian Darfur Expedition
- Unification of Saudi Arabia

== Bibliography ==
- Erickson, Edward J. (2001). Ordered to Die: A History of the Ottoman Army in the First World War. Greenwood Publishing Group. ISBN 978-0-313-31516-9.
- Naayem, Joseph (1921). Shall This Nation Die?. New York: Chaldean Rescue. OCLC 1189853.
- Pasdermadjian, Garegin; Aram Torossian (1918). Why Armenia Should be Free: Armenia's Role in the Present War. Hairenik Pub. Co. p. 45.
- Pongiluppi, Francesco (2015). The Energetic Issue as a Key Factor of the Fall of the Ottoman Empire. in "The First World War: Analysis and Interpretation" (edited by Biagini and Motta), Vol. 2., Newcastle: Cambridge Scholars Publishing, pp. 453–464.
- Shaw, Stanford Jay; Shaw, Ezel Kural (1977). History of the Ottoman Empire and Modern Turkey. Cambridge University Press.
- Murphy, David (2008) The Arab Revolt 1916–18 Lawrence sets Arabia Ablaze. Osprey: London. ISBN 978-1-84603-339-1.
- Slot, B.J. (2005). Mubarak Al-Sabah: Founder of Modern Kuwait 1896–1915. London: Arabian Publishing. ISBN 9780954479244.
- Faik, Bulut (2005). Dersim Raporları (in Turkish). Istanbul: Evrensel Basım Yayın. ISBN 978-975-6106-02-0.
- Dersimi, Nuri (2012) [1952]. Kürdistan Tarihinde Dersim (in Turkish). Aleppo: Ani Matbaası. ISBN 978-975-6876-44-2.
