= IX Corps (Ottoman Empire) =

IX Corps Dokuzuncu Kolordu
- Active: 1911–
- Country: Ottoman Empire
- Type: Corps
- Garrison/HQ: Erzurum
- Patron: Ottoman Sultan
- Engagements: Caucasus Campaign (World War I); Battle of Sarikamish

Commanders
- Notable commanders: Mirliva Ahmet Fevzi Pasha; Mirliva Remzi Pasha; Mirliva Hüsamettin Pasha; Miralay Ali İhsan Bey (September 30, 1915-February 1916); Mirlaya Nurettin Bey (January–October 1916)

The IX Corps of the Ottoman Empire (Turkish: 9 ncu Kolordu or Dokuzuncu Kolordu) was one of the corps of the Ottoman Army. It was formed in the early 20th century during Ottoman military reforms.

== Formation ==
=== Order of Battle, 1911 ===
With further reorganizations of the Ottoman Army, to include the creation of corps level headquarters, by 1911 the IX Corps was headquartered in Erzurum. The Corps before the First Balkan War in 1911 was structured as such:

- IX Corps, Erzurum
  - 28th Infantry Division, Erzurum
    - 82nd Infantry Regiment, Erzurum
    - 83rd Infantry Regiment, Erzurum
    - 84th Infantry Regiment, Hasankale
    - 28th Rifle Battalion, Yemen
    - 28th Field Artillery Regiment, Erzurum
    - 28th Division Band, Erzurum
  - 29th Infantry Division, Bayburt
    - 85th Infantry Regiment, Bayburt
    - 86th Infantry Regiment, İşhan
    - 87th Infantry Regiment, Trabzon
    - 29th Rifle Battalion, Erzurum
    - 29th Field Artillery Regiment, Bayburt
    - 29th Division Band, Trabzon
- Units of IX Corps
- 9th Rifle Regiment, Erzurum
- 21st Cavalry Regiment, Erzurum
- 2nd Horse Artillery Battalion, Erzurum
- 9th Engineer Battalion, Erzurum
- 9th Transport Battalion, Erzurum
- Erzurum Fortified Area Command, Erzurum
  - 12th Heavy Artillery Regiment, Erzurum
  - Engineer Platoon, Erzurum
- Border companies x 12

== Balkan Wars ==
=== Order of Battle, July 1913 ===
- IX Corps (Caucasus)
  - 33rd Division

== World War I ==
=== Order of Battle, August 1914 ===
In August 1914, the corps was structured as follows:

- IX Corps (Caucasus)
  - 17th Division, 28th Division, 29th Division, 9th Cavalry Brigade

=== Order of Battle, November 1914, Late April 1915, Late Summer 1915, January 1916, August 1916 ===
In November 1914, Late April 1915, Summer 1915, January 1916, August 1916, the corps was structured as follows:

- IX Corps (Caucasus)
  - 17th Division, 28th Division, 29th Division
