= Ahmet Fevzi Big =

Ottoman general (1871–1947)

Ahmet Fevzi 1304-P. 38 Pasha
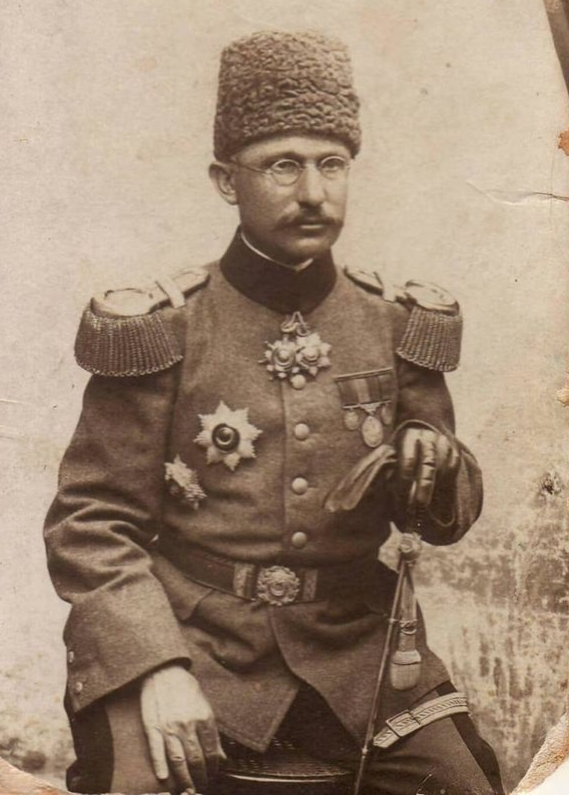
- Born: 1871; Düzce, Ottoman Empire
- Died: 1947 (aged 75–76); Istanbul, Turkey
- Military career
- Allegiance: Ottoman Empire
- Branch: Ottoman Army
- Service years: 1889–1920
- Rank: Major general
- Commands: IX Corps; XV Corps; Istanbul Central Command; Undersecretary of the War Ministry
- Conflicts: Balkan Wars; First World War; Turkish War of Independence

Ahmet Fevzi Big or Ahmet Fevzi Paşa (Adyghe: Бигь Ахьмэт; 1871–1947) was an Ottoman commander of the Ninth Army Corps of the Ottoman Third Army. He was from the Ubykh "Big" family from Düzce. His father's name was Yakub.

== Career ==
He graduated from the Ottoman Military College in 1913. Two years later, he participated in the Defense of Gallipoli during World War I.

After the war ended and the Ottoman Empire was occupied and partitioned, he joined the forces of Mustafa Kemal and fought in the Turkish War of Independence. After the Kuva-i Inzibatiye forces loyal to the Ottoman Government were defeated by Çerkes Ethem's forces in the Revolt of Ahmet Anzavur, he was sent to recruit Circassians for the nationalist Kuva-yi Milliye. His efforts to persuade Circassians around the South Marmara towns of Manyas and Gönen were largely unsuccessful. He later told Kâzım Özalp that the people of Manyas were waiting for an opportunity to launch a second rebellion.

The XI Corps began the Ottoman Third Army's offensive in the Caucasus Campaign on 7 November. On 12 November they were joined by reinforcements from the IX corps commanded by Fevzi Paşa. Together they were able to push the Russians back.

Behaeddin Shakir was unable to bring the IX Corps under the control Committee of Union and Progress (CUP) while Fevzi Paşa remained their commander. When Fevzi Paşa opposed the Ottoman plan to attack the Russians during the winter, Shakir replaced Fevzi Paşa as corps commander.

Although he was appointed the commander of the XX Corps in place of Ali Fuad Pasha, he refused it at the caution of Rauf Bey and Bekir Sami Bey.

Fevzi Pasha died in 1947 in Istanbul.

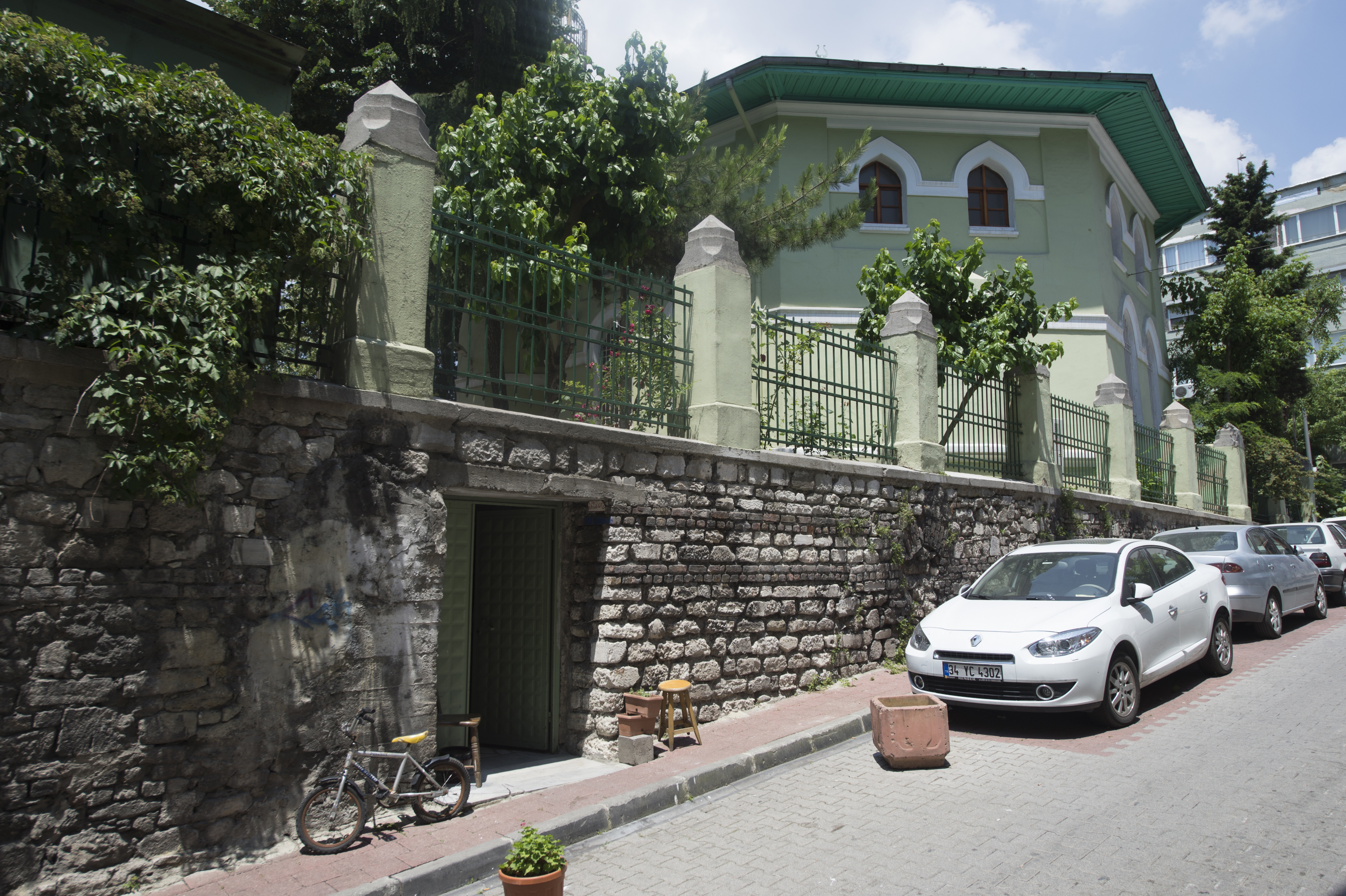
Ahmediye Mosque from side street

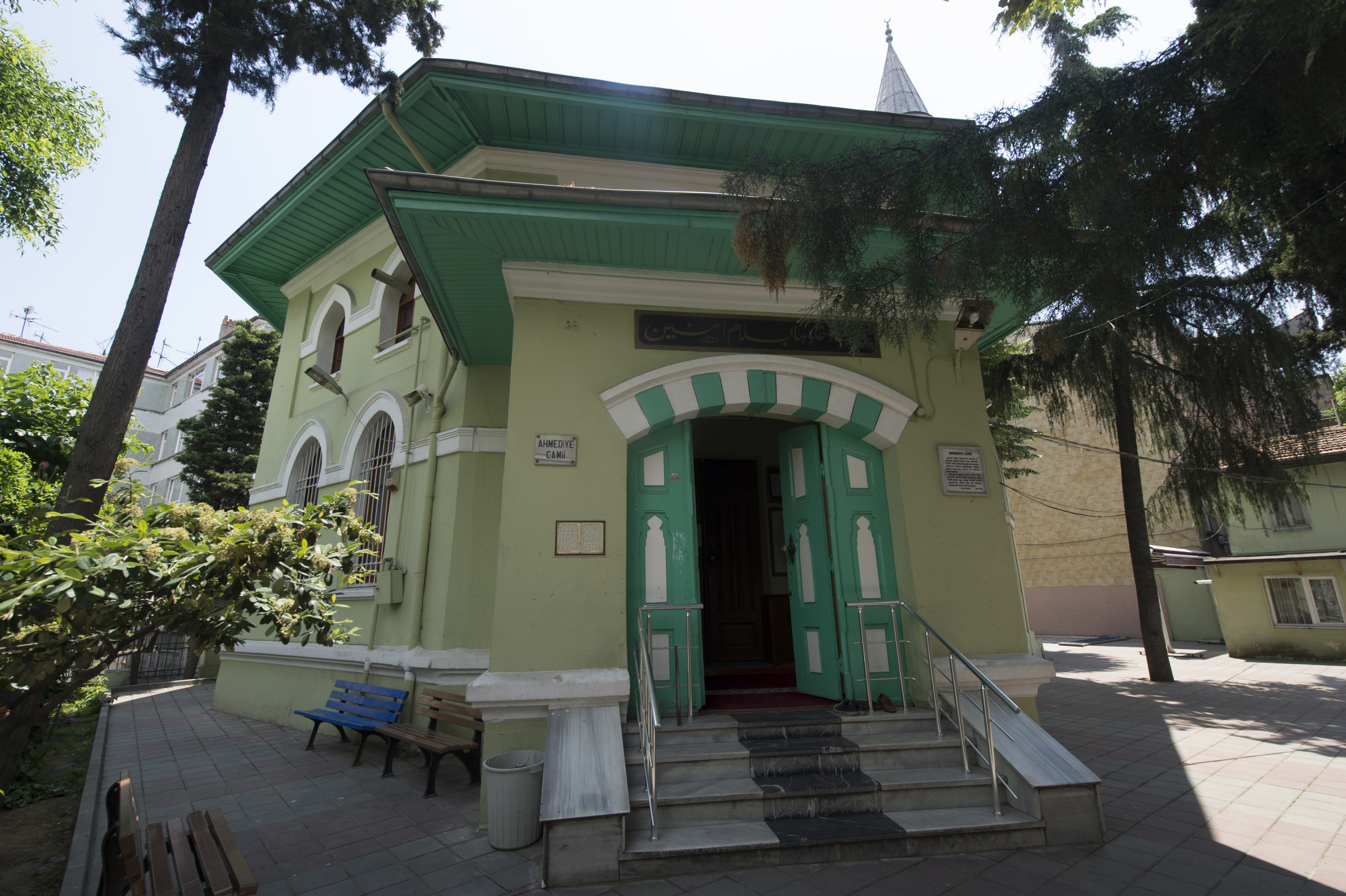
Ahmediye Mosque exterior

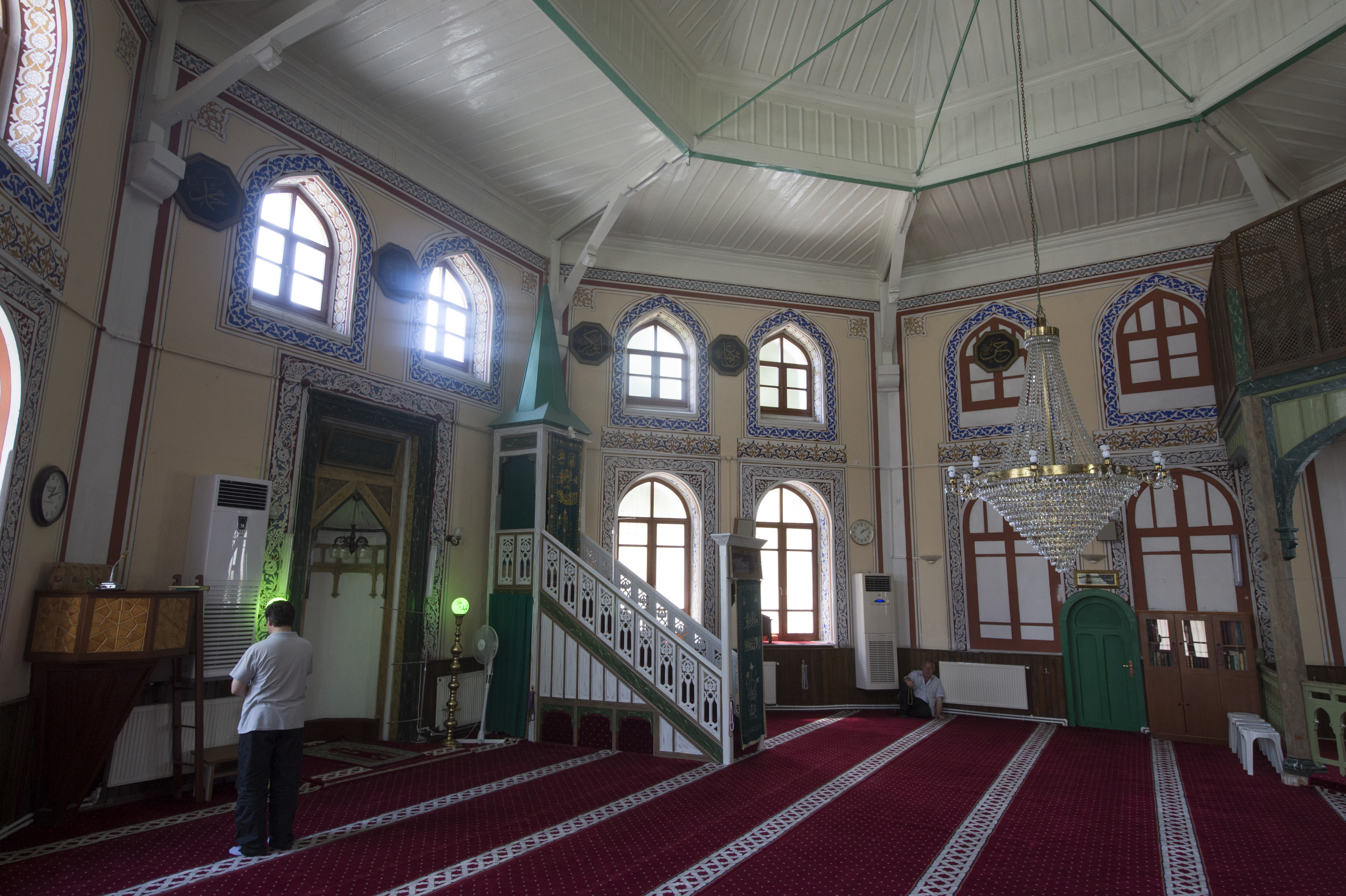
Ahmediye Mosque interior
