= Bergmann Offensive =

First battle of the Caucasus Campaign of WW1

- Part of the Caucasus campaign
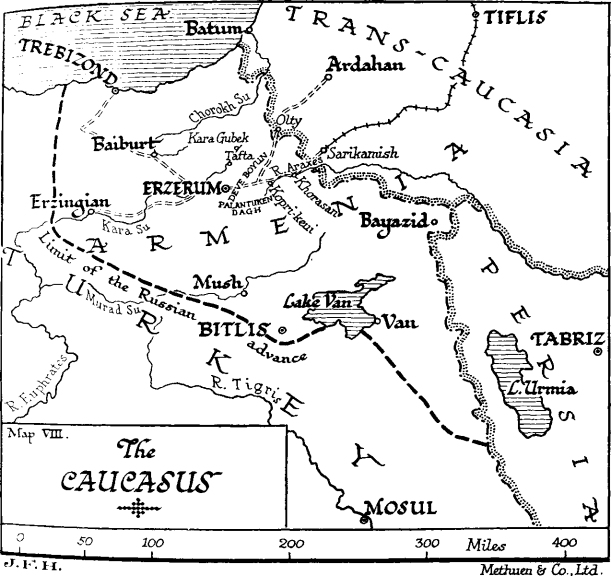
- The limit of the Russian advance into Anatolia during the Caucasus Campaign (1914–1918)
Date	2–21 November 1914
Location	Erzurum Vilayet, Ottoman Empire
Result	Ottoman victory

Belligerents
Ottoman Empire; German Empire	Russian Empire

Commanders and leaders
Enver Pasha; Galip Pasha; Felix Guse; Yusuf İzzet Pasha; Ali İhsan Pasha; Şerif Bey; Arif Bey; Ziya Bey; Behaeddin Shakir; Yakub Cemil	I. Vorontsov-Dashkov; Georgy Bergmann; Nikolai Yudenich; Nikolai Baratov; Nikolai Istomin; Drastamat Kanayan (WIA)

Strength
96,000 or 90,000 & 152 guns: IX Corps (3 division): 50,000 soldiers & 72 guns; XI Corps (3 division): 35,000 soldiers & 60 guns; 37th Division: 5,000 soldiers & 20 guns; Turks had also 40,000 irregular Hamidiye cavalry	75,000 & 168 guns: 1st Caucasian Army Corps (32 battalions): 40-42,000 infantry & 96 guns; 1st Caucasian Cossack Division (30 sotnia) and one odd Cossack regiment (6 sotnia): 4,500 cavalry & 24 guns; 1st Kuban Plastun Brigade (5 battalions): 3,500 infantry; Armenian volunteers (4 druzhina): 4,000 infantry; 2st Kuban Plastun Brigade (6 battalions): 4,000 infantry; General Reserve: 2nd Turkistan Army Corps (21 battalions, 12 sotnia); 17,000 infantry, 1,500 cavalry, 48 guns

Casualties and losses
14,023: 1,983 killed; 6,170 wounded; 3,070 taken prisoner; 2,800 deserted	6,000: 1,000 killed; 4,000 wounded; 1,000 died of frostbite

The Bergmann Offensive (Turkish: Bergmann Taaruzu; in Turkish literature Köprüköy ve Azap Muharebeleri, "Battles of Köprüköy and Azap"; in Russian literature Кёприкейская операция—"Köprüköy operation") was the first engagement of the Caucasus campaign. The first battle after the Russians took Bayazıt during World War I. General Georgy Bergmann, commander of the 1st Caucasus Army Corps, took the initiative against the Ottoman Empire.

When the war started, Russia had 25 battalions at Sarikamish, 8 battalions at Oltu, 5 battalions at Kağızman and 5 battalions at Kars. Russia also had 20 cavalry companies. On the other hand, the Ottomans had XI Corps' 2 divisions (18 Battalions) at Hasankale, IX Corps' 28th and 29th Divisions at Erzurum, IX Corps's 17th Division at İspir, XI Corps' 33rd Division at Tutak, 37th Division (6 battalions) at Muş, X Corps' 30th Division at Sivas, 32nd Division at Samsun and 31st Division at Amasya. X Corps didn't participate in the Bergmann Offensive due to its distance. 29th, 33rd and 37th Divisions joined the battle on 11 November and 17th Division on 17 November. The Ottomans initially had a 33% infantry numerical advantage (the Russian Caucasian Army consisted of 45,000 infantry and the Ottoman army had 60,000 infantry available) and Russia separated their army carelessly. The Ottomans however didn't use this advantage due to their precaution. Russia equalized numbers by starting to bring in the Turkistan Army Corps on 16 November. The Ottomans obtained a 50% infantry advantage by bringing X Corps (40,000 infantry) at the beginning of December. This numerical superiority encouraged the Ottomans to perform the Sarikamish Offensive.

At the outbreak of war, the Russians decided to occupy the Eleşkirt valley as a defensive measure to prevent the incursion of Kurdish Hamidiye units. The Russians considered the Turkish forces to be too weak to mount any offensive before winter weather would make any such offensive impossible, and no other offensive moves were intended by the Russian high command of the Caucasian army – their strategy envisaged an active defense against a locally superior force. However, local Russian commanders had the authority to authorize limited advances.

On 2 November, Bergmann's troops crossed the border in the general direction of Köprüköy. The primary aim was to secure the Eleșkirt valley. On the right flank, 20th Infantry Division under Istomin moved from Oltu in the direction of İd. On the left flank a Cossack division under Baratov moved into the Eleșkirt valley towards Yuzveran, after it crossed the Aras River.

By 5 November Bergmann had completed the objectives expected of him. However, he expanded his mission by ordering further advances into Ottoman territory. By 6 November contact was made between the opposing armies, and heavy fighting continued into the 7th, with temporary Russian successes. Further Russian advances were held in check as a result of heavy fighting between 7 and 10 November. On 11 November Ottoman forces counterattacked and the Russian flanks quickly became at risk, forcing a Russian retreat. By the 12th they had retreated back to the lines they occupied on the 4th, and still at risk of being outflanked, further retreats followed. Only the arrival of Russian reinforcements headed by General Przevalski checked the situation and halted the Russian retreat. On 16–17 November Przevalski crossed the Aras river and at dawn attacked part of the Turkish XI Corps, halting their advance. After two more days the fighting finally petered out.

Russian losses were 1,000 killed and 4,000 wounded, 1,000 men died of exposure(with the Bakinski regiment suffering 40% losses), while the Ottomans lost 1,983 men killed, 6,170 wounded, 3,070 were taken prisoner, and 2,800 deserted. Yudenich and his staff were disappointed by the unsuccessful attack. Turkish forces then crossed the border and, advancing into the lower Choruh valley, destroyed on 15 November a Russian column sent to protect the copper mines at Borçka, forcing the Russians to evacuate Borçka, Artvin and Ardanuç. Turkish success during these first engagements encouraged Enver Pasha in his plan to attack at Sarıkamıș.

Muratoff and Allen describe Bergman as "an officer who liked to imitate in appearance and manner the type of the old Caucasian hero-leaders", but who had "none of the qualities which are necessary as a commander; he had no experience of field operations, and was merely blindly obstinate when he thought to show strength of character".

== Strength of forces ==
Turkish 3rd Army in October
Unit	Men	(Pack) Animal	Rifle	Mitrailleuse	Gun
9th Corps	71,474	17,865	42,456	24	72
10th Corps	63,700	16,197	35,326	20	56
11th Corps	49,017	12,147	24,251	16	60
13th Corps	9,590	3,546	7,075	4	20
Total	193,781	49,755	109,108	64	208
Erzurum Fortress	32,769	1,710	2,947	0	323

Turks had 227 thousand men (At the time, Turk Army tend to have available soldiers 70% of sum (160,000) approximately) on paper but Turk lost huge number of their troops due to illness, frostbite and desertion before reaching battlefield. 34th Division of 11th Corps had initially 12,000 men but Commander of 34th Division Ali İhsan Pasha could bring only 8,000 men. 33rd Division (initial number isn't mentioned in sources but it is close to 34th Division) decreased to 3,000 soldiers. At the beginning of the Battle of Sarikamish, Turkish forces was 90,000 soldiers. 40,000 soldiers came from 10th Corps. 9th Corps was 28,000 and 11th Corps 22,000 soldier. 13th Corps came from Baghdad and it could bring only 2,000 soldiers. 37th Division was sent to Bayazit against Oganovski's forces. Considering Turkish losses was 11,800 in Bergmann Offensive, We can estimate that Turkish Army was 62,000 soldiers in Bergmann Offensive. As for Russian side, Muratoff and Allen gave vague numbers. They said that "at an average of 1000 men per battalion, Caucasian Army amounted to about 100,000 infantry, 15,000 cavalry (117 sotni) and 256 guns". Muratoff and Allen also said that Plastun (3 Plastun Brigade: 18 battalion) and Turkistan battalions (21 Battalions) was rarely above 800 men and 39th and 20th (16 battalions both) infantry division, after mobilization, became 25-30% above normal strength. Amount of normal strength isn't mentioned but it is probably 1000 men. In Bergmann Offensive, initially Russian had 39th, 20th Divisions (40,000-42,000 infantry), 5 Battalions of 1st Plastun Brigade (3,500 infantry) and 36 sotni (4,000 cavalry) and 120 guns. On the 15th, 4th Turkistan Rifle Brigade arrived. Strength of 4th Turkistan Rifle Brigade isn't mentioned by Muratoff and Allen but it constituted half of the Turkistan Army Corps (21 battalions, 42 guns).

In conclusion, Russians started battle with 45,000 infantry, 4,000 cavalry and 120 guns. They gained 7–8,000 strong reinforcement on 15 November. On the other hand, Turkish 17th Division caught Battle on 17 November. Consequently, both side had approximately 50,000 soldiers with equal gunpower (120 Russian guns against 128 Turkish guns).

== From Turkish Side ==
On 1 November, Russians crossed the border and started the move on Erzurum. The Ottoman frontier guards couldn't detect the power of the Russian forces because they were killed, routed or captured abruptly by Russians. 3rd Army commander Hasan İzzet Pasha assumed that a Russian offensive with superior forces had started. He ordered XI Corps to retreat Erzurum without learning the magnitude of the Russian army. XI Corps retreated hastily to Erzurum in two days. Hasan İzzet Pasha sent 2nd Cavalry Division (1300 swords) to reconnoitre. On 4 November, Cavalry Division's commander lieutenant colonel Yusuf İzzet fought against Russian troops successfully in Köprüköy village. On the same day, Enver Pasha recommended Hasan İzzet to attack and annihilate separately moving Russian troops. Because of this, Hasan İzzet Pasha underestimated the Russians and sent back XI Corps in a similar hurry. On 6 November, Cavalry Division again battled Russian troops in Köprüköy and retreated. It was observed the Russians as 8 infantry battalions and one cavalry regiment.

Hasan İzzet planned to rout this vanguard force and retreat again to the Erzurum fortifications. 7 November was a rainy and foggy day. Two divisions of XI Corps moved from Hasankale. The Russians were supposed to be east of Köprüköy, but they came to Badicivan village 10 kilometers northwest of Köprüköy. One regiment of XI Corps fell into heavy Russian rifle and artillery fire. This regiment started to escape disorderly and panic passed to other Ottoman troops. All XI Corps ran off to Hasankale. Ottoman officers regrouped XI Corps before long and sent back them to the Russians, but in this day, the Ottomans couldn't make any progress. On the second day the Ottomans forced the Russians to retreat from their forward trenches. After the Ottoman victory of 8 November, Hasan İzzet's German chief of staff, Lieutenant Colonel Felix Guse, said to Hasan İzzet: "The best retreat is retreat after gaining success. We have been successful... If Russia attacks us with superior forces, it will be hard to hold in these trenches and retreat to Erzurum". Hasan İzzet accepted Guse's proposal and ordered to write a retreat decree. XI Corps commander Galip Pasha said "I will resign if this decree applies. There is no reason for retreat. This decision demoralizes our soldiers". This decree was cancelled and the next day more positions were captured. Battles continued until 21 November. In the following days, The Ottomans tried to encircle the Russians with 29th Division in the north and 33rd Division in the south. On 17 November, 33rd Division was just 3,000 soldiers strong, and was defeated by Przevalski's superior forces. 29th Division coincided inconvenient terrain; accordingly, they were stopped easily by the Russians. Also 29th Division didn't move away much from its main army. In fact, Hasan İzzet make encirclement on paper for convincing Enver.

=== Willing Retreat ===
On 21 November, the Ottomans regained 30 kilometers but Hasan İzzet decide to retreat 15 kilometers as he had received exaggerated information about Russian troops toward Narman. He withdrew all armies on the night of 21 November. A terrible blizzard showed up. Hundreds of soldiers died from hypothermia and presence of Ottoman troops decreased by 50%. Russia didn't anticipate the Ottomans would retreat, because the Ottomans had successfully fought for 2 weeks. Ziya Yergök said: "If Russia would make use of this retreat, they could capture all our army with just one cavalry division". IX Corps commander Ahmet Fevzi Pasha criticized Hasan İzzet for this unnecessary retreat. Hasan İzzet Pasha wanted approval from Enver Pasha to dismiss of Ahmet Fevzi Pasha by making the argument that "Although he is commanding one of the most privileged Corps of 3rd Army, he is pessimistic about the result of the war". Enver Pasha gave the approval and Ahmet Fevzi Pasha was both dismissed and retired. 34th Division commander Ali İhsan Pasha was appointed IX Corps commander by Hasan İzzet Pasha. This retreat caused intrigue against Hasan İzzet Pasha. Enver Pasha wanted to see the situation on the scene. The council of ministers suggested that he should stay in Istanbul and send a proxy in his place, as he was minister of war and vice-generalissimo. Enver Pasha sent second chief of staff Hafiz Hakki Pasha instead of himself, but a few days later he also went to the Ottoman 3rd Army. This arrivals led to Sarikamish outflanking manoeuvre and pitched battle.
