= Georgy Bergmann =

Russian soldier (1854-1929)

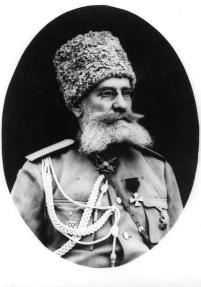
- Born: April 3, 1854; Kurakh, Dagestan, Caucasian Imamate
- Died: February 2, 1929 (aged 74); Marseille, Bouches-du-Rhône, France
- Burial place: Russian Orthodox Cemetery, Nice, France
- Military career
- Allegiance: Russian Empire; Russian Republic
- Branch: Imperial Russian Army; White Army
- Rank: General of the Infantry
- Commands: 24th Army Corps; 2nd Caucasus Army Corps; 1st Caucasus Army Corps
- Conflicts: Russo-Turkish War; World War I; Bergmann Offensive; Russian Civil War

Georgy Eduardovich Bergmann (Russian: Гео́ргий Эдуа́рдович Бе́рхман; 3 April 1854 – 2 February 1929) was a Russian General of the Infantry who was known for organizing the Bergmann Offensive against the Ottoman Empire during the First World War. He was also a commander of the White Army during the Russian Civil War.

== Early years ==
From a noble Baltic-German family in the Governorate of Livonia, Bergmann was born in the village of Kurakh, Dagestan Oblast. He received his general education at the 2nd Moscow Military Gymnasium.

He entered the service as a cadet at the Pavel Military School on August 9, 1873. After graduating from college in 1876, with the rank of ensign, he was sent to the Caucasus in the 21st artillery brigade. He then participated in the Russo-Turkish War of 1877-1878. In 1881 he graduated from the General Staff Academy.

== Service of the Caucasus ==
From 1881 to 1887, Bergmann was senior adjutant of the headquarters of the 21st Infantry Division. On March 19, 1888, he was appointed senior adjutant of the mobilization department of the headquarters of the Caucasian Military District. In 1892 he was promoted to colonel "for distinction in service".

- From June 7, 1893, to April 7, 1898 - the commander of the Lori reserve regiment.
- From April 7, 1898, to November 28, 1899 - the commander of the 257th infantry reserve Poti regiment.
- From November 28, 1899, to November 27, - 1902 the commander of the 81st infantry regiment of Absheron.
- On November 27, 1902 "for distinction in service" he was promoted to major general and appointed chief of staff of the 2nd Caucasian Army Corps.

The main service took place at the General Staff in the Caucasus Military District, and from January 31, 1907, to January 29, 1913, he was the chief of staff of the district.

=== Service in the Kazan military district ===
On January 29, 1913, he was transferred to the Kazan Military District and appointed commander of the 24th Army Corps. On April 14, 1913 "for distinction in service" he was promoted to general from infantry.

== World War I ==
On January 2, 1914, he was appointed commander of the 2nd Caucasian Army Corps, with which he entered the war.

From December 11, 1914, to February 4, 1915, Bergmann was commander of the 1st Caucasus Army Corps. On February 4, 1915, he was appointed at the disposal of the Commander-in-Chief of the Caucasian Army. As the head of the Sarykamysh group of forces, he won a brilliant victory over the Turkish army in the Battle of Sarikamish, for which on July 26, 1916, he was awarded the Order of St. George, 4th degree. It is worth noting that he received the order some time later, since initially the victory was attributed to Lieutenant General Nikolai Yudenich, chief of the field headquarters of the Caucasian army. From November 13, 1916, to April 5, 1917, Bergmann was commander of the 40th Army Corps on the Southwestern and Romanian Fronts.

He was a member of the Volunteer Army, with which he went to Constantinople, then to Bulgaria, then moved to Marseille, where he headed a branch of the Russian All-Military Union.

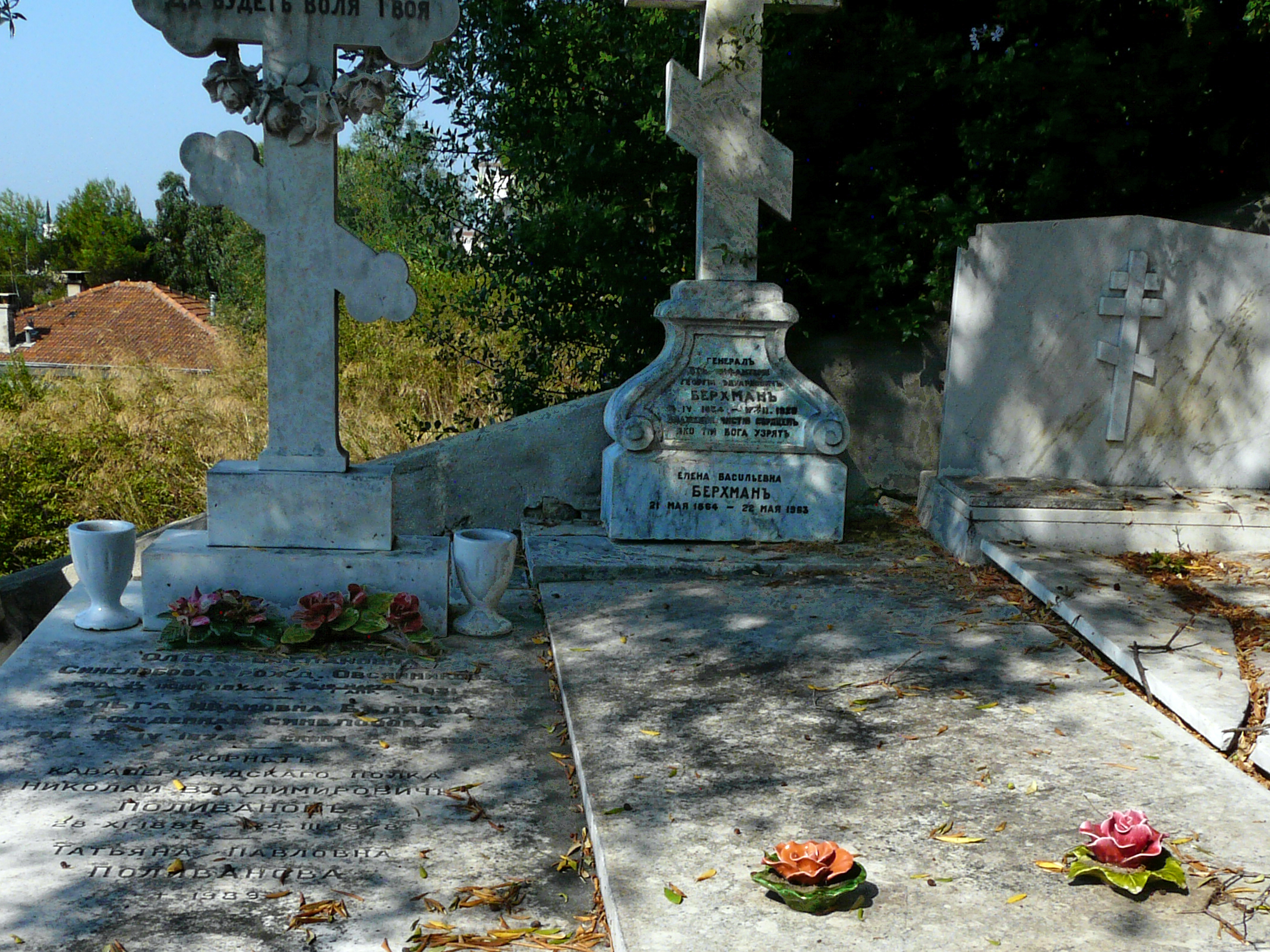
The grave of Georgy Eduardovich Berkhman and his wife Elena Vasilievna at the Kokad Russian cemetery in Nice

He died on February 2, 1929. His ashes were transferred to the Russian Orthodox Cemetery, Nice on March 9, 1930.

== Family ==
- Wife - Elena Vasilievna (1864-1963), daughter of General Vasily Potto.
- Children: Elena, George, Natalia, Maria, Veronica (married Dolittle), Irina.

== Awards ==
- Order of St. Anna, 4th degree (1878)
- Order of St. Stanislaus, 3rd class with swords and bow (1878)
- Order of St. Anna, 3rd class with swords and bow (1878)
- Order of St. Stanislaus, 2nd degree (1884)
- Order of St. Anna 2nd degree (1888)
- Order of St. Vladimir, 4th degree (1895)
- Order of St. Vladimir 3rd degree (1900)
- Order of St. Stanislaus 1st degree (1904)
- Order of St. Anna, 1st degree (1906)
- Order of St. Vladimir, 2nd degree (September 5, 1909)
- Order of the White Eagle, (December 6, 1912)
- Order of St. Alexander Nevsky with Swords (July 7, 1915)
- Order of Saint George 4th degree (July 26, 1916)

=== Foreign Awards ===
- Qajar Iran: Order of the Lion and the Sun, 1st Degree
- Qajar Iran: Persian Order of the Lion and the Sun, 2nd degree
- Kingdom of Romania: Order of the Star of Romania with swords (1917)

== Bibliography ==
- Rutych NN Biographical reference book of the highest ranks of the Volunteer Army and the Armed Forces of the South of Russia: Materials for the history of the White movement. - M., 2002
- Zalessky K.A. Who was who in the First World War. - M., 2003
- "Georgy Bergmann" (in Russian). «Russian army in a Great war» project.
- Berkhman's biography
- Berkhman, Georgy Eduardovich (2007). Great Russian Biographical Encyclopedia (electronic edition) (Version 3.0 ed.). M.: Businessoft, IDDK.
- Berkhman Georgy Eduardovich
- Korsun N.G.Sarykamysh operation - M .: Military Publishing House of the NKO of the USSR, 1937 .-- 164 p.
- Sarykamysh operation, 12-24 December 1914: some documents
