= Nikolai Istomin =

Russian Lieutenant General

Nikolay Mikhailovich Istomin
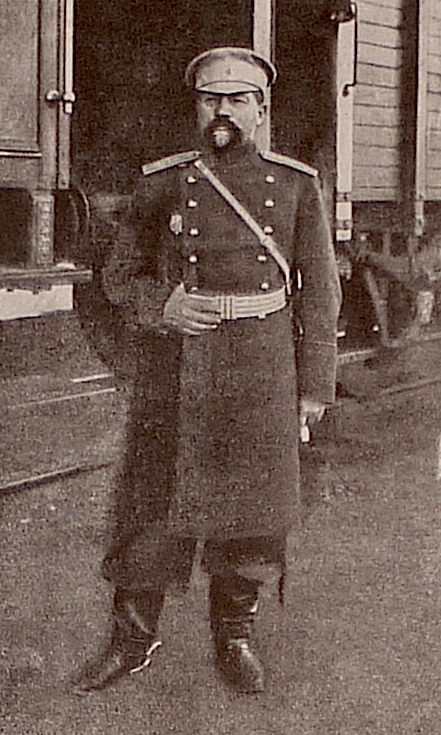
- Colonel N.M. Istomin, 1904
- Born: May 21, 1855; Pyatnitskoe, Oryol Governorate, Russian Empire
- Died: Unknown, likely after 1925
- Military career
- Allegiance: Russian Empire; Soviet Russia
- Branch: Imperial Russian Army; Red Army
- Service years: 1868 — 1923
- Rank: Lieutenant General
- Commands: Nezhinsky 137th Infantry Regiment; 5th Caucasian Army Corps
- Conflicts: Russo-Turkish War; Siege of Plevna; Russo-Japanese War; World War I; Bergmann Offensive; Battle of Sarikamish; Battle of Ardahan; Russian Civil War

Nikolai Mikhailovich Istomin was a Russian Lieutenant General who was known for being the commander of the 5th Caucasian Army Corps during World War I.

== Biography ==
Istomin was Born on May 21, 1855, in Pyatnitskoe.

On September 7, 1868, he entered the Baltic Navigation School, from which he was released as an Ensign on August 30, 1873, in the 5th naval crew, but did not stay long in the navy and was transferred to the army and served in the 3rd artillery brigade.

During the Russo-Turkish War, Istomin was part of the Lovche-Selva detachment and fought at the Siege of Plevna. He then made a difficult winter crossing over the Trayanov Pass for the Balkans. For the difference in this campaign, on December 18, 1878, he was promoted to second lieutenant.

Produced on December 20, 1879, as a lieutenant, Istomin passed the entrance exams to the General Staff Academy, which he graduated in 1883 with the 2nd grade. He was at the headquarters of the Kiev military district. From November 29, 1883, he served as senior adjutant of the headquarters of the 12th Infantry Division, on April 8, 1884, he was promoted to staff captain and on March 29, 1885, to captain. Istomin served the census command of the company from December 1, 1885, to November 4, 1886, in the 48th Odessa Infantry Regiment.

Istomin was then promoted to lieutenant colonel on August 30, 1890, was then appointed a headquarters officer under the command of the head of the 2nd local brigade, and from February 10, 1894, he was a head officer under the command of the 55th infantry reserve brigade. On August 30, 1894, he was promoted to colonel; he served the qualifying command of the battalion from April 30 to September 10, 1894, in the 7th Samogit Grenadier Regiment.

On October 8, 1901, Istomin was appointed commander of the Nezhinsky 137th Infantry Regiment, at the head of which he took part in the Russo-Japanese War but was wounded during the fighting. On November 7, 1904, he was promoted to major general for distinction and was appointed commander of the 2nd brigade of the 1st Siberian infantry division, at the same time he served as chief of the garrison of the Telinsky fortified region, chief of the garrison of the Gongzhou region; then he was temporary acting chief of military communications under the Commander-in-Chief in the Far East. From July 28, 1905, he served as head of the stage department of military communications under the Commander-in-Chief in the Far East. For distinction against the Japanese, Istomin was awarded the Golden Weapon for Bravery on June 5, 1907, and the orders of St. Vladimir, 3rd degree with swords on December 6, 1904, and St. Stanislav, 1st degree with swords (in 1905).

Upon his return to Russia, Istomin was appointed chief of staff of the 4th Army Corps on February 16, 1906. On May 1, 1913, he was promoted to lieutenant general and appointed chief of the 20th Infantry Division in the Caucasus.

In 1914, Istomin operated on the Caucasian front of the First World War, simultaneously with the division he commanded the Oltinsky detachment, at the head of which he participated in the Koprikey and Sarykamysh operations. By the highest order of May 17, 1915, Istomin was awarded the Order of St. George 4th degree.

From March 15, 1915, he was the commander of the 5th Caucasian Army Corps, which fought in the European theater of war. In March 1916, this corps was transferred to the Caucasus, and Istomin was left to fight in the Western Front and on April 2 was appointed commander of the newly formed 46th Army Corps.

After the February Revolution, during the purge of the senior command staff, Istomin was removed from his post on April 6, 1917, and enlisted in the reserve of ranks at the headquarters of the Minsk Military District. On October 23, he was dismissed from service on a petition with a uniform and a pension. After the October Revolution, Istomin remained in Petrograd and enlisted in the Red Army and in 1925 he was a teacher at the Naval Hydrographic School in Leningrad. The date of Istomin's death remains unknown.

== Awards ==
- Order of Saint Stanislaus, 3rd Class (1880)
- Order of Saint Anna, 3rd Class (1885)
- Order of Saint Stanislaus, 2nd Class (1888)
- Order of Saint Anna, 2nd Class (1898)
- Order of Saint Vladimir, 4th Class (1903)
- Order of Saint Vladimir 3rd class with swords (December 6, 1904)
- Order of Saint Stanislaus 1st class with swords (1905)
- Golden Weapon for Bravery (June 5, 1907)
- Order of Saint Anna, 1st Class (December 6, 1910)
- Order of Saint George, 4th Class (May 17, 1915)
