= Ziya Yergök =

Ottoman and Turkish Brigadier General

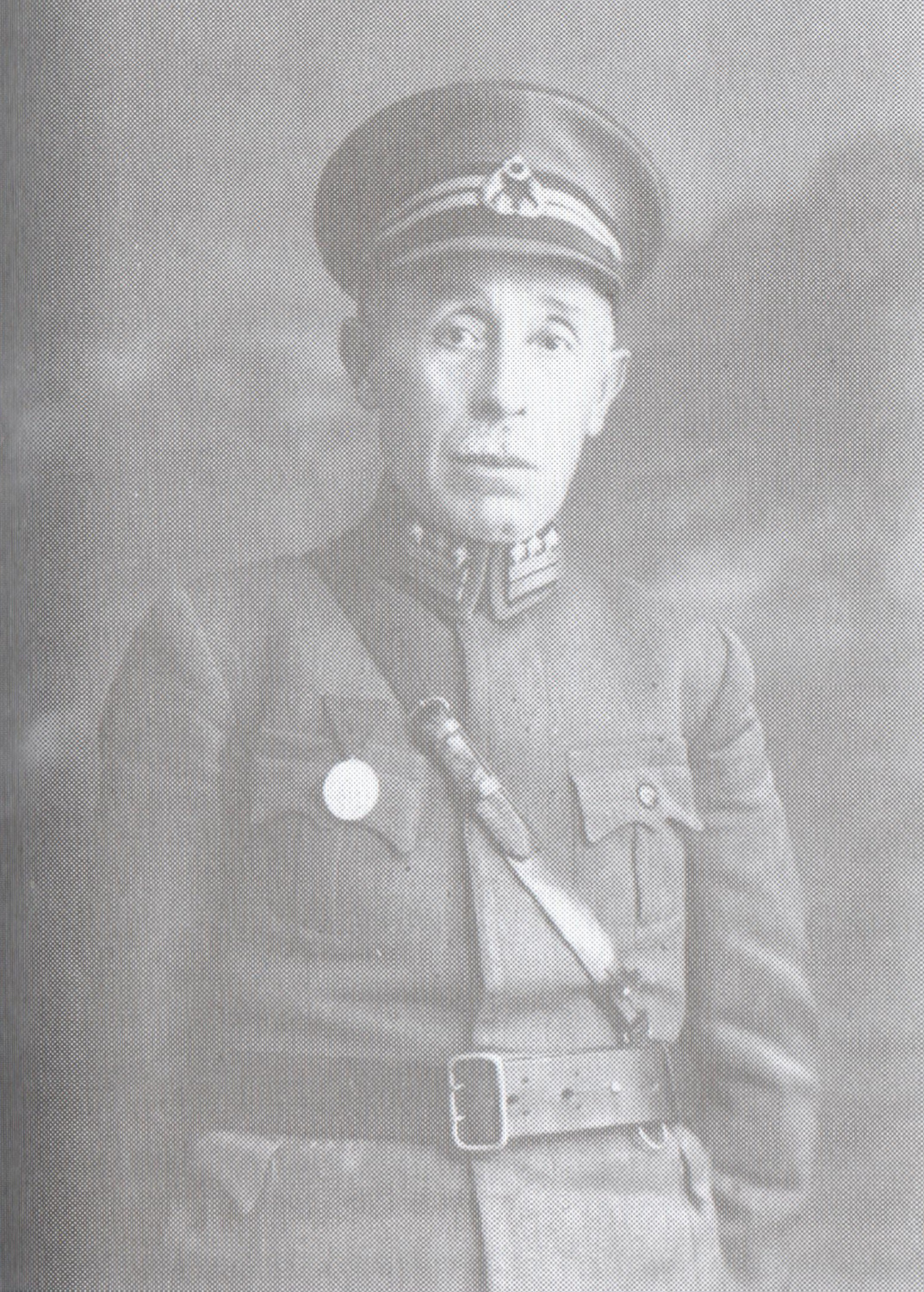
- Born: 1873; Aşağımaden, Trebizond Vilayet, Ottoman Empire
- Died: June 1, 1949 (aged 75–76); Istanbul, Turkey
- Military career
- Allegiance: Ottoman Empire; Turkey
- Branch: Ottoman Army; Turkish Armed Forces
- Service years: 1902 — 1931; 1941 — 1943
- Rank: Brigadier General
- Conflicts: First Balkan War; Second Balkan War; World War I; Bergmann Offensive; Battle of Sarikamish; Turkish War of Independence
- Awards: Order of the Medjidie; Order of Osmanieh; Imtiaz Medal; Liakat Medal; Medal of Independence

Ziya Yergök (Formerly known as Ziya Bey) was an Ottoman and Turkish Brigadier General who was notable for his service in the First World War and the Turkish War of Independence.

== Biography ==
He was born in 1873 in Aşağımaden. His father was Ahmet Usta, nicknamed Çito, and his mother is Esma Hanım. He moved to Erzurum with his family when he was 6 years old. He lived a poor and half-starved childhood and was orphaned at the age of 12. He transferred to the military high school in Erzurum and attended the Ottoman Military Academy.

He was promoted to the rank of kolağası in 1909 and was appointed to the 7th Division in Erzurum. In 1914, he was appointed to the 83rd Regiment. He participated in the suppression of the Bitlis uprising in 1907 against Kurdish rebels. During the First World War, he commanded his troops in the Bergmann Offensive and the Battle of Sarikamish. He was first wounded in the Sarıkamış Operation, and then he was captured after the success of the Russian counterattack. He first stayed in Semipalatinsk, then to the Krasnoyarsk prison camp. He managed to escape from the prison camp in 1920 and returned to Turkey after 6 years of captivity through East Turkestan and Central Asia. When he returned, he immediately joined the Turkish War of Independence.

When he returned to Turkey, he served in Kâzım Karabekir's Eastern Army during the Turkish–Armenian War. After the war, he was awarded the Red Stripe of the Medal of Independence. In 1926 he was reassigned to the west. He was appointed to Afyon as the Chairman of the 1st Corps Court of War. He was promoted to the rank of Mirliva on 30 August 1930 and became a Pasha. He retired in 1931.

He was called to duty again in 1939 as part of the Turkish mobilization declared with the start of World War II and became the commander of the Istanbul Military District. In 1942, he was appointed to the Presidency of the Istanbul No. 2 Martial Law Court. He retired from the age limit for the second time on 14 July 1943. He died on June 1, 1949.

II. He was called to duty again in 1939 as part of the mobilization declared with the start of World War II and became the commander of the Istanbul Military District. In 1942, he was appointed to the Presidency of the Istanbul No. 2 Martial Law Court. He retired from the age limit for the second time on 14 July 1943. He died on June 1, 1949.

== Memoirs ==
Yergök wrote all his memoirs from the first years of his military service with 1,800 pages that holds these memories, author Sami Önal published A Question from Dersim and the Sarikamish Captivity as adaptations of Yergök's memoirs.

Covering his memories of the turbulent period before World War I, it covers his memories from Harbiye to Dersim, starting from the years when he was a colleague with Enver Pasha in Harbiye, to the 31 March Incident and the Dersim rebellion.

In the book titled From Sarıkamış to Captivity gave information on Ziya Yergök's appointment to the 83rd Regiment Command, his capture by the Russians during the Sarıkamış Operation, his memories and observations in cities from Central Asia, East Turkestan, Siberia and Azerbaijan, where he passed while escaping from the Krasnoyarsk prison camp.
