= Battle of Ardahan =

1914–1915 battle between the Russian Empire and the Ottoman Empire

Coordinates: 41°3′N 42°42′E

- Part of Caucasus campaign of Middle Eastern theatre in World War I
Date	25 December 1914 – 18 January 1915
Location	Ardahan, Kars Oblast, Russian Empire
Result	Russian victory

Belligerents
Russian Empire: Assyrian volunteers	Ottoman Empire

Commanders and leaders
Nikolai Istomin; Illarion Vorontsov-Dashkov	(Ottoman Empire) (German Empire) Lt. Col. August Stange Bey

Casualties and losses
Unknown	22 December only: 2,000 dead 1,027 captured 400 massacred

The Battle of Ardahan (Turkish: Ardahan Harekâtı; Russian: Битва при Ардагане, Armenian: Արդահանի ճակատամարտ) was fought between 25 December 1914 and 18 January 1915 and was an Ottoman military operation commanded by German Lt. Col. Stange to capture the city of Ardahan and cut the Russian link to Sarikamish–Kars line, supporting the Battle of Sarikamish. By 3 January 1915, Vorontsov-Dashkov achieved a decisive victory over the Ottoman forces at Ardahan.

== Background ==
Ardahan was one of the eastern Ottoman provinces that had come under Russian rule in 1878. Armenian separatist ambitions proved to be just as unacceptable to the Russians as they had been to the Turks, but the Russians successfully overcame doctrinal differences between the Armenian and Russian churches to forge a common Christian identity in a bid to ignite a Christian uprising against the Muslim Turks. However, fearing reprisals against Armenian civilians, not all Armenians joined the Russian war effort.

As the situation quickly escalated, Enver Pasha sought to outflank the Russian forces to seize Sarıkamış and cut off Russian access to railway lines. From Sarıkamış, Turkish forces would proceed to retake Kars, Batum and Ardahan. Enver planned to deploy the X Corps north to Ardahan, while the IX Corps proceeded to Sarıkamış. On the day of battle, 22 December, a terrible snowstorm struck. The Ottoman Third Army lacked proper supplies for these conditions, and incurring heavy losses retreated under Russian fire.

The operation was part of what the Russian Empire viewed the Caucasus front. It was a secondary to the Eastern front. Russia had taken the fortress of Kars from the Turks during the Russo-Turkish War in 1877 and feared a campaign into the Caucasus, aimed at retaking Kars and the port of Batum.

Ottoman generalship and organization were negligible compared to the Allies. Enver hoped a success would facilitate opening the route to Tbilisi and beyond, with a revolt of Caucasian Muslims; another strategic goal was to cut Russian access to hydrocarbon resources around the Caspian Sea. This long-term goal made Britain wary; the Anglo-Persian Oil Company was in the proposed path.

On 30 October 1914, the 3rd Army headquarters was informed by High Command in Istanbul about an exchange of fire during the pursuit of Goeben and Breslau in the Black Sea. High Command expected the Russian Army to cross the Ottoman border at any time. The Bergmann Offensive (2 November 1914 – 16 November 1914) ended with the defeat of Russian troops. The Russian success was along the southern shoulders of the offense where Armenian volunteers visible (effective) and taken Karaköse and Doğubeyazıt. Hasan İzzet Pasha managed to stabilize the front by letting the Russians 25 kilometers inside the Ottoman Empire along the Erzurum-Sarikamish axis.

== Prelude ==
Hostility against Ottoman Armenian soldiers was nearing a breaking point in the Ottoman ranks. Turks blamed Armenians for defecting and supplying Russians with intelligence on Ottoman positions. Actively recruited by Armenian volunteer forces fighting alongside the Russians, and regarded with suspicion among Ottoman forces, there were reports that in each battalion at least three to five Armenians were shot each day.

The "Stange Bey Detachment" left Istanbul on the battleship Yavuz. Two battalions under the command of Christian August Stange disembarked in Rize on 10 December 1914. The detachment was then reinforced with nearly two thousand Kurdish volunteers and materially assisted by the rebellious Adjarians of the country. Behaeddin Shakir and the Teşkilât-ı Mahsusa (the predecessor of the MIT of Turkey), were given the task to raise volunteers among the population in the region.

It had been the original intention that this army should strike at Batum when it was in sufficient force by additions from oversea, but as the result of Russian resistance on land, and especially of various actions between the Ottoman and Russian Fleets, which ended in the latter gaining the control of the Black Sea, the idea was rendered impracticable and was abandoned.

Enver Pasha developed his plans for Battle of Sarikamish. The Stange Bey unit and its supports were fitted to his plan as a secondary force. They were to cut the support for Russian forces at Sarikamish-Kars. The Stange Bey Detachment conduct highly visible operations to distract and pin Russian units. In his plan, Stange Bey operated in the Chorok region and seized the road.

== Battle ==
On 15 December 1914, Stange Bey occupied Ardanuch. On 27 December 1914, after a desperate Russian resistance lasting seventeen days, Stange Bey's Army took Ardahan, and threatened an immediate descent on Kars, which if it succeeded would cut off the retreat of the Russians west of it, that is, at Sarikamish, from Kars.

The Russian Viceroy and his military advisers had grasped the situation. The Stange Bay made that Russians informed very dearly for every foot of their advance. The Russian diversion to Stange Bay unit meant to be a support element to operations to capture Sarikamish and Kars. Russians needed to be strongly reinforced. At this moment, In December 1914, General Nikolai Istomin ordered withdrawal from major Russian units at the Persian Campaign at the height of the Battle of Sarikamish. Persia was denuded of Russian soldiers, and large bodies of troops were hurried forward to the front by rail from Kars, Erivan, and Julfa—almost, but not quite, too late. They would have been altogether too late if the 1st Army Corps had been able to make its contemplated descent on Kars, and the first concern of the Viceroy had been to send supports to the gallant regiment which alone had so long withstood the attack of the two divisions of this Corps before and at Ardahan.

Yet larger reinforcements were dispatched to Sarikamish, and they arrived to find that though the place had been reft from Russian hands the battle was being waged with no less determined persistence and tenacity by their compatriots. Neither at Ardahan nor at Sarikamish were the Russians, even in the closing stages.

Hardly any information regarding the battle of Ardahan can be obtained beyond statements that after the place was bombarded, the Russians drove the Stange Bey Detachment group out. Russian accounts state "by repeated charges utterly routed the enemy, who was crushed into fragments". Under the Russian Pressure the Kurdish Tribe volunteers separated from the Stange Bey Unit. These broken remnants fled in confusion back to Ardanuch, but, hotly pursued, were not allowed to rest there long, as it was reoccupied by the victors on 18 January 1915, some survivors from the Battle made good their escape into their own territory. The others sought refuge in the fastnesses of the Chorok ranges, where the Adjarians gave them shelter. This was the original unit established in Istanbul. Stenge Bey reestablished this unit.

On 1 March 1915 The "Stange Bey Detachment" without volunteer support went back to its initial line, the "Stange Bey Detachment" managed to resist the Russians for more than two months in the region.

== Force ==
The name of the force in western sources passes as the "I Army Corps", Turkish sources name it as Stange Bey (or Stanke Bey) detachment. The detachment was given to the command of the German Major Stange and became known as "Stange Bey Detachment". The size of the force is also in dispute. Western sources claim it had from 30,000 to 35,000 combatants; the precise figure is uncertain.

The left wing which made up of This detachment unit, known as Stanke Bey, consisted of two battalions of the 8th Infantry Regiment and two artillery batteries. It was brought at the outset of the war from Constantinople and landed at Kopa and other ports on the Black Sea south of Batum, and supplemented by many irregulars in the district of the Choruk (northeast of Erzerum), where its concentration was effected.

== Aftermath ==
The battle was the subject of a Lubok popular print.

== Bibliography ==
- Erickson, Edward J. (2001). Ordered to Die: A History of the Ottoman Army in the First World War. Greenwood Publishing Group. ISBN 978-0-313-31516-9.
