= 1st Caucasus Rifle Regiment =

- Кавказский 1-й стрелковый полк
- Active: July 10th 1837 – March 16th 1918
- Disbanded: March 16th 1918
- Country: Russian Empire
- Allegiance: Imperial Russian Army; Russian Army (1917)
- Branch: Army
- Garrison/HQ: Tbilisi
- Engagements: Caucasian War; [{Siege of Kars]]; Crimean War; World War I

The 1st Caucasian Rifle Regiment (Russian: Кавказский 1-й стрелковый полк) was a regiment in the Imperial Russian Army.

== History ==
Formed in Helsinki on 10 July 1837, it was first known as the 1st Rifle Battalion. The battalion was then sent to the Caucasus and was renamed into the Caucasian Rifle Battalion. The battalion was sent to fight in the Caucasian War in 1845, where they fought in the Siege of Kars. On 6 December 1856 it was renamed into the Caucasian Grenadier Rifle Battalion.

=== World War I ===
The regiment was then deployed on the Caucuses frontier of World War I. The regiment was disbanded on March 16, 1918, along with other units of the 1st Caucasian Rifle Division.

== Organization ==
The 1st Caucasian Rifle Regiment is a part of the 1st Caucasian Rifle Brigade in the 1st Caucasus Army Corps.

== Commanders ==
- 25 July 1837 – 25 May 1843 — Major (from 21 May 1840, Lieutenant Colonel) Yustiny Ivanovich Tüneberg
- 10 June 1843 – 1 November 1843 — Acting Commander, Major Timofey Filippovich Erenkreits
- 4 August 1843 – 13 January 1846 — Lieutenant Colonel Pavel Petrovich Kinovich
- 13 January 1846 – 8 May 1848 — Lieutenant Colonel Anton Fyodorovich Krivonosov
- 8 May 1848 – 30 August 1848 — Acting Commander, Major Arapratsky
- 24 June 1848 – 2 April 1853 — Major (later Lieutenant Colonel) Fyodor Grigoryevich Prezhevsky
- 2 April 1853 – 17 September 1855 — Major (from 19 November 1853, Lieutenant Colonel; from 3 March 1854, Colonel) Konstantin Kharitonovich Luzanov
- 15 October 1855 – 22 July 1861 — Colonel Alexander Vasilyevich Freigang
- 29 July 1861 – 12 December 1863 — Colonel Alexander Karlovich Viberg
- 21 December 1863 – 6 March 1868 — Lieutenant Colonel (from 1 September 1865, Colonel) Konstantin Vissarionovich Komarov
- 27 March 1868 – 3 December 1876 — Major (from 28 November 1870, Lieutenant Colonel; from 14 July 1874, Colonel) Alexander Nikolayevich Tolstoy
- 8 December 1876 – 29 January 1879 — Lieutenant Colonel Prince Alexander Anatolyevich Baryatinsky
- 4 February 1879 – 19 July 1889 — Lieutenant Colonel (from 15 December 1881, Colonel) Anton Yegorovich von Saltza
- 31 July 1889 – 7 April 1897 — Lieutenant Colonel (from 17 July 1890, Colonel) Mikhail Yulyevich Levestam
- 25 April 1897 – 28 November 1899 — Colonel Rostom Ivanovich Saginov
- 29 November 1899 – 5 May 1901 — Colonel Alexander Lukich Kaizerov
- 5 May 1901 – 26 March 1904 — Colonel Vasily Davidovich Gabayev
- 2 May 1904 – 21 August 1906 — Colonel Mikhail Matveyevich Garanin
- 11 September 1906 – 4 April 1908 — Colonel Vladimir Nikitich Kolye
- 4 April 1908 – 26 April 1915 — Colonel (from 31 December 1914, Major General) Viktor Viktorovich Chaplin
- 20 May 1915 – 8 July 1916 — Colonel Konstantin Leonidovich Yevreinov
- 8 July 1916 – 20 September 1917 — Colonel Nikolai Apollonovich Morozov
- 9 October 1917 – unknown — Colonel Vladimir Mikhailovich Levestam
