= Otto von Feldmann =

German politician (1873–1945)

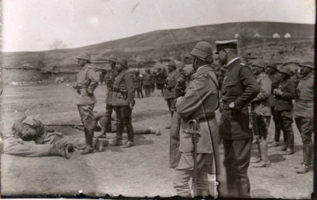
Battle of Sarikamish: Enver Pasha and Otto von Feldmann (right)

Otto von Feldmann (6 August 1873, Berlin – 20 May 1945) was a German military officer and politician.

Feldmann attended the Royal Grammar School in Bromberg (today, Bydgoszcz), the Kaiser-Wilhelm-and Ratsgymnasium in Hanover, the Kadettenvoranstalt in Potsdam and the Military Academy Gross-Lichterfelde near Berlin. By 1907, he served in the German General Staff. From 1910 to 1912, he served as company commander in the 5th Grenadiers Regiment, then again in the General Staff.

In 1913, Feldmann switched to Turkish service as part of the German military mission in the Ottoman Empire. There he was first a department head in the General Staff, then chief of staff of the First Army and finally, as Feldmann Pasha, Chief of the Operations Department in the Turkish Supreme Army Command. In this position, he participated in the Armenian genocide. Together with General Fritz Bronsart von Schellendorf, he was with the Turkish Minister of War, Enver Pasha, almost every day and coordinated with him. Feldmann once commented on this: "But it should not and must not be denied that German officers – and I am one of them myself – were forced to give their advice at certain times to free certain areas in the rear of the army from Armenians."

Feldmann was politically active from 1919 onward. From 1920 to 1933, he was state chairman of the German National People's Party. As Paul von Hindenburg's political operative, he managed the campaign for his election as Reich President in 1925 and headed Hindenburg's secretariat after his election. At the parliamentary elections of November 1933 and March 1936, Feldmann was elected as a deputy to the Reichstag as a "guest" of the Nazi Party faction.

In addition, Feldmann was a Gau chairman of the Pan-German League and a member of its national leadership.
