= Battle of Sarikamish =

Battle between Russia and the Ottoman Empire

Battle of Sarikamish Сражение при Сарыкамыше-Srazhenie pri Sarykamyshe Sarıkamış Muharebesi Սարիկամիշի Ճակատամարտ
- Part of the Caucasus campaign of the Middle Eastern theatre in World War I
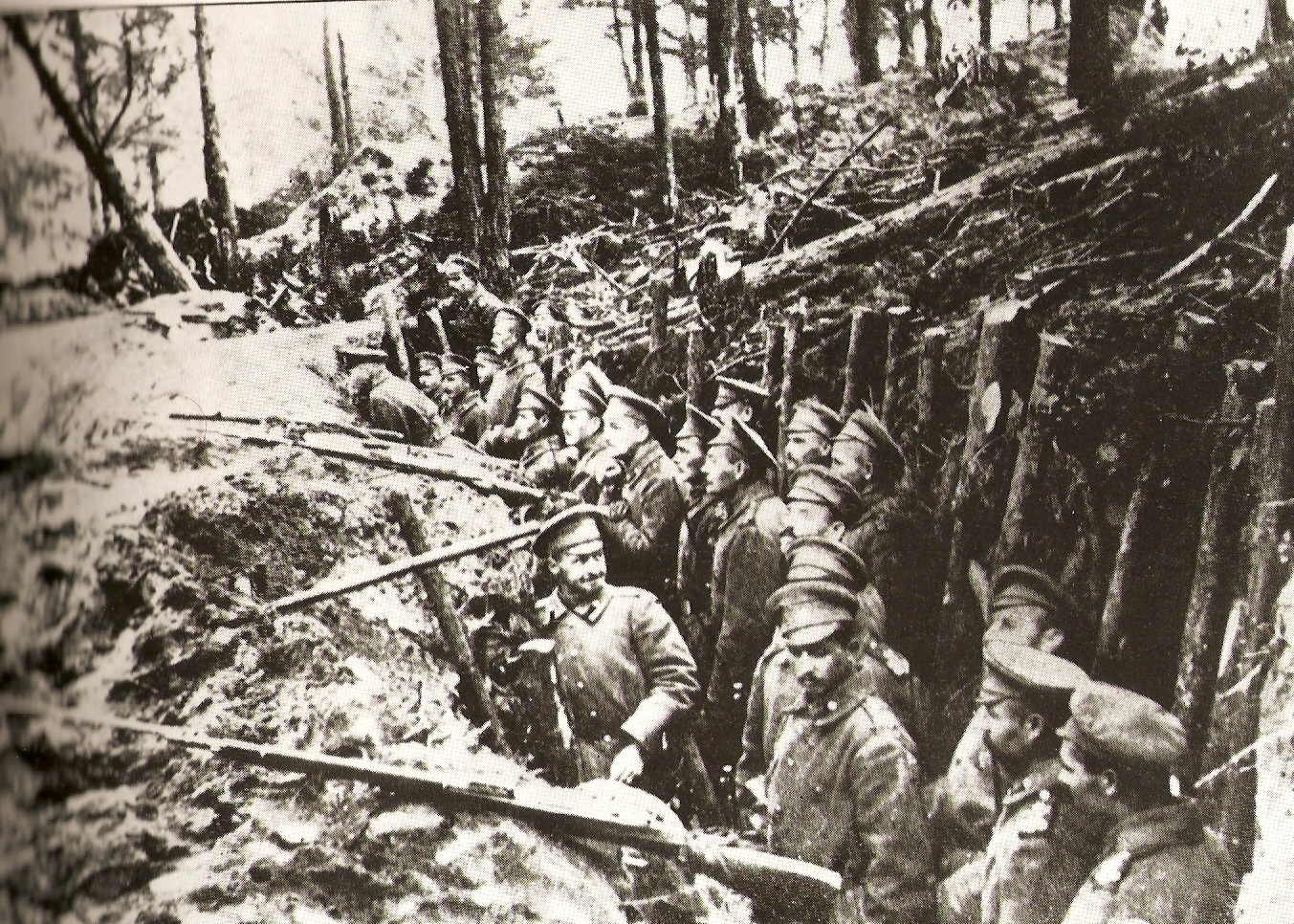
- Russian trenches in the forests of Sarikamish
Date	December 22, 1914 – January 17, 1915
Location	Sarikamish, Kars Oblast, Russian Empire 40.3381°N 42.573°E
Result	Russian victory
Territorial changes	Russia returns lands to Transcaucasia, as well as invades the border areas of the Ottoman Empire

Belligerents
(Russia) Russian Empire: Armenian volunteers	Ottoman Empire; Supported by: German Empire

Commanders and leaders
(Russia) Vorontsov-Dashkov (Russia) Nikolai Yudenich (Russia) General Bergmann (Russia) Myshlayevsky	(Ottoman Empire) Enver Pasha (Ottoman Empire) Hafiz Hakki Pasha; Bronsart Pasha; Feldmann Bey (Ottoman Empire) Yusuf Izzet Pasha (Ottoman Empire) Galip Pasha (Ottoman Empire) İhsan Bey (surrendered) (Ottoman Empire) Şerif Bey (surrendered) (Ottoman Empire) Ziya Bey (surrendered) (Ottoman Empire) Arif Bey (surrendered)

Units involved
Russian Caucasus Army: Russian Sarikamish Group; Russian Oltu Group	3rd Army

Strength
78,000	Turkish estimate: 100,000 Russian estimate: 90,000 to 150,000 people and 244 guns in battle 190,000 people and 300 guns in total

Casualties and losses
Russo-English sources: 20,000–22,000 (Note: 28,000 including 6,000 frostbitten) killed and wounded 6,000+ frostbitten	Turco-Russo-German sources: 30,000 (Note: 60,000 to 70,000 including 30,000 frostbitten)–48,000 (Note: 78,000 including 30,000 frostbitten) killed, wounded, and captured 30,000 frostbitten Some Russian–French sources: 90,000 casualties (from all cases) including: 28,000 KIA and 18,000 POWs (Note: The total number of Turkish prisoners in February 1915 according to archival Russian documents is 18,000 people, about 3,500 were taken directly near Sarakamysh.)

The Battle of Sarikamish (Note: Armenian: Սարիղամիշի ճակատամարտ (Sarighamishi chakatamart), Russian: Сражение при Сарыкамыше; Turkish: Sarıkamış Harekatı, lit. 'Operation Sarıkamış') was an engagement between the Russian and Ottoman Empires during World War I. It took place from 22 December 1914, to 17 January 1915, as part of the Caucasus campaign.

The battle resulted in a decisive Russian victory. The Ottoman plan relied on highly mobile troops capable of reaching specific objectives at precise times, drawing on German and Napoleonic tactical principles. However, the Ottoman forces were inadequately equipped for the harsh winter conditions and suffered severe losses in the Allahuekber Mountains. It is estimated that approximately 25,000 Ottoman soldiers froze to death before the main engagement began.

Following the defeat, Ottoman Minister of War Enver Pasha, who had devised the strategy at Sarikamish, blamed the Armenians for the outcome. The battle subsequently became a prelude to the Armenian genocide.

Some sources regard the battle as one of the most significant of the campaign, noting that the Ottoman Third Army was so severely weakened that it was forced to suspend operations temporarily.

== Background ==
Russia regarded the Caucasus Front as secondary to the Eastern Front, which received the majority of Russian resources. Russia had captured the fortress of Kars from the Ottoman Empire during the Russo-Turkish War in 1877, subsequently incorporating it into the militarily administered Kars Oblast. After the Ottoman Empire entered World War I in October 1914 on the side of the Central Powers, Russia feared a Caucasus campaign aimed at retaking Kars and the port of Batum.

From the perspective of the Central Powers, a campaign in the Caucasus would serve to divert Russian forces. The immediate strategic objective of the Ottoman Caucasus campaign was to recapture Artvin, Ardahan, Kars, and Batum. In the longer term, the Ottoman Minister of War, İsmail Enver, hoped that a successful offensive would open a route to Tbilisi and beyond, potentially provoking a revolt among Muslims in the Caucasus. Another strategic goal was to cut Russian access to hydrocarbon resources around the Caspian Sea.

== Prelude ==
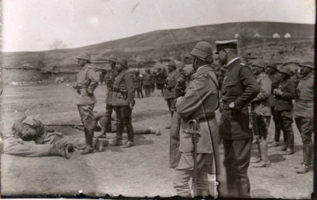
Ismail Enver and Otto von Feldmann inspecting the units

The headquarters of the Ottoman Third Army was located in Erzurum, under the command of Hasan Izzet Pasha. On 30 October 1914, the Third Army headquarters was informed by the High Command in Constantinople about the Ottoman Navy's bombardment of the Russian ports of Novorossiysk, Odessa, and Sevastopol in the Black Sea. The High Command expected the Russian Army to cross the Ottoman border at any time. The Bergmann Offensive (2 November 1914 – 16 November 1914) ended with the defeat of Russian forces under General Bergmann.

After a partial victory in the Bergmann Offensive, the Ottomans reinforced their Caucasian Third Army (50,000 soldiers) with the Tenth Corps (40,000 fresh troops). They correctly assessed that the Russian Caucasian Army did not receive significant reinforcements, apart from the Plastun brigades (11 battalions) and the 2nd Turkestan Corps (21 infantry battalions of 700 soldiers each, and 12 cavalry squadrons of 130 cavalry each). Before planning the Sarikamish Offensive, the chief of staff of the Ninth Corps, Şerif İlden, estimated the Russian strength at 60,000 soldiers, in line with the figure of 64,000 provided by Paul Muratoff.

The Ninth and Tenth Corps of the Ottoman Third Army consisted of well-trained soldiers; however, the army was poorly equipped for winter conditions. Ottoman sources record extremely high casualties from frostbite, though specific figures are not given. A significant portion of the 50,000–60,000 non-combat losses suffered by the Ottomans was due to frostbite and a typhus epidemic. In comparison, the Russians lost approximately 6,000 soldiers to frostbite and a further 12,000 to typhus, combat wounds, and other illnesses. Another factor contributing to the high Ottoman non-combat losses was inadequate logistics, rear services, and sanitary measures.

The Ottoman Minister of War, Ismail Enver Pasha, devised an operational plan while at the Department of War in Istanbul. His strategy was based on German principles derived from Napoleonic tactics. The plan involved a single envelopment maneuver using three corps. On the flank, the XI Corps was to fix Russian forces in place and conduct diversionary attacks. On the left, the X Corps (40,000 soldiers) under Colonel Hafız Hakkı and the IX Corps (28,000 soldiers) under Brigadier Ali İhsan Pasha would advance toward Kötek (30 km southwest of Sarikamish), 15 km northeast of the main Russian Army (estimated at 50,000 soldiers), and drive the Russians into the Aras Valley, where they would be destroyed by a coordinated attack from all three corps.

Initially, Hasan İzzet Pasha supported the outflanking maneuver and offensive, influenced by his trust in Enver Pasha. He finalized the details of the plan. On 17 December, Enver Pasha returned to Erzurum after inspecting the army and finding that Hasan İzzet Pasha had accepted the plan. In the presence of other officers, Enver Pasha told Hasan İzzet Pasha: "I am going to Erzurum. Either I will return to Istanbul from there, or I will watch your actions as a spectator."

However, on 18 December, Hasan İzzet Pasha telegraphed Enver Pasha:

IX Corps, X Corps' pioneers would arrive on the Kötek-Kars road in eight to nine days, meanwhile it is doubtful that the XI Corps, left alone, would not be crushed. When the pioneers come out of the great mountains, they will be in a difficult position against the enemy, who are not less than themselves. I see the outcome of this offensive field battle as doubtful according to our preparation. In case of failure, the long expedition will turn against us. Let's not give a pitched battle and be content with expelling the enemy in Id (Narman). For the future, hope is left for attack and invasion...

There is no record of Enver Pasha's immediate response to this message. Later on 18 December, Hasan İzzet Pasha telegraphed again:

I ask for forgiveness from my duty as I do not see the strength and confidence in myself to carry out these movements, and I am actually disturbed by an extraordinary nervousness.

Enver Pasha returned to Köprüköy in an attempt to persuade Hasan İzzet Pasha. When he failed to do so, Enver Pasha temporarily assumed direct command of the Third Army. His chief of staff, Bronsart von Schellendorf, and the head of the operations department, Major Otto von Feldmann (Turkish: Harekat Şubesi Müdürü), continued to serve under his leadership.

== Battle ==
=== Battlefield ===
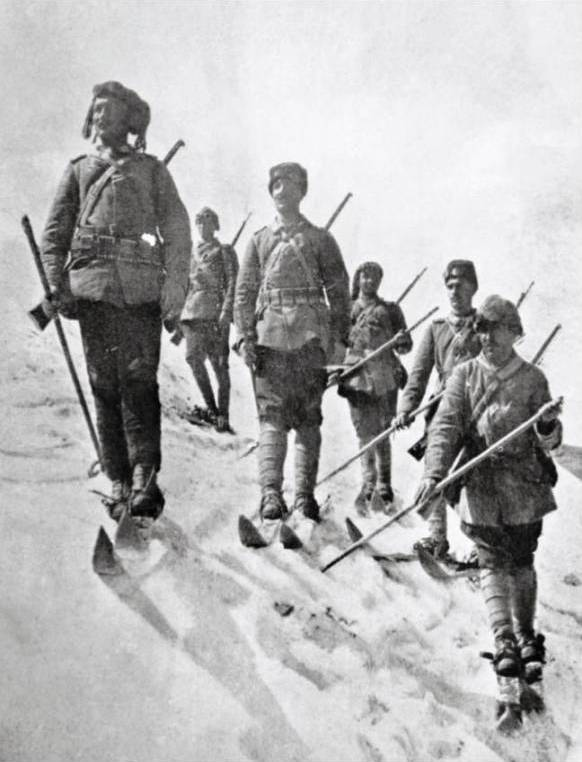
Ottoman Third Army winter gear

The war zone stretched approximately 1,250–1,500 kilometers (780–930 miles) from the Black Sea to Lake Van, making concentration of forces challenging. Operations were conducted on a plateau averaging 1,500–2,000 meters (4,900–6,600 ft) above sea level. The primary difficulty for the Ottomans was the poor state of the roads and inadequate transportation infrastructure. In contrast, Russia's main advantage was the Kars Gyumri Akhalkalaki railway line with a terminal at Sarikamish, located just 24 kilometres (15 mi) from the border.

The only viable routes through the Caucasian heights were high mountain passes near the cities of Kars and Sarikamish. Beyond these lay the upper valleys of the Aras and Euphrates rivers, extending westward. Elsewhere, roads were merely tracks, impassable to artillery. Forces were concentrated about 80 kilometres (50 mi) on either side of the border, with Kars serving as the main Russian fortress and Erzurum as the Ottoman counterpart.

The Ottoman Third Army, under Enver Pasha, comprised the IX, X, and XI Corps. A detachment (one infantry regiment and Special Organization (Teşkilat-ı Mahsusa) volunteers) known as Ştanke Bey Müfrezesi, commanded by German Lieutenant Colonel Stange, was sent to Artvin to reinforce the offensive and pin down Russian forces. The total fighting power included 90,000 regular troops, with the Russian Sarikamish detachment consisting of 60,000 infantry, 4,000 cavalry (Cossacks), and 14,000 reserves, totalling approximately 78,000 soldiers. Including reserves and personnel from the Erzurum Fortress, total Ottoman manpower reached 118,000, while overall numbers, including transportation units, depot regiments, and military police, reached about 200,000. The Ottomans had 73 machine guns and 218 artillery pieces, a figure comparable to the Russian artillery strength.)

Ottoman forces were inadequately prepared for winter conditions. The IX and X Corps began their long march without winter clothing and carried only dry bread and olives as rations. The XI Corps, positioned at the front, was in a similar situation.

On the Russian side, the 2nd and 3rd Caucasian Corps and the 1st Turkestan Corps had been sent to the Western Front, leaving the following composition in the Caucasus:

- 1st Caucasian Corps: 32 battalions
- 2nd Turkestan Corps: 21 battalions
- Three Plastun brigades: 18 battalions
- 66th Division: 16 battalions
- Various independent detachments

At the start of the war, the Russian forces included 100 infantry battalions (about 100,000 infantry), 117 cavalry companies (approximately 15,000 cavalry), and 256 artillery pieces:

(a) Erzurum–Kars sector:

- 39th Infantry Division (16 battalions, 48 guns)
- One brigade of the 20th Infantry Division (24 battalions, each with 1,250–1,300 soldiers)
- 1st Caucasian Cossack Division
- One brigade of the 1st Plastun Brigade (6 battalions, each with 600–800 soldiers)
- Total: 29 battalions, 30 sotni (Cossack cavalry companies), and 96 guns
- The 2nd Turkestan Corps (21 battalions, 42 guns) joined the battlefield on 16 November.

(b) Erzurum–Oltu sector:

- One brigade of the 20th Infantry Division
- One Cossack regiment (6 sotni)
- Total: 8 battalions, 6 sotni, and 24 guns

(c) Erevan–Bayazit sector:

- One brigade of the 66th Division (8 battalions)
- 2nd Kuban Plastun Brigade (6 battalions)
- 2nd Caucasian Cossack Division
- Transcaspian Cossack Brigade
- Total: 14 battalions, 36 sotni, and 52 guns

(d) Batum region:

- 264th Infantry Regiment (of the 66th Division)
- One battalion from the 1st Kuban Plastun Brigade (6 battalions)
- Total: 5 battalions with 8 guns, plus additional battalions from Frontier Guards.

(e) Persian Azerbaijan detachment:

- 2nd Caucasian Rifle Brigade
- 4th Caucasian Cossack Division
- Total: 8 battalions, 24 sotni, and 24 guns, under General Chernozubov.

The garrison at Kars included the 263rd Infantry Regiment (of the 66th Division), with 4 battalions.

During the Battle of Sarikamish, the Russian Caucasian Army was reinforced by Armenian and Georgian volunteers, as well as the newly formed 3rd Caucasian Rifle Brigade (8 battalions), bringing its total strength to around 130,000 soldiers. During the earlier Bergmann Offensive, the Russian Army had suffered approximately 7,000 casualties.

In the Sarikamish campaign, the Russian Army fighting the Ottoman Third Army consisted of 30 battalions of the 1st Caucasian Corps, 21 battalions of the 2nd Turkestan Corps, and 11 Plastun battalions, totaling 58,000 infantry and 4,000 cavalry. Additionally, there were 4 battalions of the 66th Division in Kars, the 3rd Caucasian Rifle Brigade (8 battalions), and the Siberian Cossack Brigade (12 sotni) in Tbilisi, totaling an additional 14,000 soldiers brought as reinforcements.

Apart from these, there were 12 Russian battalions in Batumi and surrounding areas, 8 battalions and 30 cavalry companies in Ağrı, and 8 battalions and 24 cavalry companies in Iranian Azerbaijan; these units did not participate in the Battle of Sarikamish.

In contrast, the Ottomans committed almost all available forces—90,000 soldiers and 218 guns—in an attempt to achieve a decisive victory. A key Russian advantage was that their troops were fully equipped with winter clothing and supported by a well-organized medical system. On the Ottoman side, from the start of the war, approximately 500 soldiers died daily in hospitals. The total number of hospital deaths exceeded 10,000, with additional significant losses from frostbite and typhus occurring outside medical facilities. Many Ottoman soldiers avoided hospitals, believing they had a better chance of survival in the field.

=== Initial manoeuvres, 22–25 December ===
On the far left flank, Hafız Hakkı’s X Corps, comprising 40,000 fresh troops, attacked General Istomin's brigade (8,000 infantry and 1,000 cavalry) on 22 December. The Ottoman 30th and 32nd Divisions advanced on Kaleboğazı, west of Oltu, while the 31st Division moved towards İd (now Narman). Following rearguard actions, the Russians cautiously retreated, and Istomin's brigade withdrew around Oltu. The 31st Division spent the night in Narman, located 15 kilometres south of Oltu.

On 23 December, the 31st Division captured 750 soldiers, including Colonel Kutatedza, and seized two guns. The 31st Division advanced on Oltu from the south, while the 30th and 32nd Divisions approached from the west. Due to a misidentification, the 32nd Division mistakenly opened heavy artillery and rifle fire on the 31st Division, believing them to be Russian troops. The accidental engagement lasted for two hours, after which General Istomin managed to withdraw with minimal losses.

Şerif İlden, citing information from a friend who participated in the battle, claimed that the Ottomans suffered around 2,000 casualties during this incident. However, historian Fahri Belen reported that after consulting multiple officers who were present, the highest estimate of Ottoman losses was 250.

In the following days, X Corps captured 250 Russian soldiers, four guns, and four machine guns. By midday on 23 December, Istomin had evacuated Oltu. Hafız Hakkı allowed his troops to pillage the town to boost morale, but as a result, provisions that could have sustained the Ottoman army for several days were lost.

Subsequently, Hafız Hakkı redirected X Corps towards the Sarikamish–Kars line instead of the initially planned Kars–Kötek line. This change extended the distance between X Corps and the 30th and 31st Divisions by approximately 40 kilometres.

On 23 December, the Russian 39th Division launched an attack against the Ottoman XI Corps and captured a significant number of prisoners.

Between 22 and 24 December, IX Corps advanced from Toygarlı village to Bardız village. Unlike X Corps, IX Corps did not engage in major combat, aside from dispersing Russian patrols. On the night of 24 December, the 29th Division occupied Bardız after its Russian front guards withdrew. Because the Russians had not destroyed the supplies in time, Bardız contained provisions sufficient to feed the corps for several days. Enver Pasha stationed guards at the supply depots to prevent looting, avoiding the mistakes made at Oltu.

Nevertheless, on the same day, 40% of the 17th Division's troops became stragglers due to a severe snowstorm.

On 24 December, General Vorontsov dispatched his deputy, General Myshlayevsky, and Chief of Staff General Yudenich, along with other officers, to meet General Bergmann at Micingirt (now İnkaya). Bergmann argued that the Turkish attack on Istomin's detachment was of local significance and that Istomin would retake Oltu once reinforced by the 3rd Caucasian Rifle Brigade. He also suggested that the 39th Division should continue its offensive on the main front.

General Yudenich disagreed, arguing that the attack on Istomin's detachment signalled a Turkish outflanking manoeuvre. He maintained that since the Ottomans were attempting to encircle the Russian right flank, it was critical to hold Bardız village to secure the road to Sarikamish, where the railway line passed. Yudenich believed it was unnecessary to launch further offensives and instead advocated for a defensive posture and reinforcement of Sarikamish.

General Myshlayevsky initially tried to incorporate both proposals into his orders, calling for an offensive to retake Oltu while simultaneously securing the roads to Sarikamish. However, at 11:30 a.m., he learned that Bardız had already been occupied by a strong Ottoman force. Consequently, he abandoned Bergmann's offensive objectives and adopted Yudenich's defensive strategy in his revised orders of the day.

=== IX and X Corps caught in the snowstorm (25–26 December) ===
On the night of 24 December, Enver Pasha and his headquarters staff — including Bronsart Pasha, Feldmann Bey, and Colonel Guse (all German officers) — reached Bardız village from Narman after a 14-hour journey on horseback. Enver proposed that IX Corps should immediately advance toward the Sarikamish railway, based on information from captured soldiers who claimed that Sarikamish was defended by only two to three improvised companies.

Enver asked IX Corps commander Ali İhsan Pasha for his opinion. Ali İhsan Pasha replied:

"... According to this situation (the 17th and 28th Divisions had not yet reached Bardız), it means that IX Corps currently has no forces at hand other than the 29th Division. I do not know the operational requirements concerning the army. It is said that there is no information from X Corps. If your aim can be realized with the strength of a single division tomorrow, the 29th Division is ready for action and command."

Bronsart Pasha and Major Feldmann agreed with İhsan Pasha's assessment. After three days of marching, IX Corps required rest. Moreover, communication between IX and X Corps had been severed after X Corps deviated from the initial plan by pursuing Istomin's unit along the Oltu–Ardahan road. Consequently, the commanders under Enver Pasha suggested waiting at Bardız until X Corps could reach its designated objective.

However, Enver Pasha believed that if Sarikamish — where the railway line passed — was captured, the Russian forces would have no escape route and would be forced to surrender.

On the morning of 25 December, the 29th Division set out toward Sarikamish, moving along a path covered by 30 cm of snow. The division reached Kızılkilise village, 8 kilometres northwest of Sarikamish, and prepared to bivouac there. Nevertheless, Enver Pasha ordered an immediate attack on Bardız Pass and then on Sarikamish beyond it.

On the evening of 25 December, two regiments of the 29th Division, under Enver Pasha's orders, entered the forest to encircle the Russian troops defending Bardız Pass. Hundreds of soldiers froze to death in the forest, which was filled with ditches and cliffs, reducing the division's strength by 50 percent. Bardız Pass was captured from approximately 1,000 railway workers at around noon on 26 December. Only one battalion, too exhausted to continue effectively, was able to pursue the retreating Russian troops and was ultimately unsuccessful in attacking Sarikamish alone.

That night, the division's commander and officers avoided frostbite by covering themselves in oilcloths together, while the situation for the soldiers was even more severe.

Meanwhile, X Corps under Hafız Hakkı pursued Istomin's brigade from 24 to 25 December. Istomin conducted a skillful delaying action, gradually retreating to Merdenek (now Göle) village. Eventually, the 30th and 31st Divisions of X Corps reached the northern slopes of the Allahuekber Mountains. Hafız Hakkı left a regiment to contain Istomin's detachment and led the remaining forces into the Allahuekber Mountains in an attempt to cut the Sarıkamış–Kars railway line.

The Allahuekber crossing was rugged and snow-covered, and soldiers required at least 19 hours to traverse it. At 2:00 a.m. on 26 December, the 30th and 31st Divisions entered the mountains but were soon caught in a severe snowstorm. According to Şerif İlden, around 10,000 soldiers died from frostbite in the Allahuekber Mountains. When these two divisions emerged on the night of 26 December, their numbers had been reduced to 3,200. X Corps had thus lost approximately 90 percent of its strength before even engaging in a major battle.

Despite this, Hafız Hakkı believed that stragglers could be gathered to bring his force back up to around 10,000 troops within two days, and he decided to continue the offensive.

=== Battle of Sarikamish (26 December – 4 January) ===
On the morning of 26 December, the strength of the Sarikamish garrison increased from about 2,000 makeshift defenders to approximately 3,500–4,000 soldiers. This included 1,500 regular troops, 1,000 railway workers, and 1,000 militia, along with several hundred rear-service volunteers. On this same day, Muratoff claimed that IX Corps still had 10,000 soldiers; however, Şerif İlden, chief of staff of IX Corps, stated that after the night attack on 25 December, only a force equivalent to one regiment — about 3,000 soldiers — remained. Only the 29th Division (nine battalions) and four battalions from the 17th Division managed to participate in the attack on 26 December. The battalions of the 17th Division numbered about 300 men each (1,200 total), while the 29th Division had about 1,800 soldiers (approximately 200 per battalion).

These figures aligned with an interview given by Ali İhsan Pasha (commander of IX Corps at the time) to a Russian newspaper after his capture, where he stated that he had only 6,000 soldiers remaining from an initial strength of 28,000. The 22,000 losses were due to desertion, frostbite, and disease.

On 26 December, Turkish forces launched a determined offensive that continued until evening. Turkish commanders eventually convinced Enver Pasha to stop the attack, which had been pushed forward on his insistence. Russian sources claimed that if the offensive had continued, Sarikamish might have fallen. In contrast, Turkish sources argued that the army suffered severe losses as a result of Enver Pasha's reckless "attack without regard for casualties" orders and that the Turkish forces were outnumbered, exhausted, and ill-prepared.

That night, General Voropanov, commander of the Sarikamish garrison, requested permission from General Myshlayevsky to destroy the warehouses and abandon Sarikamish, citing heavy casualties. Myshlayevsky insisted that Sarikamish must be held at all costs, as the Sarikamish–Kars railway was the only viable route for a Russian withdrawal. Both Myshlayevsky and General Bergmann had already been panicked by the Turkish encirclement attempts and had begun to consider defeat inevitable.

Meanwhile, five Turkestan battalions under Yudenich attacked Bardız, defeating the 82nd Regiment of the 28th Division with a bayonet charge. Observing this, the 32nd Division commander, Lieutenant Colonel Abdülkerim Bey, abandoned plans to move toward Sarikamish and engaged the Turkestan battalions instead.

On the evening of 26 December, Sarikamish received reinforcements: the 80th Kabardinsky Regiment (four battalions, each about 1,000 men) and the Zaporojski Cossack Regiment (six cavalry squadrons). With these reinforcements, the Russian force at Sarikamish rose to about 10,000 soldiers, albeit with limited artillery support.

On the Turkish side, efforts to reassemble dispersed deserters continued. By the afternoon of 26 December, the 83rd and 84th Regiments of the 28th Division arrived, but these units had also been severely depleted by forced night marches. Turkish sources do not record exact troop numbers, but it is estimated there were no more than 5,000 soldiers present on 27 December.

Enver Pasha renewed his "attack without regard for casualties" order for 27 December. The 29th Division managed to enter Upper Sarikamish village (known in Turkish sources as Çerkezköy) at midday, but Colonel Bukretov counterattacked and encircled the Turkish forces in the village.

Meanwhile, on 27 December, Hafız Hakkı Bey sent a cavalry regiment to occupy Selim station, where they destroyed part of the Sarikamish–Kars railway. Stange Bey, commanding an infantry regiment and Special Organization irregulars, captured Ardahan, defended by three battalions of the 3rd Plastun Brigade (about 2,000 soldiers).

On 24 December, Nasuhi Bey, chief of staff of X Corps, was captured. A copy of Enver Pasha's attack order was found on him, revealing to Russian commanders that IX and X Corps were both advancing on Sarikamish. General Myshlayevsky, believing he could not repel two corps with his weakened forces, feared total destruction. However, he was unaware that Turkish troop numbers had already been reduced by 80% due to attrition and desertion.

On 28 December, shaken by news of Ardahan's fall and the railway's destruction, Myshlayevsky left Mecingirt for Kağızman and then Tbilisi without appointing a new overall commander. Yudenich assumed command of the 2nd Turkestan Corps and six battalions of the 1st Caucasian Corps, while the remaining troops were commanded by Bergmann. Disputes between Bergmann and Yudenich arose over this arrangement, ultimately leading to Bergmann's dismissal after the battle and Yudenich's appointment as overall commander of what was formally named the Sarikamish Group.

The 30th and 31st Divisions only reached Sarikamish from Başköy–Beyköy on 29 December, delaying the plan to encircle Russian forces coming from Kars.

The Russian plan was to remain defensive against XI Corps, redeploy forces from that front to Sarikamish, and hold Sarikamish at all costs.

On 28 December, the 155th Kubinski Regiment (four battalions) and the 1st Plastun Brigade (five battalions) arrived at Sarikamish. The Russian force now comprised 20 infantry battalions, one cavalry regiment, 34 artillery pieces, and numerous machine guns under the 1st Plastun Brigade commander, General Przevalski. Muratoff estimated their total strength at 13,000–14,000 soldiers.

As IX Corps fell to about 1,000 soldiers, the 30th and 31st Divisions took over the main assault on Sarikamish. These divisions were also reduced to around 2,000 men. On the night of 29 December, the 93rd Regiment of the 31st Division briefly entered Sarikamish with 600 men but had to retreat under heavy counterattacks. Turkish forces occupying barracks in the town were captured the following morning.

On 30 December, Russians brought six mortars from Mecingirt and bombarded Turkish positions. After a fierce three-day siege, the Turks defending Upper Sarikamish surrendered. Russian sources claimed 300 surrendered, while Turkish sources reported only 20.

By 30 December, the 32nd Division and 82nd Regiment — initially 7,000 strong — had dwindled to 500 soldiers due to frostbite and desertion.

On 31 December, Enver Pasha unexpectedly ordered a general attack by X Corps. Though initially successful in penetrating the first Russian lines, the attack ultimately failed under heavy fire. By 1 January, IX Corps was reduced to 900 soldiers, most of them wounded and frostbitten. The 17th Division's machine gun company fought until the last man, and its weapons were recovered by a rear guard unit.

At this point, Enver Pasha was urged to withdraw to avoid personal capture, but he refused, declaring that he would die with his soldiers. Eventually, his trusted chief of staff, Şerif İlden, convinced him that the only remaining hope was to employ XI Corps to extract IX and X Corps.

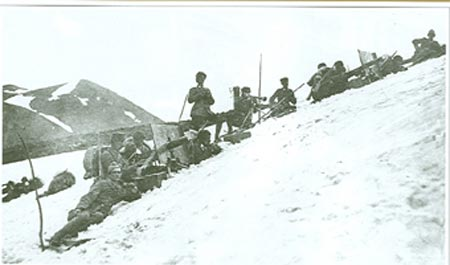
Ottoman machinegun troops at Sarikamish in January 1915

On 31 December, Yudenich convinced Bergmann — who was still considering withdrawal — to move his forces to Sarikamish and begin a decisive encirclement. Russian forces concentrated 7 battalions from Kars, 4 battalions of the 2nd Plastun Brigade, and 14 Cossack sotni (≈100 cavalry each) to surround IX and X Corps, which by then had shrunk to around 3,000 soldiers.

On 31 December, the arrival of the 154th Derbenski Regiment increased Russian active strength to about 7,000.

Colonel Bukretov, with six battalions from General Przevalski, attacked Bardız Pass. Turkish defenders fell from 700 soldiers on 31 December to 150 by 2 January. After this, Bukretov's force was also reduced to only 800 effective soldiers. On 2 January, Colonel Maslannikov, having replaced Bukretov, captured Bardız Pass with additional reinforcements.

By 3 January, IX Corps was completely surrounded, reduced to 104 soldiers and 106 officers after three days of attacks. X Corps had declined to 1,000–1,200 soldiers and successfully repelled attacks from 1–3 January.

On 2 January, Enver Pasha visited Divik to inspect X Corps and ordered the consolidation of IX and X Corps into a single command, the Left Flank Army, under Hafız Hakkı Bey, whom he promoted to brigadier general. Despite Hafız Hakkı's disastrous decision to cross the Allahuekber Mountains, Enver trusted him as a classmate from the War College. Hafız Hakkı Pasha was appointed commander of the 3rd Army five days later.

On 3 January, Sarikamish was overwhelmed with 12,000 sick and wounded Russians and 3,000 Turkish prisoners. General Bergmann ordered the transport of these men to Kars. Believing the congestion signaled a Russian evacuation, Hafız Hakkı delayed withdrawal, which proved a costly error.

=== Final defeat ===
On 4 January, Russian forces launched a general offensive. After putting up fierce resistance, IX Corps finally surrendered with 80 soldiers and 106 officers. At the time, Hafız Hakkı Pasha was meeting with IX Corps officers and narrowly escaped capture by mounting his horse and riding to X Corps under heavy fire.

X Corps managed to increase its strength to 1,800 soldiers by gathering deserters. On 4 January, despite being attacked by forces from Sarikamish in addition to General Baratov's detachment, X Corps was able to resist, even though its right flank was broken, avoiding the total collapse suffered by IX Corps. Hafız Hakkı Pasha withdrew X Corps during the night of 4–5 January. Despite being pursued by Russian forces, he managed to save all the corps' equipment and reached Bardız on 6 January. At that point, the 30th and 31st Divisions had a combined strength of approximately 2,500 rifles and 16 cannons.

Strength of the Third Army
	22 December	25 December	26 December	30 December	4 January	6 January
Third Army	90,000	63,000?	34,000?	20,000?	16,000?	25,000?
9th Corps	28,000	22,000	6,000~	1,000	104	0
17th Division	10,000?	7,500	2,500?	110	30-40	0
28th Division	9,000?	7,000	2,000?	700	30-40	0
29th Division	8,000?	7,500	1,500?	190	30-40	0
10th Corps	40,000	27,000?	10,200	3,000?	6,100	4,500?
30th Division	13,000	9,000?	3,200	1,800 rifle	1,800	2,500 rifle
31st Division	13,000	9,000?	3,200	1,800 rifle	1,800	2,500 rifle
32nd Division	13,000	9,000?	7,000	500	4,300	1-1200 rifle
11th Corps	22,000	18,000?	17,000?	15,000?	10,000?	10,000 rifle

Enver Pasha left X Corps on the morning of 4 January. On the way, the army headquarters was attacked by 8–10 Cossack cavalry, who were dispersed by return fire. During this skirmish, Bronsart Pasha, Enver's chief of staff, was wounded in the arm, and a telegraph officer was wounded in the foot. Enver Pasha reached Bardız around noon, which was held by the 32nd Division.

Enver ordered the 32nd Division to unite with XI Corps to attack the Russians in order to relieve IX Corps (unaware that it had already surrendered) and the retreating X Corps. Due to heavy fog on 4 January, the 32nd Division could not attack. In his report, Colonel Abdülkerim Bey, commander of the 32nd Division, stated that the strength of his division had increased from 500 to 4,300 soldiers after regrouping. This highlights that many of the casualties during the Sarikamish operation were actually due to desertion.

Abdülkerim Bey began his offensive on 5 January. However, after two days of fighting, the strength of the 32nd Division was reduced again to 1,500 soldiers by 6 January. The infantry regiment left by X Corps to face General Istomin on 26 December had also decreased to 2,000 soldiers. From an initial combined strength of 68,000 in IX and X Corps, fewer than 10,000 soldiers remained.

In a report dated 5 January, Galip Pasha, commander of XI Corps, requested two additional days to recover from the corps' losses before launching an attack. Despite this, Enver Pasha insisted on an immediate offensive, which began on 6 January but achieved no significant success apart from pushing back Russian forces slightly. On this day, Enver received a report from Hafız Hakkı Pasha confirming that IX Corps had been destroyed and the remnants of X Corps had gathered at Bardız.

Şerif İlden, chief of staff of IX Corps during the campaign, wrote in his memoirs that the battle might have been won by the Ottoman forces if Enver Pasha and Hafız Hakkı Pasha had not weakened the army by ordering forced marches on 25–26 December, which caused an estimated 80% loss of strength. Nikolski, who noted that the Russians had won "with great difficulty" after nine days of continuous fighting, also supported İlden's view. Nevertheless, these poor decisions led to a complete disaster for the Ottoman forces.

== Aftermath ==
Fearing that the front might collapse under a potential Russian counterattack, on 5 January Enver Pasha ordered the V Corps of the 1st Army, which was stationed around Skutari, to move rapidly to the Caucasus to reinforce the Third Army. However, Liman von Sanders, then commander of the 1st Army, wanted to keep this corps to defend Constantinople against a possible British-Russian attack. With the support of the German Embassy, he successfully prevented the V Corps from being redeployed.

Since the last hope of success had ended, and Enver Pasha was not permitted to stay away from Istanbul permanently, he left the army with his entourage on 9 January. Hafız Hakkı Bey (later known as Hafız Hakkı Pasha) was appointed commander of the Third Army and promoted to pasha (brigadier general).

General Yudenich subsequently sent 34 battalions—consisting of the 1st and 2nd Plastun Brigades (12 battalions), the 3rd Caucasian Rifle Brigade (8 battalions), and the 20th Infantry Division (14 battalions)—to Crimea to support the European front. (Muratoff wrote 43 battalions, which appears to be a typographical error.) After these transfers, the Russians rapidly mobilized about 100,000 reservists, formed an additional 17 battalions, and replenished existing units that had been depleted during the winter campaign. By the summer of 1915, the Russian Caucasus Army numbered approximately 130,000 infantry, 35,000 cavalry, and 340 guns. In comparison, the Ottoman forces in the region had about 52,351 soldiers and 131 cannons. Despite this, the Ottomans defeated the Russians in battles later that summer.

Although X Corps had managed to escape Russian encirclement, the Third Army—whose strength did not exceed 20,000 soldiers (the XI Corps had 10,000 rifles on 8 January after receiving 5,000 reinforcements from the Erzurum Garrison)—was pursued and attacked on all fronts. Due to the army's reduced numbers and the soldiers’ exhaustion, defeats occurred in various parts of the front, and many prisoners were captured. The detachment on the Oltu-Merdenek road was attacked by General Kalitin's force, consisting of 18 Cossack sotnias, 3 battalions of the 3rd Plastun Brigade, 2 battalions of the 263rd Regiment, and the Caucasian Cossack Division. Oltu, which had been captured by the Ottomans on 23 December, was recaptured by the Russians on 13 January, three weeks later. X Corps, attacked in the center, retreated from Bardız to Narman, while XI Corps retreated to east of Azap. From 19 January, the Russian offensive ceased, and relative calm settled on the front until April.

=== Casualties ===
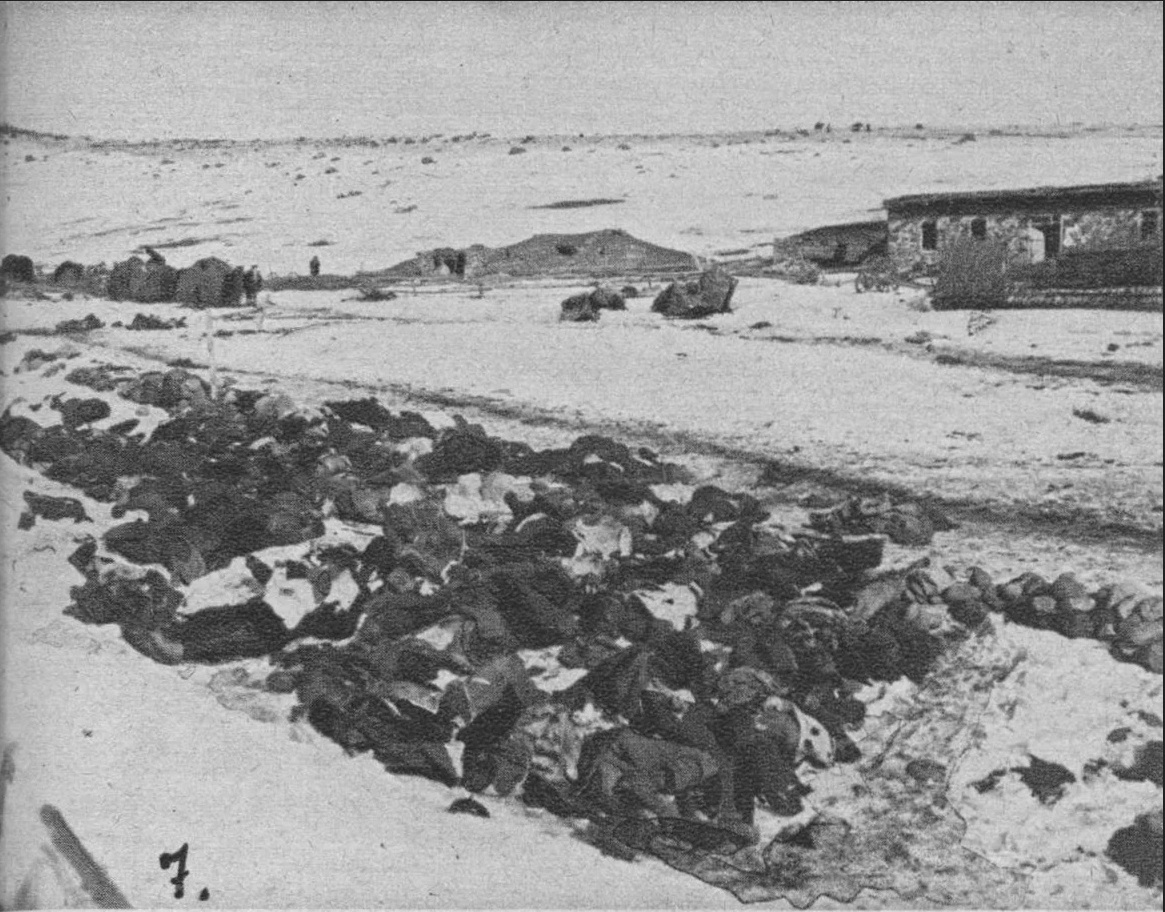
The bodies of the Turks

Russian casualties were estimated at up to 30,000: about 16,000 killed or wounded, and 12,000 sick or frostbitten. Ottoman losses, as reported by Hafız Hakkı Pasha and German Lieutenant Colonel Guse, were recorded at lower numbers: Hafız Hakkı Pasha estimated 30,000 deaths, while Guse gave two figures—11,000 deaths with 3,500 prisoners, and alternatively, 30,000 deaths with 27,000 prisoners.

Fevzi Çakmak, who served as Chief of the General Staff of Turkey between 1921 and 1944, claimed that total Ottoman casualties were 60,000 out of 118,000 men by 14 February 1915. According to his estimate, there were 23,000 buried in Russian territory, 7,000 captured, an estimated 10,000 dead in Ottoman territory, 10,000 killed over one month, and 10,000 who died in hospitals. This estimation was based on the difference between the army's strength before the battle (118,000) and its strength on 14 February (42,000) according to Ottoman documents.

However, this estimate contradicts some Turkish sources, as it omits the large number of deserters and approximately 20,000 reinforcements hastily sent to the front, (Fevzi Çakmak mentions only 6,000 reinforcements, which appears inaccurate).

Casualties during the winter campaign were largely due not to combat in the first days, but to frostbite and the spread of epidemic diseases in the following weeks. Hunger and fatigue—resulting from inadequate food supplies due to snow-blocked roads—further increased deaths from disease. A table published by the Turkish General Staff was used to inform the public about losses. Based on this table and simple calculations, it was suggested that total Ottoman losses in the Battle of Sarikamish were 109,108, though this figure omits deserters who were later regrouped. After gathering deserters and new recruits, the army's strength rose to 42,000 by 14 February.

Memoirs and reports from Turkish officers and commanders suggest total casualties were around 80,000: approximately 30,000 killed or wounded, 25,000 dead from cold, 20,000 who died in hospitals (mostly from epidemic typhus), and 7,000 taken prisoner.

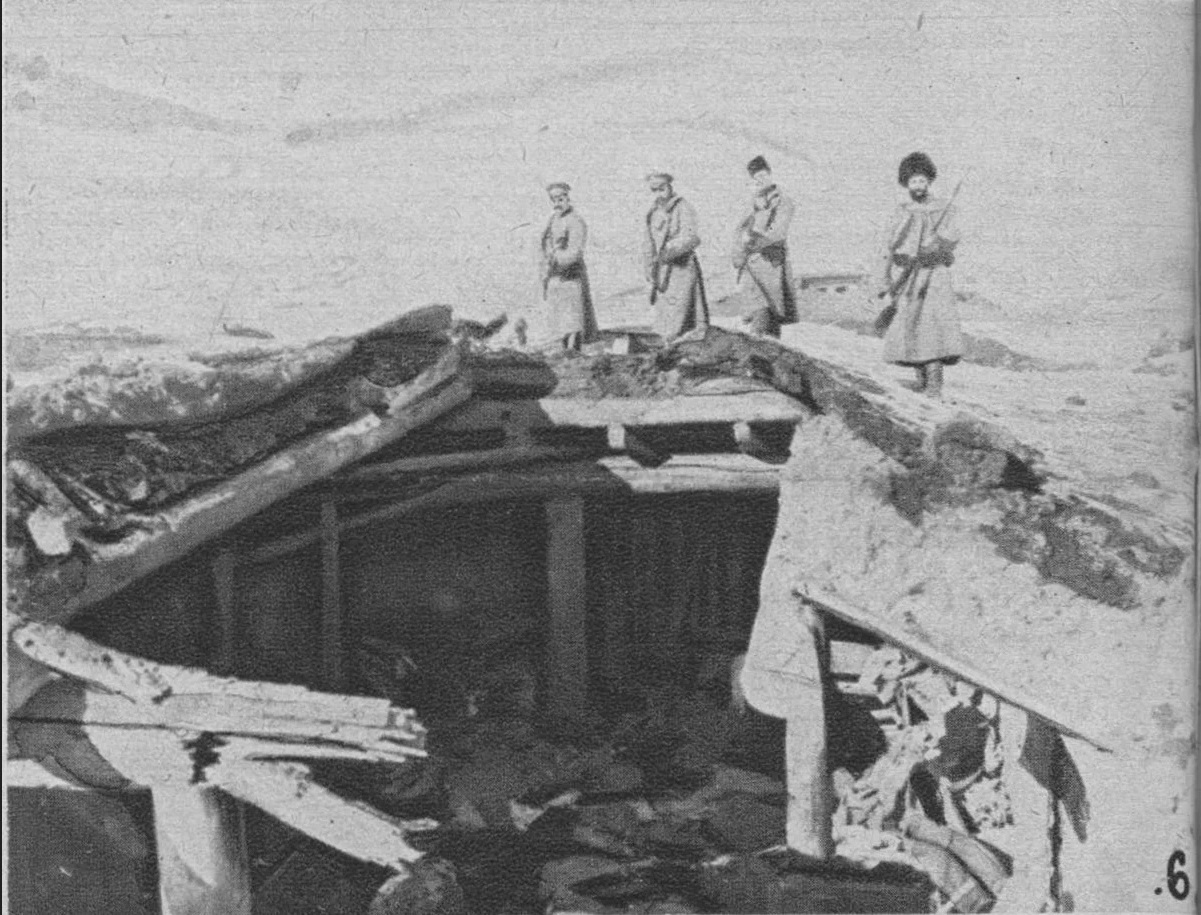
Russians stand over the bodies of the defeated Turks

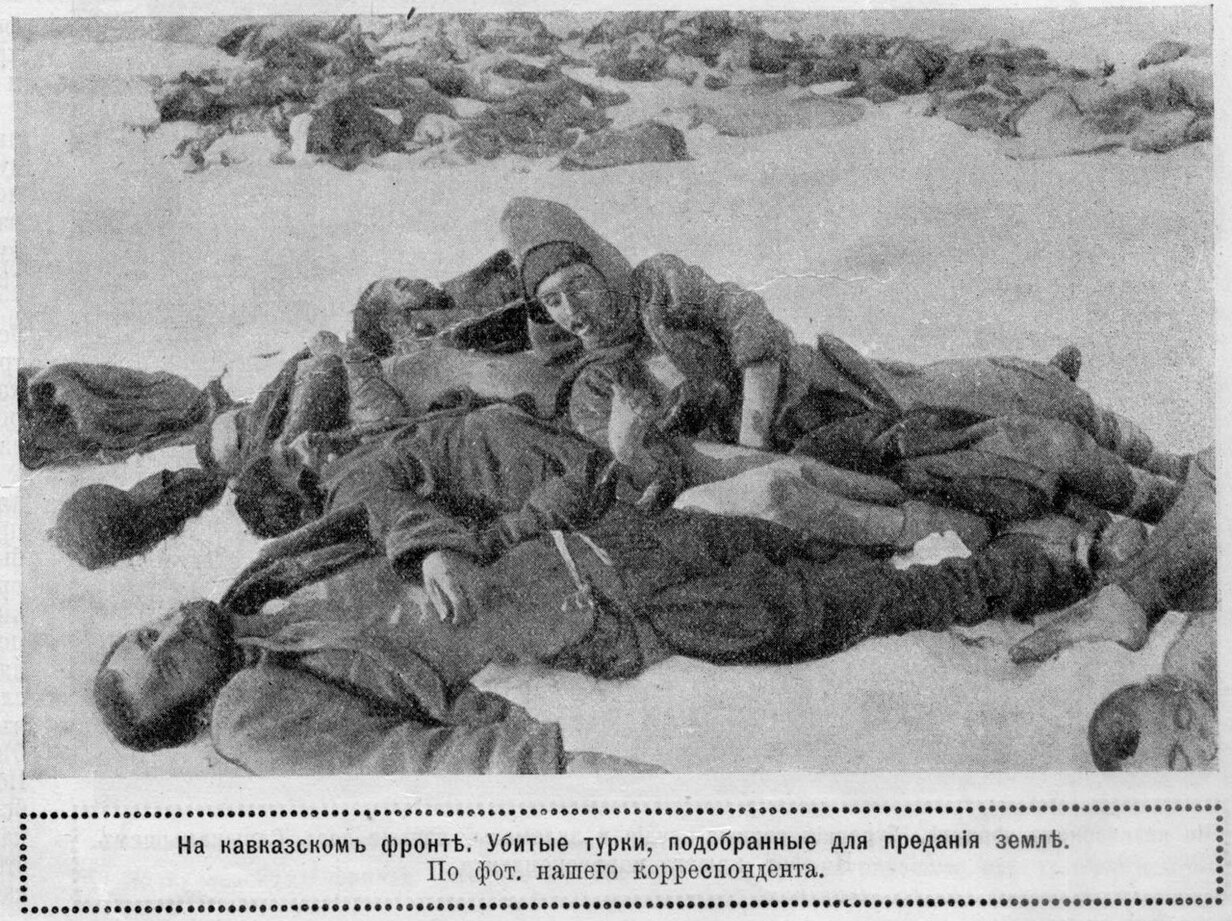
The corpses of Turks that the Russians took for burial

-
Unit	Men (22 December)	Soldiers (22 December)	Rifle (22 December)	Soldiers (18 January 1915)	Casualties
IX Corps	36,784	28,000	21,000	-	36,784
X Corps	48,943	40,000	28,000	2,200	37,800
XI Corps	27,019	?	22,274	5,200	22,819
2nd Cavalry Div.	5,428	?	4,386	1,500	3,928
Total	118,174	90,000	75,660	8,900	109,108

== Cultural references ==
- Ballads (Turkish: Ağıtlar) is a book published in 1943 by Yaşar Kemal. It is a compilation of folk themes that include accounts of the Battle of Sarikamish.
- Vetluga Memoir is a historical work describing the political and strategic mistakes made by the Ottoman Third Army and the final days of a corner of the Tsarist Empire. It was written by a young Turkish officer who was captured by Russian forces.
- 120 is a 2008 Turkish film depicting the story of 120 children who died while carrying ammunition to the front during the battle.
- The Long Way Home is a 2013 Turkish film about a group of seven people and their efforts to escape the war zone of Sarikamish.

== Sources ==
- Maslovsky, Evgeniy (1933). Мировая война на Кавказском фронте, 1914-1917 [The World War on the Caucasian Front, 1914-1917] (in Russian). Paris.
- Tucker, Spencer (1998). The Great War, 1914–18. Indiana University Press. p. 272. ISBN 978-0-253-21171-2.
- Erickson, Edward J. (2001). Ordered to Die: A History of the Ottoman Army in the First World War. Greenwood Publishing Group. p. 256. ISBN 978-0-313-31516-9.
- Muratoff, Paul; Allen, W. E. D. (1953). Caucasian Battlefields: A History of the Wars on the Turco-Caucasian Border 1828–1921. Cambridge University. p. 636. ISBN 0-89839-296-9.
- Hinterhoff, Eugene (1984). The Campaign in Armenia. Marshall Cavendish Illustrated Encyclopedia of World War I, vol ii. New York: Marshall Cavendish Corporation. pp. 499–503. ISBN 0-86307-181-3.
- Pasdermadjian, Garegin (1918). Why Armenia Should be Free: Armenia's Rôle in the Present War. Hairenik Publishing Company. p. 45.
- Pollard, A. F. (1920). A Short History of the Great War. London. p. 45. ISBN 1-4264-2248-2.
- Hacobian, Avetoon Pesak (1917). Armenia and the War: An Armenian's Point of View with an Appeal to Britain and the Coming Peace Conference. Hodder and Stoughton. p. 200.
- Özdemir, Yavuz (November 2018) [2003]. Sarıkamış Harekâtı [Sarikamish Operation] (in Turkish) (2nd ed.). İstanbul: Historia Publications. ISBN 9786058142114.
- Aydın, Nurhan (February 2015). Sarıkamış Harekatı [Sarikamish Operation] (in Turkish). İstanbul: Sonçağ Publishing. ISBN 9786055230869.
- İlden, Şerif (January 2018) [1922]. Sarıkamış [Sarikamish] (in Turkish) (10th ed.). İstanbul: Türkiye İş Bankası Cultural Publications. ISBN 9789754581485.
- Guse, Felix; Akoğuz, Hakkı (2007) [1 January 1931]. Birinci Dünya Savaşı'nda Kafkas Cephesi'ndeki Muharebeler [Battles on the Caucasian Front in the First World War] (in Turkish). Translated by Lieutenant Colonel Hakkı (Akoğuz) (2nd ed.). Ankara: Turkish General Staff ATASE Publications.
- Çakmak, Fevzi (2005) [1935]. Birinci Dünya Savaşı'nda Doğu Cephesi Harekâtı [Operations on the Eastern Front in the First World War] (in Turkish). Ankara: Turkish General Staff ATASE Publications. ISBN 975-409-323-7.
- Yergök, Ziya (January 2020) [Starting 15 July 1935]. Sarıkamış'tan Esarete [From Sarikamish to Captivity] (in Turkish) (10th ed.). İstanbul: Tarihçi Kitabevi Publications. ISBN 9789752466333.
- Null, Hafız Hakkı Pasha (2018) [26 October 1914-23 January 1915]. Hafız Hakkı Paşa'nın Sarıkamış Günlüğü [Sarikamish Diary of Hafiz Hakki Pasha] (in Turkish) (3rd ed.). İstanbul: Türkiye İş Bankası Cultural Publications. ISBN 978-605-332-344-0. "Hafız Hakkı Pasha left 18 December -16 January blank to write later in his diary. Since Hafız Hakkı Pasha passed away on February 15 due to the typhus epidemic, these 28 days remained empty. It is thought that the reason why the last day of the diary being January 23 is because of typhus disease as well."
- Eti, Ali Rıza (January 2016) [1914-1915]. Bir Onbaşının Doğu Cephesi Günlüğü [Eastern Front Diary of a Corporal] (in Turkish) (2nd ed.). İstanbul: Türkiye İş Bankası Cultural Publications. ISBN 978-9944-88-559-1.
- General Nikolski (1990) [1935]. Sarıkamış Harekâtı [Sarikamish Operation] (in Turkish). Translated by Retired Lieutenant Colonel Nazmi (2nd ed.). Ankara: Turkish General Staff ATASE Publications.
- Von Sander, Liman (1927) [1919]. Fünf Jahre Türkei [Five Years in Turkey]. Annapolis, Maryland: The United States Naval Constitute – via Questia.
- Oleynikov, Alexei (2016). Россия-щит Антанты [Russia-Shield of Entente]. Foreword by Nikolai Starikov. St.Petersburg: Piter. ISBN 978-5-496-01795-4.
