= İhsan Sökmen =

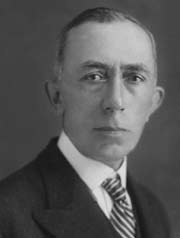
- Born: 1873; Constantinople, Constantinople Vilayet, Ottoman Empire
- Died: 26 December 1955 (aged 82); Istanbul, Turkey
- Military career
- Allegiance: Ottoman Empire; Turkey
- Branch: Ottoman Army; Turkish Armed Forces
- Service years: 1895–1915; 1919–1923
- Rank: Mirliva
- Commands: IX Corps
- Conflicts: Greco-Turkish War; First Balkan War; Second Balkan War; World War I; Bergmann Offensive; Battle of Sarikamish; Turkish War of Independence
- Awards: Liakat Medal; Order of Osmanieh; Order of the Medjidie; Gallipoli Star; Medal of Independence

İhsan Lâtif Sökmen, also known as Ali İhsan Pasha (1873 – 26 December 1955) was a Turkish soldier and politician who is notable for his participation in World War I.

== Biography ==
After graduating from the Military Academy in 1895, he took part in the 1897 Greco-Turkish War and the Balkan Wars. He served as the Military Attaché in Athens, the Chief of Staff of the Yemen Army Corps, the Commander of the Edremit Division, and the Commander of the Mus Division. When World War I began Caucasus Front's 9th Corps in carrying out the tasks Sarikamish battle during the Russian army fell prisoners on 22 December 1914, and was exiled to Siberia. He managed to escape from Siberia in May 1915 and returned to Istanbul in September 1915 through China, Japan, the United States and Greece. He retired in October 1915.

He served as Istanbul Şehremaneti Yeniköy Mayor and Pursaklar Inspector. He returned to active duty in 1919. He was appointed as the Head of the Divan-ı War and War Department. In the same year, he was appointed as the Head of Association for Defence of National Rights, a secret organization, by the Ankara Government. In this capacity, he ensured that weapons and ammunition were sent to Anatolia in order to support the Turkish War of Independence. Sökmen was honored with Medal of Independence with Red Stripe for Achievement.

After the Turkish War of Independence, he served as the İzmir Housing District Manager for a short time, and was appointed to the İzmir Governor's Office in 1924. He was elected as Istanbul deputy in the second parliamentary by-elections in 1926. He served as a deputy for Istanbul between 1927 and 1931 and Giresun between 1931 and 1946. IV. Period National Defense Committee Chief, V. and VI. Period Arzuhal Committee Headship, VI. and VII. He served as the Chairman of the Library Committee.

He was married and had two children.

== Works ==
- Serencam-i Harp
- Iran's Military and its Policy
