= Galip Pasha =

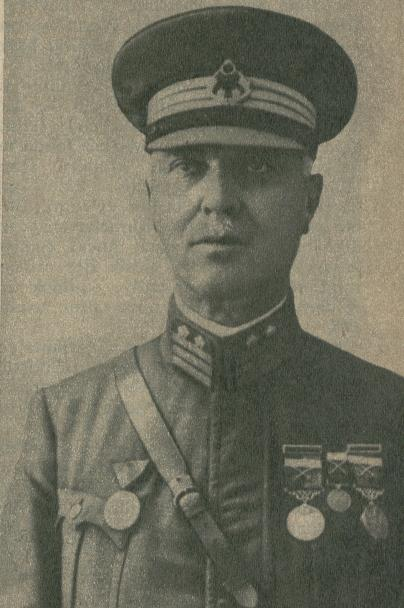
- Born: 1868; Trabzon, Trebizond Vilayet, Ottoman Empire
- Died: 1939 (aged 71); Istanbul, Turkey
- Military career
- Allegiance: Ottoman Empire; Turkey
- Branch: Ottoman Army; Turkish Armed Forces
- Service years: 1902–1931
- Rank: Birindji ferik
- Conflicts: First Balkan War; Second Balkan War; World War I; Bergmann Offensive; Battle of Taif; Turkish War of Independence

Ali Galip Pasiner (Formerly known as Galip Pasha) was an Ottoman Birindji Ferik and Turkish politician who was notable for his participation in World War I.

== Biography ==
He graduated from Erzincan High School in 1885 and from the Military Academy in 1888. He joined the Action Army, which came to Constantinople after the March 31 Incident. On August 12, 1909, he was appointed to the General Directorate of Security, which was established to replace the Ministry of Security, which was abolished in June of the same year. In the same year, he made a study trip on the police affairs of European countries and formed the current basis of the police organization. During the abdication of Abdul Hamid II, he ensured his safety and security.

He was appointed as the Governor and Commander of the Hejaz on April 5, 1915. Upon the revolt of Sherif Hussein, he was captured by the British forces in the city of Taif after 105 days of resistance and remained prisoner in Egypt for three years.

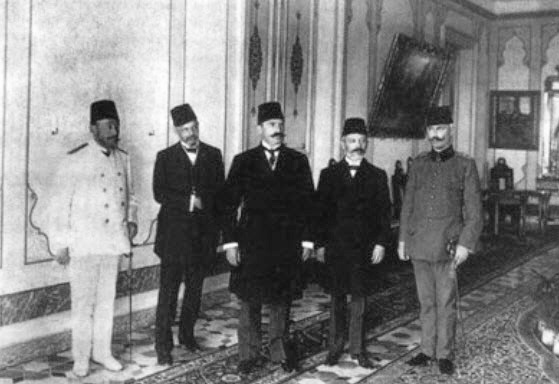
A delegation of four people, appointed by the Milli Majlis to notify Abdulhamid's decision and visited the palace on Tuesday afternoon, April 27, 1909: from left to right: Arif Hikmet Pasha, Emanuel Karasu Efendi (Carasso), Esad Pasha Toptani, Aram Efendi and Mr. Miralay Galip (Pasiner)

He came to Ankara in 1920 and joined the Turkish War of Independence. He was appointed as the Governor of Konya on January 12, 1921. Although he was appointed as the ambassador to Bukhara in 1922, he could not go to this duty after the occupation of Bukhara by Soviet Russia. After the Great Offensive, he was appointed to the Chief of War of the Temporary Supreme Officer Court, which was established in İzmir. After the war, he was awarded the Red Stripe of the Turkish Medal of Independence for his achievements by Atatürk. He served as the Chief of War of the Erkan Court of the Ministry of National Defense established in Istanbul and the Second President of the Military Appeal Court. He retired from the Turkish Armed Forces on October 3, 1931 at his own request.
