= Ilia Odishelidze =

Russian general (1865–1924)

ილია ოდიშელიძე Ilia Odishelidze
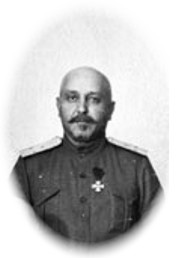
- Lieutenant general Odishelidze
- Born: 25 March 1865; Georgia, Russian Empire
- Died: 1924 (aged 58–59)
- Military career
- Allegiance: Russian Empire (Georgia (country)) Democratic Republic of Georgia
- Branch: Imperial Russian army
- Service years: 1887–1921
- Rank: Lieutenant General & general-in-chief (Russia); General of the Infantry & General of the army (Georgia)
- Commands: 15th Army Corps; 1st Army; 3rd Army; Caucasian Army; Army of the first Republic
- Awards: Order of St. Anna, Order of St. Vladimir, Légion d'honneur

Ilia Odishelidze (Georgian: ილია ოდიშელიძე); Russian: Илья Зурабович Одишелидзе, Ilya Zurabovich Odishelidze) (25 March 1865 – c. 1924) was a Georgian military leader who had also served as a general of the Imperial Russian army.

== Biography ==
Born in Georgia, then part of the Russian Empire, he graduated from the 3rd Alexander’s School (1887) and the General Staff Academy in St Petersburg (1894). The next ten years were spent in military work in various regions of the empire. He took part in the Russo-Japanese War (1904–1905) in the capacity of a chief of staff of the 6th Eastern Siberian Division. He served, from 9 November 1911 to 9 January 1914, a governor general of Samarkand and was moved afterwards as a chief of staff of the Turkestan Military District.

Promoted to lieutenant general on 11 October 1914, he was Chief of Staff of the 10th, and later of the 1st Army. In 1917 he held command over the 15th Army Corps, 1st and 3rd armies. On October 2, 1917 he was appointed the commander-in-chief of the Caucasus Army. In January 1918 he was in command at Erzurum. During the total collapse of the Tsarist administration he tried to prevent the imperial army's disintegration, then resigned as a commander and helped to organize national Georgian divisions.

In March 1918, he served as deputy minister of war for the Transcaucasian Commissariat, but was sacked for his nationalistic sentiments. After Georgia’s declaration of independence (May 26, 1918), he held various important posts in the national armed forces and served as the commander-in-chief of army from the fall of 1920 to February 1921.

After the Soviet invasion of Georgia, his fate becomes unclear. According to some sources, he was shot by the Bolsheviks in 1921. He, however, appears to have fled to Turkey, where he died around 1924. Odishelidze's son Alexander, a colonel of the Georgian army, moved to France, where he died in 1933.

== Honours and awards ==
- Order of St. Stanislaus, 3rd class (1902)
- Order of St. Anne, 3rd class with swords and bow (1905)
- Order of St. Vladimir, 4th class with swords and bow (1905)
- Order of St. Vladimir, with Swords 3rd class (1905)
- Gold Sword for Bravery (29 March 1905)
- Order of St. Anne with Swords 2nd class (1906)
- Order of Saint George, 4th class (1907)
- Order of St. Stanislaus, 1st class (6 December 1912).

== See also ==
- List of Georgian people associated with the Democratic Republic of Georgia
