= Caucasus Army (Russian Empire, 1914–1917) =

WWI field army in the Caucasus and Persia

Russian Caucasus Army Росси́йская Кавказскaя армия
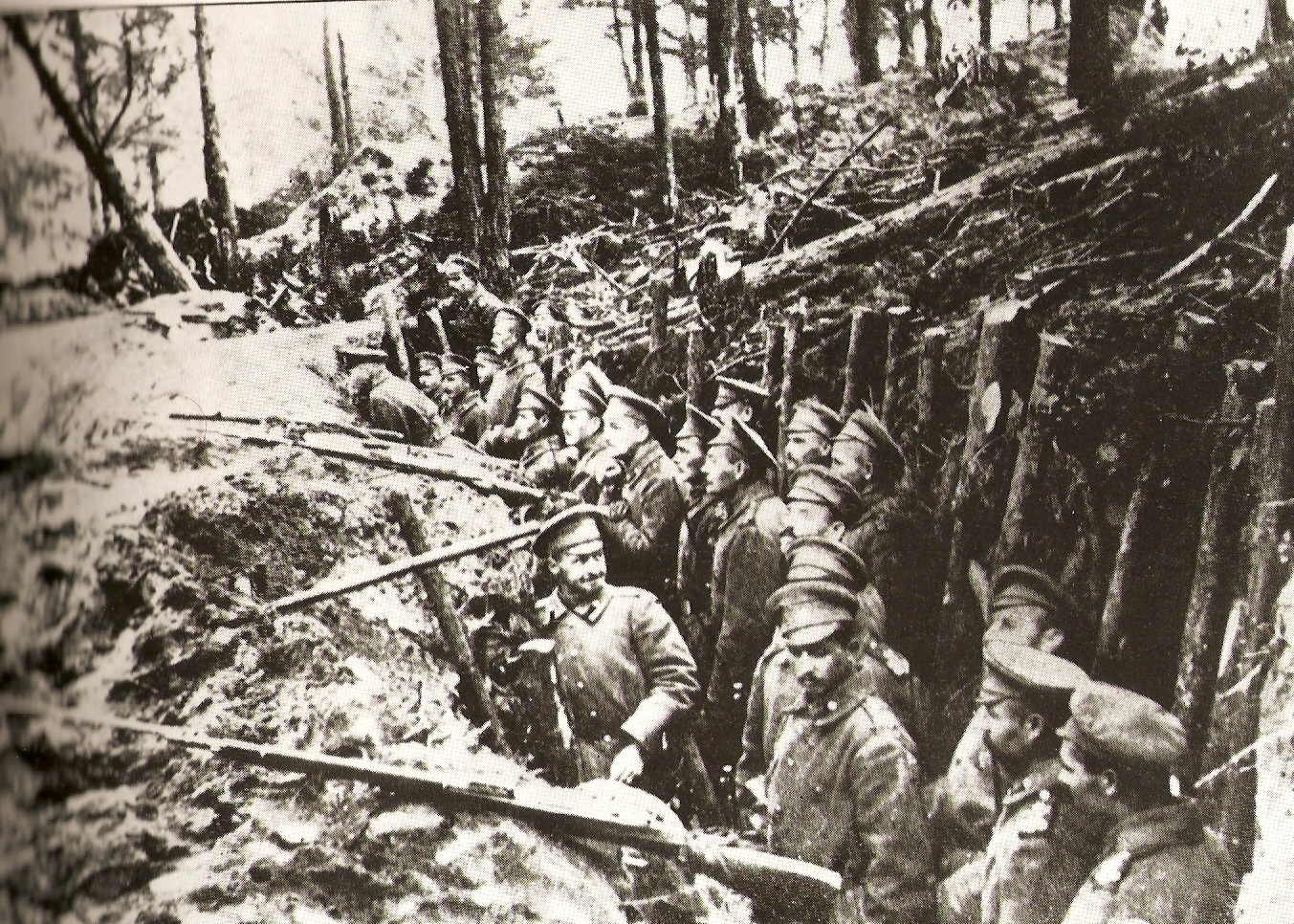
- Soldiers of the Russian Caucasus Army in the forests of Sarikamish.
- Active: 1914–1918 (after April 1917 as Caucasus Front)
- Country: Russian Empire
- Branch: Regular Army
- Type: Field Army
- Engagements: Caucasus Campaign; Persian Campaign

Commanders
- Notable commanders: Illarion Ivanovich Vorontsov-Dashkov (1914 – January 1915); Nicholas Nikolaevich (January 1915 – March 1917); Nikolai Yudenich (March 1917 – April 1917)

The Russian Caucasus Army (Russian: Кавказскaя армия) of World War I was the Russian field army that fought in the Caucasus Campaign and Persian Campaign of World War I. It was renowned for inflicting heavy casualties on the opposing forces of the Ottoman Empire, particularly at the Battle of Sarikamish. It was also known for its extremely diverse ethnic composition, consisting of units from throughout the Russian Empire and both soldiers and officers from the many ethnic communities settled since the 1877-78 Russo-Turkish War in the militarily administered Kars Oblast in the Russian Transcaucasus. These included Georgians, Caucasus Greeks, and Armenians - the latter in particular strongly represented among both the soldiers and senior officers - as well as ethnic Russians and Ukrainians.

== Period of existence ==
The Caucasus Army was formed in July 1914 from units of the Caucasus Military District. It ceased to exist in April 1917 when it was reorganized as the Caucasus Front, although this Front contained many of the same units and continued fighting in the same theater. This Front in turn formally ceased to exist in March 1918. It withdrew from Armenia that year.

== Organization ==
=== Order of Battle, 1914 ===
The Caucasus Army was under the nominal command of the Governor General of the Caucasus Illarion Vorontsov-Dashkov at the start of hostilities. His chief of command was Aleksandr Zakharevich Myshlayevsky. The Caucasus Army had 100 battalions of infantry, 117 sotnis (cavalry squadrons), and 256 guns for a total of 100,000 troops, in other sources it had had 153 battalions of infantry, 175 sotnis, and 350 guns Before the war the army was dispersed into two groups according to the two main operating areas: the Kars group (Kars - Erzurum) with 6 divisions in the region of Otu - Sarikamish and the Erivan group (Erivan - Alashkert) with 2 divisions, reinforced by a large number of cavalry, in the vicinity of Igdir.

The flanks were covered by small units formed from the Border Guard, the Cossacks, and the militia. Due to the defeats at the Battle of Tannenberg and the Masurian Lakes, the Russians redeployed almost half their forces to the Prussian front, leaving behind just 65,000 troops from the initial 100,000 to face the Ottoman army.

- Caucasus Army Corps from November 12, 1914, April 2, 1915 Berhman George E.
  - 2 infantry divisions
  - 2 cossack rifle brigades
  - 1st Caucasian Cossack division under command of General Baratov
- Turkistan Army Corps Lieutenant-General (from 23 October 1914, General of Infantry) Lesh, Leonid Vilgelmovich
  - 4-I Turkestan Rifle Brigade
  - 5-I Turkestan Rifle Brigade
  - 1-I Transcaspian Cossack Brigade
  - 1st Caucasus Kuban Cossack regiment
  - 2nd Turkestan Battalion
  - Kushkinskaya Oboznaya company

The 1914 engagements were Bergmann Offensive, Ardahan, and Battle of Sarikamish

=== Order of Battle, 1915 ===
It was under the nominal command of the Governor General of the Caucasus Nicholas Nikolaevich beginning with the January 1915. His chief of command was Nikolai Yudenich.

- Caucasus Army Corps from February 2, 1915, to 12. March 1917 Kalitin, Pyotr Petrovich
- Turkistan Army Corps from February 3, 1915, to 3 April 1917 General of Infantry Przewalski, Michael A.

The 1915 engagements were Battle of Dilman, Van, Battle of Manzikert (1915), and Kara Killisse

=== Order of Battle, 1916 ===
The 1916 engagements were Erzincan, Erzerum Offensive, Trebizond Campaign, Battle of Bitlis, and Mush.

=== Order of Battle, 1917 ===
It was under the nominal command of Vasily Kharlamov of Transcaucasian Commissariat beginning with the May 1917. His chief of command was Ilia Odishelidze.

- Caucasus Army Corps from April 12, 1917, Lyakhov, Vladimir Rakhmanov
- Turkistan Army Corps from April 25 to 12 October 1917 - Lt. Gen. Chaplygin, Alexander; 12 October 1917 – ? - Lieutenant General Savitsky, Hippolyte V.

== Commanders ==
- 30.08.1914 – 23.01.1915 — Alexander Myshlayevsky (de facto)
- 24.01.1915 – 03.03.1917 — Nikolai Yudenich
- 03.04.1917 – 11.09.1917 — Mikhail Przhevalsky
- 05.06.1917 – 16.06.1917 — Nikolai Baratov
- 18.06.1917 – 24.10.1917 — Vladimir De Witt
- 02.10.1917 – ??.03.1918 — Ilia Odishelidze

== Notable officers ==
- Georgian Ilia Odishelidze
- Russian Theodore G. Chernozubov
- Armenian Tovmas Nazarbekian
- Armenian Movses Silikyan

== See also ==
- Armenian volunteer units
