= Caucasus Military District =

Military district of the Russian Empire

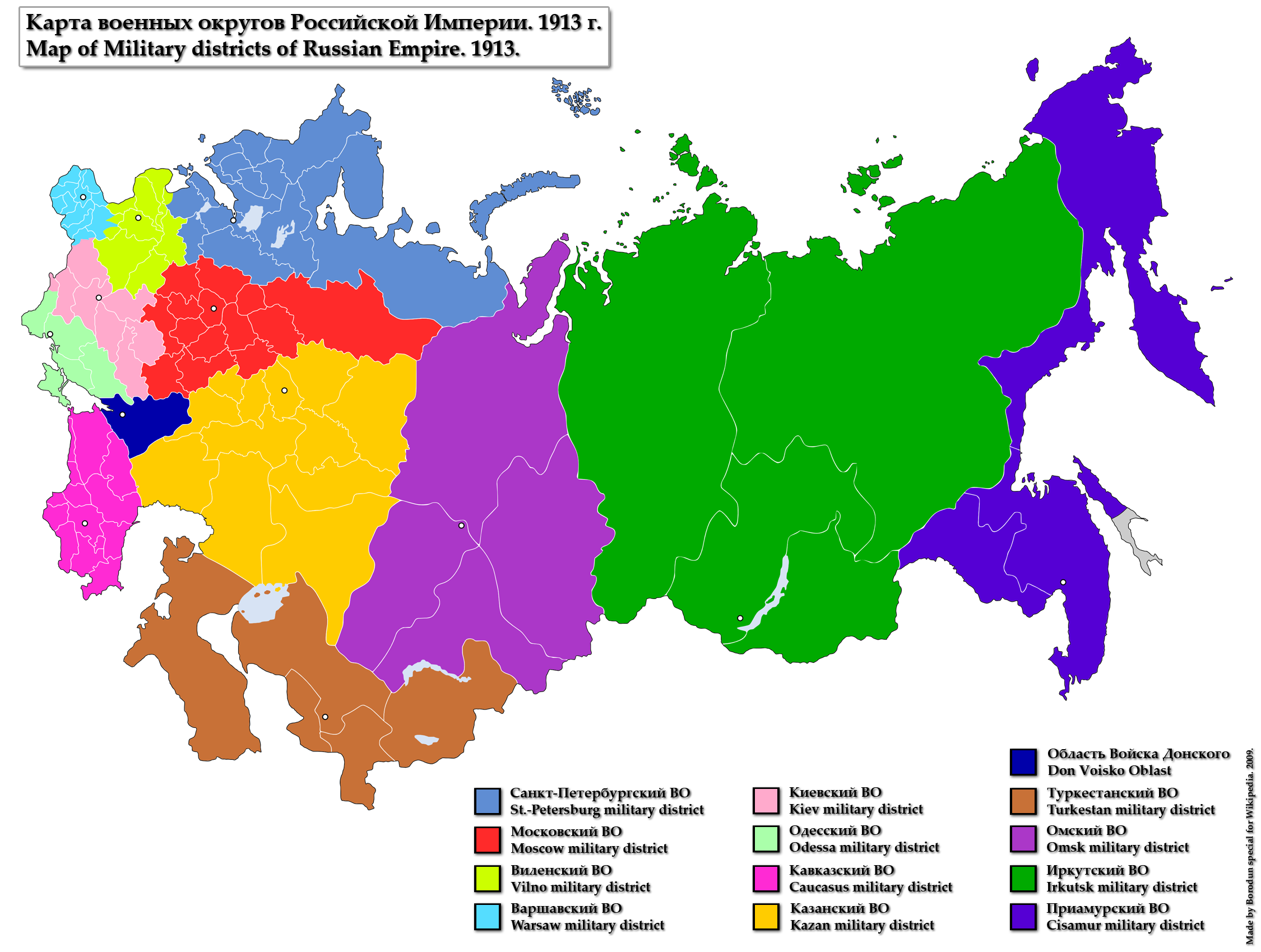
Russian military districts in 1913. Caucasus Military District is shown in purple at the left.

The Caucasus Military District (Russian: Кавказский военный округ, Kavkazskiy voenniy okrug) was a military formation of the Imperial Russian Army. It was created in 1865 as the successor to the Caucasus Army, and was dissolved in 1917.

== History ==
The Caucasus Military District was created as part of the military reforms of the minister Dmitry Milyutin.

During the entire existence of the District, the District Commander in Chief was also supreme civil authority in the Caucasus and Ataman of Caucasian troops. In 1865 - 1881 and again in 1905 - 1917, the District Commander in Chief was also His Majesty's Viceroy in the Caucasus.

On the formation of the District, the Grand Duke Mikhail Nikolayevich (who had already been His Majesty's Viceroy in the Caucasus and Commander in Chief of the Caucasus Army since December 6, 1862) became its first Commander in Chief. On August 23, 1915 (during the First World War), the Grand Duke Nikolai Nikolaevich was appointed to this post, a post he held until February 3, 1917.

The Caucasus Army was formed in July 1914 from units of the Caucasus Military District. This army ceased to exist in April 1917 when it was reorganized by the new Russian Republic as the Caucasus Front, although this Front contained many of the same units and continued fighting in the same theater. This Front in turn dissolved and formally ceased to exist in March 1918.

== Area ==
After a series of changes in 1866, 1868, 1878, 1881, 1883, 1898 and 1899, by 1914 the area of the District included seven provinces (Stavropol, Tiflis, Kutaisi, Elisavetpol, Baku, Erevan and the Black Sea) and five regions (Kuban, Terek, Dagestan, Kars and Batumi) - a total of 12 administrative divisions, of which three were in the north and nine in the Caucasus, these nine forming the Caucasian Viceroyalty of which the Commander in Chief of the district was viceroy.

== Composition of forces ==
- I Caucasus Army Corps
- II Caucasus Army Corps
- III Caucasus Army Corps
- Fortress of Alexandropol
- Fortress of Kars
- Fortress of St. Michael's (Batumi)

== Commanders of the Caucasus Military District ==
- Adjutant General, General of Artillery, and (from April 16, 1878) Field Marshal Grand Duke Mikhail Nikolayevich: 1865 - July 14, 1881
- Adjutant General and General of Cavalry Prince Alexander Mikhailovich Dondukov-Korsakov: January 1, 1882 - June 3, 1890
- Adjutant General and Lieutenant General Sergey Sheremetev: June 3, 1890 - December 12, 1896
- Adjutant General and General of Infantry Prince Grigory Golitsyn: December 12, 1896 - January 1, 1905
- Lieutenant General James D. Malama: January 1, 1905 - February 21, 1905
- Adjutant General and General of Cavalry Count Illarion Vorontsov-Dashkov: February 27, 1905 - August 30, 1914
- Adjutant General and General of Cavalry Grand Duke Nikolai Nikolaevich: August 30, 1914 - February 3, 1917
- General of Infantry Alexander Alexander Myshlayevsky: March 7, 1917 - June 2, 1917
