= Russian Caucasus Forces (before 1865) =

Before the creation of the Caucasus Military District in 1865, Russian forces in the Caucasus were organized, at different times, in a number of formations under various names.

== Before 1815 ==
In 1777, the Russian troops located at Kizlyar and along the entire borderline of the Terek River were formed into a body subordinate to the governor of Astrakhan. Into this corps were subsumed the Karbadian and Gorski jaeger battalions from the garrison of Kizlyar, and one battalion of the garrison of the town of Mozdok.

In 1779, this body was strengthened with the arrival at Astrakhan of the Selege, Tomsk, and Ladoga infantry regiments.

In the autumn of 1782, this body, having been further strengthened in the meantime, was named the Novolineyny Corps, and then soon renamed the Caucasus Corps. By then, the Corps consisted of 22 infantry battalions, 20 squadrons of dragoons, and four batteries of artillery (30 guns).

In early 1796, the Tsarina Catherine II, having decided to declare war on Persia, ordered that the Corps be strengthened with the addition of 4 infantry regiments, 3 light cavalry regiments, and one Cossack regiment.

The troops chosen to participate in the Persian Expedition of 1796 were organized into the Caspian Corps under Count Zubov. This Corps consisted of 6 grenadier battalions, 12 musketeer battalions, 7 jaeger battalions, and 45 cavalry squadrons. After Catherine's death, her successor Paul I halted military operations against Persia and withdrew all the troops stationed on the Caspian and in Georgia back into Russia.

In November 1796, an Imperial Order established a reorganization of all regiments. The troops were formed into 12 divisions, and soon renamed as Inspectorates. Troops stationed in the Caucasus became the 10th Caucasian Division. The Caspian Corps was disbanded and its troops reassigned to organizations which had been withdrawn into the internal provinces of Russia.

In 1801, at time of the accession to the throne of Tsar Alexander I, the troops in the Caucasian Inspectorate consisted of 15 infantry battalions, 20 squadrons of dragoons, and 5 artillery batteries.

== 1815 to 1857 ==
On December 21, 1815, by Imperial Order, the troops of the 19th and 20th Divisions, located on the Caucasian border, in Georgia, and in the Transcaucasian region in general, were formed into a separate Georgian Corps.

In early 1819, the commander in Georgia, General Aleksey Yermolov, requested a strengthening of the forces in the region. Tsar Alexander I did not feel able to do this on a permanent basis, but on April 19 sent ten regiments as a temporary reinforcement.

In August 1820, an Imperial Order was issued decreeing that some troops in the Georgia Corps be formed into the Separate Caucasus Corps.

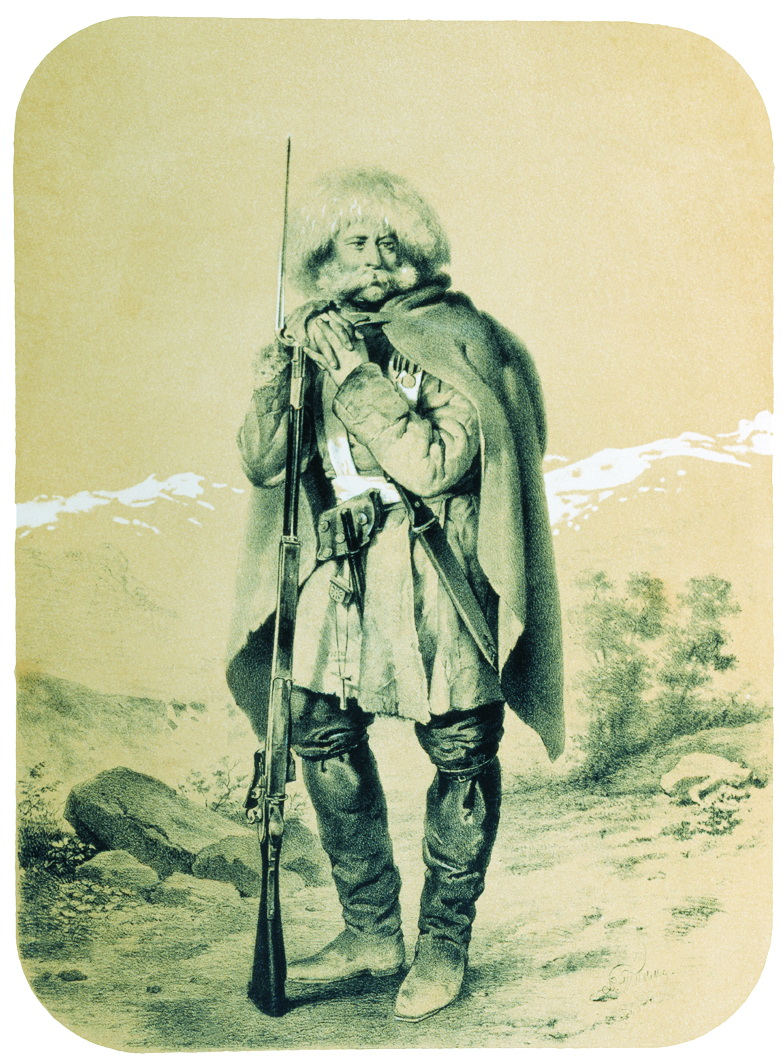
Soldier of the Separate Caucasian Corps, drawing by V. F. Timm, period 1851-1862.

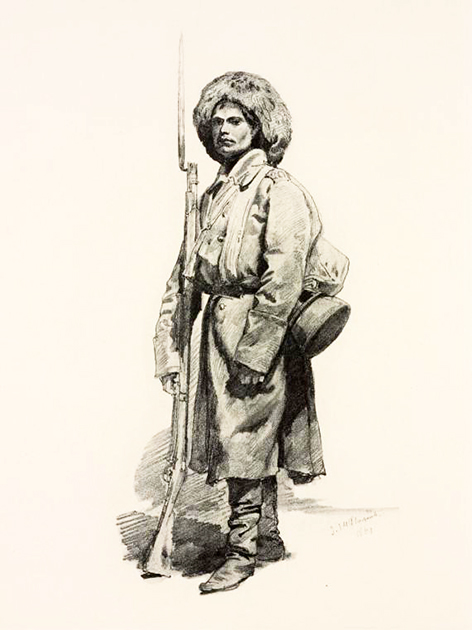
Private Kurinsky regiment. Drawing by T. Horschelt, period 1858-1861

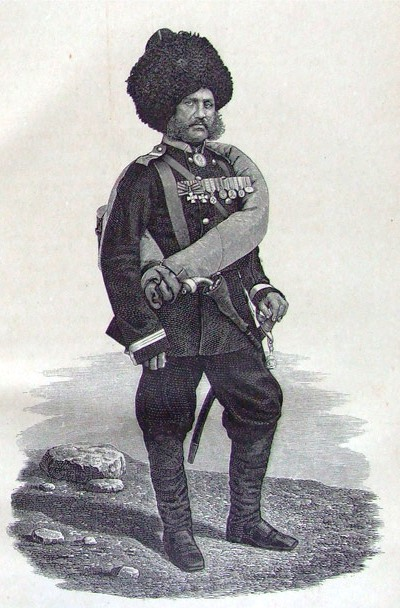
Officer of the Separate Caucasian сorps, by A. L. Zisserman.

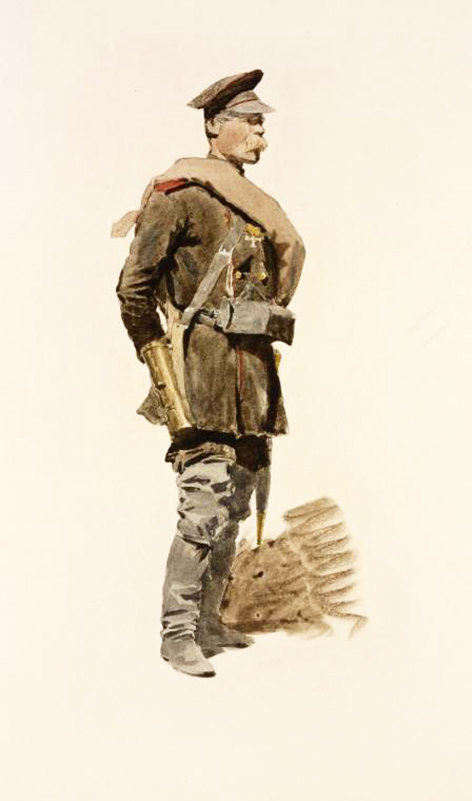
Artillery fireworker of the Separate Caucasian сorps

== 1857 to 1865: Caucasus Army ==
On December 6, 1857, the Caucasus Corps was renamed the Caucasus Army, and the post of Chief of the Caucasus Army General Staff was created.

In August 1865, the Caucasus Military District was created, and the general staff of the Caucasus Army was abolished, although the army was not formally abolished in name until 1881.

== Commanders ==
- Jacobi, Ivan Varfolomeyevich (appointed governor of Astrakhan in 1776)
- Knorring, Karl F. von (the first Russian commander in Georgia)
- Tsitsianov, Paul D.
- Tormasov, Aleksandr Petrovich
- Paulucci, Philip Osipovich
- Nikolay Rtishchev (1812-1816)
- Ermolov, Aleksei Petrovich (1816-1827)
- Paskevich, Ivan (1827-1831)
- Rosen, Gregory V. (1831-1838)
- Golovin, Evgeniy (1838-1842)
- Neidgardt, Alexander Ivanovich (1842-1844)
- Vorontsov, Mikhail Semenovich (1844-1855)
- Myravyov-Karsky, Nikolai Nikolaevich (1855-1856)
- Baryatinskiy, Alexander Ivanovich (1856-1857)

== See also ==
- Caucasus War
- Caucasus Military District, the successor organization to the formations described in this article.
