= Aşağımaden, Artvin =

Aşağımaden
- Village
- Location within Turkey
- Coordinates: 40°59′N 41°50′E
- Country: Turkey
- Province: Artvin
- District: Artvin
- Population (2021): 407
- Time zone: UTC+3 (TRT)

Aşağımaden is a village in the Artvin District, Artvin Province, Turkey. Its population is 407 (2021).
