= 1st Caucasus Army Corps =

Military formation of the Russian Empire

1st Cavalry Corps
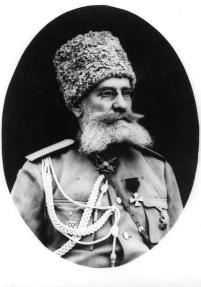
- Russian General of the Infantry Georgij Ėduardovič Bergmann (1916)
- Country: Russian Empire
- Allegiance: Imperial Russian Army
- Engagements: World War I

The 1st Caucasus Army Corps (Russian, 1-й Кавказский армейский корпус) was a military formation of the Russian Empire which existed between 1847 and 1918, including the period during World War I.

It was reformed on December 17, 1878. From November 1888 to March 1899, it was named the Caucasus Army Corps.

== History ==
In the first half of the 19th century the Caucasus Army Corps of the Russian Ground Forces formed the basis of the military management of the Armed Forces. The total number of corps varied from five in 1810 to twenty in 1825 (including eight separate corps: Guard, Grenadier, Caucasus, Finnish, Lithuanian, Orenburg, Siberian, and internal guard). In 1833 the number of corps was reduced to fifteen. For the period of the Eastern (Crimean) War (1855-1856) three new corps were created, and after its completion four corps were disbanded.

Army and cavalry corps were abolished from 1862 to 1864 during the military reforms of Dmitry Milyutin. However, advantages in combat readiness of corps organization led to their reconstruction from 1874 to 1879. Each corps included a directorate, two or three infantry division and one cavalry division, all with artillery.

On March 22, 1899 by the highest order the 20th and 39th infantry divisions, the 1st and 2nd Caucasus Cossack divisions, the 1st and 2nd Kuban Plastun battalions, the 20th and 39th artillery brigades, the 2nd and 5th Cossack batteries, the 20th and 39th flying artillery parks were allocated from the Caucasus army corps. This unit was called the 1st Caucasus Army Corps, which was formed on May 1, 1899.

== Composition ==
=== 1890 ===
В Кавказском армейском корпусе:

- one grenadier division
- two infantry divisions
- two Caucasus Cossack divisions
- two infantry Plastun battalions
- two batteries of the Kuban Cossack army

=== 1894 ===
- Staff
- 20th Infantry Division
  - 1st Brigade
    - 77th Tengin Infantry Regiment
    - 78th Navagin Infantry Regiment
  - 2nd Brigade
    - 79th Kura Infantry Regiment
    - 80th Kabardian Infantry Regiment
  - 20th Artillery Brigade
- 39th Infantry Division
  - 1st Brigade
    - 153rd Baku Infantry Regiment
    - 154th Derbent Infantry Regiment
  - 2nd Brigade
    - 155th Cuban Infantry Regiment
    - 156th Infantry Elisavetpol Regiment
  - 39th Artillery Brigade
- 1st Caucasus Rifle Brigade
  - 1st Caucasus Rifle Regiment
  - 2nd Caucasus Rifle Regiment
  - 3rd Caucasus Rifle Regiment
  - 4th Caucasus Rifle Regiment
  - 1st Caucasus Rifle Artillery Division
- Kuban Plastun Brigade
  - 1st Kuban Plastun General-Field Marshal Grand Duke Mikhail Nikolaevich battalion
  - 2nd Kuban Plastun Her Imperial Highness Grand Duchess Olga Nikolaevna battalion
  - 3rd Kuban Plastun battalion of His Imperial Highness Heir to the Tsarevich
  - 4th Kuban Plastun battalion of His Imperial Highness Grand Duke Georgy Mikhailovich
  - 5th Kuban Plastun battalion of His Imperial Highness Grand Duke Boris Vladimirovich
  - 6th Kuban Plastun His Majesty Battalion
- 1st Caucasus Cossack Division
  - 1st Brigade
    - 1st Kuban Regiment
    - 1st Uman Regiment
  - 2nd Brigade
    - 1st Khopersky Regiment
    - 1st Gorsko-Mozdok Regiment
  - 1st Caucasus Cossack Division
- 1st Caucasus Mortar-artillery Division
- Caucasus Spark Company
- 1st Caucasus Sapper Battalion

== Part of ==
- Russian Caucasus Army: 1913–1917

== Commanders ==
- Lieutenant General N. A. Kluyev: 1913–1914
- General Piechoty G. J. Bergmann: 1914–1915
- General Kawalerii P. P. Kalitin: 1915–1917
- Lieutenant General Vladimir Liakhov: 1917
