= Battle of Taif (1916) =

Coordinates: 21°16′N 40°25′E

- Part of the Arab Revolt of the Middle Eastern theatre of World War I
Date	10 June – September 23, 1916
Location	Ta’if, Hejaz Vilayet
Result	Arab victory

Belligerents
(Arab Revolt) Kingdom of Hejaz British Empire: Egypt	Ottoman Empire

Commanders and leaders
(Arab Revolt) Abdullah bin Hussein (Arab Revolt) Faajir bin Sheliweh al-'Atawi	(Ottoman Empire) Ahmed Tevfik Pasha

Strength
~7,000+ supported by British-supplied artillery	1,200–3,000 (military and civilian inhabitants)

Casualties and losses
Unknown	Most surrendered

The Battle of Taif was fought between Ottoman forces and Syed Hussien bin Ali Sharif of Mecca in 1916. The Ottoman Army was in Taif, with Syed's forces besieging the city and after many weeks siege and fiercest struggle Syed's forces were able to capture the Taif. After the fall of Mecca in July 1916 the fall of Taif was a major blow for Turks who were fighting in First World War against Britain. The British helped Syed Hussein's bin Ali's Forces by providing them with guns.
