= Arif Baytın =

Turkish politician (1874–1950)

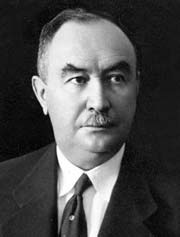

Member of the Grand National Assembly of Turkey
- President: Mustafa Kemal Atatürk

Personal details
- Born: 1874
- Died: February 6, 1950 (aged 75–76) Istanbul, Turkey
- Education: Ottoman Military College

Military service
- Allegiance: Ottoman Empire; Turkey
- Branch: Ottoman Army
- Commands: 29th Infantry Division
- Battles/wars: Greco-Turkish War (1897); Balkan Wars; World War I Turkish War of Independence

Ismail Arif Baytın (also known as Miralay Arif Bey) was an Ottoman Army officer and a Turkish politician. He was the commander of 29th Infantry Division at the Battle of Sarikamish.

== Biography ==
Baytın was a graduate of Ottoman Military College and served in the following positions: Greek Border Arbitration and Construction Command, 3rd Army Redif Squads Headquarters, Erkan-ı Harbiye District Governorate, Damascus War School Directorate and Ministry of Lessons, 3rd Army Military Officer's Office, 6th Army Corps Chief of Staff, Divan-ı Scholar Military Investigation Committee Member, 3rd Branch Directorate, 29th Division and Investigation and Classification Police Command, Muğla Transactions Assistant Director, Military Staff Historical War Department, Istanbul 6th Reconstruction and Settlement Zone Directorate and Inspectorate, Member of the Antalya Governorship, Ankara Aircraft Company Government Representative Office, Undersecretariat of the Ministry of Public Works, GNAT V. Term (By-term Election), VI. and VII. He first saw action during the Greco-Turkish War of 1897 and later he participated in the Balkan Wars defending Constantinople from the Bulgarian attack. He also commanded the Ottoman Army during World War I in the Caucasus campaign. After the First World War, he later went to Ankara and joined the Turkish War of Independence. He was married and had two children.
