= Şerif İlden =

Turkish politician

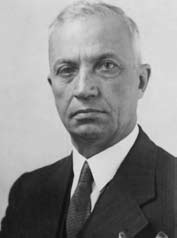

Member of the Grand National Assembly

Personal details
- Born: 1877 Veles, Ottoman Empire
- Died: 1952 (aged 74–75) Istanbul, Turkey

Mustafa Şerif İlden (1877, Veles – 1952, Istanbul) was a Turkish career officer, diplomat and far-right politician.

== Biography ==
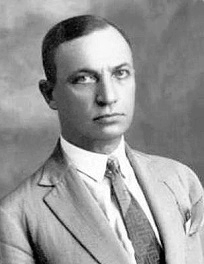
Şerif İlden in the 1920s

He was born in Veles. His father, Hüseyin Avni Bey, was a civil servant in Skopje. Şerif Bey graduated from the Manastır Military High School in 1891 and the Istanbul Field Artillery School in 1895. In the same year, he entered the Military Academy with the rank of lieutenant. When the Balkan Wars broke out, he was the Chief of Staff of the Western Army. On January 8, 1914, he was appointed as the Chief of Staff of the 9th Corps in Erzurum. He participated in World War I. He was taken prisoner by the Russians on the Sarıkamış Front on 29 January 1915. The life of captivity in Siberia lasted three years. In January 1918 he escaped to Constantinople. He retired on March 31, 1918. He supported the Turkish War of Independence by sending weapons and ammunition to the Turkish soldiers. After 1923, he held diplomatic positions between 1935 and 1939.
