= 57th Infantry Regiment (Ottoman Empire) =

Former Ottoman military unit

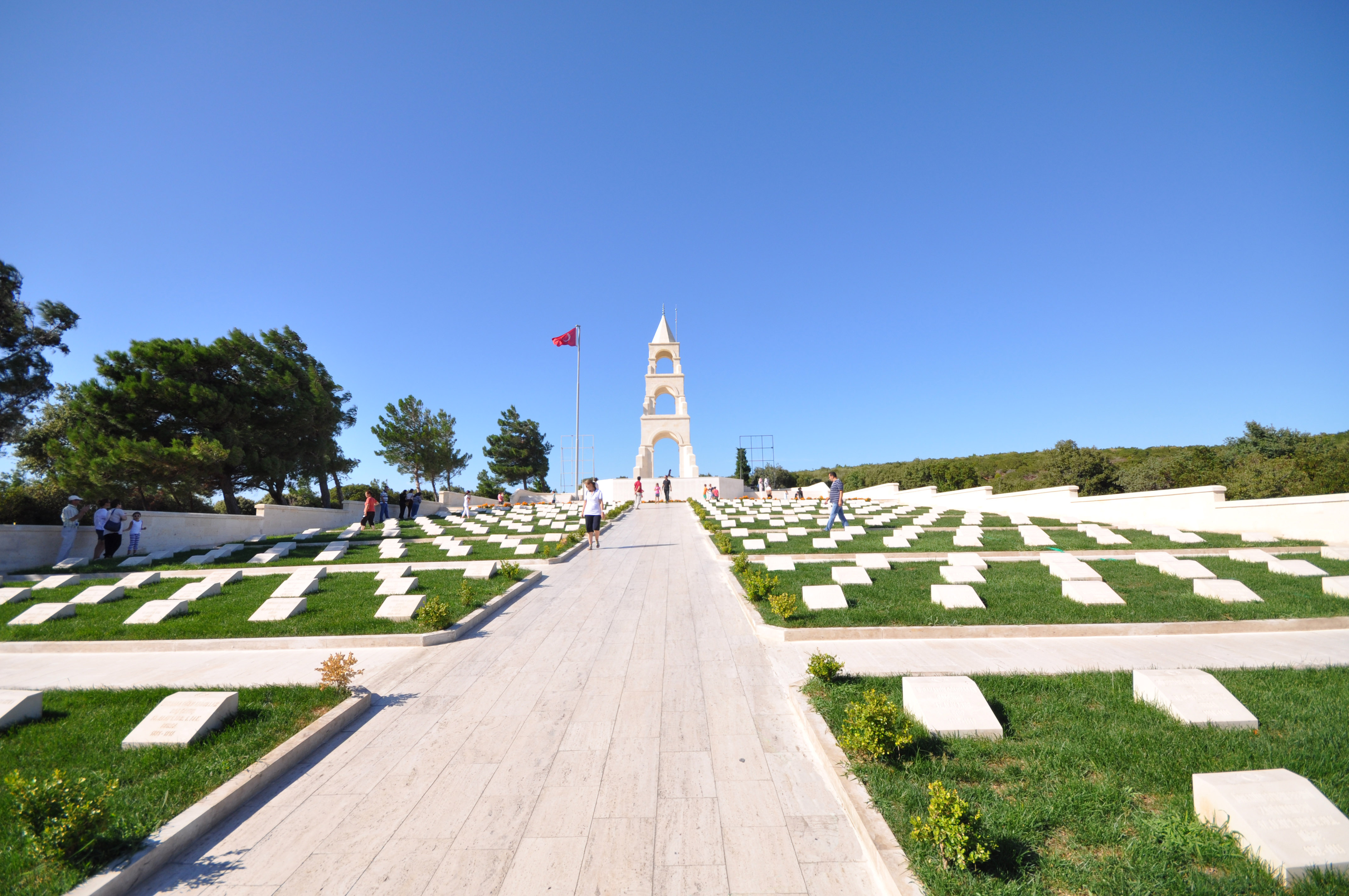
- The 57th Infantry Regiment Memorial on Gallipoli Peninsula
- Country: Ottoman Empire
- Branch: Ottoman Army
- Part of: 19th Infantry Division
- Engagements: Italo-Turkish War First Balkan War World War I: Battle of Galicia; Gallipoli Campaign; Landing at Anzac Cove; Sinai and Palestine campaign

Commanders
- Notable commanders: Kaymakam Hüseyin Avni

The 57th Infantry Regiment (Turkish: 57'nci Piyade Alayı or Elli Yedinci Piyade Alayı) or simply 57th Regiment (Turkish: 57 nci Alay or Elli Yedinci Alay) was a regiment of the Ottoman Army during World War I. In response to the landing at Anzac Cove of Australian and New Zealand forces on 25 April 1915 the 57th Regiment counterattacked, slowed the Allied advance and lost about half of its personnel. Mustafa Kemal later noted that the 57th Regiment was "a famous regiment this, because it was completely wiped out".

== History ==
=== Establishment ===
The 57th Infantry Regiment can trace its establishment back to either 9 December 1880 or 25 December 1892 depending upon the sources. It was formed as part of the 29th Brigade of the 15th Division. Its first commander was Colonel Mehmet Rıza from Istanbul who was soon after succeeded by Colonel Mehmet Izzet.

=== Italo-Turkish War and Balkan Wars ===
The regiment deployed to Tripoli with 71 officers and 1,642 non-commissioned officers and enlisted men in 1896. It participated as part of the 5th Tripoli Division in the Italo-Turkish War, which began on 29 September 1911. After the war ended in October 1912, the 57th Regiment was first sent to Acre in Palestine and assigned to the 8th Corps.

At the commencement of the First Balkan War while the 2nd Battalion was distributed to other units the rest of the regiment remained intact and was assigned to the 19th Infantry Division which was part of the VII Corps of the Vardar Army. Initially it was stationed at Bilaç ve Berana. At the commencement of the war the regiment was structured as follows:

Commanding officer: Colonel Sami

- 1st Battalion. Commanded by Major İsmail Hakkı
- 3rd Battalion. Commanded by Captain Mustafa Nuri

The regiment commenced wartime operations with 35 officers, 2,223 non-commissioned officers and enlisted men and 40 animals. It suffered 17 casualties. It participated in the Battle of Kumanovo on 23–24 October 1912 and the Battle of Monastir on 16 to 19 November 1912. Following the Ottoman defeat in the war the regiment returned to Istanbul.

=== World War 1 ===
Following the end of the Balkan wars the Ottoman army went through a major reorganization. During this process the 57th Regiment may have been disestablished as sources record the regiment as being established on 1 February 1915, in Tekirdağ as part of the 19th Division, which was being raised by Lieutenant Colonel Mustafa Kemal and receiving its regimental colours (sancak) on 22 February 1915.

On 23 February 1915, Major Hüseyin Avni succeeded Miralay Şemi Bey as commander of the regiment.

=== Gallipoli campaign ===
The regiment was training at Tekirdağ when in response to the perceived threats to the Dardanelles the III Corps of which the 19th Division was part was assigned the task of reinforcing the Gallipoli Peninsula. As a result, the 57th regiment received orders on the 21 February 1915 to transfer with the 19th Division to Gallipoli. On 25 February, the regiment arrived at Eceabat by steamship, though its battalions were missing their fourth companies. There was a request for the regiment to be assigned to the 5th Army, but Mustafa Kemal was successful in insisting that the 57th Regiment stay under his command.

By April 1915, the 19th divisional headquarters and divisional units were stationed on the Yeldegirmeni Plains near Bigalı, a small village on the Gallipoli Peninsula off to the east beyond the main ranges, while the actual regiments were encamped further south around Maltepe and Mersintepe. The regiment was then involved in training until 24 April.

The regiment was structured as follows at the commencement of the Gallipoli campaign:

Commanding officer - Kol Aghassi (Major) Major Hüseyin Avni.

- 1st Battalion. Commanded by Captain Ahmet Zeki (In response to the 1934 Surname Law his family adopted the surname "Soydemir").
- 2nd Battalion. Commanded by Captain Mehmed Ata (In response to the 1934 Surname Law his family adopted the surname "Ercikan").
- 3rd Battalion. Commanded by Captain Ali Hayri (In response to the 1934 Surname Law his family adopted the surname "Ariburuni").
- 57th Machine Gun company with four 7.65 mm Maxim MG09 machine guns, organized into two platoons and employed in pairs or supporting platoons.

The regiment had a strength of 49 officers, 3,638 non-commissioned officers and enlisted men with 377 animals, 2,288 rifles as well as its machine guns.

Upon landing at Anzac Cove the Allied attackers encountered Turkish soldiers of the No.2 battalion of the 27th Regiment who, after doing what they could, withdrew back over the ridges. The main Ottoman forces in the area had been held in reserve to see just where the British Empire troops were going to land on the peninsula. The first to respond to the news of the landing were the other two battalions of this regiment under the command of Kolağası (Lieutenant Colonel) Mehmed Şefik who advanced from their staging positions in the rear at Eceabat to meet up with the retreating No.2 battalion.

Already woken by the sounds of gunfire a report reached Mustafa Kemal at 5.20 am that an enemy force was scaling the heights at Ariburnu (ANZAC Cove). He ordered his whole division to prepare to march to the coast while he himself set off riding at the head of the 57th Regiment at 8.10 am. By about 9.30 am, Mustafa Kemal stood at Chunuk Bair with some of his officers. He could see the British warships and transports off Anzac Cove and also, coming rapidly up the hill towards him, a group of Ottoman soldiers who had been tasked with defending Hill 261 (Battleship Hill). They were out of ammunition and retreating. Mustafa Kemal stopped them, and asked them to take out their bayonets and lie down. This made the Anzacs climbing up the hill hesitate and lie down also. Although Mustafa Kemal had sent reports to the army and the Corps Command at Gallipoli, he received no reply.

Identifying that the Australian contingent was making for the high ground dominating the narrows, he immediately ordered the 2nd battalion under Mehmed Ata of the 57th to counterattack in the direction of Battleship Hill and as 1st battalion arrived he ordered it to support the counterattack from the south. The counterattack was successful and drove the Australian forward units under the command of Captain Eric W. Tulloch off Battleship Hill.

Mustafa Kemal then made contact with Şefik and took him under his command. He also used his initiative to order the rest of his division forward to join him. Meanwhile, he ordered the entire 57th Regiment to prepare to counterattack in coordination with Şefik's 27th Regiment. His order to the 57th Regiment read:

“I do not order you to attack, I order you to die! In the time which passes until we die, other troops and commanders can take our place”.

The first companies commenced the counterattack at around 11.30 am and was followed by the others after noon. The 1st battalion lost its way and was late joining the counterattack. During this action which was personally led by Hüseyin Avni the regiment sustained heavy losses over the course of the day but were able to successfully stabilize the right flank of the Turkish defences.

When Mustafa Kemal's 72nd Regiment arrived late in the day, he used it to reinforce the 57th's decimated line.

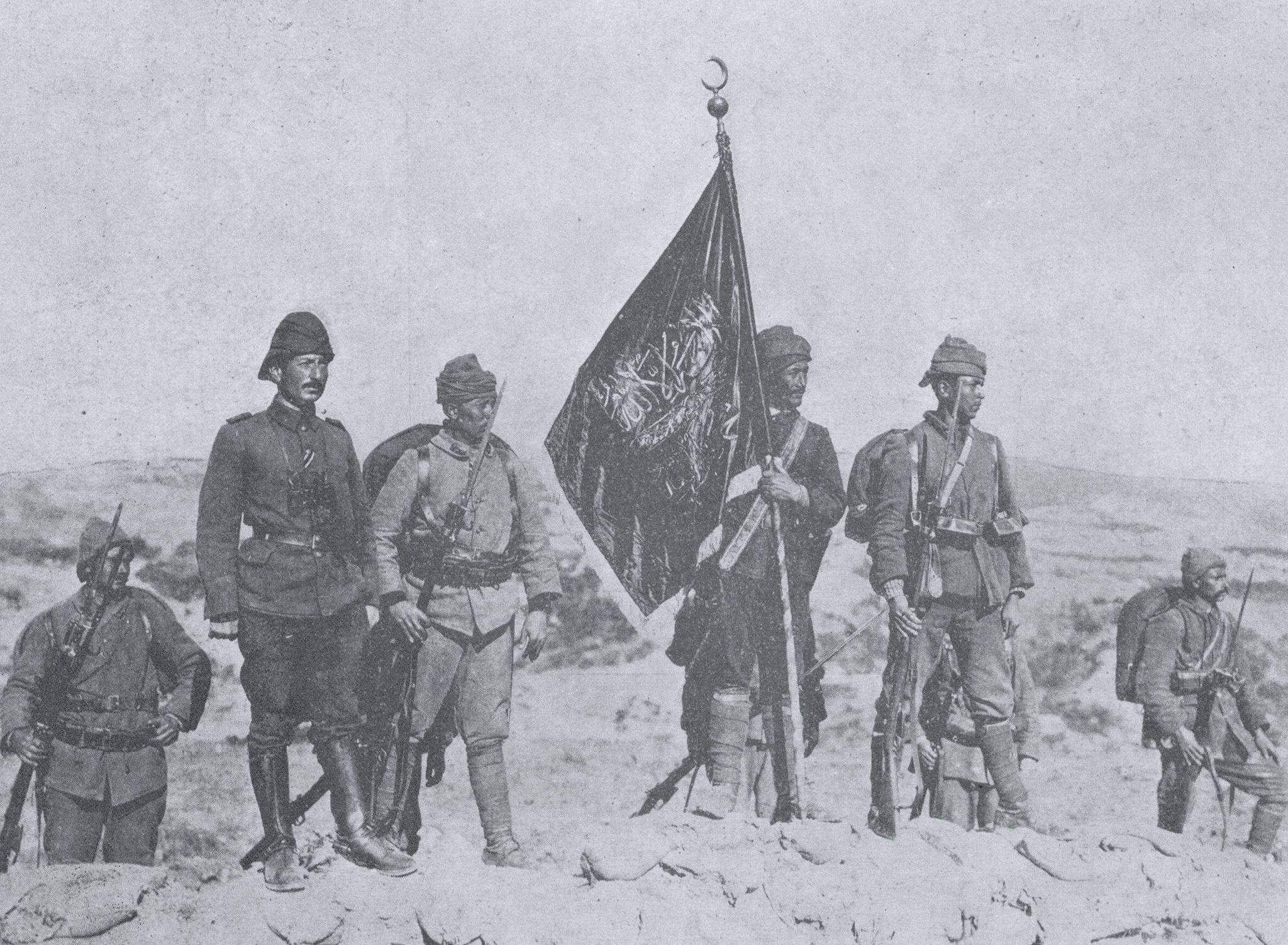
Hüseyin Avni and others at Gallipoli, 1915

The regiment, which suffered serious casualties between 25 April and 3 May, was reinforced with replacements. As the campaign turned into a trench war, the regiment was deployed around Merkeztepe-Bombastır and successfully defended this area until the Allied withdraw from Gallipoli. The regimental commander Hüseyin Avni, who was promoted to lieutenant colonel due to his success in the Arıburnu Battles, was killed on 13 August 1915, on the second day of Ramadan Feast, when a shell fell near the regiment headquarters in Kesikdere. He was succeeded on 24 August as commander of the regiment by Major Ali Hayri (Arıburun), who had been in the command of the 3rd battalion.

Over the course of the campaign the regiment lost 25 officers and 1,817 NCOs and enlisted men out of its initial strength of 49 officers and 3,638 NCOs and enlisted men.

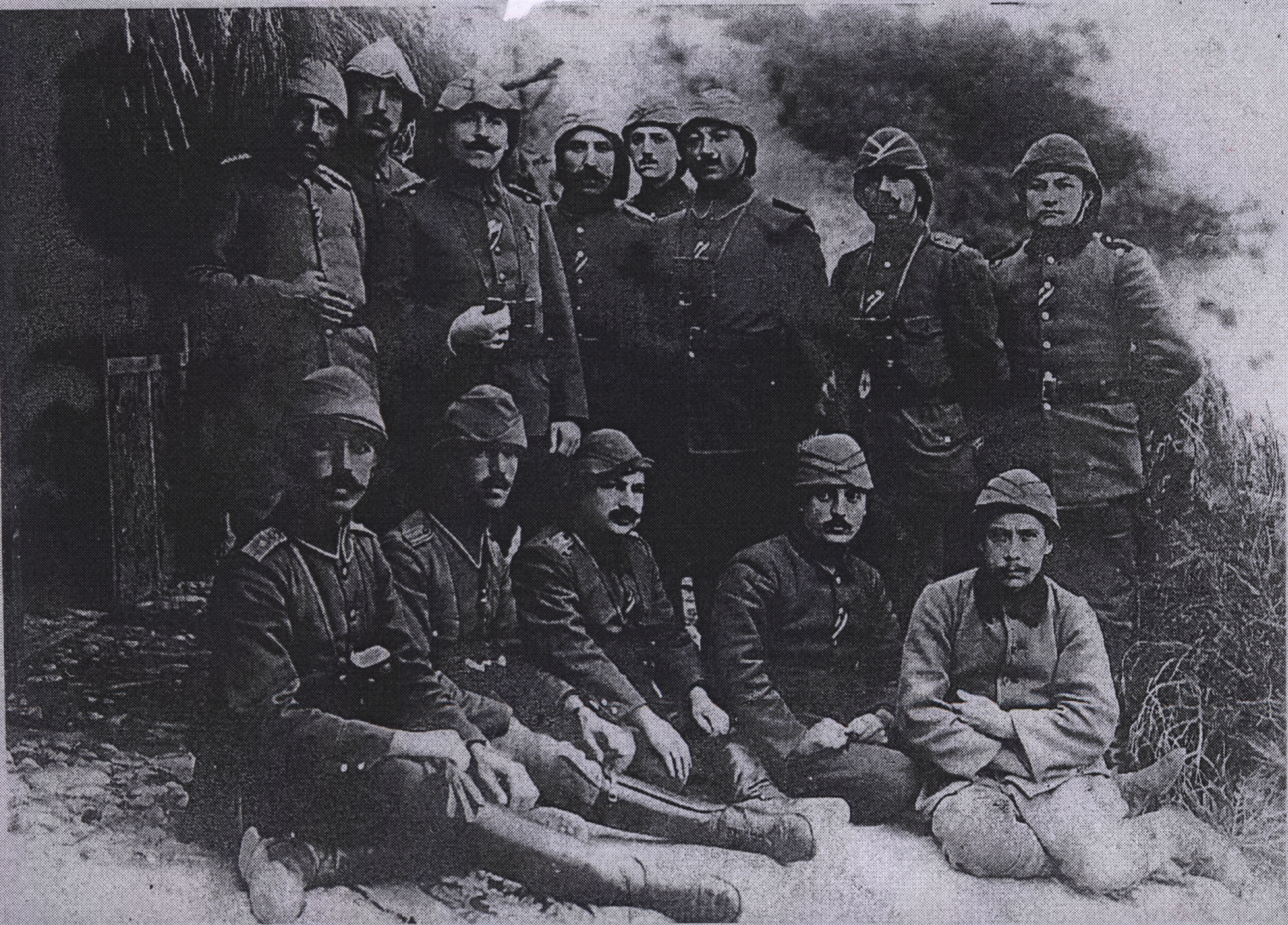
The 1st Battalion of the 57th Regiment with its commander Major Zeki Bey

=== Galicia ===
After the successful completion of the Gallipoli Campaign, the 19th Division including the 57th Regiment was assigned to the newly formed XV Corps. On 20 January 1916, the regiment were ordered to move towards Uzunköprü in Edirne Province.

On 22 July 1916, they boarded a train which took them through Plovdiv, Sofia and Niš, before they disembarked in Belgrade. After some rest, the regiment made its way to Zemlin in Austria-Hungarian Empire. They were quartered in the area mostly in private residences. On 21 August 1916, Russians began their Brusilov Offensive along the Galicia front which led to the positions occupied by the 57th Regiment being attacked on 11 September. Both sides suffered heavy casualties. Fighting continued through September and early October.

On 11 June 1917, after almost a year at the front the 57th Regiment was ordered back home.

Having come to Galicia with 54 officers and 2,741 men, the regiment left it having suffered 685 killed and 975 missing.

=== Sinai and Palestine campaign ===
After departing from Galicia the regiment reached the Bakırköy railway station on the outskirts of Istanbul on 23 June 1917 and established itself in tents near İncirli Çiftliği. The regiment's command structure was as follows:

Commanding officer - Major Hacı Mehmet Emin.

- 1st Battalion. Commanded by Captain Ömer Fevzi.
- 2nd Battalion. Commanded by Mehmet Salih.
- 3rd Battalion. Commanded by Captain Süleyman.

Together with the rest of the 19th Division the regiment departed Bakırköy for Haydarpaşa with 54 officers, 3,689 non-commissioned officers and enlisted men. Departing the Istanbul area on 8 July the regiment arrived in Aleppo on 16 July 1917. From there the regiment transferred to the army headquarters in Ayn-ı Tel and rested there until 29 July. On 24–25 August 1917 the regiment relocated to form with the 19th Division part of the Yildirim Army Group. On the night of 11–12 September 1917, they encountered Allied forces on the Oatar ridge near the villages of Akir, Al-Mugar and Karta and became involved in heavy combat. Combat continued on the ridges of Al-Mugar and Karta, in the vicinity of Akir, Ramle, Sheikh Munis, then around Kırmızıtepe, Cülcüliye, Kefer and Sürgüntepe. From 29 July 1917 the regiment was involved in fighting on the frontline between the villages of İkiztepe, Yüksektepe and Seferkasim Şemriye. The regiment subsequently suffered heavy casualties in the Battle of Nablus, which was part of the larger Battle of Megiddo. Its losses during this battle was such that on 23 September 1918 the regiment was considered destroyed and removed from the regiment list.

== Honours ==
The regiment was awarded the Gold and Silver Medals of Concession and War Medal by the Ottoman Sultan Mehmed V on 30 November 1915. these were attached to their regimental flag by the Sultan at a ceremony on 25 April 1916 while the regiment was locating to the Galicia Front.

== 57th Regiment Martyrs Mosque ==
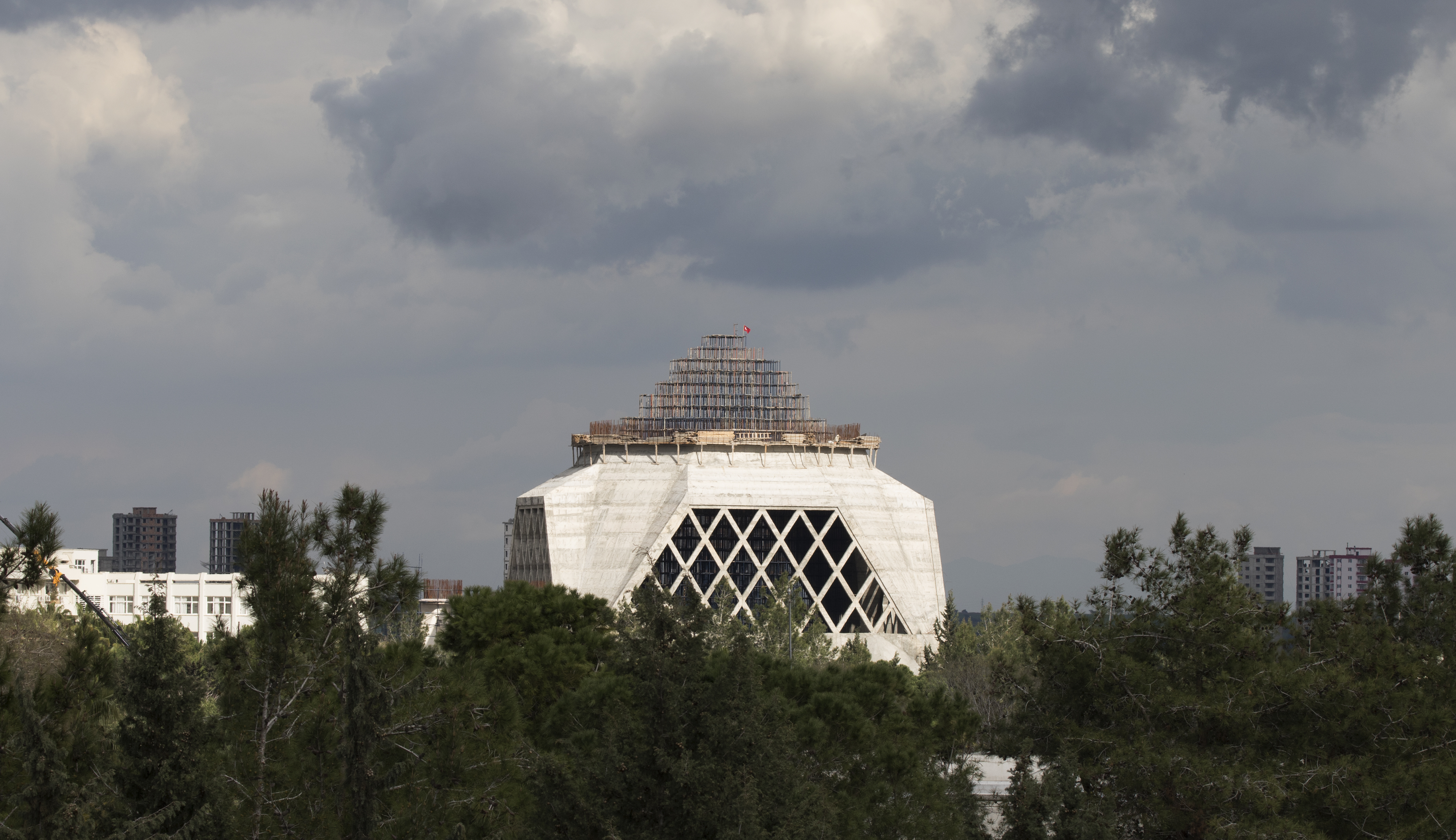
The 57th Regiment Martyrs Mosque under construction in 2016

In May 2014 construction started on the erection of a mosque on the grounds of the Facility of Theology of the Çukurova University in the city of Adana dedicated to the memory of the regiment. Known in Turkish as the “57. Alay Şehitleri Camii” completion was planned for May 2016 at a cost of 1,500,000 Turkish Lira. However construction was still underway as of April 2021.

== 57th Infantry Regiment Memorial ==
In 1992, the 57th Infantry Regiment Memorial which commemorates the men of the regiment who died at Gallipoli was constructed north of Quinn's Post on the lower slope of Baby 700 on top of a position known to the Anzacs as the Chessboard.

== 57th Regiment March ==
Partly in response to the increasing number of Australian and New Zealand youth on the battlefields for Anzac Day local Turkish university students organised a commemoration march in 2006. Originally known as the 57th Regiment March in the Track of Atatürk it has continued on a regular basis since then. It involves an eight-kilometre hike re-enacting the march of the 57th Regiment from the village at Bigali to the highlands of the battlefield. Within three years of the first march occurring there were 6,000 participants. As the march became more popular the Ministry of Youth and Sports assumed some control of the event and the government began funding the cost of travel and living expenses for its participants. It also oversees official registration and program co-ordination to cap attendance.

For the 2019 commemoration, a 104 metres (341 ft) long Turkish flag was carried by the marchers.

== Symphony ==
In 2012, the Turkish composer Can Atilla composed the original score of the Turkish war film Çanakkale 1915. This project generated some ideas for a second work, which eventually became his Symphony No. 2 in C minor, Gallipoli – The 57th Regiment, which was published in time for the 100th anniversary of the campaign. The composition premièred at the Peace Summit in Istanbul on 23 April 2015. The symphony has four parts. The first two movements of the symphony are in the form of a sinfonia concertante for solo cello and orchestra, the third is a funeral march while the fourth movement of the work is an elegy.

== Flag ==
A long-standing urban legend in Turkey claims that the flag of the 57th regiment was captured by Australian forces, who found it hanging on a tree branch above the dead body of the last surviving member of the regiment, and that it is now on display at the Melbourne Museum. The Museum and the Shrine of Remembrance in Melbourne both field many calls from the Turkish community about the flag around ANZAC Day each year, but assure all enquirers that they have never had the flag.

A rumour that started in the 1990s stated that the standard was held by the Australian War Memorial in Canberra. The Memorial does hold three Turkish infantry standards, all captured in Sinai/Palestine between 1916 and 1918 for the 46th Regiment, the 80th Regiment and an unnamed regiment but does not and never has held the 57th Infantry Regiment's standard. Nor are they aware that it was ever brought to Australia and does not know its current location.
