= Battle of Kumanovo =

1912 battle of the First Balkan War

- Part of the First Balkan War
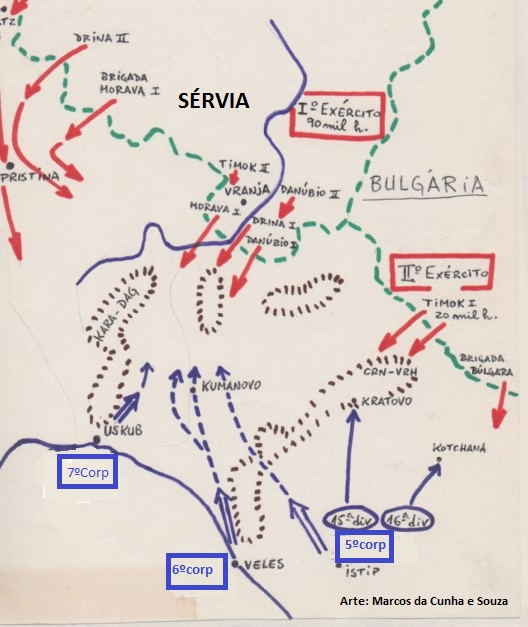
- First Balkan War. The Serbian Front (Serbia) The march of the armies before the battle of Kumanovo.
Date	23–24 October 1912
Location	Kumanovo district, Sanjak of Üsküp, Kosovo Vilayet, Ottoman Empire (now Kumanovo, North Macedonia)
Result	Serbian victory

Belligerents
Kingdom of Serbia	Ottoman Empire

Commanders and leaders
(Kingdom of Serbia) Radomir Putnik (Kingdom of Serbia) Prince Alexander (Kingdom of Serbia) Stepa Stepanović (Kingdom of Serbia) Božidar Janković	(Ottoman Empire) Zeki Pasha (Vardar Army) (Ottoman Empire) Fethi Pasha (VII Corps)

Units involved
(Kingdom of Serbia) 1st Army (Kingdom of Serbia) 2nd Army (Kingdom of Serbia) 3rd Army	(Ottoman Empire) V Corps (Ottoman Empire) VI Corps (Ottoman Empire) VII Corps

Strength
132,000 men 148 artillery pieces 100 machine guns	65,000 men 164 artillery pieces 104 machine guns

Casualties and losses
4,564 casualties (Note: Erickson argues that Serbian casualties may have been as high as 7,000 as the Serbs used their infantry in a manner similar to Japanese Banzai attacks.); 687 killed; 3,280 wounded; 597 missing	4,500 casualties (Note: Erickson estimates that Turkish casualties were 7,000 and argues against Serbian estimates that Turkish casualties were as high as 12,000); 1,200 killed; 3,000 wounded; 327 captured; 98 artillery pieces lost (Note: The Ottoman casualties don't include the significant number of soldiers who deserted during and after the battle.)
- c. 3,000 Albanians were massacred by the Serbian army between Kumanovo and Uskub

The Battle of Kumanovo (Serbian: Кумановска битка/Kumanovska bitka, Turkish: Kumanova muharebesi), on 23–24 October 1912, was a major battle of the First Balkan War. It was an important Serbian victory over the Ottoman army in the Kosovo Vilayet, shortly after the outbreak of the war.

After this defeat, the Ottoman army abandoned the major part of the region, suffering heavy losses in manpower (mostly due to desertions) and in war materiel.

== Background ==
The objective of the Royal Serbian Army plan was to destroy the Ottoman army in a decisive battle before the Ottomans could complete the mobilisation and concentration of forces. The Serbian operation plan assumed that the main Ottoman force would be deployed defensively in the valley of Vardar and on the strategically important plateau of Ovče Pole. The Serbian Commander-in-Chief was General Radomir Putnik. The aim was to double envelop the Ottoman army by using three armies:

- First Army, under Crown Prince Alexander, composed of five infantry and one cavalry division (132,000 men), was deployed in the area around Vranje, with the task to attack the enemy frontally.
- Second Army, under Stepa Stepanović, composed of one Serbian and one Bulgarian division (74,000 men), deployed in the area around Kyustendil, was assigned to the easternmost attack, with the objective of attacking the right flank of the enemy.
- Third Army, under Božidar Janković, composed of four infantry divisions and one infantry brigade (76,000 men), deployed in two groups, the first one at Toplica and the second one at Medveđa, was assigned to the westernmost attack, with the task to take Kosovo and then move south to attack the left flank of the enemy.
- Smaller units were sent to take Sandžak.

According to the initial Ottoman plan, created by Prussian field marshal Colmar Freiherr von der Goltz, the Ottoman forces in Macedonia would stay in defense and, if necessary, retreat to Albania. The decisive battle would take place in Thrace, versus the Bulgarian army. However, Nazim Pasha, the newly appointed commander-in-chief of the Ottoman army, decided to surprise the Serbs by taking an offensive in Macedonia. The plan also included the offensive in Thrace. His goal was to win initial battles against the Balkan League, hoping that the Great Powers would intervene and stop the war.

The Ottoman mobilisation in Macedonia was slow, and the Ottoman Vardar Army, led by Zeki Pasha, had little more than a half of its manpower mobilised when the war started. The army was composed of:

- V Corps, under Said Pasha, composed of 4 divisions (32,000 men), deployed in the area around İştip (Štip).
- VI Corps, under Cavit Pasha, composed of two divisions (6,000 men), deployed in the area around Veles.
- VII Corps, under Fethi Pasha, composed of three divisions (19,000 men), deployed in the area around Kumanovo.
- Smaller units in Kosovo.

== Prelude ==
Even before the war was declared, border skirmishes occurred. On the 15 October, the scouts of the Toplica group of the Third Army, Serbian guerrillas (Chetniks) acted on their own and attacked Ottoman forces, despite incomplete Serbian mobilization. The Ottomans counterattacked, but they were stopped by the Morava Division II. The fighting on the border lasted until 19 October when the Ottomans were forced to retreat. On 21 October the entire Third Army began its advance and on 22 October, without serious resistance, entered Pristina.

On 18 October, the Bulgarian 7th Rila Infantry Division of the Second Army started its advance towards Gorna Dzhumaya, while the rest of the army advanced towards the village of Stracin and captured it on 21 October.

On 20 October the First Army received the order of Chief of Staff Radomir Putnik to set out towards Kumanovo, in order to push out Ottoman detachments in the way, and then join up with the Second and Third Armies and move to Ovče Pole where a big battle with the main Ottoman army was anticipated. The 2nd Infantry Regiment of the Morava Division fought and dispersed Muslim Albanian units and then entered the town of Preševo from where the Ottoman garrison had left in a hurry. The First Army crossed the border on 20 October and in the evening of 22 October reached the outskirts of Kumanovo.

At the other side, as soon as his forces were deployed, Zeki Pasha decided to take the offensive towards Kumanovo. In the evening of 22 October, the Ottoman Vardar Army gathered in the valley of Pčinja River. While Zeki Pasha had the precise information about the strength and disposal of the Serbian forces, the Serbian command did not realise that the battle with the main Ottoman force would start the very next morning. Not expecting the attack, the Serbian forces did not fortify their positions, which were topographically strong. Still, only two out of five Serbian infantry divisions were deployed in the front echelon – Danube Division I on the left wing, with the Cavalry Division behind it, and Morava Division I on the right wing. The left flank was particularly vulnerable, because Srtevica, the important topographic object, was defended by local Muslim irregulars.

During the night of 22–23 October, the Ottoman VI Corps 17th Infantry Division and Monastir Infantry Division crossed Pčinja and took the position in the Ottoman centre, on the hill of Zebrnjak. The main forces of V Corps 13th Infantry Division and İştip Infantry Division remained on the left bank of Pčinja, forming the right of the Ottoman's which was acting as a reserve and protecting the route from Stracin, while the main forces of VII Corps 19th Infantry Division and Üsküb Infantry Division were on the left side.

== Battle ==
=== 23 October ===
Map of the battle on 23 October

The morning of 23 October was foggy, and reconnaissance could not be performed properly. On the Serbian left flank, the observers noticed the troops of the Ottoman 17th Infantry Division in movement, but mistook them for the Ottoman battery withdrawing from Stracin. Troops of the Serbian 18th regiment of Danube Division I, which moved forward to capture it, were pushed back, as well as the reconnaissance forces of the Serbian Cavalry Division.

Observing the retreat of these Serbian units, Zeki Pasha concluded that the Serbian left wing was weak. Since there were no actions of the Second Army from Stracin, he decided to attack. Around 11:00, with artillery support, V and VI Corps attacked the positions of Danube Division I. Soon, the Ottoman 13th and 17th Infantry divisions forced the Serbian 18th regiment to retreat in disorder, but, instead of continuing the attack, Zeki Pasha waited for the arrival of İştip Infantry Division from the rear to use this division to attack the Serbian flank and rear. That enabled the Serbian 7th regiment to aid the wavering 18th regiment and to consolidate a defense. Soon after that, the Serbian 8th regiment arrived, and 7th regiment was able to move to the left flank and reinforce the defense of Srtevica, which was endangered by an attack by the İştip Infantry Division. On the right flank of Danube Division I, its 9th regiment halted the advance of the weakened Monastir Infantry Division.

Around 12:00, VII Corps started its attack on the positions held by Morava Division I. However, Serbian infantry and artillery were already deployed for combat, as the artillery fire from the east suggested that the battle had started. After the initial Ottoman progress, the Serbian counterattack pushed them back to their starting positions where they were kept at bay by the well organised Serbian artillery fire until the end of the day.

The Serbian rear echelon divisions (Danube Division II on the left, Drina Division I in the centre and Timok Division II on the right) and the army artillery were not informed about the combat operations. They remained in the rear, without participating in the first day of the battle. The First Army command did not receive precise information about the battle and did not have any influence on the actual combat. Despite these facts, the Ottoman attack on 23 October was unsuccessful, mostly thanks to "the high devotion of (Serbian) troops and lower officers".

=== 24 October ===
Map of the battle on 24 October

Uninformed about the situation in the field, the First Army command did not realise that the attack of the main Ottoman forces had occurred, as those forces were expected on Ovče Pole. Assuming that the Ottoman units north of Kumanovo were merely forward detachments, it ordered the troops to continue their advance towards south, as previously planned. After midnight, it received a report from Danube Division I which stated that the division was attacked by the strong enemy forces and suffered heavy casualties, but at that moment it was too late for any change of orders.

On the other side, Zeki Pasha decided to continue the attack with the hope that his forces would be able to achieve victory on the following day.

The Ottoman attack on their right wing started around 5:30. VI Corps was assigned to tie up as many enemy forces as possible by attacking from the front, while Štip Infantry Division was again assigned to flank attack. Danube Division I again had to withstand heavy pressure, but around 10:00 parts of Danube Division II arrived from the rear and strengthened the defense. At the same time, Cavalry Division moved to the left bank of Pčinja and slowed the advance of Ottoman forces towards Srtevica. Around 12:00, parts of Danube Division II reinforced the defense of Srtevica, definitely stopping the advance of the Ottoman right wing.

On the left Ottoman wing, a lot of reservists from Üsküb Infantry Division had deserted during the night, upon hearing that the Third Army had captured Pristina and that it was marching towards Skopje. Still, at 5:30, VII Corps started the attack. However, Morava Division I counterattacked at 6:00 and with the arrival of Timok Division II from the rear they forced the entire Ottoman left wing to retreat.

Around 9:30, Drina Division II from the rear echelon of the First Army arrived to the front and attacked the Ottoman centre. Around 11:00, Monastir Infantry Division started to retreat. The commander of VI Corps managed to temporarily halt the Serbian advance by using his last reserves, but in the repeated attack around 13:00, Drina Division I captured Zebrnjak, the main object in Ottoman defense, and forced 17th Infantry Division to retreat. With Üsküb Infantry Division and Monastir Infantry Division already retreating, the battle was resolved. At 15:00, Morava Division I entered Kumanovo.

Ottoman forces retreated in disorder: VII and parts of VI Corps towards Skopje and V and parts of VI Corps towards Štip and Veles. Serbian troops missed the chance to pursue them.

== Aftermath and legacy ==
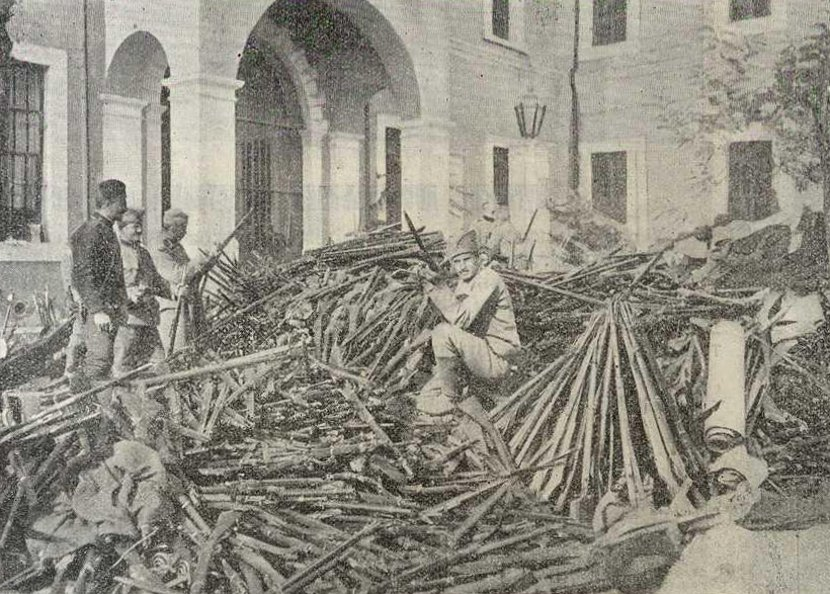
Serbian soldiers with heaps of Ottoman weapons after the battle

The Ottoman Vardar Army fought the battle according to plan, but despite this, suffered a heavy defeat. Although Zeki Pasha operationally surprised the Serbian command by his sudden attack, the decision to act offensively against the superior enemy was a grave error which determined the outcome of Battle of Kumanovo. On the other side, the Serbian command started the battle without plans and preparations, and missed the chance to pursue the defeated enemy and effectively end the operations in the region, although it had the fresh troops of the rear echelon available for such action. Even after the end of battle, the Serbian First Army still believed that it had fought against weaker Ottoman units and that the main enemy forces were on to Ovče Pole. Živojin Mišić stated that General Putnik believed that the Vardar army still had the ability to fight a battle at Ovče Pole even after its defeat at Kumanovo.

Nevertheless, the Battle of Kumanovo was a decisive factor in the outcome of the war in the region. The Ottoman plan for an offensive war had failed, and the Vardar Army was forced to abandon much territory and lost a significant number of artillery pieces without the possibility to reinforce, because the supply routes from Anatolia were cut.

The Vardar Army was not able to organise the defense on Vardar River and was forced to abandon Skopje, retreating all the way to Prilep. The First Army advanced slowly and entered Skopje on 26 October. Two days later, it was strengthened by Morava Division II, while the rest of the Third Army was sent to Western Kosovo and then through northern Albania to the Adriatic coast. The Second Army was sent to aid the Bulgarians in the Siege of Adrianople, while the First Army was preparing for an offense towards Prilep and Bitola.

The importance of the battle was seen in the aftermath, when Skopje surrendered and the Ottoman army redirected towards Bitola, leaving the Serbian army holding firm in conquered territory. The battle is regarded the most notable of the First Balkan War, as it boosted the morale and influenced the further course of the war.

== Sources ==
- Erickson, Edward J. (2003). Defeat in Detail: The Ottoman Army in the Balkans, 1912-1913. Praeger. ISBN 978-0275978884.
- Lazarević, Milutin D. (1928). Наши ратови за ослобођење и уједињење. Књ. 1, Српско-турски рат 1912. године. Српска књижевна задруга.
- Mišić, Živojin (1985). Моје успомене [My Memories] (in Serbian). Belgrade: BIGZ.
- Radonjić, Ivana (2012). "ГВОЗДЕНИ ПУК У КУМАНОВСКОЈ БИЦИ [The Iron Regiment in the Battle of Kumanovo]". In Lekić, Dragan R. (ed.). Други пешадијски пук „Књаз Михаило “–Гвоздени пук у Ослободилачким ратовима 1912–1918. године. Историјски архив Топлице - Прокупље. pp. 29-.
- Ratković, Borislav; Đurišić, Mitar; Skoko, Savo (1972). Србија и Црна Гора у балканским ратовима 1912-1913 [Serbia and Montenegro in the Balkan Wars of 1912–1913] (in Serbian). БИГЗ.
