= 57th Infantry Regiment Memorial =

Turkish war memorial

Coordinates: 40°14′26″N 26°17′33″E

The 57th Infantry Regiment Memorial is a Turkish war memorial commemorating the men of the Ottoman 57th Infantry Regiment who died during the Gallipoli campaign.

The battles at Gallipoli took place during an eight-month campaign fought by British Empire and French forces against the Ottoman Empire in an attempt to force Turkey out of the war and to open a supply route to Russia through the Dardanelles and the Black Sea.

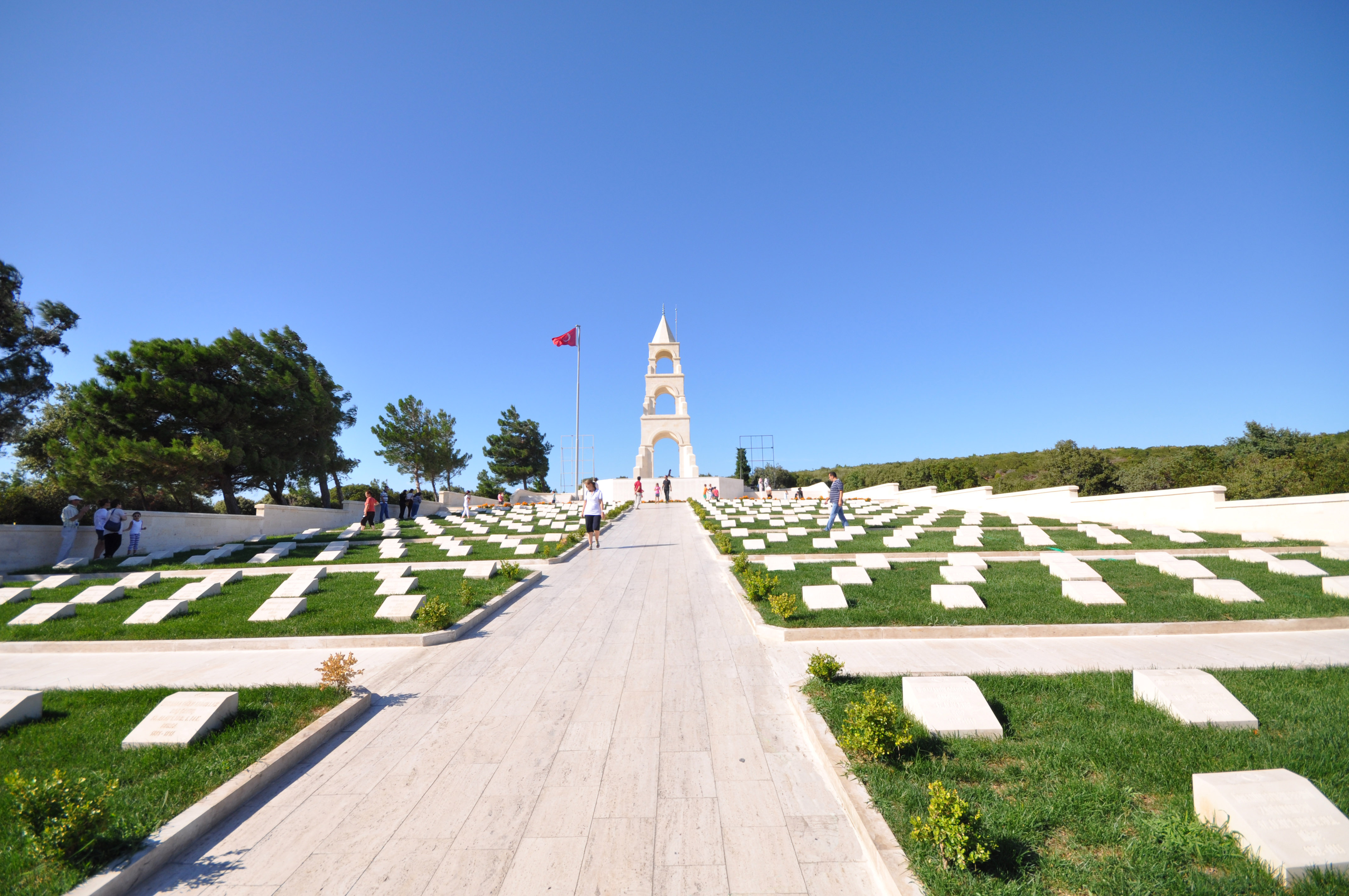
The 57th Infantry Regiment Memorial on Gallipoli Peninsula

== Background ==
The 57th Infantry Regiment was a unit of the 19th Division. Together with the 27th Infantry Regiment it was the first to respond following the Landing at Anzac Cove on 25 April 1915. As it prepared to counterattack on the first day, the 19th Division commander, Staff Lieutenant-Colonel Mustafa Kemal famously ordered the regiment:

“I do not order you to attack, I order you to die! In the time which passes until we die, other troops and commanders can take our place”.

The regiment slowed the Allied advance and lost about half of its personnel. Mustafa Kemal later noted that the 57th Regiment was "a famous regiment this, because it was completely wiped out".

== Description ==
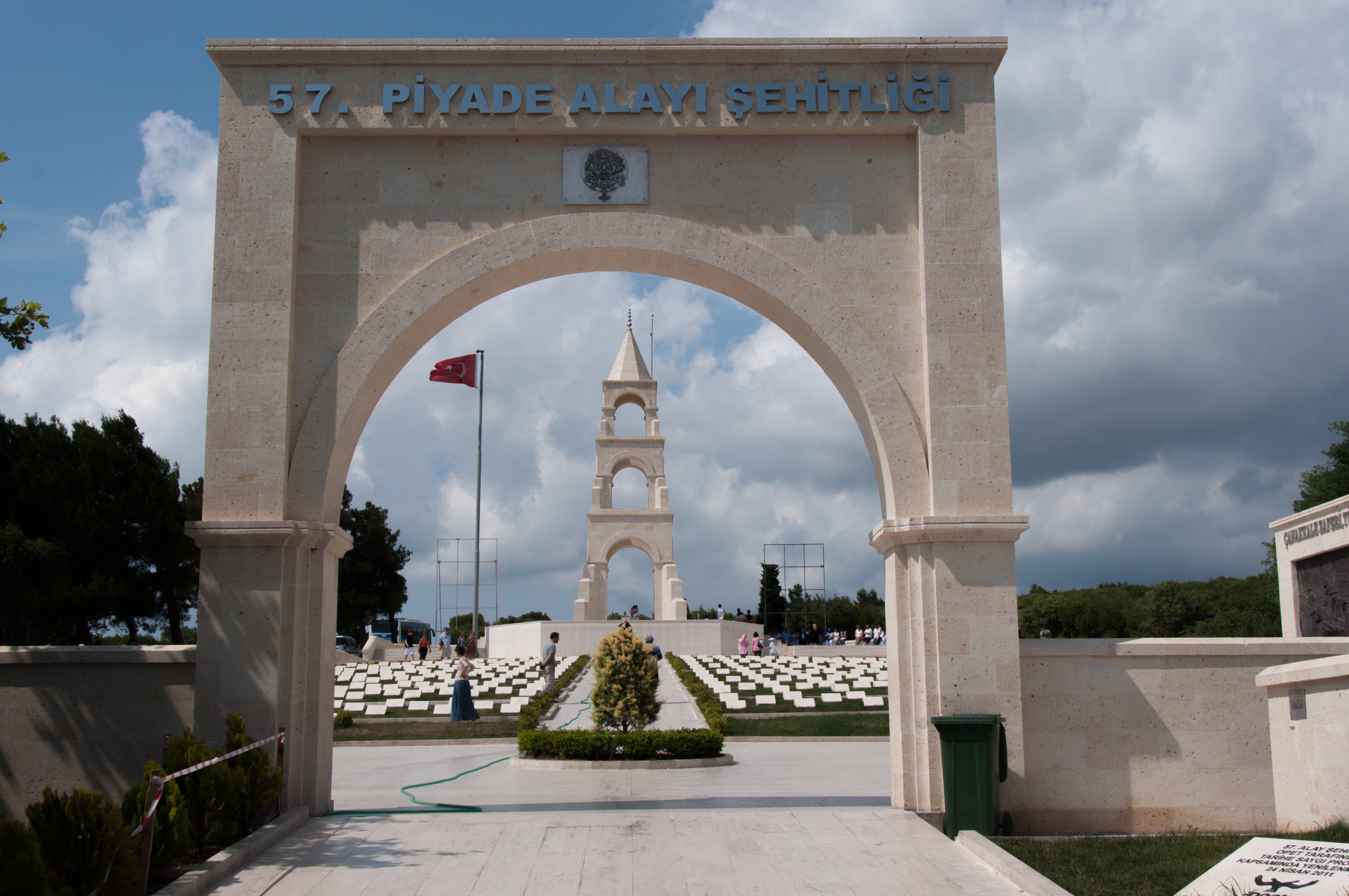
The entrance to the Memorial to 57th Ottoman Infantry Regiment

The memorial is located on the eastern side of the Kabatepe-Conkbayırı road, on top of a position at the southern ends of Kılıçbayır (Sword Sur) and Edirne Sirti (Mortar ridge) which the ANZAC soldiers called the "Chessboard" because of the way that the trenches criss-crossed over it. Designed by architect Nejat Dinçel it was officially opened on 10 December 1992 by the Turkish Minister of Culture. The complex contains a three-storey memorial tower, the cemetery, a "namazgah" (outdoor prayer platform), a "sadirvan" (fountain) and a large statue of a Turkish soldier. It is mainly constructed of "Kevser Stone", which features in Seljuk and Ottoman caravanserais.

On the eastern wall of the cemetery is a 45m^{2} bas-relief created by the sculptor Metin Yurdanur, which depicts the regiment’s counterattack on the 25 April. The complex was damaged in the forest fire on 25 July 1994, it was repaired and reopened to the public on 11 November 1994.

In 1994 a statue of the last Turkish Gallipoli survivor, Hüseyin Kaçmaz, with his granddaughter, were added following his death.

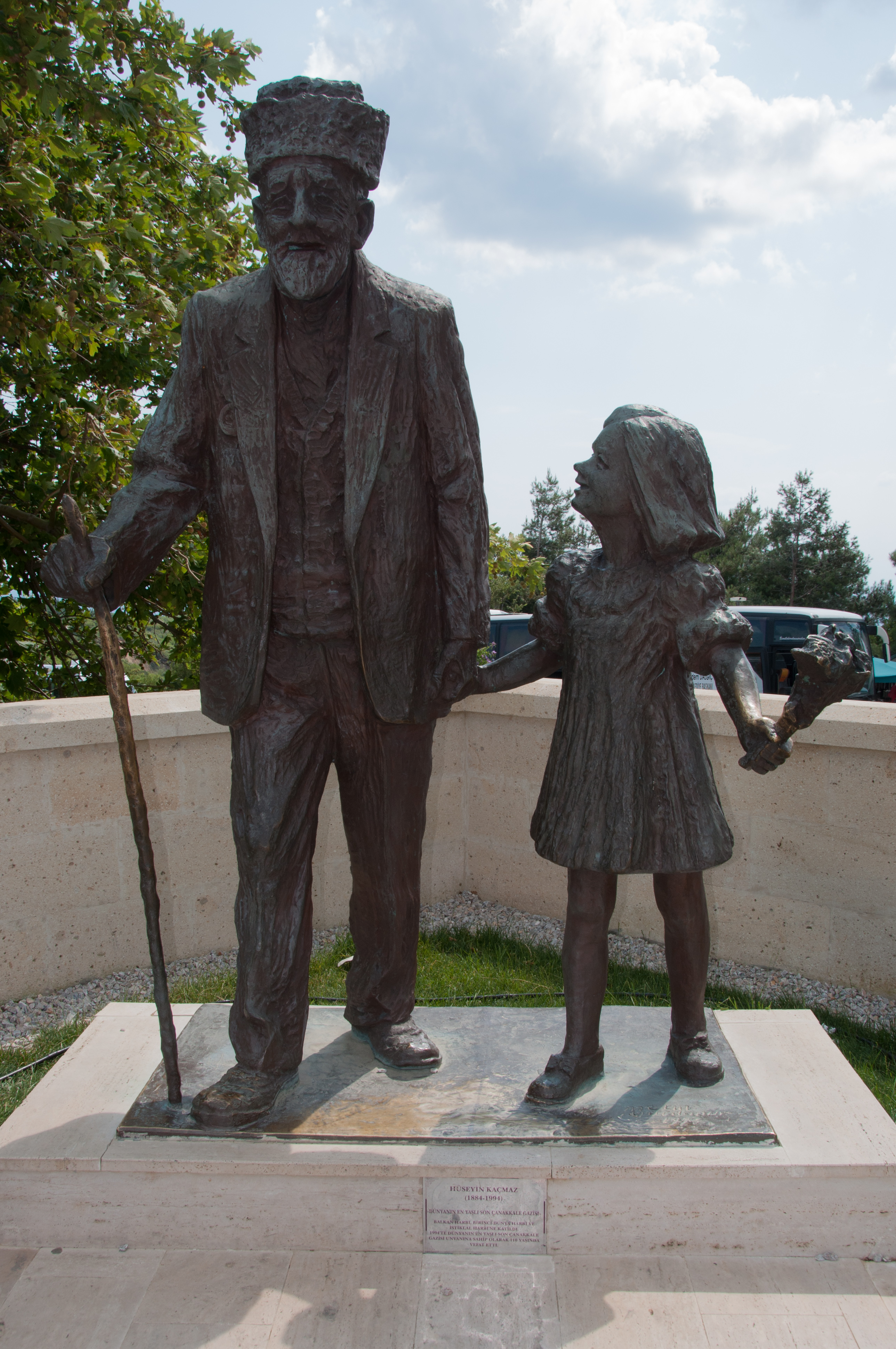
Hüseyin Kaçmaz with his granddaughter

The complex was restored and reopened to the public on 18 March 2011. The largely symbolic cemetery contains the names of many servicemen randomly selected to be inscribed on headstones or plaques on the walls. According to a sign at the site, the names of 1,817 soldiers who lost their lives are remembered, including 25 officers. Among those buried in the cemetery is the Greek doctor of the regiment, Captain Dimitroyati from Istanbul and the Imam of the regiment, Hasan Fehmi from Konya. The grave of Lieutenant Colonel Hüseyin Avni, the commander of the regiment, is located at a separate location.

== Remains found during construction ==
During the construction of the complex the remains of two soldiers were found embracing each other, together with their pistol’s canteens, Identity tags and an amulet. From the identification tags and an amulet found on one of the bodies they were identified as Captain L.J. Walters (“Woiters” in the Turkish version) of the British Army and, First Lieutenant Mustafa Asım from Erzincan, the commander of the 6th company of the 57th Regiment. Their bodies together with their identification tags and amulet were subsequently reburied in 1993 at the place where they were first found in the northern part of the cemetery, right in front of the monument.

To date no trace of an Allied officer with the name of Walters has been found in the CWGC records for this area. Of the 50 burials under the name “Walters” in 1915 only two were for officers and these were not at Gallipoli. However a Lieutenant Leslie John Waters of the 15th Australian Imperial Forces was killed on 27 April 1915 and buried at Quinn’s Post. Doubts have been cast on this story.
