= Zeki Pasha =

Field marshal (Müşir) of the Ottoman Army

Zeki Pasha 1299 (1883) Sv.
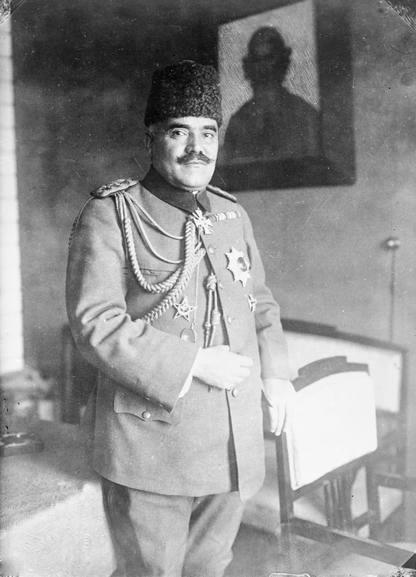
- Zeki Pasha, in January 1918.
- Born: 1862; Aleppo, Ottoman Empire
- Died: 1943 (aged 80–81); Istanbul, Turkey
- Military career
- Allegiance: Ottoman Empire
- Branch: Ottoman Army
- Service years: 1883–1923
- Rank: Field marshal
- Nickname: Halepli Zeki (Zeki from Aleppo)
- Commands: Vardar Army, 2nd Army, 4th Army
- Conflicts: Greco-Turkish War (1897); Italo-Turkish War; Balkan Wars; World War I
- Other work: Private representative of Sultan Mehmed V in Berlin

Zeki Pasha (Turkish: Zeki Paşa; 1862–1943), known as Mehmet Zeki Baraz Kolaç Kılıçoğlu after the 1934 Surname Law, was an Ottoman Balkan Wars and World War I field marshal of the Ottoman Army. He was of Circassian descent.

== Career ==
He graduated from the Ottoman Military Academy in 1883 and the Staff College in 1887. As his sister was one of the favourite wives of Sultan Abdul Hamid II, Zeki Pasha had a direct link with the Palace and was much trusted by the Sultan. As Commander of the IV Corps he was responsible for the tribal Hamidiye cavalry. In 1894, he was decorated for his participation during the Sassoun massacre. During the massacres, he reportedly stated, "not finding any rebellion we cleared the country so none should occur in the future."

In 1912–1913, he was commander of the Vardar Army during the First Balkan War. Following the orders of Nazim Pasha, Chief of Staff of the Ottoman Army, Zeki Pasha initiated the Battle of Kumanovo against Serbia.

His failure to emplace key artillery hindered the forces under his command and led to their defeat at Kumanovo. During the frantic Ottoman retreat from Kumanovo, a disgruntled Ottoman soldier attempted to assassinate him, contributing to the panic. The Vardar Army; consisting of the VII Corps commanded by Fethi Pasha, the VI Corps commanded by Djavid Pasha and the V Corps commanded by Kara Said Pasha, all under Zeki Pasha's command, retreated to Monastir (present day: Bitola) after the defeat at Kumanovo.

Zeki Pasha established a strong defensive position on the Oblakovo heights northwest of Monastir prior to the battle. However, during the Battle of Monastir, Serbian artillery and infantry managed to defeat the Ottomans. Fethi Pasha was among the casualties.

On 21 November 1914, he was assigned the Ottoman liaison officer to Kaiser Wilhelm II and was sent to German Empire. The German General Ludendorff described him as a “noble Ottoman and reliable friend of Germany, an amazingly discreet and good advocate of his army.” He led the Ottoman delegation that signed the armistice with Russia on 15 December 1917. After the armistice, he returned to Constantinople and served as the Ottoman Chief of General Staff between 23 October 1920 and 1 November 1922. He retired from the army in 1923 and settled in Istanbul.

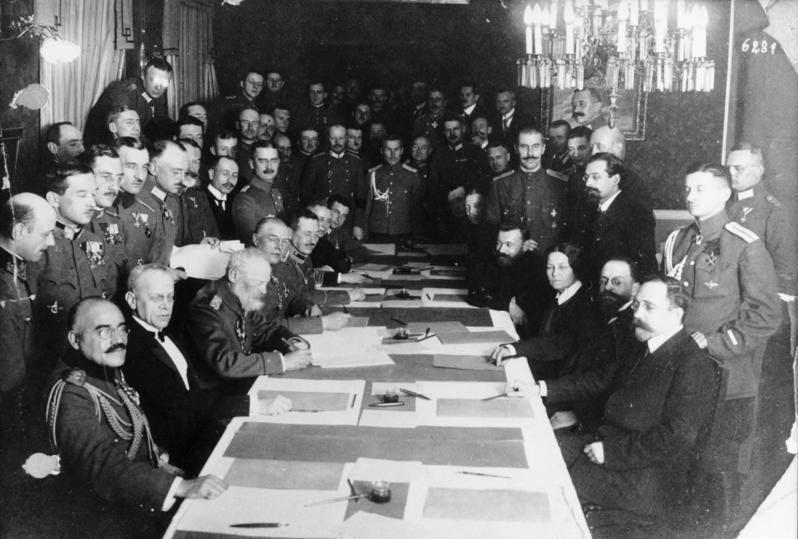
Zeki Pasha (bottom left) led the Ottoman delegation that signed the armistice with Russia.
