= Battle of Prilep =

Battle which occurred during the First Balkan War

- Part of First Balkan War
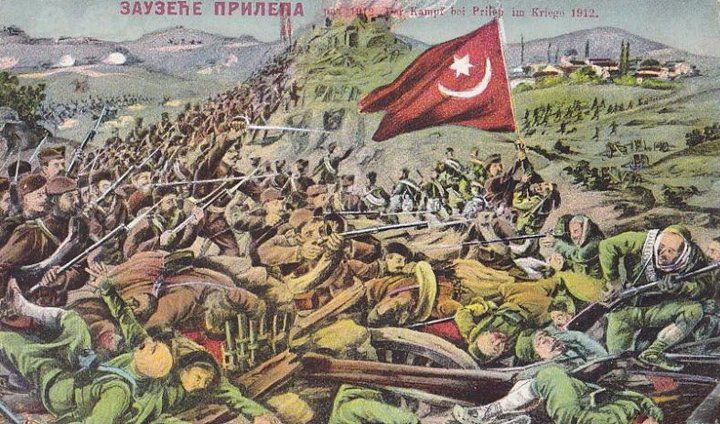
- Battle of Prilep 1912
Date	3–5 November 1912
Location	Prilep, Monastir District, Manastir Vilayet, Ottoman Empire; Vardar Macedonia 41°20′40″N 21°33′10″E
Result	Serbian victory

Belligerents
Kingdom of Serbia	Ottoman Empire

Commanders and leaders
(Kingdom of Serbia) Petar Bojović	(Ottoman Empire) Zeki Pasha

Units involved
(Kingdom of Serbia) First Army; Morava Division; Drina Division	(Ottoman Empire) V Corps

Strength
132,000 men (in total)	32,000 men

Casualties and losses
2,000 killed and wounded	1,352 casualties; 300 killed; 900 wounded; 152 captured

The Battle of Prilep in the First Balkan War took place on 3-5 November 1912 when the Serbian army encountered Ottoman troops near the town of Prilep, in today's North Macedonia. The clash lasted for three days. Eventually the Ottoman army was overwhelmed and forced to retreat.

Bad weather and difficult roads hampered the 1st Army’s pursuit of the Ottomans after the battle of Kumanovo, forcing the Morava Division to move ahead of the Drina Division. On 3 November, in the autumn rain, forward elements of the Morava Division encountered fire from Kara Said Pasha’s 5th Corps from positions north of Prilep. This started the three-day battle for Prilep, which was broken off that night and was renewed the next morning. When the Drina Division arrived on the battlefield, the Serbs gained an overwhelming advantage, forcing the Ottomans to withdraw south of the city.

On 5 November, as the Serbs moved south of Prilep they came again under Ottoman fire from prepared positions on the heights of the road to Bitola. Bayonets and hand grenades gave the Serbs the advantage in hand-to-hand fighting, but they still required the better part of the day to force the Ottomans to retreat. The overt and guileless nature of the Serbian infantry attacks impressed one Ottoman observer, who noted: "The development of the Serbian infantry attack was as open and clear as the execution of a barracks exercise. Large and strong units covered the entire plain. All the Serbian officers were seen clearly. They attacked as if on parade. The picture was very impressive. One part of the Turkish officers were struck dumb by the wonder of this mathematical disposition and order, the other sighed at this moment because of the absence of heavy artillery. They remarked on the arrogance of the open approach and clear frontal attack."

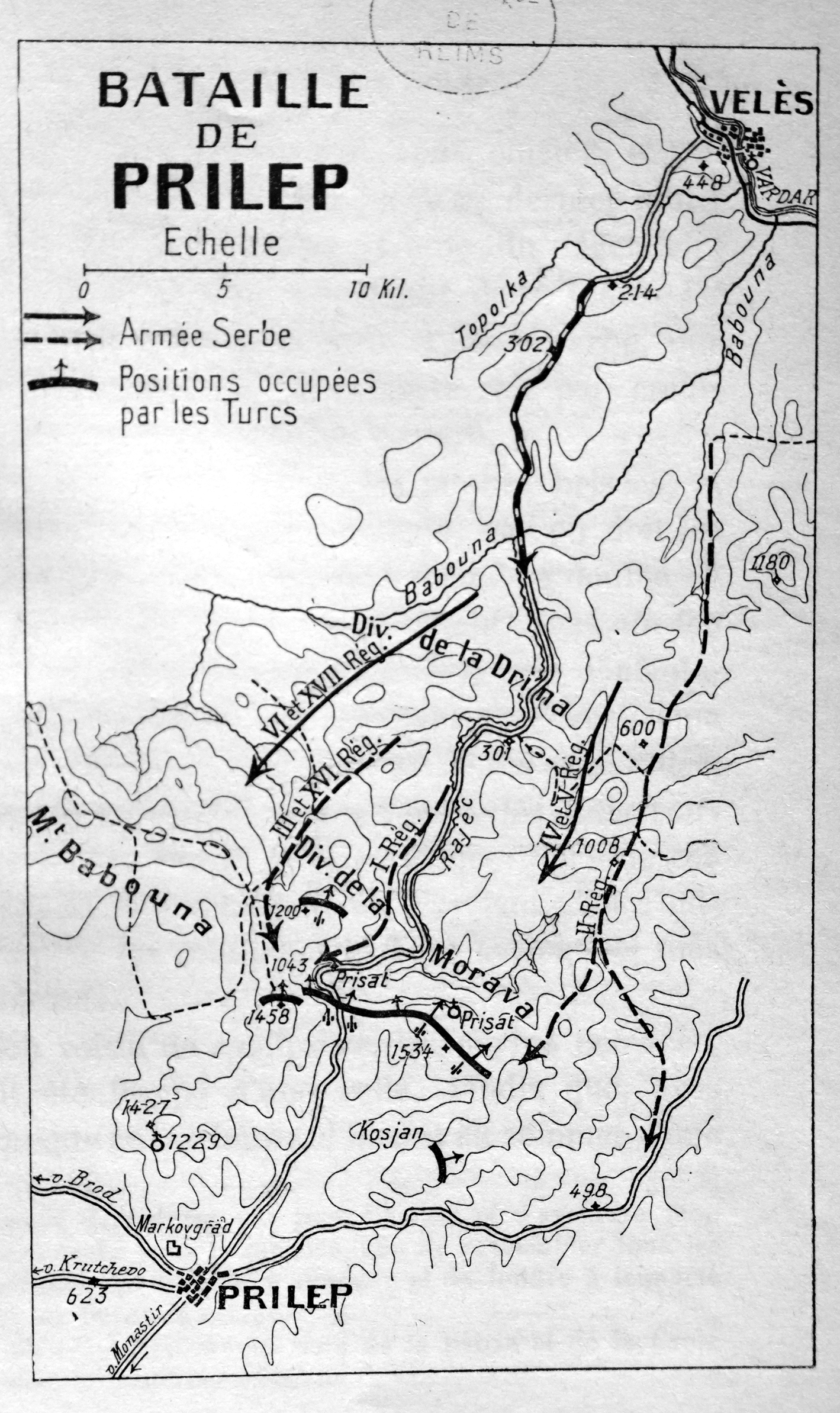
Map

The artillery abandoned in Skoplje would have helped the Ottoman defenders south of Prilep. The Serbs demonstrated the same lack of subtlety in their infantry attacks that caused heavy casualties among all the combatants during the Balkan Wars and would cause many during the First World War. During this battle, the Serbian 1st Army was without the presence of its commanding general, Crown Prince Alexander. Ill from the rigors of the cold and wet campaign, he maintained telephone contact with his army from his sickbed in Skoplje.

The short, sharp battles around Prilep demonstrated that the Ottomans were still capable of opposing the Serbian march through Macedonia. Even after abandoning the city of Prilep, the Ottoman 5th Corps fought stubbornly south of town. The size and enthusiasm of the Serbs overcame the Ottomans, but at a cost. The Ottomans suffered around 300 dead and 900 wounded, and 152 were taken prisoner; the Serbs had losses of around 2,000 dead and wounded. The road southwest to Bitola now lay open to the Serbs.
