= Hüseyin Avni Bey =

Ottoman military commander

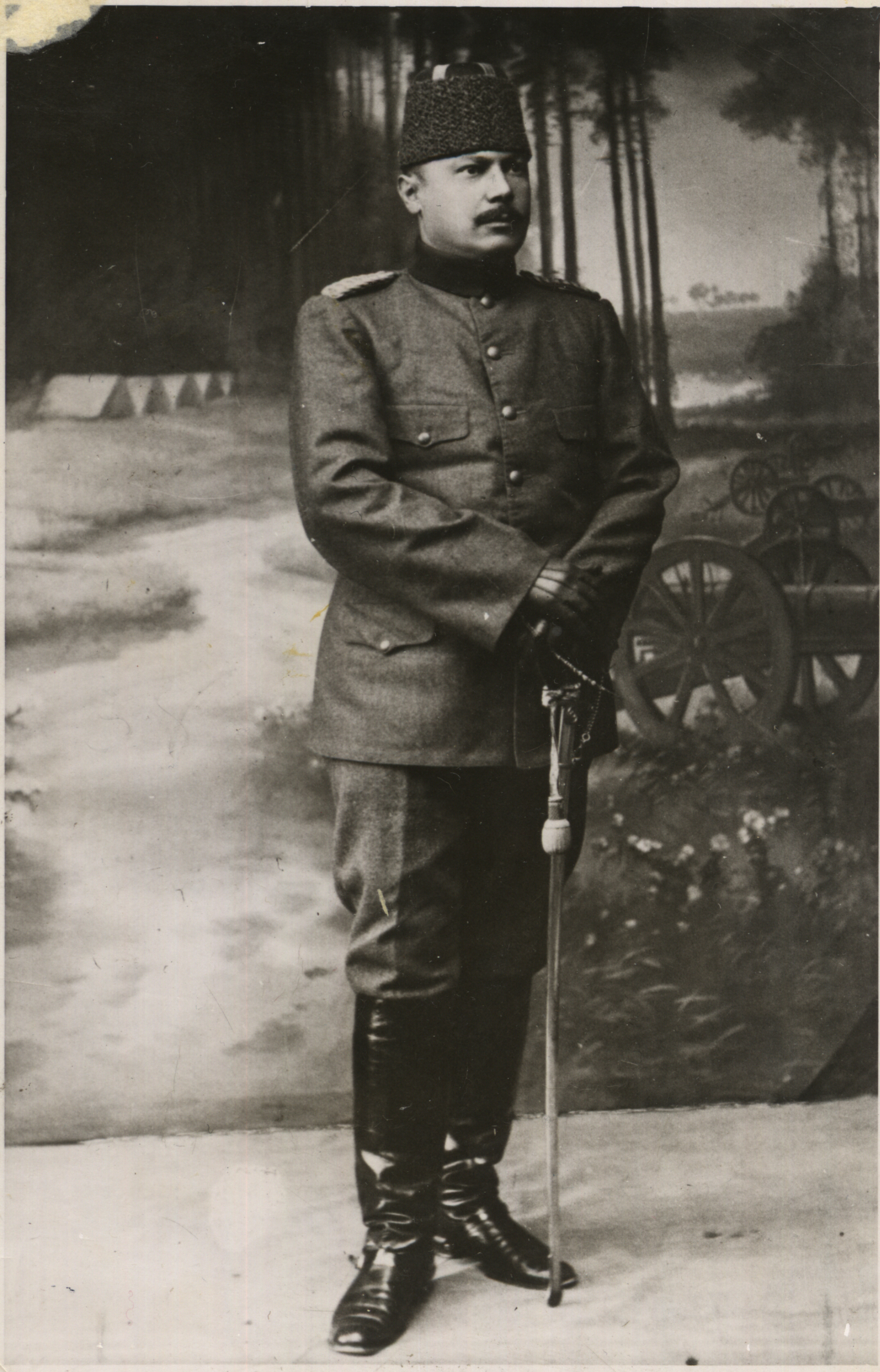
- Hüseyin Avni
- Born: 1875; Manastir, Ottoman Empire (modern Bitola, North Macedonia)
- Died: August 13, 1915 (aged 39–40); Gallipoli, Ottoman Empire
- Military career
- Allegiance: Ottoman Empire
- Branch: Ottoman Army
- Service years: 1889–1915
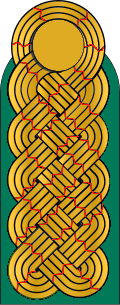
- Rank: Binbaşı (Major)
- Conflicts: Greco-Turkish War of 1897; First Balkan War; Gallipoli Campaign
- Awards: Order of the Medjidie, Order of Osmanieh, Imtiaz Medal, Liakat Medal, Gallipoli Star

Hüseyin Avni Bey (1875 - 13 August 1915) was the commander of the 57th Infantry Regiment of the Ottoman Army at the Battle of Gallipoli during which he led a counterattack that successfully stabilized the right flank of the Ottoman defences on 25 April 1915.

== Early life ==
Hüseyin Avni Bey was born in Manastir, Ottoman Empire (in the present day Bitola, North Macedonia) in 1875. At the time of his birth his father Ali Bey, was a District Governor. The family’s ancestors had originally settled at the beginning of the 15th century in what is today Alanya in southern Turkey. In the 1420s they joined the conquest of the Balkans led by Sultan Murad II and for their service were given land in Serbia.

== Career ==
Avni entered the Mekteb-i Harbiye (military school) in 1889. He graduated as a lieutenant on 6 May 1892 and was assigned to the 3rd Battalion 2nd Division of the 18th Ordinance Regiment of the 3rd Army on 15 May of the same year. On 8 August 1895, he was promoted to Mülâzım-ı evvel (First Lieutenant) and assigned to the 3rd Battalion 4th Division of the 33rd Regiment. He participated in the Greco-Turkish War of 1897. Afterwards he was assigned on 23 May 1897 to serve as an assistant officer in the headquarters of the Pristina 20th Redif Livası. On 10 January 1898 he was promoted to captain and assigned to the 38th Redif Regiment in the 2nd Stip Battalion of the 1st Division.

On 22 August 1904, he was promoted to the rank of Kolağası (Major) and took command of the 3rd Battalion of the 90th Redif Regiment. In June 1908, he was promoted to command of the 3rd Battalion of the 17th Nizamiye Regiment with the rank of Binbashi. On 11 July 1912 he was appointed as the Director of the 3rd Branch of the 7th Corps Administrative Committee. Shortly afterwards he served in the First Balkan War. On 12 January 1914, he was appointed Deputy Commander of the 23rd Regiment.

On 23 February 1915 he succeeded Miralay Şemi Bey as commander of the 57th Infantry Regiment which was stationed in Tekirdağ. The regiment was assigned to the 19th Division which was being raised by Lieutenant Colonel Mustafa Kemal (who was ten years younger than Avni). The regiment was training at Rodosto when in response to the perceived threats to the Dardanelles the III Corps of which the 19th Division was part was assigned the task of reinforcing the Gallipoli Peninsula. As a result the 57th regiment received orders on the 21 February 1915 to transfer to Gallipoli. On 25 February the regiment arrived at Maydos by steamship. By April 1915 the 19th divisional headquarters and divisional units were stationed on the Yeldegirmeni Plains near the village of Bigalı (Boghali) while the actual regiments were around Maltepe and Mersintepe on the Gallipoli Peninsula.

Upon receiving word on the morning of the 25 April 1915 that Allied forces had landed on the peninsula Mustafa Kemal moved forward. Identifying that the Australian contingent was making for the high ground dominating the narrows, he ordered the entire 57th Regiment forward to counter-attack with words “I do not order you to attack, I order you to die! In the time which passes until we die, other troops and commanders can take our place” Avni led his regiment in an action during which it sustained heavy losses but were able to successfully stabilize the right flank of the Turkish defences.

In Kemal's subsequent war report on the battle he describes Avni as a kind-hearted, faithful and highly esteemed commander.

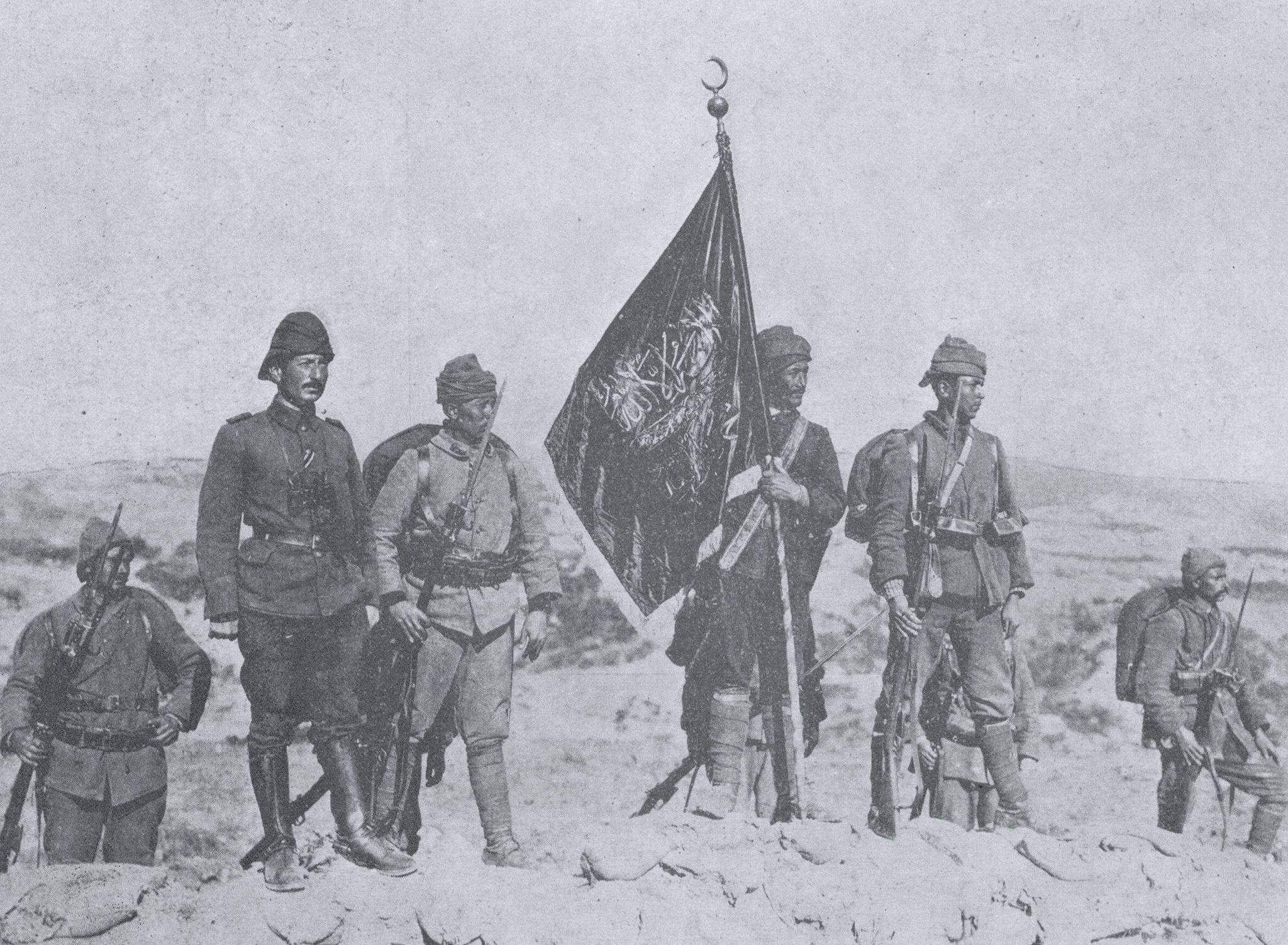
Hüseyin Avni and others at Gallipoli, 1915

== Death ==
Hüseyin Avni's military uniform, displayed in Istanbul's Military Museum

On the morning of a religious festival on 13 August 1915, the regiment’s officers decided to use a site overlooking Anzac Cove near the regiment's field hospital to exchange greetings, as they thought it be out of the enemy’s artillery range. However a howitzer shell exploded 10 metre away followed by a second one which exploded right over their tent. Avni was wounded and missing an arm. As he ly on the ground dying his last words were "give notice to my family, long live the nation". He was 40 years old. His comrades buried him close by. He was succeeded as commander of the 57th Regiment by Major Hayri Bey. Greatly distressed upon hearing about Avni’s death, Mustafa Kemal ordered that his uniform and personal belongings to be sent to his family. His uniform, sword and some relics were later donated by his family to the Military Museum in Istanbul.

== Descendants ==
Hüseyin Avni left behind his wife Fatma Zehra's as well as a young son Tekin (Mehmet Fehmi) and daughter Melek.

Hüseyin Avni's family received the surname "Arıburun" after the 1934 Surname Law that required all Turkish citizens to adopt a surname. The surname "Arıburun" was specifically chosen by Atatürk to honour the heroic acts of the Turkish soldiers who fought at Gallipoli. Arıburun means "the point purified by martyrs' blood" and taken from "Ariburu", the Turkish name for the Anzac Cove.

Avni's son Tekin Arıburun followed his father into the armed forces and rose to become the chief of the Turkish Air Force and later a senator and in 1973 acting president of Turkey.

For many years Tekin Arıburun searched for his father's battlefield grave. The only description of its location that he had was that it was close to those three pines, on a small height near where the command post of the 57th Regiment had been. Finally in 1955, he found the burial site, which was identified by a rusted tinplate bearing the words, "Commander of the 57th Regiment, Avni". Tekin Arıburun subsequently had the remains moved to its present location where a permanent memorial was installed.

== Grave ==
Hüseyin Avni’s grave (Şehit Yarbay Hüseyin Avni Bey Anıt Mezarı) is located in area is known as Zeytinlik Mevkii. It is enclosed by an iron fence and bears the inscription in Turkish “Hero 57th Infantry Regiment Commander Lieutenant Hüseyin Avni, son of Ali, Manastir (Bitola). Date of Martyrdom July 31st, 1331 – August 13th, 1915, Pray Fatiha”. Also present underneath a Turkish flag is a plaque that bears a longer description, dedicated to the dead of the 57th regiment and listing its achievements.
