= Şefik Aker =

Ottoman and Turkish Army officer

Şefik Aker 1312-P. 84
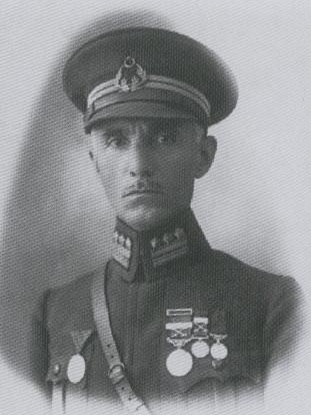
- Born: 1877; Kesriye (Kastoria), Manastir Vilayet, Ottoman Empire
- Died: 6 February 1964 (aged 86–87); Istanbul, Turkey
- Military career
- Allegiance: Ottoman Empire (1896–1919); Turkey (1919–1931)
- Branch: Army
- Service years: 1896–1931
- Rank: Colonel
- Commands: 27th Regiment, 19th Division, 59th Division, 49th Division, 57th Division, XXI Corps (deputy); 57th Division, Menderesler Group, 6th Division, Dinar-Menderes Area Command, Antalya Area Command, 7th Division, Special Military Court of the Western Front, Recruitment Committee of the XI Corps, member of the Second Istanbul Military Court for senior and junior officers
- Conflicts: Greco-Turkish War; Italo-Turkish War; Balkan Wars; First World War; Turkish War of Independence
- Awards: Yunan Muharebe Madalyası (1898); Order of the Medjidie (1899); Liakat Medal (1900); Gallipoli Star (1915); Medal of Independence

Mehmed Şefik (1877 – 6 February 1964) known as Şefik Aker after the 1934 Surname Law, was an officer of the Ottoman Army and the Turkish Army. He is best known for his service during the Gallipoli campaign and in particular the defense he led during the first day of the Allied landing on 25 April 1915. He subsequently served in a number of senior roles during the rest of World War I and during the War of Independence.

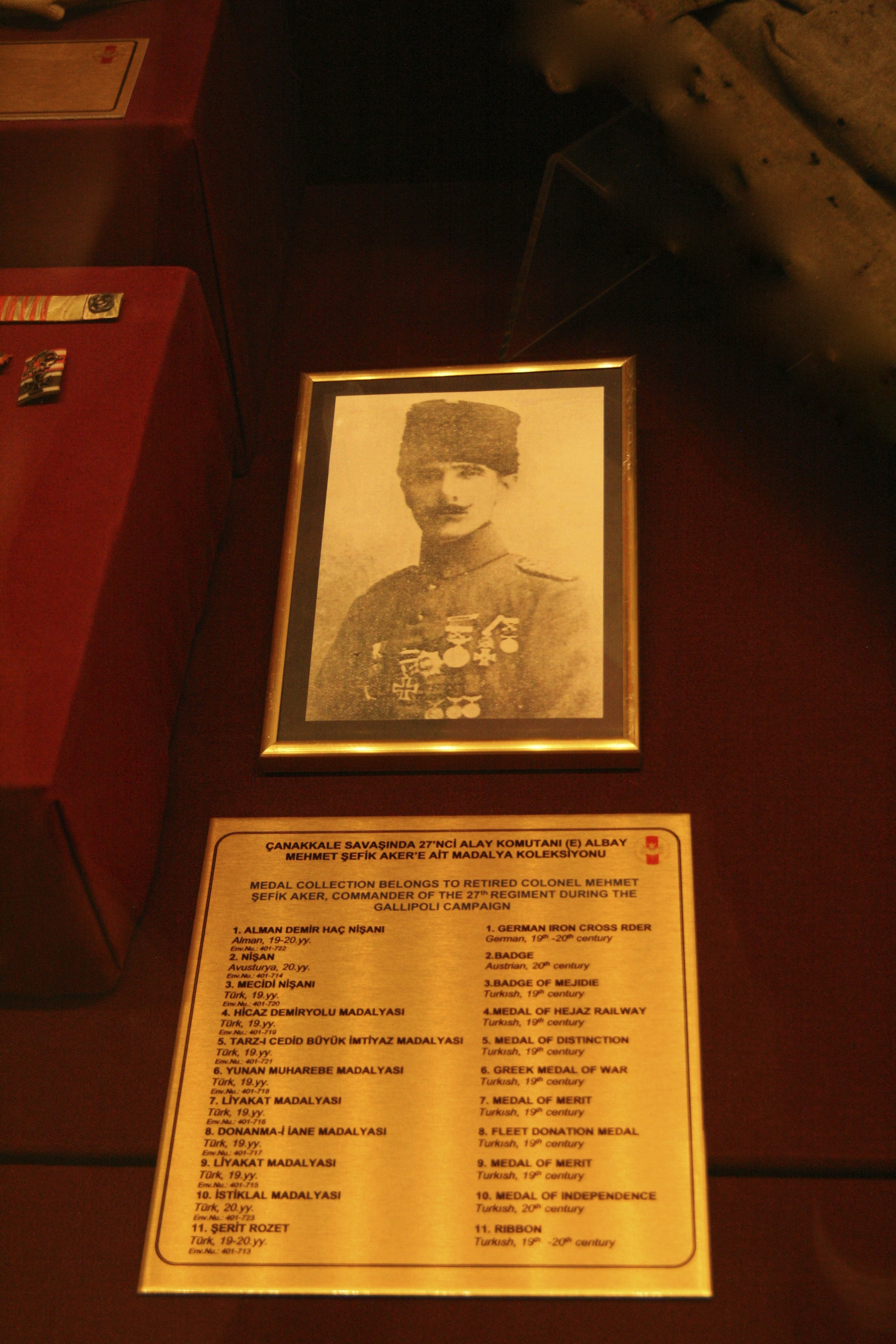
Şefik Aker's picture at the Istanbul Military Museum.

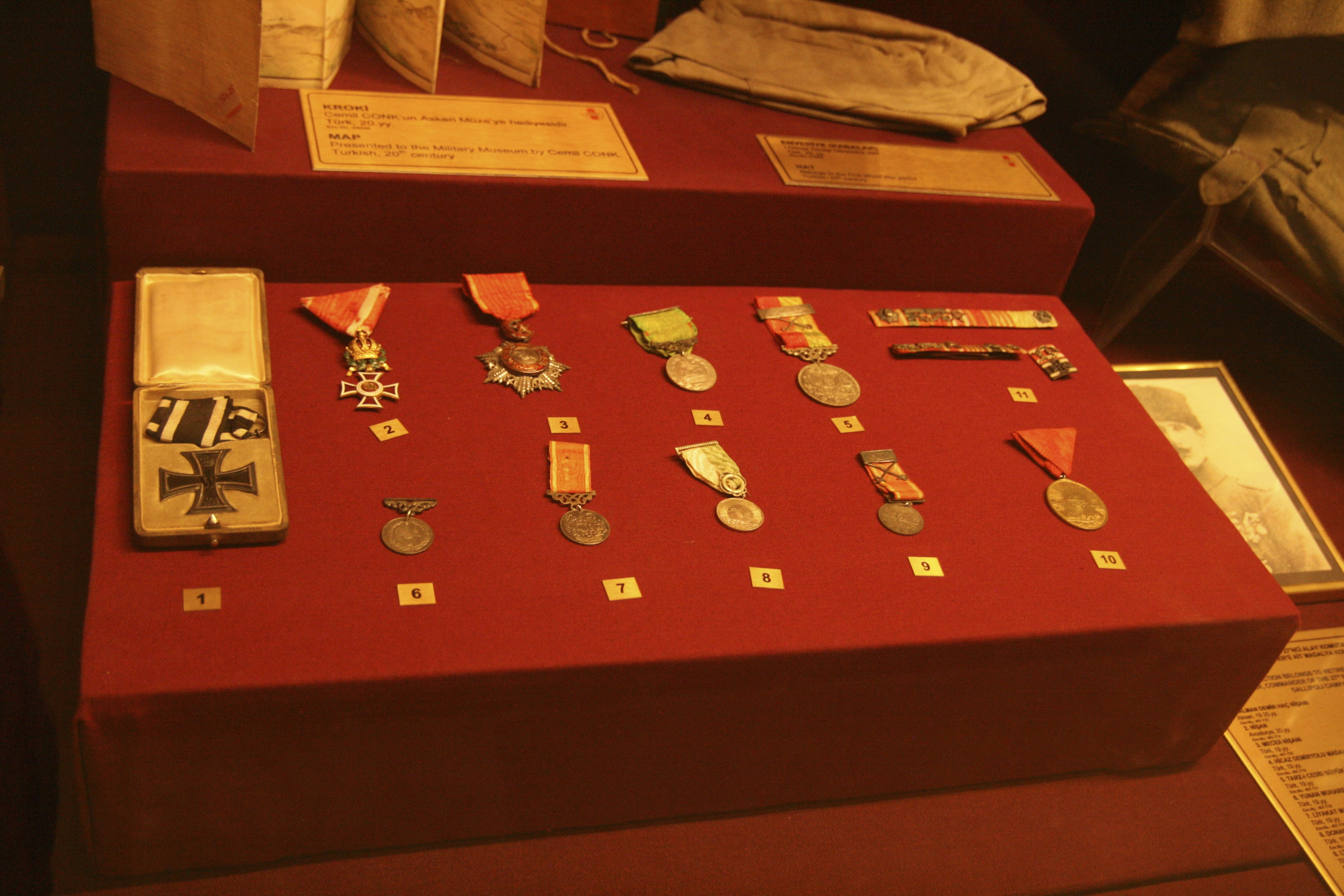
Şefik Aker's medals at the Istanbul Military Museum.

== Career ==
=== Early life ===
Şefik was born an Albanian family in 1877 to Selim Bey in Kesriye which was part of the Province of Manastir of the Ottoman Empire in what is now Western Macedonia in modern Greece.

He entered the Ottoman Military College in Istanbul in April 1894 where he was a successful student, though his achievements were not high enough upon his graduation with the rank of Lieutenant on 17 August 1896 for him to be selected to attend General Staff College. Following his graduation Şefik was appointed to lead a platoon in Debre in Albania. He served with distinction in the Greco-Turkish War of 1897 and as a result was made a staff officer at the headquarters of the 28th Brigade in Istanbul.

As Sefik preferred a more active command this lead him to volunteer for the Yemen Expeditionary Force on 8 March 1900, although he did not receive the combat command position he sought. By now he had been promoted to the rank of Yüzbaşı (Captain). For two years Şefik served in Yemen on the staff of the 14th Division, including a brief period as the Chief of Staff. During this often brutal counterinsurgency campaign 5efik fell seriously ill which led to him returning in 1902 to Istanbul. Between 1903 and 1911 Şefik served in company and battalion command positions in the North Aegean region. These appointments gained him promotion to the rank of Kolağası (Major) on 18 July 1908. Upon the commencement in 1911 of the Italo-Turkish War he volunteered for combat and was allocated the command of local volunteers. Şefik sought service with his former unit during the Balkan Wars. but was unable to obtain a post until the final stages of the war.

Taking up his appointment as the commanding officer of the Ezine Reserve Battalion he was assigned to the Suvla region on the Aegean coast of the Gallipoli peninsula, which gave him first-hand experience of the region and the soldiers he would command during the Gallipoli campaign. Şefik was able to avoid the large-scale purge of the Ottoman army officer corps at the end of the Balkan war and was appointed to command of the 3rd Battalion of the 25th Regiment in the 9th Division which was stationed in the Dardanelles area at Çanakkale in February 1914.

=== Gallipoli campaign ===
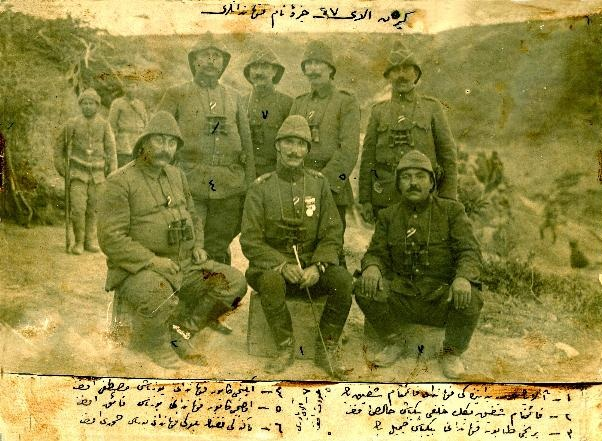
Officers of the 27th Regiment. Left to right. front row: Major Halil Bey (Ataksor), commander of the 27th Regiment Colonel Şefik Bey (Aker), commander of the 1st battalion Major Cemal Bey. Back row: commander of the 2nd battalion Captain Mustafa Efendi, commander of the 3rd battalion Faik Efendi, commander of the Machine gun company Captain Sabri Efendi, aide-de-camps Cevdet Efendi.

Following the appointment of Lieutenant Colonel Irfan to command the Menderes Detachment on 10 November 1914 Şefik was appointed to replace him as commander of the 27th Infantry Regiment of the 9th division. On 29 November 1914 he was promoted to the rank of Binbaşı (Lieutenant Colonel). By this time he was a respected though uncompromising serious officer though with a reputation as a difficult subordinate. While its officers were from various parts of the Ottoman Empire most of the conscripts and NCOs of the 27th Regiment came from the Gallipoli Peninsula which had a diverse ethnic composition. Due to the Ottoman authorities being suspicious of the reliability of its Greek and Armenians citizens most of the regiments combat soldiers were local Muslims, though non-Muslims made up half of its auxiliary and support staff. At the time that took over command the regiment was responsible for the southern region of the Gallipoli Peninsula (including Helles, Kabatepe and Suvla). The regiment was soon assigned the specific task of defending the coastline between Ece Bay and Kakabtepe. He began a program of digging and fortification of trenches in order to avoid his men being caught out in the open by naval shellfire. He also made it plain to his officers that the forward units were not to retreat when attacked but instead to be prepared to sacrifice their lives in order to gain time for reserve units to arrive.

Following a detailed inspection of the terrain Şefik identified that the Ariburnu (ANZAC Cove) region was a critical point and in early March 1915 commenced the construction of a comprehensive defensive system, though it was soon halted due a change in defensive strategy imposed by Otto Liman von Sanders, who believed in the deployment of light screening forces along the coastline while retaining strong mobile reserves and supplies in the interior. Following the arrival of Mustafa Kemal's 19th Division on the peninsula on 26 February 1915 the 9th Division was reassigned to defend the Asiatic coast, but the 27th Regiment was left behind and reassigned to the 19th Division.

On the night of the 24/25 April 1915 while 2nd battalion of his regiment was in position spread out over approximately 12 km of coastline between Azmakdere and Çamtepe while the 1st and 3rd battalions of the regiment had been engaged in a field exercise and forced march before returning to their encampment at Eceabat. After he was woken by the sound of artillery fire to the west, Sefik telephoned the observation post at Kaba Tepe, who confirmed that an Allied landing was underway. He raised his regiment and then began repeatedly requesting permission from division headquarters to advance to the coast. Finally at 5.45 am permission was received, and the battalions departed across the Maltepe Plain with the object of occupying the critical Topçular Sırtı (also known as Third Ridge, Gun Ridge or Artillery Ridge) inland of ANZAC Cove. As Sefik and his two battalions were approaching Kavak Tepe, they made contact with his 2nd Battalion that had conducted a fighting withdrawal. The entire regiment then became engaged in heavy fighting which slowed the Allied advance until following the arrival of the 57th Regiment they began a counterattack that stabilized the frontline. The regiment suffered heavy casualties during the fighting on 25 April but remained in the frontline on the Gallipoli Peninsula. When Mustafa Kemal relinquished his command of the 9th Division on 8 August 1915 to take up a position as commander of Anafartalar Group (of six divisions) on the Gallipoli Peninsula, Şefik's combat success (despite his vocal criticism of the Ottoman defense to date) was recognized with command of the 19th Division.

Following the evacuation of the Allied forces and the end of the Gallipoli campaign in January 1916 the 19th Division was attached to the XV Corps and sent to reinforce the Austrian-Hungarian Army on the Galician Front. Şefik used the opportunity while in command of the 19th Division to put it through an intensive training regime which transformed it into the best in the Ottoman Army. Şefik's troops were used as shock troops to cover for deficiencies in the poorly performing Austrian-Hungarian Army. Objecting to the use of his soldiers as "cannon fodder" he came into conflict with his Austro-Hungarian and German superiors. This conflict resulted in him being recalled and reassigned on 7 October 1916, to head the Izmir Division of Military Service, which was basically responsible for provincial recruitment. Ahmet Sedat Doğruer succeeded him as commander of the 19th Division. Şefik was promoted to the rank of Miralay (Colonel) on 14 December 1916. Despite his valuable combat experience, Şefik was obviously out of favour with his superiors and served for the remainder of the war commanding various reserve divisions employed in home guard and coastal defense. These were command of the 59th Division from 28 January 1917, the 49th Division from 19 July 1917, and the 57th Division from 24 July 1917. In addition to his command of the 57th Division, he also served as Deputy Commander of the 21st Corps from 24 October 1917. He ended the war as the Commander of the Izmir Southern Front (Dinar-Menderes Group) together with the 57th Division.

=== Greco-Turkish War (1919–1922) ===
The Armistice of Mudros which came into effect on 1 November 1918 ended hostilities in the Middle Eastern theatre between the Ottoman Empire and the Allies of World War I. Among its conditions, was one for the Ottomans surrendered their remaining garrisons outside Anatolia. Şefik largely ignored this requirement and was able to keep his division intact in Aydın, Antalya. Together with 56th Division Şefik's 57th division (made up of the 135th Infantry Regiment, 175th Infantry Regiment and 176th Infantry Regiment) was part of the 17th Corps, which was headquartered at Smyrna under the command of Ali Nadir Pasha. Şefik was able to conduct a fighting withdrawal following the landing on 15 May 1919 of the Greek troops at Smyrna at the commencement of what became the Greco-Turkish War (1919–1922) phase of the larger Turkish War of Independence. The 57th Regiment took Aydin back from the Greeks on 29–30 June 1919 in what was the first main Turkish success against them. From then until the end of 1920 he organised Turkish forces in the Southern Aegean region. at Aydin West Turkey.

In the latter half of 1920 the Turkish military leadership made the decision to bring the various militia forces that had sprung up under control. The militias were offered the option of either joining the regular army as reserve units or if they would not fight or had committed crimes of demobilizing. One such militia was led by Demirci Mehmet Efe who following the killing of Sökeli Ali Efe who was one of his men in the town of Denizli, had entered the town on 9 July 1920 and killed 60 of the people, whom he held responsible. Demirci Mehmet Efe had first accepted the military's offer, but later rejected it. As a result, Colonel Refet Bey after receiving the consent of Mustafa Kemal undertook to bring Demirci Mehmet Efe and his 800 men (nearly half of which were cavalry) to heel by commencing a cavalry campaign from Afyonkarahisar against them on 11 December 1920. Şefik's Turkish forces assisted Refet Bey by on 14 December raiding the village of İğdecik, where Demirci Mehmet Efe had been based, which forced some of Demirci Efe's forces to disperse to other villages. These villages were in turn raided and militiamen seized. On 18 December 1920, 700 of the militiamen were captured. Eventually on 30 December 1920, Demirci Mehmet Efe and his remaining men surrendered to a cavalry detachment of Refet Bey's led by Captain Nuri Bey. Şefik's opposition to radical restructuring of the Turkish forces on the Western front resulted in him being reassigned to command of the Pursuit Detachment Command, which had been formed in response to an uprising at Konya in August 1920. At the same time, he was assigned to assist the Ministry of National Defense with its procurement of weapons and ammunition from Italians in Antalya. On 1 March 1921 he was appointed to command the 6th Division, followed by on 14 June 1921, the Antalya and Airport Command, command of the 7th Division on 24 November 1921, command of the Konya Court of Warfare on 9 May 1922and on 11 September 1922 Chairman of the 11th Corps Recruiting Board in Elazığ.

Şefik was suspended in November 1923 after being accused of financial misconduct and brutality against civilians. Despite being cleared of these charges he was never again appointed to a position of influence. On 28 January 1924, he was appointed as a member of the MSB No. 2 Istanbul Senior Officer and Officer Council. He retired from the army on 25 February 1931, dedicating the rest of life to restoring his reputation. In response to the Surname Law he adopted the surname "Aker" in 1934. He died in Istanbul on 6 February 1964.

== Works ==
- Çanakkale-Arıburnu Savaşları ve 27 Alay (Çanakkale Arıburnu Battles and the 27th Anniversary) Askeri Mecmua magazine, No 40, 1935. Republished by Arma Yayınları in 2001. ISBN 975-7336-26-2
- İstiklal Harbinde 57. Tümen ve Aydın Milli Cidali (57th Division in the War of Independence and Aydın National Cidali). 1937. Published by Askeri matbaa.

== See also ==
- 19th Division
- List of high-ranking commanders of the Turkish War of Independence
