= Henri 4 (film) =

- Film poster
- Directed by: Jo Baier
- Based on: Die Jugend des Königs Henri Quatre and Die Vollendung des Königs Henri Quatre by Heinrich Mann
- Starring: Julien Boisselier; Joachim Król
- Music by: Henry Jackman, Hans Zimmer
- Release date: 13 February 2010 (BIFF)
- Running time: 155 minutes
- Countries: Germany, France, Austria, Spain
- Languages: German, Latin, Italian

Henri 4 is a 2010 drama film directed by Jo Baier. It is a German-French-Austrian-Spanish co-production.

== Plot ==
In 1563, Calvinist Protestantism has arrived in France, but the Catholic reaction is not long in coming and the small but steadily growing Protestant population is suppressed in French society. However, the Huguenots, particularly in Southern France and in the small Kingdom of Navarre near Spain, resisted. Catherine de' Medici, the actual ruler of France, wants to counter this. Her two sons, Charles IX and Francis, Duke of Anjou show weakness in this fight and Henry, the young prince of Navarre, vital strength. Catherine de' Medici has to give in and makes Henry an offer of peace, which he, tired of fighting, accepts. This peace also means that Margot, the daughter of the Medicis, married in Paris with Henry. But even during the wedding celebrations, the Catholics strike: They cause a bloodbath among the Protestant wedding guests who have traveled. About 20,000 Huguenots die on this Bartholomew night.

== Cast ==
- Julien Boisselier – Henry IV
- Joachim Król – Agrippa
- Andreas Schmidt – Guillaume du Bartas
- Roger Casamajor – Maximilien de Béthune 'Rosny'
- Armelle Deutsch – Margot
- Chloé Stefani – Gabrielle d'Estrées
- Sven Pippig – Beauvoise
- Sandra Hüller – Catherine
- Hannelore Hoger – Catherine de' Medici
- Ulrich Noethen – Charles IX
- Devid Striesow – Henry III
- Matt Zemlin
- Jakub Fischer - Soldier
