= Taşlıca Detachment =

Turkish military detachment involved in the First Balkan War

Taşlıca Detachment Taşlıca Müfrezesi
- Active: 1912–
- Country: Ottoman Empire
- Allegiance: Vardar Army
- Size: Detachment
- Garrison/HQ: Taşlıca (present day: Pljevlja)
- Patron: Sultans of the Ottoman Empire

The Taşlıca Detachment of the Ottoman Empire (Turkish: Taşlıca Müfrezesi) was one of the Detachment under the command of the Ottoman Vardar Army of the Western Army. It was formed in Taşlıca (present day: Pljevlja) area for the defense of the Sanjack of Yenipazar during the First Balkan War.

== Balkan Wars ==
=== Order of Battle, October 19, 1912 ===
On October 19, 1912, the detachment was structured as follows:

- Taşlıca Detachment HQ (Serbian Front, under the command of the Vardar Army of the Western Army)
  - 60th Infantry Regiment
  - Taşlıca Redif Division
