= Zemlin =

Zemlin (Russian: Землин, from земля meaning earth) is a Russian masculine surname, its feminine counterpart is Zemlina. It may refer to:

- Alexander Zemlin (born 1991), Russian sport shooter
- Matt Zemlin (born 1980), European actor, producer and director
- Viktor Zemlin (born 1964), Russian football player

== See also ==
- Ziemlin, village in Poland
