= Firzovik Detachment =

Firzovik Detachment Firzovik Müfrezesi
- Active: 1912–
- Country: Ottoman Empire
- Allegiance: Vardar Army
- Size: Detachment
- Garrison/HQ: Firzovik (present day: Uroševac)
- Patron: Sultans of the Ottoman Empire

The Firzovik Detachment of the Ottoman Empire (Turkish: Firzovik Müfrezesi) was one of the detachments under the command of the Ottoman Vardar Army of the Western Army. It was formed in Firzovik (present day: Uroševac) area during the First Balkan War.

== Balkan Wars ==
=== Order of battle, October 19, 1912 ===
On October 19, 1912, the detachment was structured as follows:

- Firzovik Detachment HQ (Serbian Front, under the command of the Vardar Army of the Western Army)
  - 20th Division
  - Metroviça Redif Division
