= Ahmet Zeki Soydemir =

Turkish military officer and politician

Ahmet Zeki Soydemir 1321-P. 5
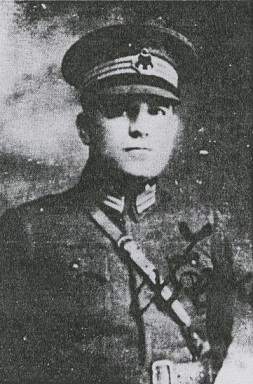
- Born: 1883; Selanik (Thessaloniki), Ottoman Empire
- Died: 4 September 1954 (aged 70–71); Istanbul, Turkey
- Burial place: Edirnekapı Şehitliği; State Cemetery
- Military career
- Allegiance: Ottoman Empire; Turkey
- Service years: Ottoman: 1905– Turkey: – 17 December 1934
- Rank: Tümgeneral (Major general)
- Commands: 21st Regiment (deputy), Staff of the II Corps, Chief of Staff of the 48th Division, Chief of Staff of the III Corps; 7th Mounted Infantry Division (deputy), Chief of Staff of the Southern Front, 6th Division, Provisional Division, 2nd Cavalry Division, General Commander of the Gendarmerie, 15th Division, 1st Cavalry Division, 57th Division, 1st Cavalry Division, Chief of staff of the First Army
- Conflicts: Balkan Wars; First World War; Turkish War of Independence; Turkish capture of Smyrna
- Other work: Member of the GNAT (Erzurum); Member of the GNAT (Çankırı)

Ahmet Zeki Soydemir (1883; Selanik (Thessaloniki) – 4 September 1954; Istanbul) was an officer of the Ottoman Army and a general of the Turkish Army. He fought in the First Balkan War and World War I. The cavalry division under his command was one of the first to liberate Smyrna from the Greek Forces during the Turkish War of Independence. He served as the Commander of the Gendarmerie. Entered politics, he was a member of parliament between 1935 and 1950.

== Personal life and education ==
Ahmet Zeki was born in Selanik, Ottoman Greece in 1883. He graduated from the Ottoman Army War College in 1905 in the rank of a lieutenant. He continued his military education at the Ottoman War Academy, and graduated in 1908 as a captain eminent.

== Military career ==
Until 1912, he served in various officer ranks of the Ottoman Army.

=== Balkan War ===
He was appointed commander of the 3rd Company of the Akhisar Battalionin the Çatalca Army on 28 November 1912, and was stationed at the Çatalca position during the First Balkan War (8 October 1912 – 30 May 1913). On 14 August 1914, he was appointed Commander of the 2nd Company of the 1st Battalion in the III Corps' 27th Infantry Regiment. He was promoted to the rank of senior captain on 1 September 1914, and subsequently appointed to the Staff of the III Corps on 18 September 1914.

=== World War I ===
While he was on this duty, Ottoman Empire entered into World War I on 29 October 1914. He was promoted to the rank of major on 12 July 1915, and on 21 November 1915, with his staff commission approved, he was appointed as the Commander of the 1st Battalion of the 57th Infantry Regiment. While on this duty, he was promoted to the rank of staff major on 12 July 1915. In 1916, he was appointed as the deputy commander of the 21st Regiment in Anafarta, as the Chief of Staff of the 2nd Army's II Corps on 20 June 1916, and as the Chief of Staff of the 48th Division on 12 May 1918.

=== Turkish War of Independence ===
During the Turkish War of Independence, he became the deputy commander of the 7th Mounted Infantry Division on 10 November 1920, and in December 1920, he became the chief of staff of the Southern Front Command. He was promoted to the rank of lieutenant colonel on 1 March 1921, and subsequently became the commander of the 6th Division, then the commander of the Organized Division in the Battle of the Sakarya (23 August – 13 September 1921), and the commander of the 2nd Cavalry Division on 17 September 1921. He was promoted to the rank of staff colonel on 31 August 1922. The 2nd Cavalry Division under his command entered and liberated the Greek-occupied İzmir as the first Turkish force on 9 September 1922.

=== Republic era ===
Following the Proclamation of the Republic of Turkey (29 October 2023), he was appointed Director of the 1st Branch of the General Staff on 27 December 1923, and General Commander of the Gendarmerie on 6 June 1924.

He was promoted to brigadier general on 30 August 1927. He was appointed commander of the 15th Division on 2 January 1930, commander of the 1st Cavalry Division on 18 March 1930, commander of the 57th Division on 13 February 1931, then commander of the 1st Cavalry Division, member of the Military Court of Appeals on 19 May 1932, and chief of staff of the 1st Army Inspectorate on 1 January 1933. He retired due to disability on 17 December 1934.

Major General Ahmet Zeki Soydemir was awarded various medals and decorations by the Ottoman Empire and Afghanistan, and the Medal of Independence by the Grand National Assembly of Turkey.

== Civilian life and death ==
In his civilian life, Soydemir entered politics joining the Republican People's Party (CHP), and served in the parliament as the Deputy of Erzurum in the 5th (1935–1939), 6th (1939–1943) and 7th (1943–1946) terms, and as the Deputy of Çankırı in the 8th (1946–1950) term.

Ahmet Zeki Soydemir died on 4 September 1954.

== See also ==
- List of high-ranking commanders of the Turkish War of Independence

== Sources ==
Military offices
Preceded by Baha Hurşit Süel	General Commander of Gendarmerie; 15 June 1924–28 August 1928	Succeeded by Kâzım Orbay
