= VII Corps (Ottoman Empire) =

VII Corps Yedinci Kolordu
- Active: 1911–1918
- Country: Ottoman Empire
- Type: Corps
- Garrison/HQ: Üsküp; Sana'a
- Patron: Ottoman Sultan
- Engagements: First Balkan War; Battle of Kumanovo

Commanders
- Notable commanders: Mirliva Ahmet Tevfik Pasha

The VII Corps of the Ottoman Empire (Turkish: 7 nci Kolordu or Yedinci Kolordu) was one of the corps of the Ottoman Army. It was formed in the early 20th century during Ottoman military reforms.

== Formation ==
=== Order of Battle, 1911 ===
With further reorganizations of the Ottoman Army, to include the creation of corps level headquarters, by 1911 the VII Corps was headquartered in Üsküp. The Corps before the First Balkan War in 1911 was structured as such:

- VII Corps, Üsküp
  - 19th Infantry Division, Üsküp
    - 55th Infantry Regiment, Kumanova
    - 56th Infantry Regiment, Kumanova
    - 57th Infantry Regiment, Bilaç ve Berana
    - 19th Rifle Battalion, Üsküp
    - 19th Field Artillery Regiment, Üsküp
    - 19th Division Band, Üsküp
  - 20th Infantry Division, Metroviça
    - 58th Infantry Regiment, Metroviça
    - 59th Infantry Regiment, Taşlıca
    - 60th Infantry Regiment, Taşlıca
    - 20th Rifle Battalion, Yakova
    - 20th Field Artillery Regiment, Priştine
    - 20th Division Band, Metroviça
  - 21st Infantry Division, Yakova
    - 61st Infantry Regiment, Yakova
    - 62nd Infantry Regiment, İpek
    - 63rd Infantry Regiment, Berana
    - 21st Rifle Battalion, Yakova
    - 21st Field Artillery Regiment, Pirzerin
    - 21st Division Band, Yakova
- Units of VII Corps
- 7th Rifle Regiment, Monastir
- 7th Cavalry Brigade, Monastir
  - 6th Cavalry Regiment, Monastir
  - 16th Cavalry Regiment, İştip
  - 13th Horse Artillery Regiment, Pirlepe
- 3rd Horse Artillery Battalion, Monastir
- 2nd Mountain Artillery Battalion, Monastir
- 8th Mountain Artillery Battalion, Monastir
- 9th Mountain Artillery Battalion, Elbasan
- 5th Field Howitzer Battalion, Monastir
- 6th Engineer Battalion, Köprülü
- 6th Telegraph Battalion, Monastir
- 6th Transport Battalion, Monastir
- Border companies x 9

== Balkan Wars ==
=== Order of Battle, October 19, 1912 ===
On October 19, 1912, the corps was structured as follows:

- VII Corps (Serbian Front, under the command of the Vardar Army of the Western Army)
  - 19th Division
  - Üsküp Redif Division, Priştine Redif Division

== World War I ==
=== Order of Battle ===
During World War I, the corps was structured as follows:

- VII Corps
  - 39th Division (Taiz Operational Region, commanded by Miralay Ali Sait Bey)
  - 40th Division (Tehame Operational Region, commanded by Miralay Hüseyin Ragıp Bey, since March 9, 1917, Kaymakam Galip Bey)

== After Mudros ==
=== Order of Battle, November 1918 ===
In November 1918, the corps was structured as follows:

- VII Corps
  - 39th Division (commanded by Mirliva Ali Sait Pasha)
  - 40th Division (commanded by Kaymakam Galip Bey)
