= Vardar Army =

- Active: 1912
- Country: Ottoman Empire
- Type: Field Army
- Patron: Sultans of the Ottoman Empire

Commanders
- Notable commanders: Harepli Zeki Pasha

The Vardar Army of the Ottoman Empire (Turkish: Vardar Ordusu) was one of the field armies under the command of the Western Army. It was formed during the mobilisation phase of the First Balkan War.

== Order of Battle, October 19, 1912 ==
On October 19, 1912, the army was structured as follows:

- Vardar Army HQ (Serbian Front, concentration center: Kumanovo)
  - V Corps
    - 13th Division, 15th Division, 16th Division
    - İştip Redif Division
  - VI Corps
    - 17th Division, 18th Division
    - Manastır Redif Division, Drama Redif Division
  - VII Corps
    - 19th Division
    - Üsküp Redif Division, Priştine Redif Division
  - II Provisional Corps
    - Uşak Redif Division, Smyrna Redif Division, Denizli Redif Division
  - Firzovik Detachment
  - Taşlıca Detachment
  - Independent Cavalry Division
    - 7th Cavalry Brigade, 8th Cavalry Brigade

== Order of Battle, November 12, 1912 ==
On November 12, 1912, the army was structured as follows:

- Vardar Army HQ (Serbian Front, Monastir)
  - Northern Group
    - V Corps
      - 13th Division
      - 15th Division
      - 5th Rifle Regiment
      - 26th Cavalry Regiment
      - 19th Artillery Regiment
    - VII Corps
      - 19th Division
      - İştip Redif Division
      - 17th Cavalry Regiment
  - Southern Group
    - VI Corps
      - 16th Division
      - 18th Division
      - 6th Rifle Regiment
  - Southeastern Group
    - 17th Division
    - Manastır Redif Division
  - Independent Cavalry Brigade

== Order of Battle, November 16, 1912 ==
On November 16, 1912, the army was structured as follows:

- Vardar Army HQ (Serbian Front, Monastir)
  - Left Flank Offensive Corps
    - VI Corps
      - 16th Division
      - 19th Division
      - Fethi Bey Detachment
      - Independent Cavalry Brigade
  - Right Flank Defensive Corps
    - VII Corps
      - İştip Redif Division
    - V Corps
      - 13th Division
      - 15th Division
      - 18th Division
