= Matt Zemlin =

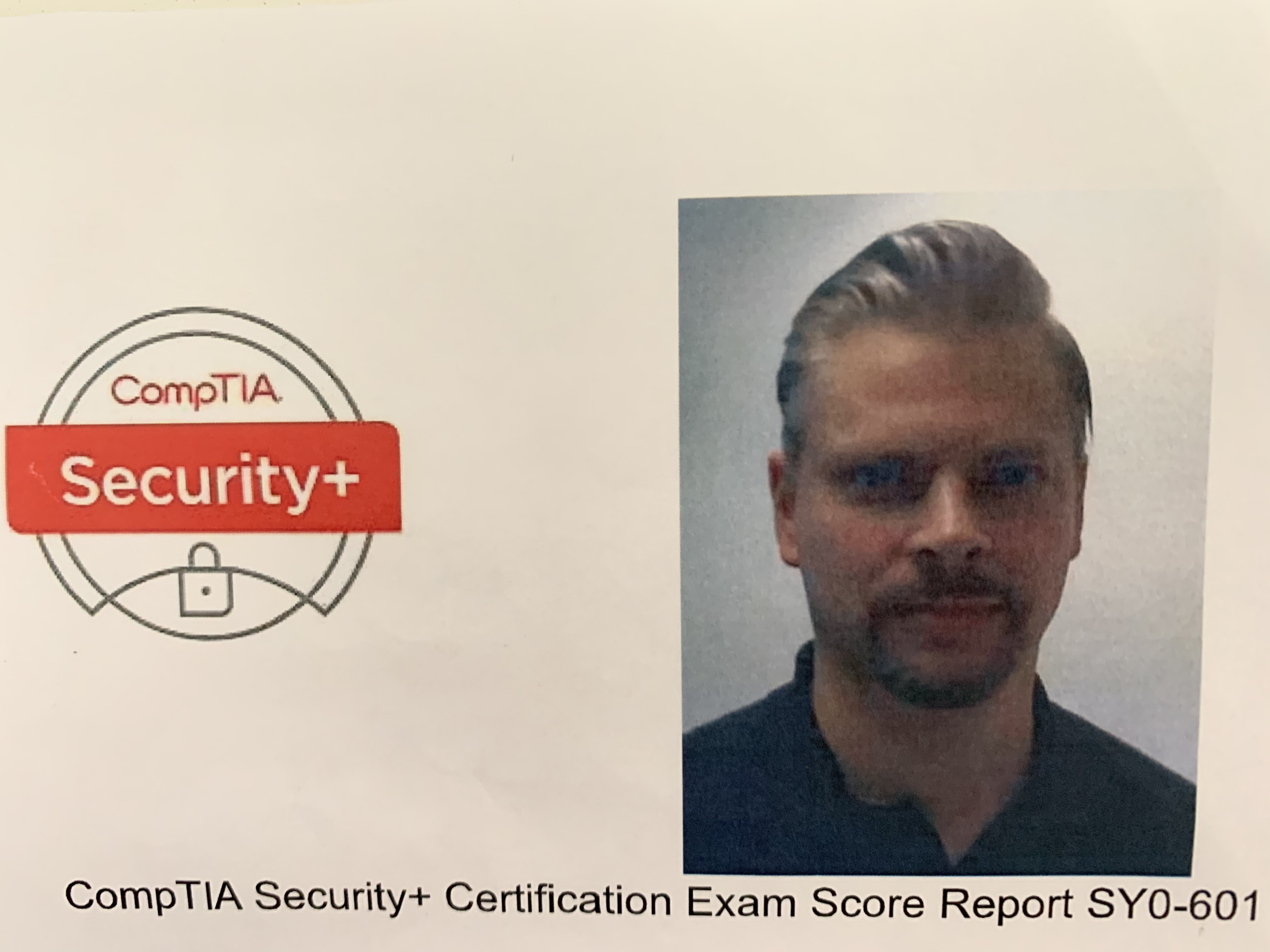
Certification Report Picture

Wolfgang "Matt" Zemlin (born September 11, 1980) is a German manager, cyber security and online expert, former film distributor, producer, director and actor.

Matt Zemlin graduaded from Kingston Business School with a major in IT. He is a certified IT risk manager and an EC-Council Certified Ethical Hacker as well as certified by Darktrace.

Recently Matt Zemlin played a key role in implementing Mediflow's multi-channel strategy and significantly increasing brand awareness.

Before, in 2012 and 2013, Zemlin was known as one of the key players in senior publisher management in the online industry in Germany. He was also involved in the film industry, e.g. with his distribution of several Bollywood blockbusters. Notable director and producer credits included the European production Dirty Money (2013) and Bollywood productions such as Wanted (2009), Aakrosh (2010), Dabangg (2010) and Rockstar (2011) that have been released internationally Zemlin repeatedly appeared in German TV shows like Einsatz in Hamburg and had film roles in international productions such as Brain Dead (2007), The Sky Has Fallen (2009), Henri 4 (2010), King of the Underground (2011) and Closer Than Love (2013).
