= 27th Infantry Regiment (Ottoman Empire) =

Regiment of the Ottoman Army during World War I

- Country: Ottoman Empire
- Branch: Ottoman Army
- Part of: 9th Infantry Division
- Engagements: World War I: Gallipoli Campaign; Landing at Anzac Cove

Commanders
- Notable commanders: Lieutenant Colonel Irfan; Lieutenant Colonel Mehmed Şefik; Kör Halis

The 27th Infantry Regiment (Turkish: 27 nci Piyade Alayı or Elli Yedinci Piyade Alayı) or simply 27th Regiment (Turkish: 27 nci Alay or Yirmi Yedinci Alay) was a regiment of the Ottoman Army during World War I. It is best known for its response to the landing at Anzac Cove of Australian and New Zealand forces on 25 April 1915 during the Gallipoli campaign.

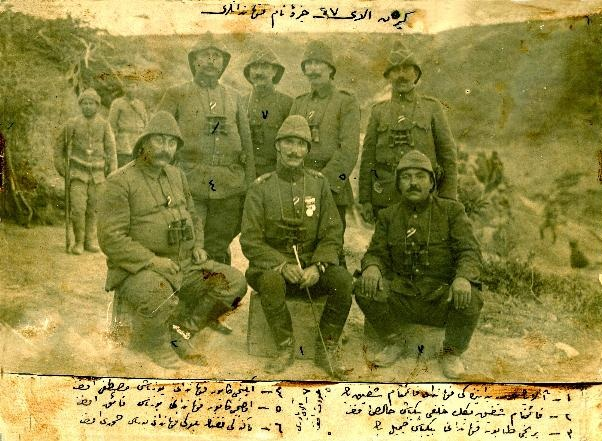
Officers of the 27th Regiment. Left to right. Front row: Major Kör Halis (Ataksor), commander of the 27th Regiment Colonel Şefik (Aker), commander of the 1st battalion Major Cemil. Back row: commander of the 2nd battalion Captain Mustafa, commander of the 3rd battalion Faik, commander of the machine gun company Captain Hamdi, aide-de-camps Cevdet.

== History ==
The date of the regiment's formation is unknown.

=== World War I ===
At the start of World War I the regiment was assigned to the 9th Division. In September 1914 the 27th Regiment and the 9th Division relocated to the Gallipoli Peninsula. Following the appointment of Lieutenant Colonel Irfan to command the Menderes Detachment on 10 November 1914 Kolağası (Major) Mehmed Şefik was appointed to replace him as commander of the 27th Regiment of the 9th division. On 29 November 1914 Şefik was promoted to the rank of Binbaşı (Lieutenant Colonel).

While its officers were from various parts of the Ottoman Empire most of the conscripts and NCOs of the 27th Regiment came from the Gallipoli Peninsula which had a diverse ethnic composition. Due to the Ottoman authorities being suspicious of the reliability of its Greek and Armenian citizens most of the regiments combat soldiers were local Muslims, though non-Muslims made up half of its auxiliary and support staff. At the time that took over command the regiment was responsible for the southern region of the Gallipoli Peninsula (including Helles, Kabatepe and Suvla). The regiment was soon assigned the specific task of defending the coastline between Ece Bay and Kakabtepe. He began a program of digging and fortification of trenches in order to avoid his men being caught out in the open by naval shellfire. He also made it plain to his officers that the forward units were not to retreat when attacked but instead to be prepared to sacrifice their lives in order to gain time for reserve units to arrive. Following a detailed inspection of the terrain Şefik identified that the Ariburnu (ANZAC Cove) region was a critical point and in early March 1915 commenced the construction of a comprehensive defensive system, though it was soon halted due a change in defensive strategy imposed by Otto Liman von Sanders, who believed in the deployment of light screening forces along the coastline while retaining strong mobile reserves and supplies in the interior. Following the arrival of Mustafa Kemal's 19th Division on the peninsula on 26 February 1915 the 9th Division was reassigned to defend the Asiatic coast, but the 27th Regiment was left behind and reassigned to the 19th Division.

=== Gallipoli ===
The regiment was structured as follows at the commencement of the Gallipoli campaign: Commanding officer - Binbaşı (Lieutenant Colonel) Mehmed Şefik. Aide de camp - Under Lt. Cevdet.

- 1st Battalion. Commanded by Major Malatyali Ibrahim.
  - Company commanders - Captain İsmail Hakkı, Lt. İzzet, Captain Cemil, Captain Sadık
  - Section commanders: Under Lt. Talat, Officer Cadet Hayrettin, Under Lt. Ata Mazlum, Under Lt. Mehdi, Officer Cadet Salahattin, Under Lt. Süleyman, Under Lt. Suphi, Officer cadet İbrahim Ratıp.
- 2nd Battalion. Commanded by Major Mehmed Ismet. This battalion was not subordinate to the 27th Regiment, but directly reported to the commander of the 9th Division.
  - 5th Company. Commanded by Captain Huseyin Sabri.
  - 6th Company. Commanded by Captain Refix.
  - 7th Company. Commanded by 1st Lt. Asim.
  - 8th Company. Commanded by Captain Faik.
  - Four x 75 mm Krupp Gebirgskanone L/14 M1904 mountain guns. Commanded by Captain Sadik.
  - Four Short 150 mm guns. Commanded by 1st Lt Hasan Hifzi.
  - Two 87 mm Krupp Felkanome L/14M 1885 guns. Known by the Ottoman troops as the "Mantelli", because of their steel cladding.
  - Two 1-inch Nordenfelt multi-barrel rapid fire guns.
- 3rd Battalion. Commanded by Captain Kör Halis (1876 - 8 August 1933). Also known as Halis Bey, he was an experienced commander who had serviced in the Italo-Turkish War and Balkan Wars. Due to his performance during the initial days of the Gallipoli campaign he was promoted to major. He retired in 1925, after the Turkish War of Independence and became a civil engineer. He constructed the first concrete road in Turkey. As well as his native Turkish he spoke four languages. He wrote extensively, painted, and drew maps. He translated "The Paris Commune" into Turkish and was working on the translation of Herodotus when he died in Usak, Turkey of pneumonia in 1933. In response to the Surname Law his family adopted the surname "Ataksor". There is a memorial forest dedicated to him on the Gallipoli Peninsula.
  - Company commanders - Lt. Idris, who was later replaced by Lt. Mustafa, Captain Ziya, who was later replaced by Captain Galip.
  - Section team commanders - Under Lt. Lütfi, Under Lt. Mithat, Under Lt. Cemal, Under Lt. Hasan, Officer Cadet Ziya, Lt. Celal, Officer cadet Mucip, Officer cadet Halil, Officer cadet Medeni and Abdurrahman.
- 27th Machine Gun company with four 7.65 mm Maxim MG09 machine guns, organized into two platoons and employed in pairs or supporting platoons. Commanded by Captain Hamdi with serving under him, Lt. Halil and Officer cadet Saadet.
- 27th Mountain gun company with eight 75 mm Krupp Gebrigskanome L/14 M1904 guns.
- Medical units. Commanded by Dr. B. Rakım.

On 23 April 1915 the main camp of the 27th Regiment was bombed by the Royal Naval Air Service and the camp was, as a consequence, moved a kilometre to the west, which placed it closer to Gaba Tepe and into the cover of an olive grove which meant that it was less easily detected from the air.

On the night of the 24/25 April 1915 while the 2nd battalion of his regiment was in position spread out over approximately 12 km of coastline between Azmakdere and Çamtepe the 1st and 3rd battalions of the regiment had been engaged in a field exercise and forced march before returning to their encampment at Eceabat at 2am. Defending the immediate area around ANZAC Cove was the 250 strong 8th Company, of the regiment's 2nd Battalion, under the command of Captain Falk. One platoon was deployed around the Fisherman's Hut; a second platoon was located 1,500 metres south on Plugge's Plateau, overlooking Anzac Cove; while a third platoon was stationed 900 metres inland on Second Ridge. The rest of the 2nd Battalion was spread over the ten kilometres of coastline to the south. Contrary to popular belief, there were Faik's company had no machine guns as these they were held in a four gun company at regimental level.

A few hours later Sefik was woken by the sound of artillery fire to the west. He telephoned the observation post at Kabatepe, who confirmed that an Allied landing was underway. He raised his regiment and then began repeatedly requested permission from the division headquarters to advance to the coast. Finally at 5.45 am permission was received, and with his two battalions and his machine gun company (with its guns on pack-horses) departed at 6 am, marching hard across the Maltepe Plain with the object of occupying eight kilometres away the critical Topçular Sırtı (also known as Third Ridge, Gun Ridge or Artillery Ridge) inland of ANZAC Cove. As Sefik and his two battalions were approaching Kavak Tepe, which they reached by 7.40 am they made contact with the 2nd Battalion that had conducted a fighting withdrawal. The entire regiment then became engaged in heavy fighting which slowed the Allied advance until following the arrival of the first units of the 57th Regiment at around 9.30 am. In conjunction with this regiment the 27th began a coordinated counterattack from 11.30am onwards that eventually stabilized the frontline.

Captain Halis was shot in the arm and wounded in the foot early in the fighting, but refused medical evacuation. After receiving medical attention after the battle he didn't return to his duties until after the 5 May 1915.

The regiment suffered heavy casualties during the fighting on the 25 April but remained in the frontline on the Gallipoli Peninsula. When Mustafa Kemal relinquished his command of the 19th Division on 8 August 1915 to take up a position as commander of Anafartalar Group (of six divisions) on the Gallipoli Peninsula, Şefik was promoted to command the 19th Division. Kör Halis was promoted from his command of the 1st battalion to replace Şefik in command of the 27th Regiment. He remained in command until 5 April 1916.

=== Caucasus Front ===
Following the evacuation of the Allied forces and the end of the Gallipoli campaign in January 1916 the 27th Regiment was sent with the 9th Division to the Caucasus Front, where it was subsequently disbanded on 13 September 1916.
