= VI Corps (Ottoman Empire) =

VI Corps Altıncı Kolordu
- Active: 1911–
- Country: Ottoman Empire
- Type: Corps
- Garrison/HQ: Monastır, Aleppo

Commanders
- Notable commanders: Mustafa Hilmi Pasha

The VI Corps of the Ottoman Empire (Turkish: 6. Kolordu or Altıncı Kolordu) was one of the corps of the Ottoman Army. It was formed in the early 20th century during Ottoman military reforms. It is most notable for its participation in the offensive phase of the 1916 Romanian Campaign of World War I, where it was involved in heavy action all throughout the five months, inflicting heavy casualties on the Russo-Romanians and breaking through the Allied lines in several key areas. Additionally the VI Corps took 8,512 prisoners in Romania, including 6,512 Russians and 2,000 Romanians.

== Formation ==
=== Order of Battle, 1911 ===
With further reorganizations of the Ottoman Army, to include the creation of corps level headquarters, by 1911 the VI Corps was headquartered in Salonika. The Corps before the First Balkan War in 1911 was structured as such:

- VI Corps, Monastir
  - 16th Infantry Division, İştip
    - 46th Infantry Regiment, İştip
    - 47th Infantry Regiment, Koçana
    - 48th Infantry Regiment, Köprülü
    - 16th Rifle Battalion, İştip
    - 16th Field Artillery Regiment, İştip
    - 16th Division Band, İştip
  - 17th Infantry Division, Monastir
    - 49th Infantry Regiment, Monastir
    - 50th Infantry Regiment, Monastir
    - 51st Infantry Regiment, Monastir
    - 17th Rifle Battalion, Resne
    - 17th Field Artillery Regiment, Monastir
    - 17th Division Band, Monastir
  - 18th Infantry Division, Debre
    - 52nd Infantry Regiment, Debre
    - 53rd Infantry Regiment, Kırçova
    - 54th Infantry Regiment, Elbasan
    - 18th Rifle Battalion, Debre
    - 18th Field Artillery Regiment, Monastir
    - 18th Division Band, Debre
- Units of VI Corps
- 6th Rifle Regiment, Monastir
- 7th Cavalry Brigade, Monastir
  - 6th Cavalry Regiment, Monastir
  - 16th Cavalry Regiment, İştip
  - 13th Horse Artillery Regiment, Pirlepe
- 3rd Horse Artillery Battalion, Monastir
- 2nd Mountain Artillery Battalion, Monastir
- 8th Mountain Artillery Battalion, Monastir
- 9th Mountain Artillery Battalion, Elbasan
- 5th Field Howitzer Battalion, Monastir
- 6th Engineer Battalion, Köprülü
- 6th Telegraph Battalion, Monastir
- 6th Transport Battalion, Monastir
- Border companies x 2

== Balkan Wars ==
=== Order of Battle, October 19, 1912 ===
On October 19, 1912, the corps was structured as follows:

- VI Corps (Serbian Front, under the command of the Vardar Army of the Western Army)
  - 17th Division, 18th Division, 16th Division
  - Manastir Redif Division, Drama Redif Division

=== Order of Battle, July 1913 ===
- VI Corps (Anatolia)
  - 16th Division

== World War I ==
=== Order of Battle, August 1914, November 1914 ===
In August 1914, November 1914, the corps was structured as follows:

- VI Corps (Thrace)
  - 16th Division, 26th Division

=== Order of Battle, Late April 1915, Late Summer 1915, January 1916 ===
In Late April 1915, Late Summer 1915, January 1916, the corps was structured as follows:

- VI Corps (Thrace)
  - 16th Division, 24th Division, 26th Division

=== Order of Battle, August 1916 ===
In August 1916, the corps was structured as follows:

- VI Corps (Romania)
  - 15th Division, 25th Division

=== Order of Battle, December 1916, August 1917 ===
In December 1916, August 1917, the corps was structured as follows:

- VI Corps (Romania)
  - 15th Division, 25th Division, 26th Division

=== Order of Battle, June 1918 ===
- VI Corps (Caucasus)
  - 3rd Division, 36th Infantry Division

== See also ==
- Romania during World War I
  - First Battle of Cobadin
  - Second Battle of Cobadin
