= 5th Corps (Turkey) =

- Founded: 1911
- Country: Turkey
- Branch: Turkish Army
- Type: Infantry
- Size: Corps
- Part of: First Army
- Garrison/HQ: Çorlu, Tekirdağ Province
- Engagements: Gallipoli Campaign (World War I); Turkish War of Independence (1919-1923)

Commanders
- Major General: Mehmet Cafer Aksoytürk
- Notable commanders: Fahrettin Altay

The 5th Corps (Turkish: 5. Kolordu) is a field corps of the Turkish Army under 1st Army. It is headquartered at Çorlu in Tekirdağ Province. The 5th Corps was established in 1911 under the Ottoman Army with headquarters in Thessaloniki.

During its first (Ottoman) existence, which ended when its remnants were one of the nine Ottoman corps that formed the basis for the Turkish Land Forces, among its most notable commanders was Mirliva Mustafa Fevzi Pasha (December 22, 1913-April 1916).

== Order of Battle, 1911 ==
With the reorganizations of the Ottoman Army, to include the creation of corps headquarters, by 1911 the V Corps was headquartered in Salonika. Before the First Balkan War in 1911 the Corps included:

- V Corps, Salonika
  - 13th Infantry Division, Salonika
    - 37th Infantry Regiment, Salonika
    - 38th Infantry Regiment, Salonika
    - 39th Infantry Regiment, Salonika
    - 13th Rifle Battalion, Salonika
    - 13th Field Artillery Regiment, Salonika
    - 13th Division Band, Salonika
  - 14th Infantry Division, Serez
    - 40th Infantry Regiment, Serez
    - 41st Infantry Regiment, Nevrekop
    - 42nd Infantry Regiment, Cuma-i Bala
    - 14th Rifle Battalion, Yemen
    - 14th Field Artillery Regiment, Serez
    - 14th Division Band, Serez
  - 15th Infantry Division, Usturmaca
    - 43rd Infantry Regiment, Usturmaca
    - 44th Infantry Regiment, Petriç
    - 45th Infantry Regiment, Petriç
    - 15th Rifle Battalion, Gevgili
    - 15th Field Artillery Regiment, Salonika
    - 15th Division Band, Usturmaca
- Units of V Corps
- 5th Rifle Regiment, Salonika
- 6th Cavalry Brigade, Gevgili
  - 14th Cavalry Regiment, Gevgili
  - 25th Cavalry Regiment, Serez
  - 26th Cavalry Regiment, Salonika
- 5th Mountain Artillery Battalion, Katerin
- 6th Mountain Artillery Battalion, Katerin
- 4th Field Howitzer Battalion, Demir Hisar
- 5th Engineer Battalion, Gevgili
- 5th Transport Battalion, Salonika
- Salonika Port Command, Salonika
  - Heavy Artillery Battalion, Salonika
  - Torpedo Detachment, Salonika
  - Searchlight Detachment, Salonika
- Border Detachment

== Balkan Wars ==
=== Order of Battle, October 19, 1912 ===
On October 19, 1912, the corps was structured as follows:

- V Corps (Serbian front, under the command of the Vardar Army of the Western Army)
  - 13th Division, 15th Division, 16th Division
  - İştip Redif Division

=== Order of Battle, November 12, 1912 ===
On November 12, 1912, the corps was structured as follows:

- V Corps (under the command of the Northern Group of the Vardar Army)
  - 13th Division, 15th Division
  - 5th Rifle Regiment, 26th Cavalry Regiment, 19th Artillery Regiment

=== Order of Battle, November 16, 1912 ===
On November 16, 1912, the corps was structured as follows:

- V Corps (under the command of Right Flank Defensive Corps of the Vardar Army)
  - 13th Division, 15th Division, 18th Division

== World War I ==
In August 1914, the corps was located in Anatolia. It included the 13th, 14th, and 15th Divisions.

In November 1914 and in late April 1915, the corps, now in Thrace, included the 13th, 14th, and 15th Divisions.

In the late summer of 1915 and in January 1916, the corps, now at Gallipoli, included the 13th, 14th, and 15th Divisions.

In August 1916, the corps included the 9th Division, 10th Division, and 13th Division.

In December 1916 and August 1917, the corps, still stationed in the Caucasus, only had Coastal Detachments under its control.

== War of Independence ==
In 1921, during the Turkish War of Independence, it received the designation "5th Cavalry Corps." Its initial mission was the Western Front, where it participated in offensives against Greek forces. After the proclamation of the Republic, the corps was restructured and became the primary element of land defence in Thrace.

tr:Kurtcebe Noyan became a major-general in 1938. Initially given command of the 2nd Cavalry Division, he then became Deputy Commander of the 5th Corps. Promoted again to Lieutenant General in 1941, he became commander of the 5th Corps.

Hamza Bilgu wrote that in 1947, as large-scale U.S. assistance began to be discussed, that the "5th Corps, headquartered in Bursa, has two divisions attached to it. The 5th Division is stationed in Susurluk, and the 6th Division is stationed in Bandırma (Bandÿrma). This corps is responsible for the defence of the southern sector of the Sea of Marmara."

== Accession to NATO ==
With Turkey's accession to NATO in 1952, the 5th Corps was integrated into NATO's defence plans.

In 2004, the corps, with its headquarters at Corlu, was reported to include the 3rd Tactical Mechanized Division at Edirne; the 3rd Armoured Brigade; and the 54th, 55th, and 65th Mechanized Infantry Brigades.

During the July 15, 2016 coup attempt, the 5th Corps adhered to the chain of command and prevented the combined forces in Thrace from passing through to Istanbul.
