= Kol Aghassi =

Military rank in the Ottoman Empire

Kolağası (also written as Kol Ağası, Kol Aghasi) was a military rank of the Ottoman Army. It corresponds to a Senior Captain or an Adjutant Major. Kol Ağası is a compound word composed of Kol (column in Turkish) and Ağa (chief in Turkish).

The rank was junior to the rank Binbaşı (Major), and senior to the rank Yüzbaşı (Captain) in the Ottoman Army.

Despite being a single rank, Kolağası was divided in two: Sağ Kolağası (Kolağası of the Right Flank) and Sol Kolağası (Kolağası of the Left Flank). Sağ Kolağası was senior to Sol Kolağası. After the rank of Yüzbaşı (Captain), an officer had to first become Sol Kolağası, before becoming Sağ Kolağası.

== See also ==
- Comparative military ranks of World War I
- Asakir-i Mansure-i Muhammediye
