= 19th Infantry Division (Ottoman Empire) =

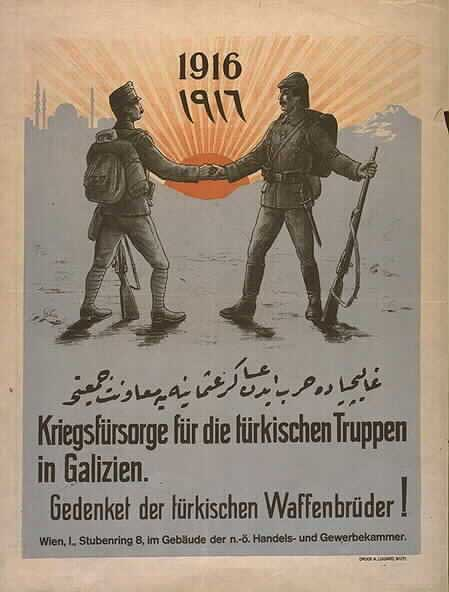
War Welfare for the Turkish Troops in Galicia.

The 19th Infantry Division was a formation of the Ottoman Army, during the Balkan Wars and the First World War.

In 2016 its descendant formation served as the 19th Motorised Infantry Brigade Command.

== Formation ==
Commander: Lieutenant Colonel Mustafa Kemal

- 57th Regiment: Major Hüseyin Avni
  - 1st Battalion Captain Ahmet Zeki
  - 2nd Battalion Captain Ata
  - 3rd Battalion Captain Hayri
- 72nd Regiment: Major Mehmet Münir
- 77th Regiment: Major Saip
- 39th Artillery Regiment: Major Halil Galib (Tekaki)

The 18th and 27th Regiments were also assigned to the division later in the Gallipoli campaign.
