= Battle of Dumlupınar order of battle =

Units and commanders present at the Battle of Dumlupınar

In August 1922 during the Battle of Dumlupınar, the opposing armies were deployed as follows:

== Greek order of battle ==
In summer 1922, the Greek Army of Asia Minor (Greek: Στρατιά Μικράς Ασίας) held a front of 713 km, extending from Cius in the Sea of Marmara south-east to a bulge around Eskişehir, thence south to Afyonkarahisar, where it turned west and south over the Akar Dağ Mountain and then followed the right bank of the Büyük Menderes River to the Aegean Sea. The line had been established following the retreat of autumn 1921, after the Battle of Sakarya. The Army of Asia Minor had its headquarters in Smyrna (Izmir) and was commanded by Lieutenant General Georgios Hatzianestis, with Major General Georgios Valettas as his chief of staff. It comprised a force of 220,000 men, of whom 140,000 were situated at the front but only 80,000 were counted as front-line combatants. The Army's equipment comprised 264 field guns, 980 machine guns and 2,592 sub-machine guns, as well as 55 aircraft.

The northern sector of the front, from the Marmara Sea to around Eskişehir, was covered by the III Corps, and the southern sector, a wide bulge around Afyonkarahisar, by the I Corps with II Corps as its immediate reserve. The remaining southern sector of the front along the Menderes was lightly held by rear-echelon units under the Smyrna Superior General Military Command (Ανώτερη Γενική Στρατιωτική Διοίκηση Σμύρνης). The Greek combat units were structured as follows, from north to south:

- III Corps, headquarters at Eskişehir, under Major General Petros Soumilas, with Colonel N. Spyropoulos as chief of staff
  - 11th Infantry Division under Major General Nikolaos Kladas, covering a sector of 60 km from the Sea of Marmara up to Bilecik. The Bilecik sector, linking the 11th with the 3rd Division, was held by the 16th Infantry Regiment detached from the 11th Division
  - 3rd Infantry Division under Colonel Georgios Gortzas, covering a sector of 50 km from Boz Dağ to Pursak
  - 10th Infantry Division under Colonel Dimitrios Papanikolaou), covering a sector of 50 km around Karatokat
  - Independent Division under Colonel Dimitrios Theodoulos, covering a sector of 50 km around Seyitgazi
  - Eskişehir Military Command
- I Corps, headquarters at Afyonkarahisar, under Major General Nikolaos Trikoupis, with Colonel Alexandros Merentitis as chief of staff
  - 5th Infantry Division under Colonel Nikolaos Rokas, covering the Bordi sector (45 km) north of Afyonkarahisar
  - 12th Infantry Division under Colonel Periklis Kallidopoulos, covering the Ince Karahisar sector (30 km) east of Afyonkarahisar, including the Çalışlar heights
  - 4th Infantry Division under Colonel Dimitrios Dimaras, covering the Kamelar sector (20 km) to the south of Afyonkarahisar
  - 1st Infantry Division under Major General Athanasios Frangou, reinforced with the 49th Infantry Regiment, covering the Akar Dağ sector (50 km) to the south-west of Afyonkarahisar.
  - The "Plastiras Detachment" under Colonel Nikolaos Plastiras, comprising Plastiras' own 5/42 Evzone Regiment and the 13th Mountain Artillery Squadron, both detached from the 13th Division, as the Corps reserve

Due to lack of forces, the 1st Division left 10-kilometre sector at the Çay Hisar ravine was left uncovered, and a further 6-kilometre gap existed between the lines of the 1st and 4th Divisions.

- II Corps, headquarters at Kazlı Göl Hamam to the north-west of Afyonkarahisar, under Major General Kimon Digenis, with Colonel I. Vasilakopoulos as chief of staff
  - 9th Infantry Division under Colonel Panagiotis Gardikas, covering the Sarice Dağ gap (32 km) with two battalions, while the rest were kept as a reserve at Duger
  - 13th Infantry Division under Colonel Miltiadis Kaibalis, covering the Demirler sector (10 km) with one regiment, with the 5/42 Evzone and an artillery squadron detached to I Corps, and with the other regiment as reserve at Ihsaniye
  - 7th Infantry Division under Colonel Vasileios Kourousopoulos, as reserve around Evret
  - Kütahya Military Command, with four battalions, covering the lines of communication in the rear area
  - 2nd Infantry Division under Colonel Stylianos Gonatas, reinforced with five battalions, covered a line of 170 km west of its base, Uşak, on the southern flank of I Corps, along with the
  - Cavalry Division under Major General Andreas Kallinskis-Roïdis, which was under direct Army Command control

== Turkish order of battle ==
Commander in chief (Müşir Mustafa Kemal Pasha)

Chief of the General Staff (Birinci Ferik Mustafa Fevzi Pasha)

Minister of National Defence: Mirliva Kâzım Pasha

- Western Front (Mirliva Ismet Pasha, CoS: Miralay Asim Bey)
  - Kocaeli Group (Miralay Deli Halid Bey)
    - 18th Division (Kaymakam: Mehmed Hulusi Bey, CoS: Yüzbaşı Ismail Hakki Efendi)
      - 15th Regiment (Kaymakam H. Hüsnü)
      - 24th Regiment (Binbaşı Reshad)
  - 25th Heavy Artillery Regiment (Binbaşı Hussein Vehbi Bey)
  - First Army (Mirliva Nureddin Pasha, CoS: Miralay Emin Bey, Vice CoS: Kaymakam Sabit Bey)
    - IV Corps (Miralay Kemaleddin Sami Bey, CoS: Binbaşı Yusuf Ziya Bey)
      - 8th Division (Miralay Kâzım Bey, CoS: Binbaşı Omer Subhi Bey)
        - 8th Brigade (Miralay Ahmed Nuri Bey)
          - 131st Regiment (Kaymakam Ahmed Hakki Bey)
          - 135th Regiment (Kaymakam Müfit)
          - 189th Regiment (Binbaşı Avni Bey)
          - Artillery Regiment (Kaymakam Zekeriya Bey)
      - 5th Caucasian Division (Kaymakam Halid Bey, CoS: Binbaşı Midhat)
        - 5th Caucasian Brigade (Kaymakam Ali Riza Bey)
          - 9th Regiment (Binbaşı Hüseyin Hüsnü Bey)
          - 10th Regiment (Binbaşı Ismail Hakki)
          - 13th Regiment (deputy: Binbaşı Djevat Bey)
          - Artillery Regiment (Binbaşı Nusret Bey)
      - 11th Division (Kaymakam Ahmed Derviş Bey, CoS: Binbaşı Ahmed Fevzi Bey)
        - 11th Brigade (Kaymakam Hafiz Halid Bey)
          - 70th Regiment (Binbaşı Rushdi Bey)
          - 126th Regiment (Binbaşı Ismail Hakki Bey)
          - 127th Regiment (Binbaşı Osmani Nuri Bey)
          - Artillery Regiment (Binbaşı Mahmud Djemal)
      - 12th Division (Miralay Osman Nuri Bey, CoS: Binbaşı Mehmed Zeki Bey)
        - 12th Brigade (Miralay Halil Rushdi Bey)
          - 35th Regiment (Kaymakam Talat Bey)
          - 36th Regiment (Binbaşı Mehmed Shahin Bey)
          - 34th Regiment (Kaymakam Hussein Husnu Bey)
          - Artillery Regiment (Kaymakam Abdulkerim Bey)
    - I Corps (Miralay Izeddin Bey, CoS: Binbaşı Muharrem Mazlum Bey)
      - 23rd Division (Miralay Omer Halis Bey, CoS: Mehmet Fahri Belen)
        - 23rd Brigade (Miralay Shakir Bey)
          - 31st Regiment (Binbaşı Mehmed Rifat)
          - 68th Regiment (Kaymakam Mehmed Tevfik)
          - 69th Regiment (Kaymakam Hüseyin Hüsnü)
          - Artillery Regiment (Binbaşı Hakki Bey)
      - 15th Division (Kaymakam Nadji Bey, CoS: Binbaşı Rasim Bey)
        - 15th Brigade
          - 38th Regiment (Kaymakam Ilyas Zeki Bey)
          - 45th Regiment (Binbaşı Ali Riza)
          - 56th Regiment (Kaymakam Mehmed Fehmi)
          - Artillery Regiment (Binbaşı Akif)
      - 14th Division (Kaymakam Edhem Nedjded Bey, CoS: Binbaşı Ali Riza)
        - 14th Brigade (Kaymakam Mehmed Shevket Bey)
          - 25th Regiment (Kaymakam Murad Bey)
          - 26th Regiment (Kaymakam Yusuf)
          - 30th Regiment (Kaymakam Ibrahim Edhem)
          - Artillery Regiment (Kaymakam Hussein)
      - 57th Division (Miralay Reshad Bey-after his suicide->Ibrahim Hakki Bey, CoS: Binbaşı Shemseddin Bey)
        - 57th Brigade (Miralay Ibrahim Hakki)
          - 37th Regiment (Kaymakam Refi Bey)
          - 39th Regiment (Binbaşı Ahmed Turhan Bey)
          - 176th Regiment (Kaymakam Mazhar)
          - Artillery Regiment (Binbaşı Seyfeddin Bey)
    - V Cavalry Corps (Mirliva Fahreddin Pasha)
      - 1st Cavalry Division (Miralay Mursel Bey, CoS: Binbaşı Mehmed Kemal Bey)
        - Cavalry Brigade (Miralay Djemil Bey)
          - 10th Cavalry Regiment (Kaymakam Ismail Hakki)
          - 11th Cavalry Regiment (Binbaşı Ali Riza Bey)
          - 14th Cavalry Regiment (Kaymakam Salih)
          - 21st Cavalry Regiment (Binbaşı Hüsnü)
      - 2nd Cavalry Division (Kaymakam Zeki Bey, Cos: Yüzbaşı Tevfik Efendi)
        - Cavalry Brigade (Miralay Ahmed Hamdi Bey)
          - 2nd Cavalry Regiment (Binbaşı Ahmed Kemal)
          - 4th Cavalry Regiment (Binbaşı Ali Reşat)
          - 13th Cavalry Regiment (Yüzbaşı Galip)
          - 20th Cavalry Regiment (Binbaşı Kiazim Bey, deputy Yüzbaşı Yusuf Nashuhi Efendi)
      - 14th Cavalry Division (Kaymakam Mehmed Subhi Bey, CoS: Kemal Muzaffer Efendi)
        - Cavalry Brigade (Kaymakam Hüseyin Husnu Bey)
          - 3rd Cavalry Regiment (Kaymakam Ferit Bey)
          - 5th Cavalry Regiment (Yüzbaşı Esad Bey)
          - 34th Cavalry Regiment (Binbaşı İbrahim)
          - 54th Cavalry Regiment (Binbaşı Hamid Bey)
      - 6th Division (Miralay Hussein Nazmi Bey, CoS: Binbaşı Sadik Bey)
        - 6th Brigade (Miralay Hussein Husnu Bey)
          - 50th Regiment (Binbaşı Remzi Bey)
          - 51st Regiment (Yüzbaşı Faik Bey)
          - 52nd Regiment (Yüzbaşı Mehmed Tevfik)
          - Artillery Regiment (Binbaşı Rasim Bey)
      - 3rd Cavalry Division (Kaymakam Ibrahim Bey, deputy commander: Yüzbşı Hasan Riza Efendi)
        - 27th Cavalry Regiment (Kaymakam Cemal Bey)
        - 28th Cavalry Regiment (Binbaşı Husnu Bey)
      - Dinar Detachment
        - 59th Regiment
    - II Corps (Miralay Ali Hikmed Bey, CoS: Kaymakam Ibrahim Rahmi Bey)
      - 7th Division (Miralay Nadji Bey, CoS: Binbaşı Mehmed Nuri Bey)
        - 7th Brigade (Miralay Kiazim Bey)
          - 2nd Regiment (Kaymakam Ali Vehbi Bey)
          - 23rd Regiment (Kaymakam Ali Bey)
          - 41st Regiment (Kaymakam Munir)
          - Artillery Regiment (Binbaşı Kiazim)
      - 4th Division (Miralay Mehmed Sabri Bey, CoS: Binbaşı Mustafa Fazil Bey)
        - 4th Brigade (Kaymakam Servet Bey)
          - 40th Regiment (Kaymakam Nedjib Kadri)
          - 42nd Regiment (Kaymakam Nedim Bey)
          - 58th Regiment (Kaymakam Mehmed Rushdi Bey)
          - Artillery Regiment (Binbaşı Nazmi Bey)
      - 3rd Caucasian Division (Miralay Kâzım Bey, CoS: Binbaşı Mehmed Faik)
        - 3rd Caucasian Brigade (Miralay Rifat)
          - 7th Regiment (Kaymakam Burhaneddin Bey)
          - 8th Regiment (Kaymakam Atif Bey)
          - 11th Regiment (Kaymakam Ismail Rahmi)
          - Artillery Regiment
  - Second Army (Mirliva Yakub Shevki Pasha, CoS: Kaymakam Hussein Husnu Bey, Vice CoS: Kaymakam Ali Riza Bey)
    - III Corps (Miralay Shukri Naili Bey, CoS: Kaymakam Hayrullah Bey)
      - 41st Division (Miralay Alaaddin Bey, CoS: Binbaşı Osman Nuri Bey)
        - 41st Brigade (Kaymakam Mumtaz Bey)
          - 12th Regiment (Kaymakam Ihsan Bey)
          - 16th Regiment (Kaymakam Omer Kirami Bey)
          - 19th Regiment (Kaymakam Omer Hulusi)
          - Artillery Regiment (Kaymakam Muammer Bey)
      - 61st Division (Kaymakam Salih Bey, CoS: Yüzbaşı Rushdi Efendi)
        - 61st Brigade (Kaymakam Ahmed Shemseddin Bey)
          - 159th Regiment (Kaymakam Rushdi)
          - 174th Regiment (Kaymakam Shevki Bey)
          - 190th Regiment (Kaymakam Irfan Bey)
          - Artillery Regiment (Kaymakam Mustafa Kiazim)
      - 1st Division (Miralay Abdurrahman Nafiz Bey] CoS: Binbaşı Mehmed Emin Bey)
        - 1st Brigade (Miralay Talat Bey)
          - 3rd Regiment (Kaymakam Salih Bey)
          - 4th Regiment (Kaymakam Ali Djevat Bey)
          - 5th Regiment (Kaymakam Hussein Husnu Bey)
          - Artillery Regiment (Kaymakam Izzet Bey)
      - Provisional Cavalry Division (Miralay Arif Bey, CoS: Yüzbaşı Hasan Fehmi Efendi)
        - 37th Cavalry Regiment (Kaymakam Tahsin)
        - 38th Cavalry Regiment (Kaymakam İhsan)
        - 33rd Cavalry Regiment (Binbaşı Edip)
    - VI Corps (Mirliva Kâzım Pasha, CoS: Binbaşı Mehmed Nihat)
      - 16th Division (Miralay Ashir Bey, CoS: Binbaşı Ismail Hakki Bey)
        - 16th Brigade
          - 43rd Regiment (Kaymakam Mehmed Hayri)
          - 44th Regiment (Kaymakam Veysi Bey)
          - 46th Regiment (Kaymakam Ismail Hakki)
          - Artillery Regiment (Binbaşı Ali Nejded Bey)
      - 17th Division (Miralay Nureddin Bey, CoS: Mahmud Djelaleddin)
        - 17th Brigade (Miralay Ismail Rushdi Bey)
          - 62nd Regiment (Kaymakam Hasan Faik Bey)
          - 63rd Regiment (Kaymakam Abdulgani)
          - 47th Regiment (Osman Agha)
          - Artillery Regiment (Kaymakam Mehmed Ata Bey)

== See also ==
- Order of battle for the Battle of Sakarya

== Bibliography ==
- Celal Erikan, Komutan Atatürk, Cilt I-II, Üçüncü Basım, Türkiye İş Bankası Kültür Yayınları, İstanbul, 2001, ISBN 975-458-288-2, pp. 639–641. (in Turkish)
- Despotopoulos, Alexandros (1978). "Η Μικρασιατική Καταστροφή" [The Asia Minor Catastrophe]. Ιστορία του Ελληνικού Έθνους, Τόμος ΙΕ′: Νεώτερος ελληνισμός από το 1913 ως το 1941 [History of the Greek Nation, Volume XV: Modern Hellenism from 1913 to 1941] (in Greek). Ekdotiki Athinon A.E. pp. 200–233.
