= Battle of the Sakarya order of battle =

On August 23, 1921, during the Battle of the Sakarya, the opposing armies were deployed as follows:

== Greek order of battle ==
In late July 1921, Greek Army of Asia Minor (Greek: Στρατιά Μικράς Ασίας), under Lt. Gen. Anastasios Papoulas (chief of staff Col. Konstantinos Pallis), comprised:

- I Corps (Maj. Gen. Alexandros Kontoulis)
  - 1st Infantry Division (Col. Athanasios Frangou)
    - 4th Infantry Regiment
    - 5th Infantry Regiment
    - 1/38 Evzone Regiment
  - 2nd Infantry Division (Col. Georgios Valettas)
    - 1st Infantry Regiment
    - 7th Infantry Regiment
    - 34th Infantry Regiment
  - 12th Infantry Division (Col. Periklis Kallidopoulos)
    - 14th Infantry Regiment
    - 41st Infantry Regiment
    - 46th Infantry Regiment
  - Artillery Regiment
- II Corps (Prince Andrew of Greece)
  - 5th Infantry Division (Col. Ioannis Trilivas)
    - 33rd Infantry Regiment
    - 43rd Infantry Regiment
    - 44th Infantry Regiment
  - 9th Infantry Division (Col. Kimon Digenis)
    - 25th Infantry Regiment
    - 26th Infantry Regiment
    - 3/40 Evzone Regiment
  - 13th Infantry Division (Col. Andreas Kallinskis-Roïdis)
    - 3rd Infantry Regiment
    - 2nd Infantry Regiment
    - 5/42 Evzone Regiment
  - Artillery Regiment
  - Army Reserve Heavy Artillery Regiment
- III Corps (Maj. Gen. Georgios Polymenakos)
  - 3rd Infantry Division (Col. Georgios Nikolaidis)
    - 6th Infantry Regiment
    - 12th Infantry Regiment
    - 5/39 Evzone Regiment
  - 7th Infantry Division (Col. Andreas Platis)
    - 22nd Infantry Regiment
    - 23rd Infantry Regiment
    - 37th Infantry Regiment
  - 10th Infantry Division (Col. Petros Soumilas)
    - 27th Infantry Regiment
    - 28th Infantry Regiment
    - 30th Infantry Regiment
  - Artillery Regiment
  - 16th Infantry Regiment (detached from 11th Division)
  - Cavalry Brigade (Col. Panagiotis Nikolaidis)
    - 1st Cavalry Regiment
    - 3rd Cavalry Regiment
- Southern Group of Divisions (Maj. Gen. Nikolaos Trikoupis)
  - 4th Infantry Division (Col. Dimitrios Dimaras)
    - 8th Infantry Regiment
    - 11th Infantry Regiment
    - 35th Infantry Regiment
  - 11th Infantry Division (Col. Nikolaos Kladas)
    - 17th Infantry Regiment
    - 45th Infantry Regiment
- 9th Infantry Regiment
- 49th Infantry Regiment
- 18th Infantry Regiment
- 47th Infantry Regiment

== Turkish order of Battle ==
Commander in chief: Mirliva Mustafa Kemal Pasha

Chief of the General Staff: Birinci Ferik Mustafa Fevzi Pasha

Minister of National Defence: Mirliva Refet Pasha

- Western Front (Mirliva Ismet Pasha)
  - Cavalry Brigade
    - 21st Cavalry Regiment
    - Adatepe Cavalry
    - Militia Infantry
  - 2nd Cavalry Division (Kaymakam Edhem Servet Bey)
    - 2nd Cavalry Regiment
    - 4th Cavalry Regiment
    - 13th Cavalry Regiment
  - 3rd Cavalry Division (Kaymakam Ibrahim Bey)
    - 27th Cavalry Regiment
    - 28th Cavalry Regiment
  - Provisional Division (Kaymakam Ahmed Zeki Bey)
    - 35th Infantry Regiment
    - 52nd Infantry Regiment
    - 1st Militia Regiment
    - 2nd Militia Regiment
  - 3rd Caucasian Division (Kaymakam "Dadayli" Halid Bey)
    - 7th Infantry Regiment
    - 8th Infantry Regiment
    - 11th Infantry Regiment
  - 6th Division (Kaymakam Hussein Nazmi Bey)
    - 34th Infantry Regiment
    - 50th Infantry Regiment
    - 51st Infantry Regiment
    - 17th Stormtrooper Branch
    - 18th Stormtrooper Branch
    - 19th Stormtrooper Branch
    - 20th Stormtrooper Branch
  - 57th Division (Kaymakam Hasan Mumtaz Bey)
    - 37th Infantry Regiment
    - 39th Infantry Regiment
    - 176th Infantry Regiment
  - 29th Infantry Regiment
  - 47th Infantry Regiment
  - 48th Infantry Regiment
  - 49th Infantry Regiment
  - Artillery Regiment
  - Pioneer Battalion
  - Provisional Group (Miralay Kâzım "Köprülü" Bey)
    - 1st Cavalry Division (Kaymakam Osman Zati Bey)
      - 10 Cavalry Regiment
      - 11 Cavalry Regiment
      - 14 Cavalry Regiment
    - 1st Division (Kaymakam Abdul Rahman Nafiz Bey)
      - 3rd Infantry Regiment
      - 4th Infantry Regiment
      - 5th Infantry Regiment
    - 17th Division (Miralay Hussein Nureddin Bey)
      - 61st Infantry Regiment
      - 62nd Infantry Regiment
      - 63rd Infantry Regiment
    - 41st Division (Kaymakam Sherif Bey)
      - 12th Infantry Regiment
      - 16th Infantry Regiment
      - 19th Infantry Regiment
  - XII Group (Miralay "Deli" Halid Bey)
    - 11th Division (Miralay Abdul Rezzak Bey)
      - 170th Infantry Regiment
      - 126th Infantry Regiment
      - 127th Infantry Regiment
  - IV Group (Miralay Kemaleddin Sami Bey)
    - 5th Caucasian Division (Kaymakam Djemil Djahid Bey)
      - 9th Infantry Regiment
      - 10th Infantry Regiment
      - 13th Infantry Regiment
    - 61st Division (Miralay Mehmed Rushdi Bey)
      - 159th Infantry Regiment
      - 174th Infantry Regiment
      - 190th Infantry Regiment
  - III Group (Mirliva Yusuf Izzet Pasha)
    - 7th Division (Kaymakam Ahmed Dervish Bey)
      - 2nd Infantry Regiment
      - 23rd Infantry Regiment
      - 41st Infantry Regiment
    - 8th Division (Miralay Kiazim Bey)
      - 131st Infantry Regiment
      - 135th Infantry Regiment
      - 189th Infantry Regiment
    - 15th Division (Miralay Shukri Naili Bey)
      - 38th Infantry Regiment
      - 48th Infantry Regiment
      - 56th Infantry Regiment
  - II Group (Miralay Selâhaddin Âdil Bey)
    - 4th Division (Miralay Mehmed Sabri Bey)
      - 40th Infantry Regiment
      - 42nd Infantry Regiment
      - 58th Infantry Regiment
    - 5th Division (Kaymakam Kenan Bey)
      - 14th Infantry Regiment
      - 15th Infantry Regiment
      - 24th Infantry Regiment
    - 9th Division (Miralay Sidqi Bey)
      - 25th Infantry Regiment
      - 26th Infantry Regiment
      - 27th Infantry Regiment
  - I Group (Miralay Izzeddin Bey)
    - 23rd Division (Kaymakam Bıyıklıoğlu Omer Halis Bey)
      - 31st Infantry Regiment
      - 68th Infantry Regiment
      - 69th Infantry Regiment
    - 24th Division (Kaymakam Ahmed Fuad Bey)
      - 30th Infantry Regiment
      - 31st Infantry Regiment
      - 32nd Infantry Regiment
  - V Group (Cavalry) (Miralay Fahreddin Bey)
    - 14th Cavalry Division (Kaymakam Mehmed Subhi Bey)
      - 3rd Cavalry Regiment
      - 54th Cavalry Regiment
      - 55th Cavalry Regiment
    - 4th Cavalry Division (Kaymakam Arif Bey)
      - 5th Cavalry Regiment
      - 20th Cavalry Regiment

== See also ==
- Order of battle for the Battle of Dumlupınar

== Bibliography ==
- Celal Erikan, Komutan Atatürk, Cilt I-II, Üçüncü Basım, Türkiye İş Bankası Kültür Yayınları, İstanbul, 2001, ISBN 975-458-288-2, pp. 520–522. (in Turkish)
- Türk İstiklâl Harbi: Sakarya Meydan Muharebesi ve Sonraki Harekât, II nci cilt, 5 nci kısım, 2 nci kitap, Genelkurmay Baskanlığı Harbi Tarihi Dairesi Resmî Yayınları, 1973, pp. 516–517. (in Turkish)
