= Battle of Megiddo (1918) order of battle =

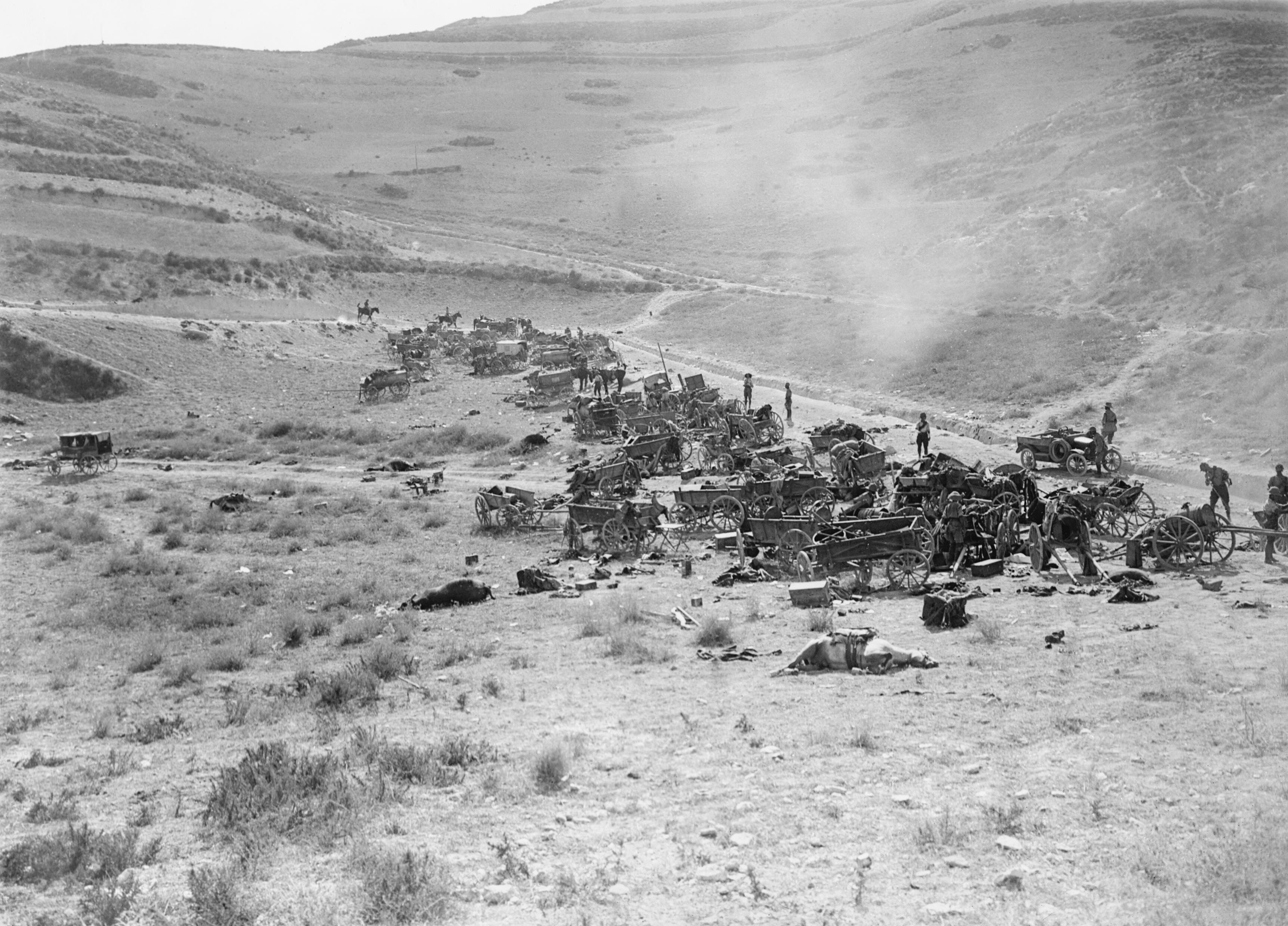
Yildirim Army Group carts and gun carriages destroyed by EEF aircraft on the Nablus-Beisan road

This is the order of battle for the Battle of Megiddo (1918), the concluding engagement of the Sinai and Palestine Campaign of the First World War. The Entente's Egyptian Expeditionary Force, commanded by General Edmund Allenby and composed mainly of British, Indian, Australian and New Zealand troops, with a small French and Armenian contingent, cooperated with the Arab Northern Army, which was part of the Arab Revolt and was under the overall command of the Emir Feisal, in an all-out offensive against the Yıldırım Army Group, part of the army of the Ottoman Empire.

After preliminary attacks beginning late on 16 September 1918, Allenby's main attack overran the Ottoman front lines on 19 September. British Indian Army and Australian mounted divisions seized objectives far behind the front line, while British and Australian aircraft crippled the Ottoman armies' headquarters and attacked retreating Ottoman troops, turning their retreat into a rout.

Most of the Ottoman formations were destroyed by 26 September. Allenby's mounted divisions and Arab irregulars captured Damascus on 1 October. The surviving Ottoman troops were pursued to Aleppo, and the war in the Middle East ended on 31 October.

== Order of battle ==
On 17 September 1918, the opposing armies in Palestine, Trans Jordan and Syria were deployed as follows:

=== Ottoman ===
Yildirim Army Group (Otto Liman von Sanders)

- Eighth Army (Jevad Pasha) — Tulkarm
  - XXII Corps (Refet Bey)
    - 46th Division (Shefik Avni Bey) (recently arrived at Tyre)
    - 7th Division (Nasuhi Bey)
    - 20th Division (Veysel Bey)
  - Asia Korps (Oberst Gustav von Oppen) also named Left Wing Group
    - 19th Division (Sami Sabit Bey)
    - 16th Division (Rushdi Bey)
    - German "Pasha II" detachment (regiment)
  - 2nd Caucasian Cavalry Division
- Seventh Army (Mustafa Kemal Pasha) — Nablus
  - III Corps (Ismet Bey)
    - 1st Division (Hans Guhr Bey)
    - 11th Division (Kiazim Bey)
  - XX Corps (Ali Fuad Pasha)
    - 26th Division (Mehmed Hayri Bey)
    - 53rd Division (Reshad Bey)
    - German 146th Infantry Regiment
- Fourth Army (Mersinli Djemal Pasha, "the Lesser") – Es Salt
  - VIII Corps (Jordan River) (Yasin Hilmi Bey, also known as Salman el-Hashimi)
    - 48th Division (Âsım Bey)
    - Composite Division (Hussein Nureddin Bey)
  - II Corps (Galatali Shevket Bey)
    - Jordan Group (Amman)
      - 24th Division
      - 3rd Cavalry Division (Esad Bey)
    - Ma'an and Hauran detachment
      - 62nd Division
      - Three composite detachments
- 43rd Division (arrived Beirut early October)

=== Allied ===
Egyptian Expeditionary Force (General Edmund Allenby)

Chief of Staff – Lieutenant General Louis Bols

- XXI Corps (Lieutenant General Edward Bulfin) — main attack
  - Corps Cavalry Regiment (3 mixed squadrons Yeomanry)
  - Royal Garrison Artillery (5 Heavy Batteries, 12 Siege Batteries, 6 Mountain Batteries)
  - 60th Division (Major General J.S.M. Shea)
    - 179th, 180th, 181st Brigades
  - 7th (Meerut) Division (Major General V.B. Fane)
    - 19th (Dehra Dun), 21st (Bareilly), 28th Brigades
  - 75th Division (Major General P.C. Palin)
    - 232nd, 233rd, 234th Brigades
  - 3rd (Lahore) Division (Major General A.R. Hoskins)
    - 7th (Ferozepur), 8th (Jullundur), 9th (Sirhind) Brigades
  - 54th (East Anglian) Division (Major General S.W. Hare)
    - 161st, 162nd, 163rd Brigades
    - Détachement Français de Palestine et de Syrie (including French Armenian Legion)
- XX Corps (Lieutenant General Philip Chetwode) — subsidiary attack
  - 1/1 Worcestershire Yeomanry
  - Royal Garrison Artillery (1 Heavy Battery, 6 Siege Batteries)
  - 1 Indian Mountain Battery, Hong Kong and Singapore Mountain Battery
  - 10th (Irish) Division (Major General J.R. Longley)
    - 29th, 30th, 31st Brigades
  - 53rd Division (Major General S.F. Mott)
    - 158th, 159th, 160th Brigades
- Chaytor's Force (Major General Edward Chaytor) — eastern flank
  - Anzac Mounted Division (Major General Edward Chaytor)
    - 1st Australian Mounted, 2nd Australian Mounted, New Zealand Mounted Rifles Brigades
  - 20th Indian Brigade (Brigadier General E.R.B. Murray)
    - West India Regiment (two battalions)
    - Jewish Legion (38th & 39th Battalions Royal Fusiliers)
    - 1 attached Field Battery, 1 Heavy Battery, 2 Indian Mountain Batteries
- Desert Mounted Corps (Lieutenant General Harry Chauvel) — exploitation
  - 2 Light Armoured Motor Batteries, Machine Gun Corps (Armoured cars), 2 Light Car Patrols
  - 4th Cavalry Division (Major General G. de S. Barrow)
    - 10th Cavalry, 11th Cavalry, 12th Cavalry Brigades
  - 5th Cavalry Division (Major General H. A. Macandrew)
    - 13th Cavalry, 14th Cavalry, 15th (Imperial Service) Cavalry Brigades
  - Australian Mounted Division (Major General Henry West Hodgson)
    - 3rd Australian Light Horse, 4th Australian Light Horse, 5th Australian Light Horse Brigades
- RAF Palestine Brigade (Brigadier-General Amyas Borton)
  - Fifth (Corps) Wing (Lieutenant-Colonel Charles Burnett)
    - No. 14 Squadron
    - No. 113 Squadron
    - No. 142 Squadron
  - Fortieth (Army) Wing (Lieutenant-Colonel Richard Williams)
    - No. 1 Squadron Australian Flying Corps
    - No. 111 Squadron RAF
    - No. 144 Squadron RAF
    - No. 145 Squadron (1 flight only)

Arab forces

Arab Northern Army (Emir Feisal)

- Regular Forces (Jafar Pasha el-Askari)
  - 1st Division (Aqaba) (Brigadier General Amin al-Asil)
    - Hashemite Infantry Brigade (800)
  - 2nd Division (Quwayra) (Lieutenant Colonel Majid Hasun)
    - Hashemite Infantry Brigade (800)
  - Hejaz Camel Corps battalion (400) (part of T. E. Lawrence's detachment)
  - Small artillery, machine gun, mule-mounted infantry, medical and logistical detachments
- Irregular Forces
  - Howeitat, Bani 'Ali, Bali, Juhaynah, Utaybah bedouin (Nuri as-Said, Auda abu Tayi and others)
  - Haurani and Druze insurgents
