= Münip Uzsoy =

Officer of the Ottoman Army and the Turkish Army

Münip Uzsoy 1311-b-P. 32
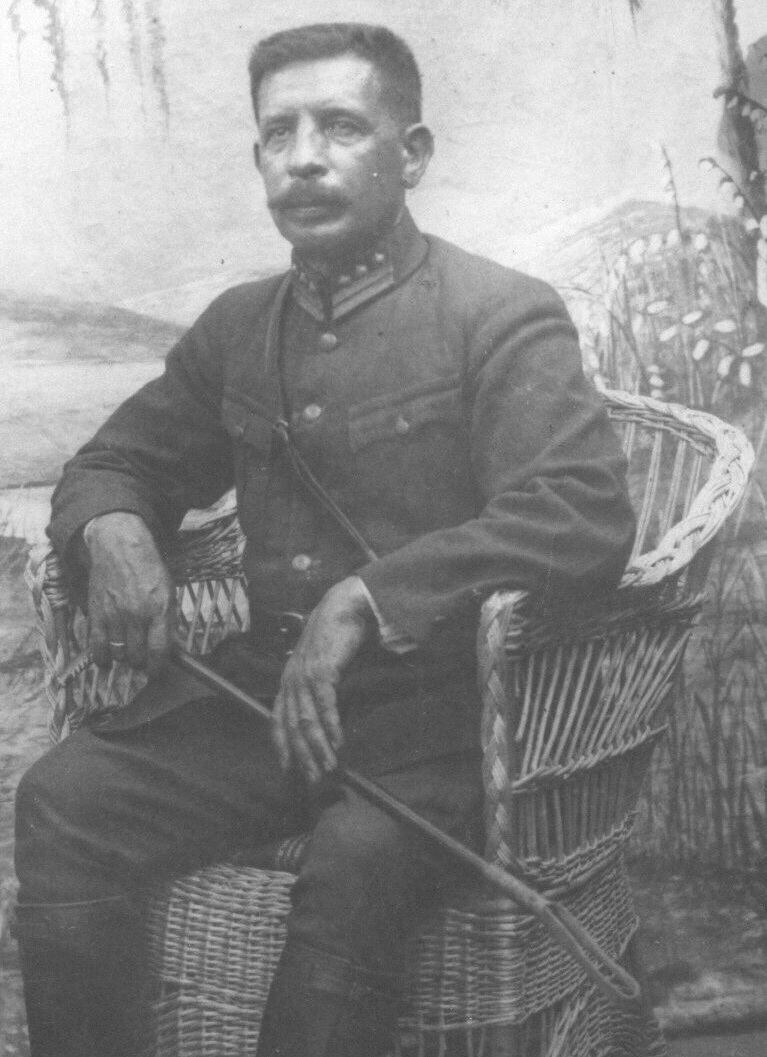
- Born: 1878; Constantinople (Istanbul), Ottoman Empire
- Died: 29 July 1950 (aged 71–72); Istanbul, Turkey
- Burial place: State Cemetery
- Military career
- Allegiance: Ottoman Empire; Turkey
- Service years: Ottoman Empire: 1895–March 1920; Turkey: May 4, 1921 – February 25, 1931
- Rank: Colonel
- Commands: 36th Regiment, 178th Regiment, 140th Regiment, Chief of the Supply of the Fourth Army; Infantry Brigade of the 24th Division, 61st Division, Polatlı Area, Chief of the Ankara Military Court for Field officers and Company-grade officers, Chief of the Manisa Military Department
- Conflicts: Greco-Turkish War; Balkan Wars; First World War; Turkish War of Independence

Münip Uzsoy (1878; Constantinople (Istanbul) – 29 July 1950; Istanbul) was an officer of the Ottoman Army and the Turkish Army. The family name is often listed as "Özsoy", and occasionally as "Urgay".

== Medals and decorations ==
- Order of the Medjidie 5th class
- Order of Osmanieh 4th class
- Medal of the Battle of Greece
- Gallipoli Star (Ottoman Empire)
- Silver Medal of Liyakat
- Silver Medal of Imtiyaz
- Prussia Iron Cross 1st and 2nd class
- Medal of Independence with Red Ribbon

== See also ==
- List of high-ranking commanders of the Turkish War of Independence
