= Mehmet Hulusi Conk =

Ottoman Army officer

Mehmet Hulusi Conk 1318-P. 24
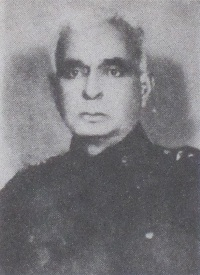
- Born: 1881; Smyrna (İzmir), Aidin Vilayet, Ottoman Empire
- Died: 10 January 1950 (aged 68–69); Istanbul, Turkey
- Burial place: State Cemetery
- Military career
- Allegiance: Ottoman Empire; Turkey
- Service years: Ottoman: January 1901–1920; Turkey: 1920 – January 3, 1923; January 31, 1942 – August 21, 1943
- Rank: Miralay
- Commands: Chief of Staff of the XVII Corps, Chief of Staff of the XIX Corps, Chief of Staff of the XIV Corps, 176th Regiment, 60th Division, 61st Division, Chief of Staff of the XX Corps; Army Office of the Ministry of National Defense, 24th Division, 18th Division; Manisa Military Service Department
- Conflicts: Balkan Wars; World War I Turkish War of Independence

Mehmet Hulusi Conk (1881 – January 10, 1950) was an officer of the Ottoman Army and the Turkish Army. He is known for his achievements during the Gallipoli campaign of World War I and later during the Turkish War of Independence where he joined the forces of Mustafa Kemal and fought against the Greeks and the Allies.

== Medals and decorations ==
- Silver Medal of Liyakat
- Silver Medal of Imtiyaz
- Prussia Iron Cross
- Medal of Independence with Red Ribbon

== See also ==
- List of high-ranking commanders of the Turkish War of Independence
