= Veysel Özgür =

Turkish soldier

Veysel Özgür 1311-b-P. 83
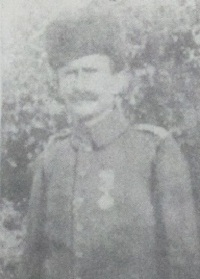
- Born: Trabzon, Ottoman Empire
- Died: 15 October 1931 (aged 53–54) ?, Turkey
- Burial place: State Cemetery
- Military career
- Allegiance: Ottoman Empire; Turkey
- Service years: Ottoman: 1895 – March 1920; Turkey: October 28, 1920 – March 26, 1924
- Rank: Miralay
- Commands: 15th Regiment, 161st Regiment, 134th Regiment, 48th Division, Humus Area, 20th Division, 1st Division; 15th Division, Provisional Division of Kocaeli Group, 7th Division, Çorum Military Service Department, Chief of the Military Court for Field officers of the VII Corps
- Conflicts: Balkan Wars; First World War; Turkish War of Independence

Veysel Özgür (1877 in Trabzon – October 15, 1931) was an officer of the Ottoman Army and the Turkish Army.

== Medals and decorations ==
- Gallipoli Star (Ottoman Empire)
- Silver Medal of Liyakat
- Silver Medal of Imtiyaz
- Prussia Iron Cross 2nd class
- Medal of Independence with Red Ribbon

== See also ==
- List of high-ranking commanders of the Turkish War of Independence
