= Nazif Kayacık =

Officer of the Ottoman Army and a general of the Turkish Army

Nazif Kayacık 1306-P. 29
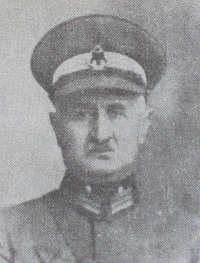
- Born: 1872; Constantinople, Ottoman Empire
- Died: 20 March 1951 (aged 78–79); Istanbul, Turkey
- Burial place: Feriköy Mezarlığı; State Cemetery
- Military career
- Allegiance: Ottoman Empire; Turkey
- Service years: Ottoman: 1888–1921; Turkey: 31 August 1921 – 17 September 1930
- Rank: Mirliva
- Commands: Provisional Regiment of the 9th Division, 5th Regiment, Saros Group, 6th Division, General Inspector of the Depot units 3rd Caucasian Division, Chief of Konya Military Courts, Inspector of the Depot units
- Conflicts: Greco-Turkish War; Italo-Turkish War; Balkan Wars; First World War; Turkish War of Independence

Nazif Kayacık (1872 – 20 March 1951) was an officer of the Ottoman Army and a general of the Turkish Army.

== Medals and decorations ==
- Order of the Medjidie
- Order of Osminieh
- Silver Medal of the Battle of Greece
- Silver Medal of Liyakat
- Gallipoli Star (Ottoman Empire)
- Silver Medal of Imtiyaz
- Iron Cross
- Order of the Iron Crown (Austria)
- Medal of Independence with Red Ribbon & Citation

== See also ==
- List of high-ranking commanders of the Turkish War of Independence
