= Şerif Yaçağaz =

Şerif Yaçağaz 1314-c-P. 94
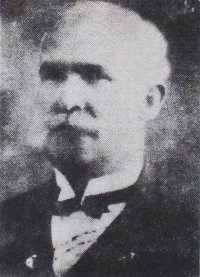
- Born: 1876; Pazardzhik, Ottoman Empire
- Died: 5 October 1938 (aged 61–62)
- Burial place: State Cemetery
- Military career
- Allegiance: Ottoman Empire; Turkey
- Service years: Ottoman Empire: 1899–1920; Turkey: 1920–July 17, 1923
- Rank: Brigadier
- Commands: 161st Regiment, Istanbul Central Command (vice); Yozgat Area Command, Mutasarrif of Yozgat, 41st Division, 2nd Division, Istanbul Central Command
- Conflicts: Balkan Wars; First World War; Turkish War of Independence

Şerif Yaçağaz (1876 – 5 October 1938) was a Turkish career officer, civil servant and antisemitic politician, who served as an officer in the Ottoman Army and the Turkish Army. His antisemitic and anti-communist lectures drew the attention of Turkish nationalist Nihâl Atsız.

== Medals and decorations ==
- Order of Osminieh with Sword
- Order of the Medjidie
- Gallipoli Star (Ottoman Empire)
- Silver Medal of Liyakat
- Silver Medal of Imtiyaz
- Medal of Independence with Red Ribbon

== See also ==
- List of high-ranking commanders of the Turkish War of Independence
