= Mümtaz Çeçen =

Officer of the Ottoman Army and the Turkish Army

Mümtaz Çeçen 1309-P. 99
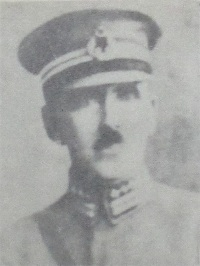
- Born: 1876; Constantinople (Istanbul), Ottoman Empire
- Died: November 3, 1941 (aged 64–65); Istanbul, Turkey
- Burial place: State Cemetery
- Military career
- Allegiance: Ottoman Empire; Turkey
- Service years: Ottoman: 1893–1919; Turkey: 1919–February 25, 1931
- Rank: Major general
- Commands: 111th Regiment, Samsun Training Regiment; 11th Division, 57th Division, Inspector of the Thrace Gendarmerie Area, member of the Military Court No. 2 of the Ministry of National Defense
- Conflicts: Greco-Turkish War; Italo-Turkish War; Balkan Wars; First World War; Turkish War of Independence

Mümtaz Çeçen (1876 – 3 November 1941) was an officer of the Ottoman Army and the Turkish Army.

== Medals and decorations ==
- Order of the Medjidie 4th and 5th class
- Imtiyaz Medal of the Battle of Greece
- Silver Liakat Medal
- Silver Imtiyaz Medal
- Iron Cross of 1914, 1st and 2nd class (Prussia)
- Medal of Independence with Red Ribbon

== See also ==
- List of high-ranking commanders of the Turkish War of Independence
