= Arif Örgüç =

Army officer

Hacı Arif Örgüç 1311-c-Sv. 69
- Born: 1876; Constantinople (Istanbul), Ottoman Empire
- Died: April 1940 (aged 63–64); Istanbul, Turkey
- Burial place: State Cemetery
- Military career
- Allegiance: Ottoman Empire; Turkey
- Service years: Ottoman: 1896–March 1921; Turkey: January 1921 – February 9, 1926
- Rank: Miralay
- Commands: 14th Cavalry Regiment, 13th Provisional Cavalry Regiment, 13th Cavalry Regiment, Kurdistan Detachment of XIII Corps; Cavalry Depot Regiment of Western Front, 5th Cavalry Brigade, 1st Cavalry Division, Provisional Cavalry Division, 1st Cavalry Division
- Conflicts: Italo-Turkish War; Balkan Wars; First World War; Turkish War of Independence

Arif Örgüç, also known as Mehmet Arif Örgüç, Hacı Arif Örgüç (1876 in Constantinople (Istanbul) – April 1940 in Istanbul) was an officer of the Ottoman Army and the Turkish Army.

== Medals and decorations ==
- Order of the Medjidie
- Gallipoli Star (Ottoman Empire)
- Silver Medal of Liyakat
- Silver Medal of Imtiyaz
- Medal of Independence with Red Ribbon

== See also ==
- List of high-ranking commanders of the Turkish War of Independence
