= Ethem Servet Boral =

Ethem Servet Boral 1315-P. 16
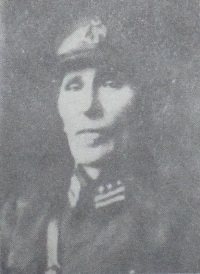
- Ethem Servet Boral
- Born: 1876; Caucasus, Russian Empire
- Died: 21 September 1956 (aged 79–80) ?, Turkey
- Burial place: State Cemetery
- Military career
- Allegiance: Ottoman Empire; Turkey
- Service years: Ottoman: January 1900-1920; Turkey: July 1, 1920-February 25, 1931
- Rank: Miralay
- Commands: Commissariat of the Greek Border, 14th Regiment; Committee of the Purchase of Minister of National Defense, Supply General Command, 2nd Cavalry Division, Department of Inspection, member of the Military Court of Cassation, Geography Committee of the General Staff
- Conflicts: Balkan Wars; First World War; Turkish War of Independence

Ethem Servet Boral (1876, in Caucasus – September 21, 1956?) was an officer of the Ottoman Army and the Turkish Army.

== Medals and decorations ==
- Order of Osmanieh 4th class
- Order of the Medjidie 4th class
- Gold Liakat Medal
- Prussian Military Medal
- Prussian Medal of Merit
- Medal of Independence with Red Ribbon

== See also ==
- List of high-ranking commanders of the Turkish War of Independence
