= İbrahim Çolak =

İbrahim Çolak may refer to:

- İbrahim Çolak (officer) (1881–1944), an officer of the Ottoman Army and the Turkish Army
- İbrahim Çolak (gymnast) (born 1995), Turkish artistic gymnast
