= Turkish State Cemetery =

National and military cemetery in Ankara, Turkey

- Devlet Mezarlığı
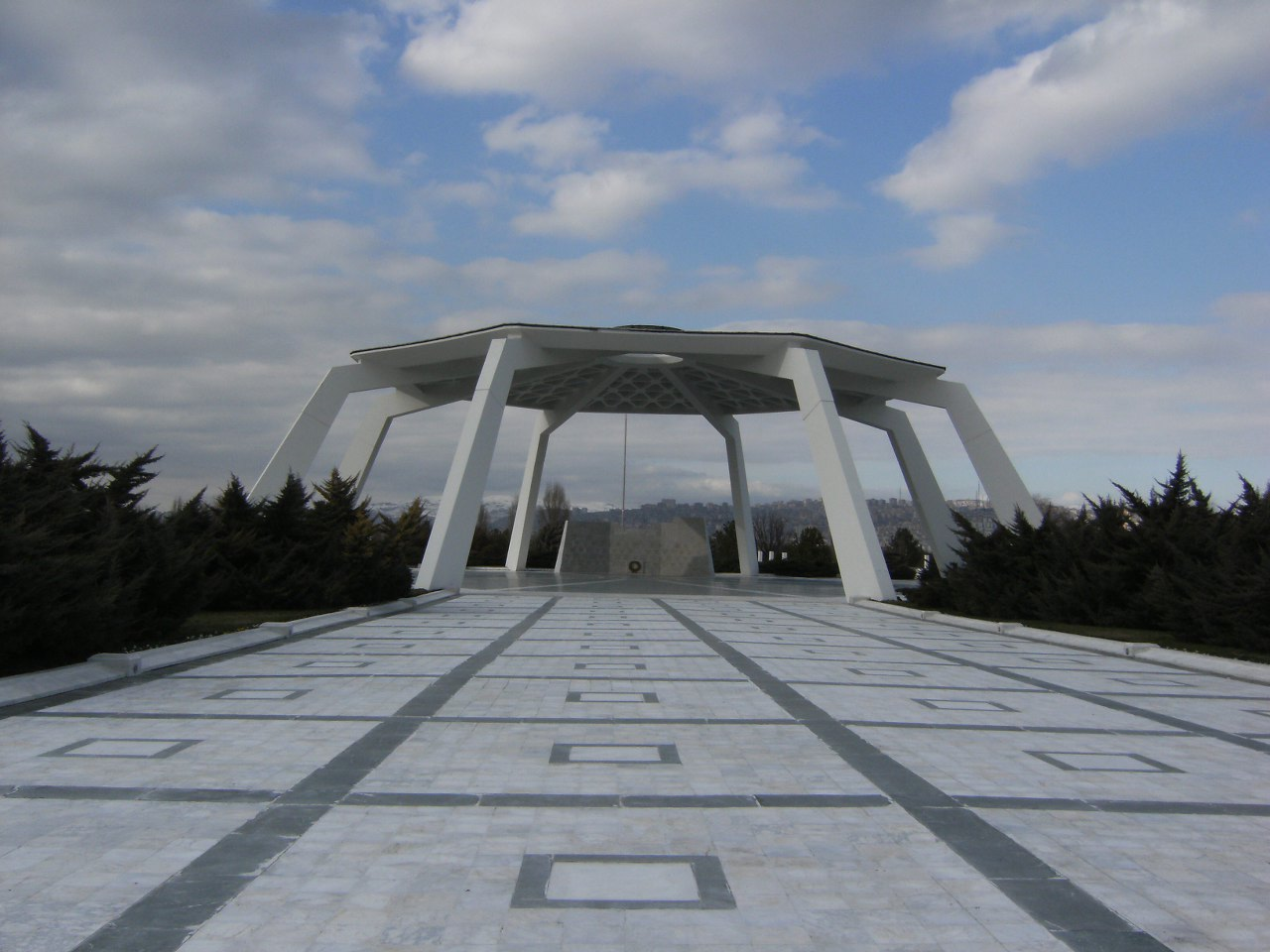
- Otağ (marquee) in the State cemetery.
- Interactive map of Turkish State Cemetery

Details
- Established: August 30, 1988; 37 years ago
- Location: Ankara
- Country: Turkey
- Coordinates: 39°56′13″N 32°48′26″E
- Type: Military, national

The Turkish State Cemetery (Turkish: Devlet Mezarlığı) is a national and military cemetery in Ankara, Turkey, containing the graves of the presidents of Turkey and the high-ranked, close companions-in-arms of Mustafa Kemal Atatürk, the founder of the Republic of Turkey, in the Turkish War of Independence.

== History ==
The cemetery was established upon an act dated November 10, 1981. It is situated around the "Karadeniz Havuzu" (Black Sea Pool) on the grounds of the historical "Atatürk Orman Çiftliği" (Atatürk Forest Ranch) in Ankara. The architect Özgür Ecevit and the agronomist Ekrem Gürenli, who won the contest organized by the Ministry of National Defense in 1982, designed the state cemetery.

It was opened on August 30, 1988 with a state funeral ceremony for the transferred bodies of two presidents, Cemal Gürsel and Cevdet Sunay, and of 61 commanders of the War of Independence. At the opening ceremony were present, President Kenan Evren, Prime Minister Turgut Özal, and leaders of the political parties represented in the parliament, Erdal İnönü (SHP) and Süleyman Demirel (DYP), and members of the President's Council.

The cemetery is administered by the Ministry of National Defense.

== The memorial park ==
It is memorial park with an area of 536,000 m² open to the public, of which 180,000 m² is planned and the remaining is green area. The Black Sea Pool, built in 1931 by the order of Atatürk, was restored during the establishment of the state cemetery. The surrounding area of the pool serves today as a recreational park.

A road within the cemetery flanked by marble sculptures, called "Cumhuriyet Tarihi Yolu" (History of the Republic Road), is dedicated to the milestones in the era of the rebirth of the nation. This collection of artworks features the first-ever large-scale sculpture arrangement in Turkey. The road starts with a statue symbolizing the beginning of the War of Independence by landing Atatürk’s in Samsun on May 19, 1919. Sculptures remembering the congresses in Erzurum and Sivas, establishment of the new parliament in Ankara follow. In the section of wars, 5 columns stand in the water with inscriptions from the "Büyük Söylev" (Grand Speech) of Atatürk. A sculpture erected for the Peace Treaty of Lausanne accomplishes this section. Reliefs on both sides of the road in this section describe the foundation of the regular armed forces, First and Second İnönü Battles, Battle of the Sakarya and the Battle of Dumlupınar. The last artwork is a single abstract sculpture symbolizing the abolition of the office of caliphate by the republic. A team of Turkish sculptors led by the renowned artist Rahmi Aksungur created the artworks.

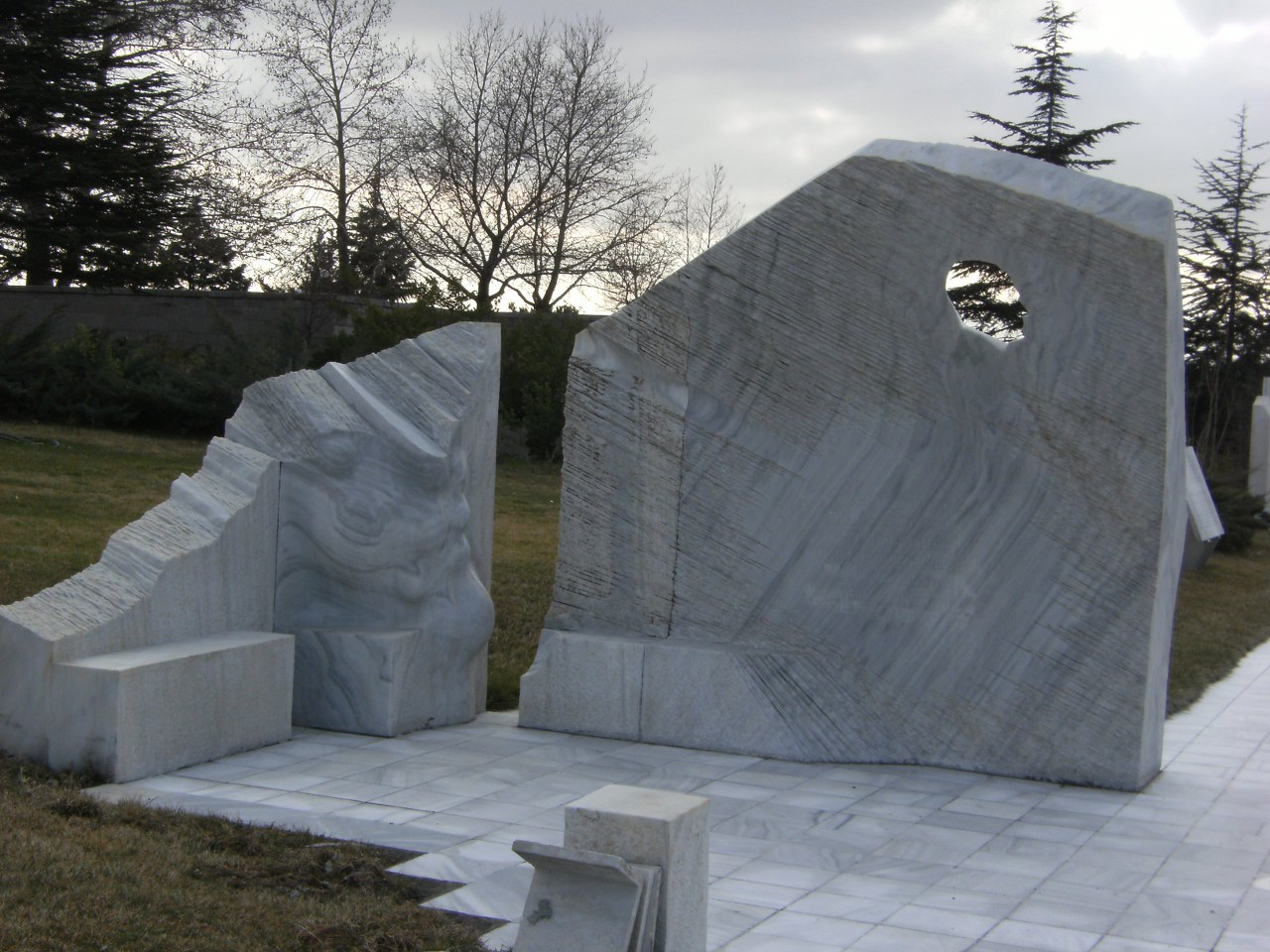
a statue symbolizing the beginning of the War of Independence by landing Atatürk’s in Samsun on May 19, 1919

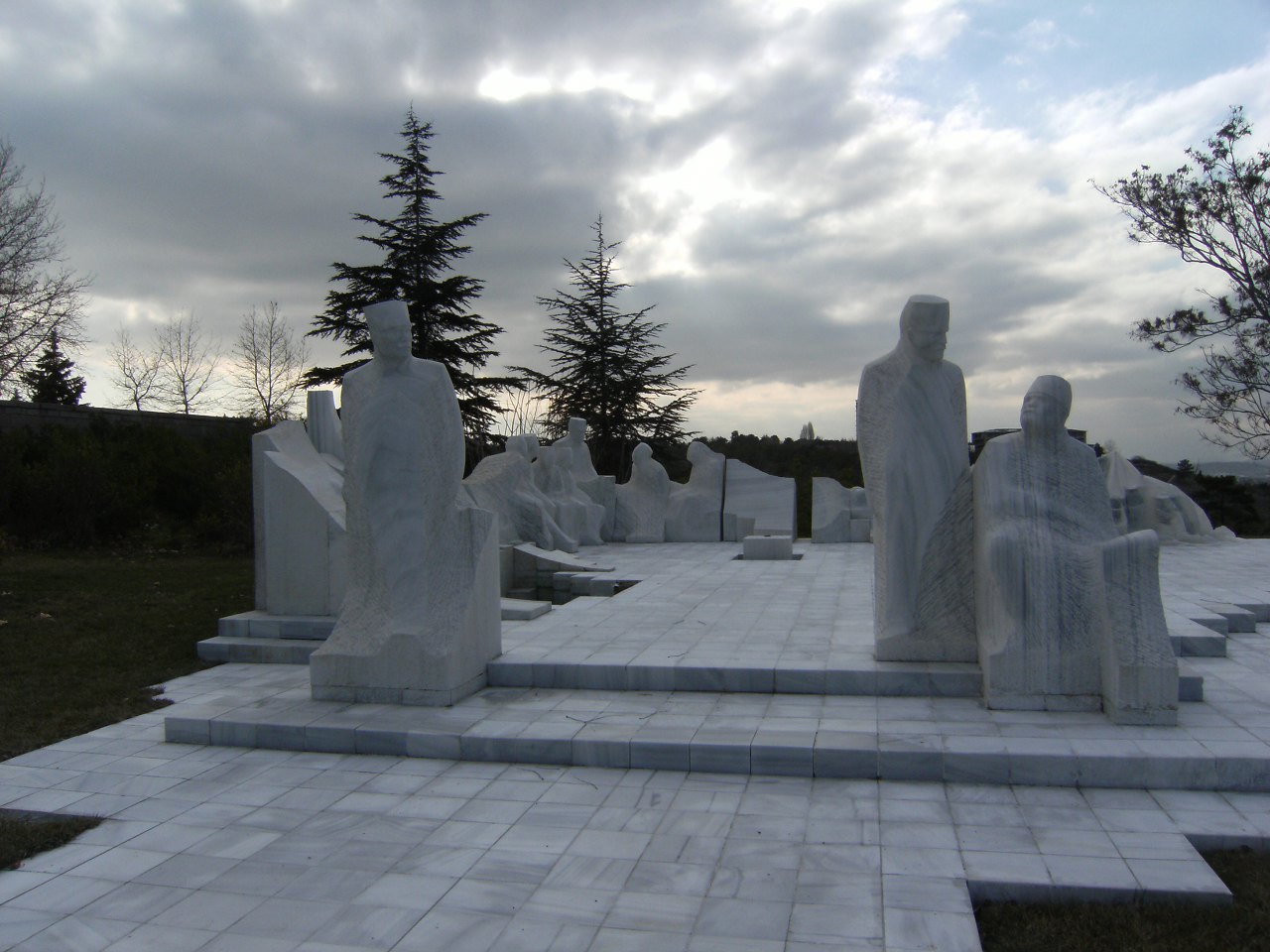
Congresses section

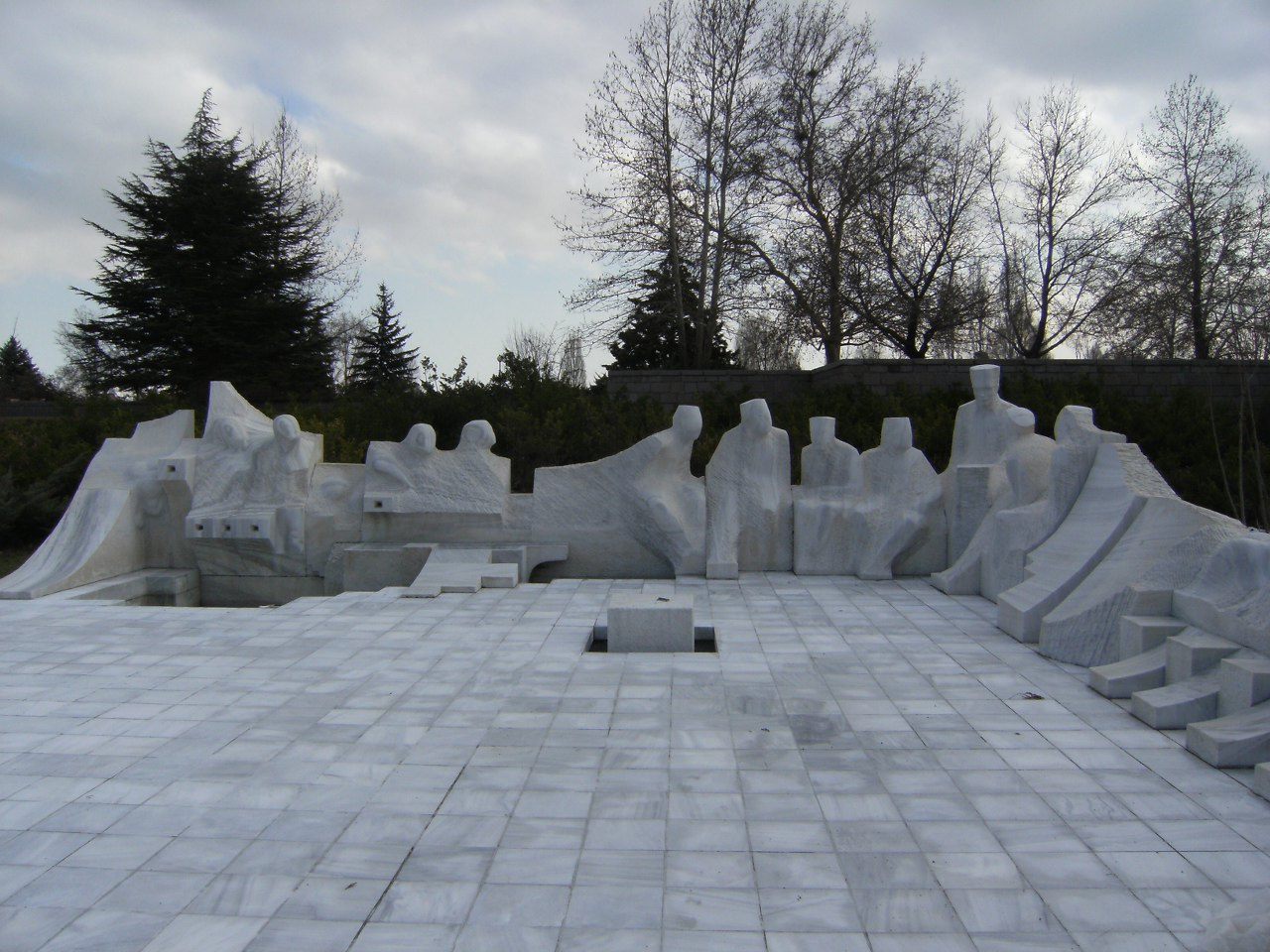
Congresses section

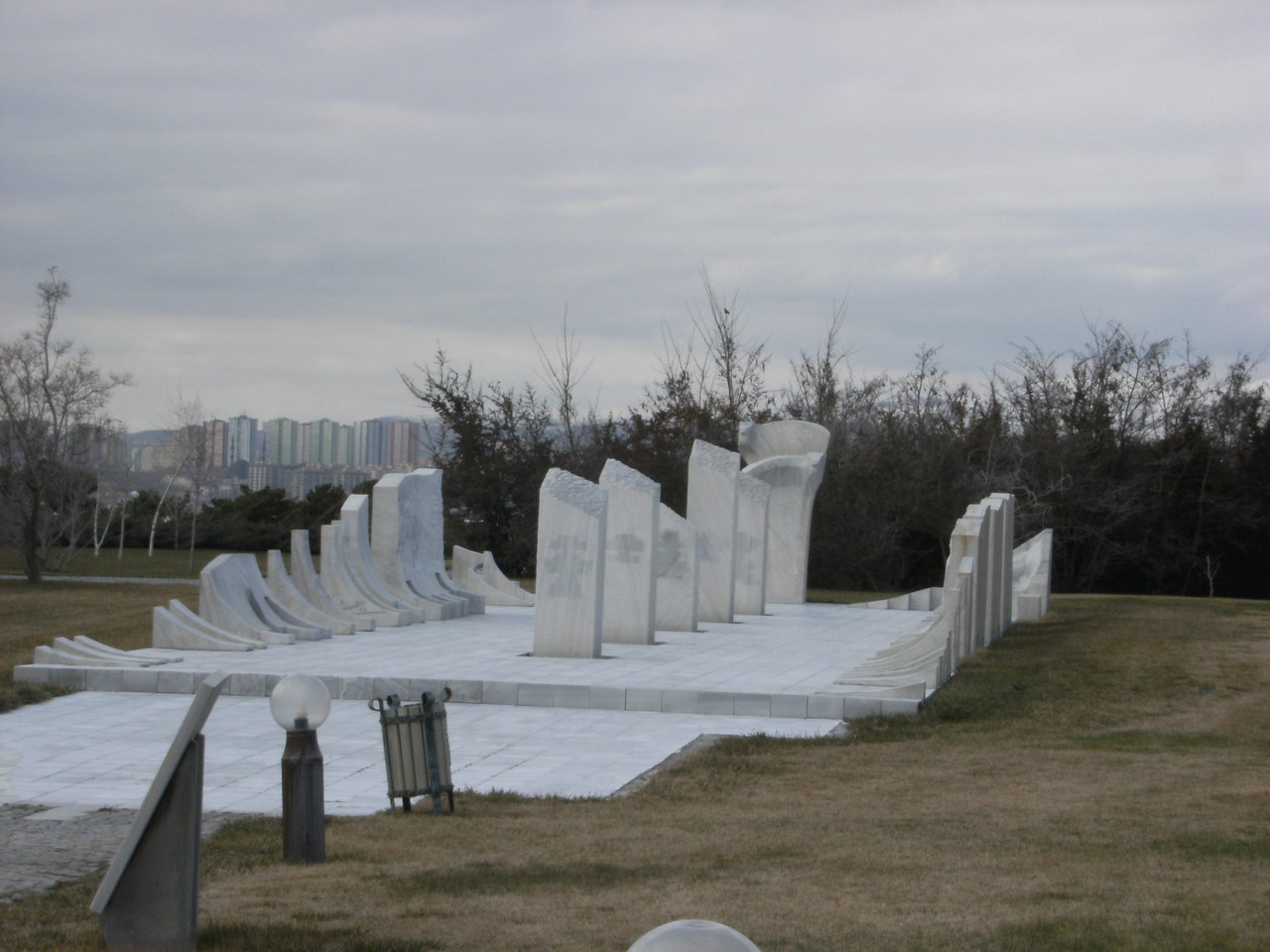
Battles section

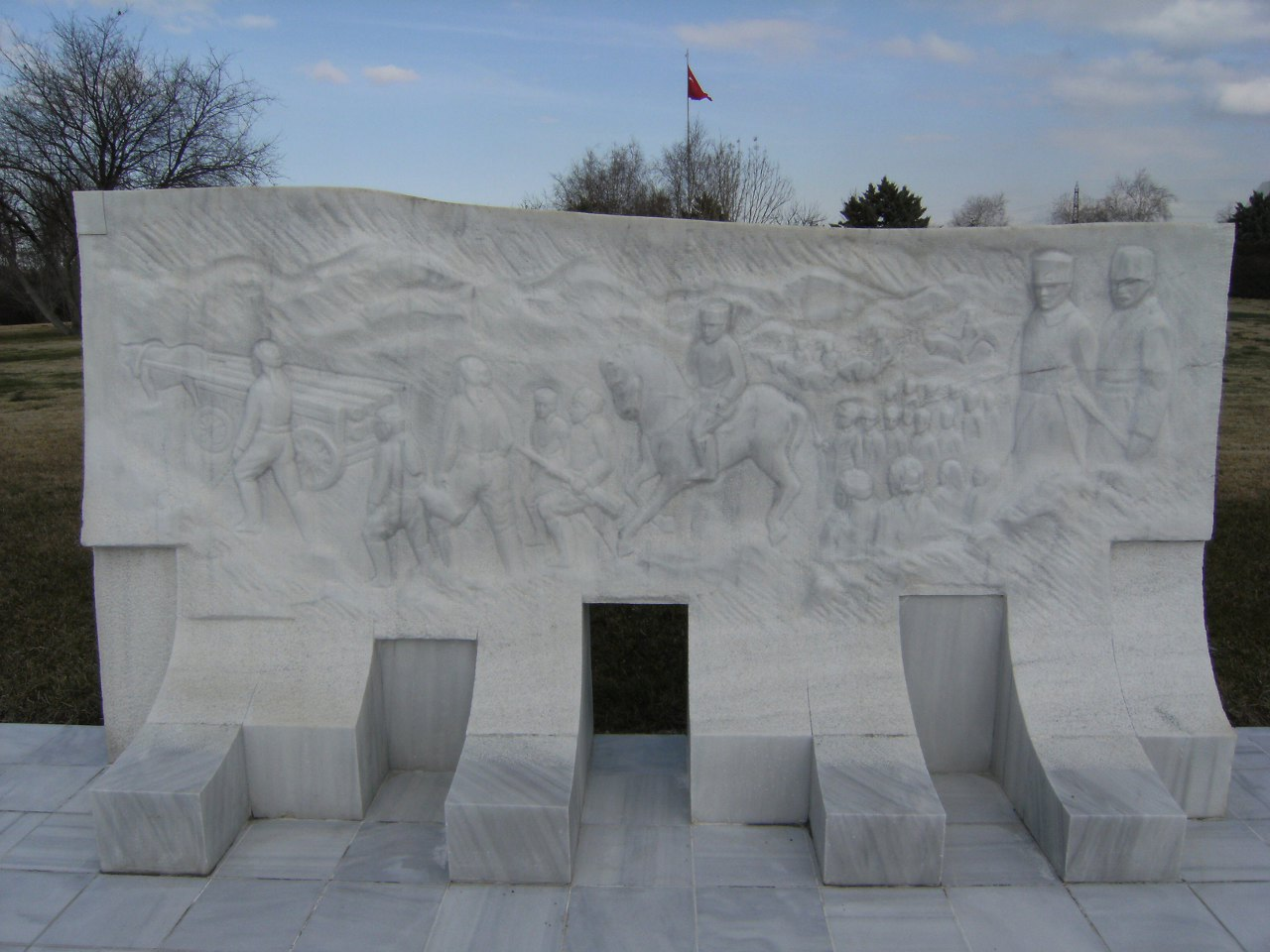
Battles section relief

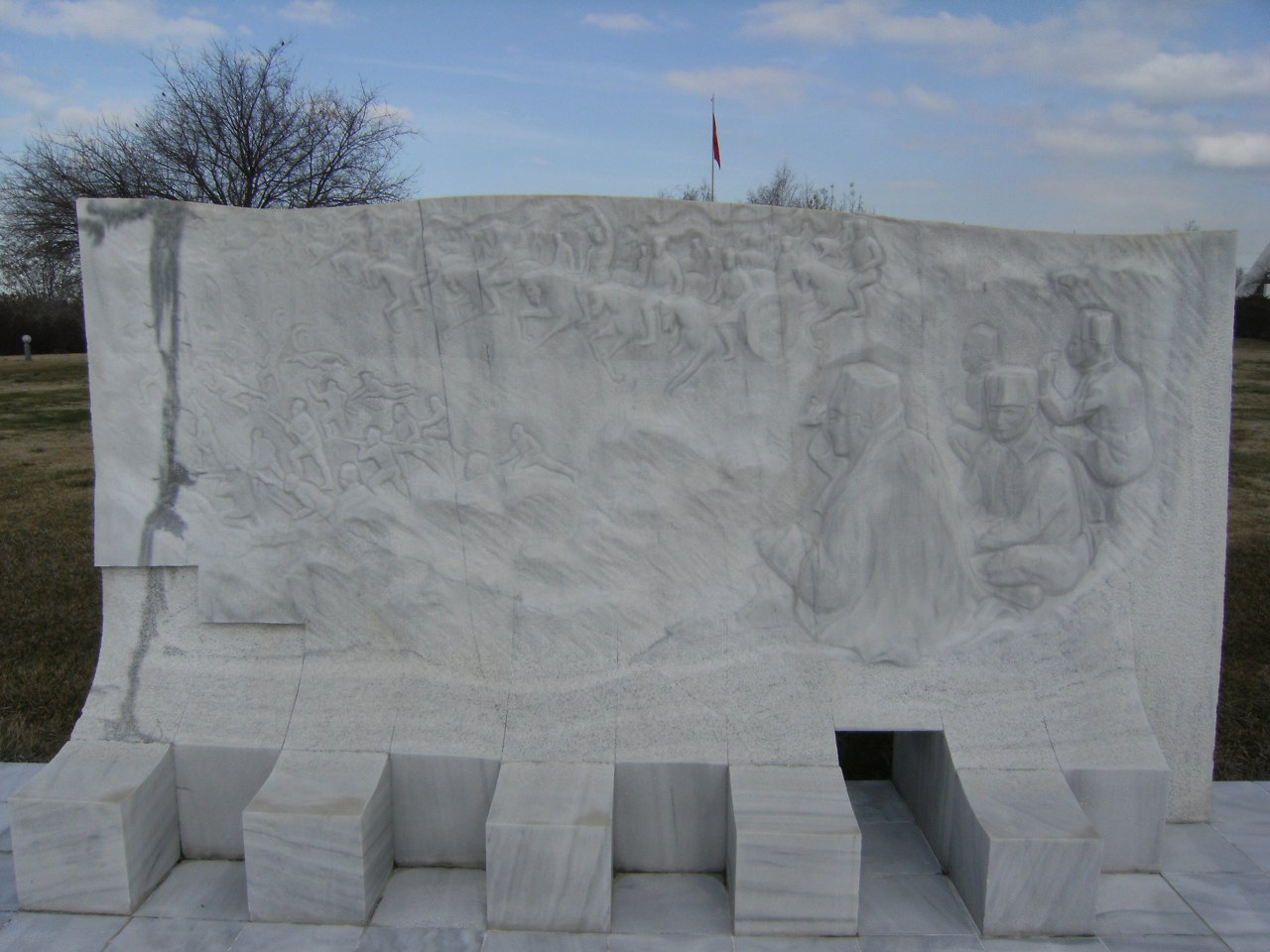
Battles section relief

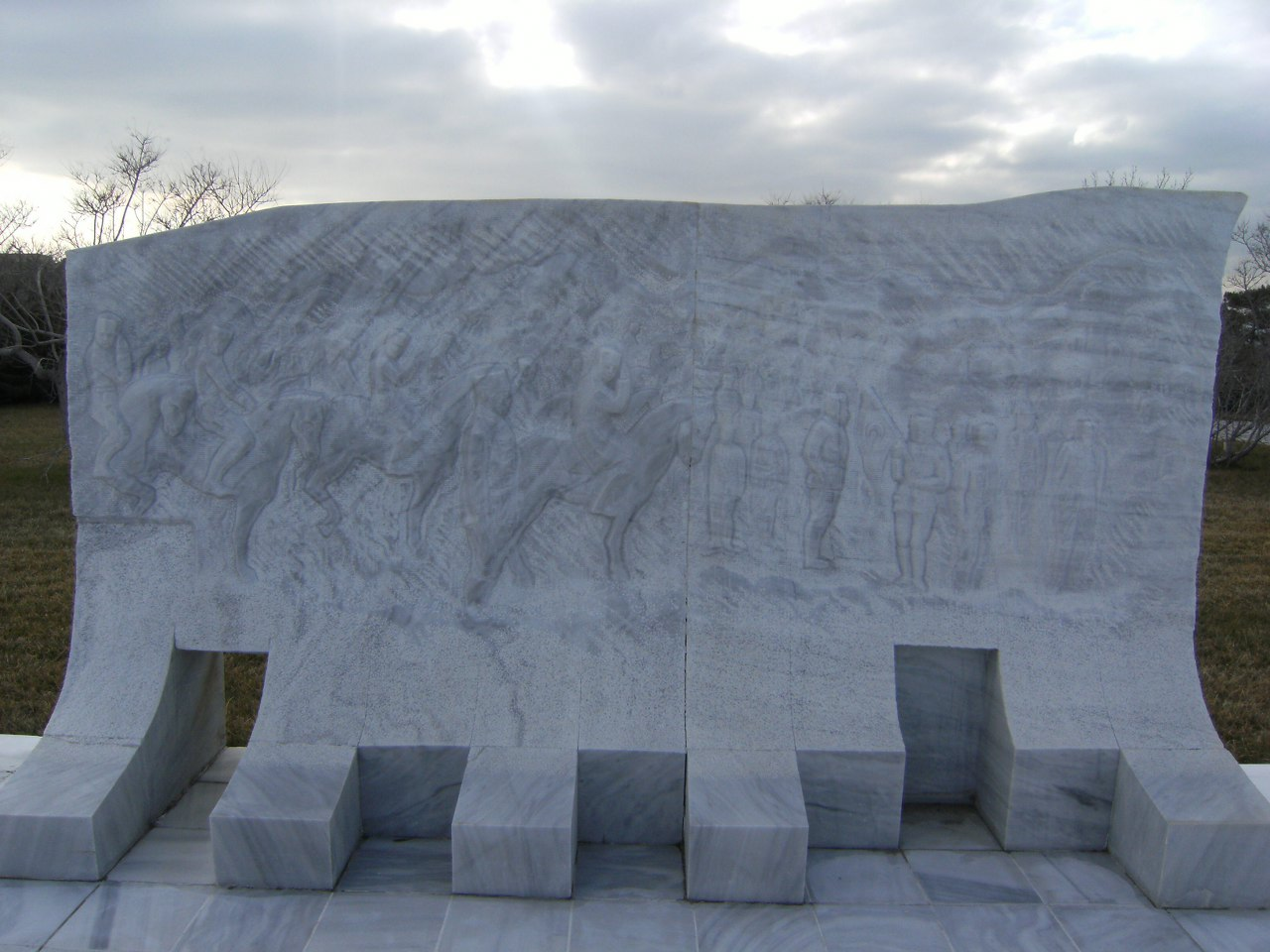
Battles section relief

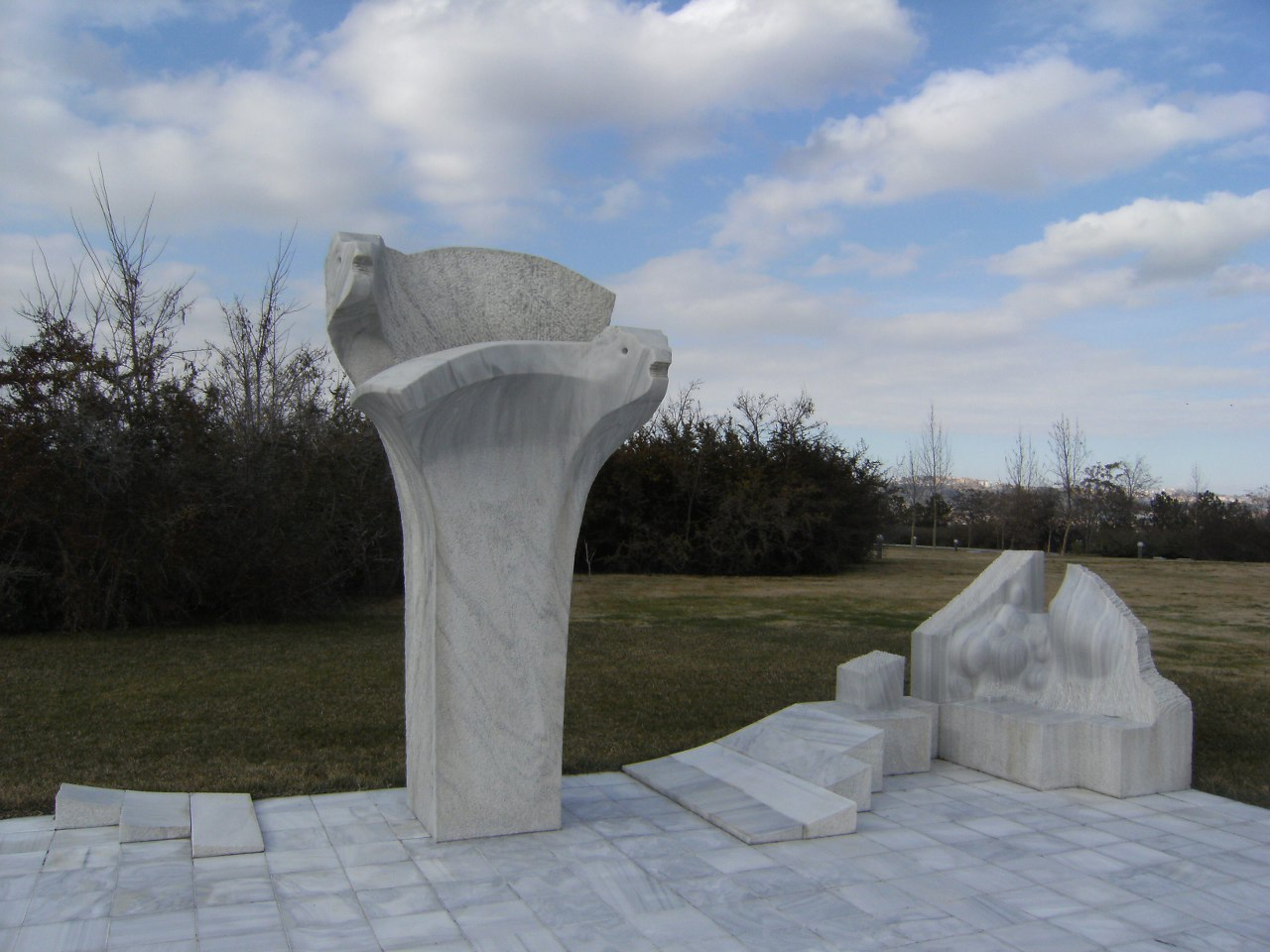
Peace Treaty of Lausanne

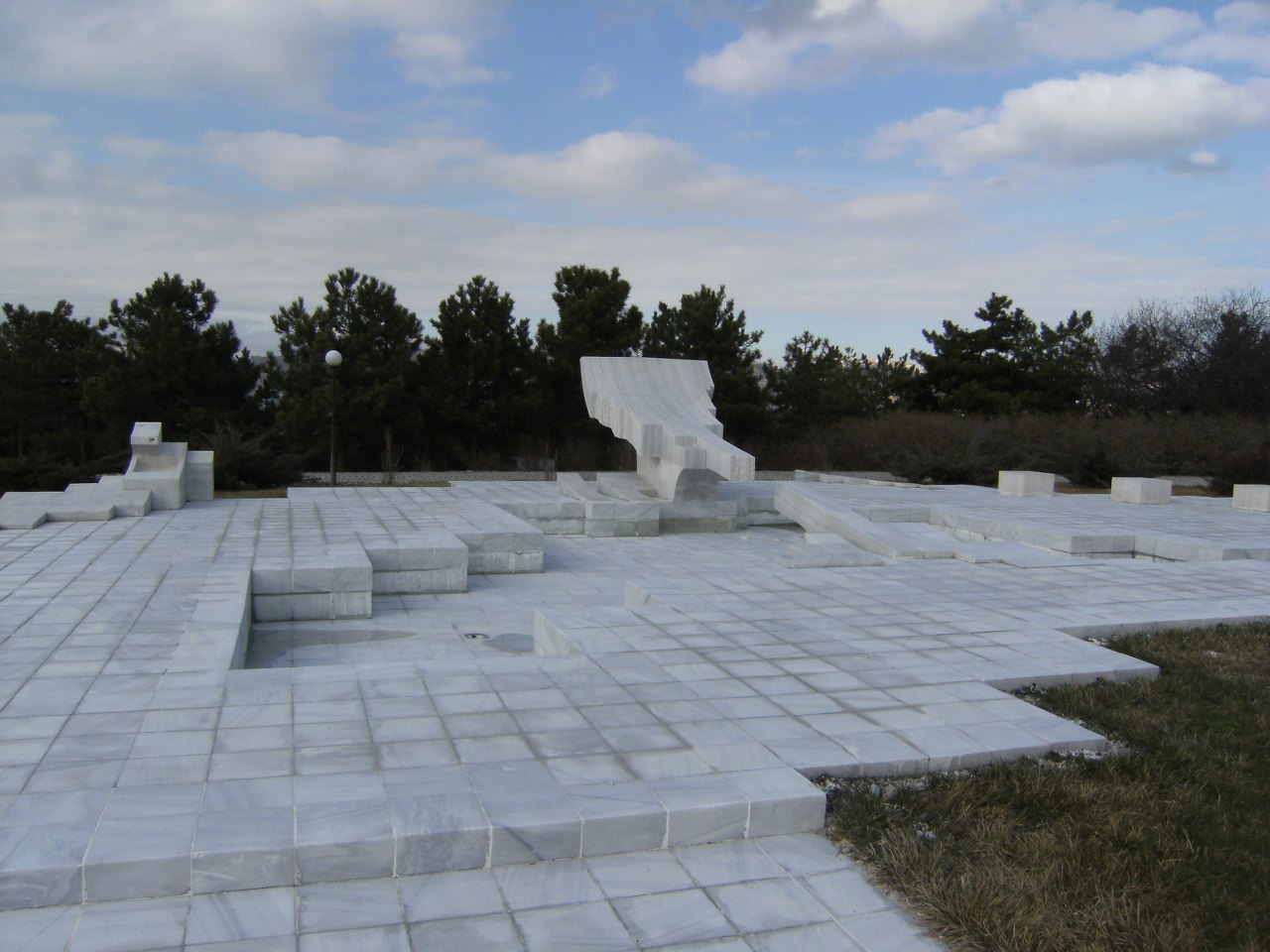
Republic

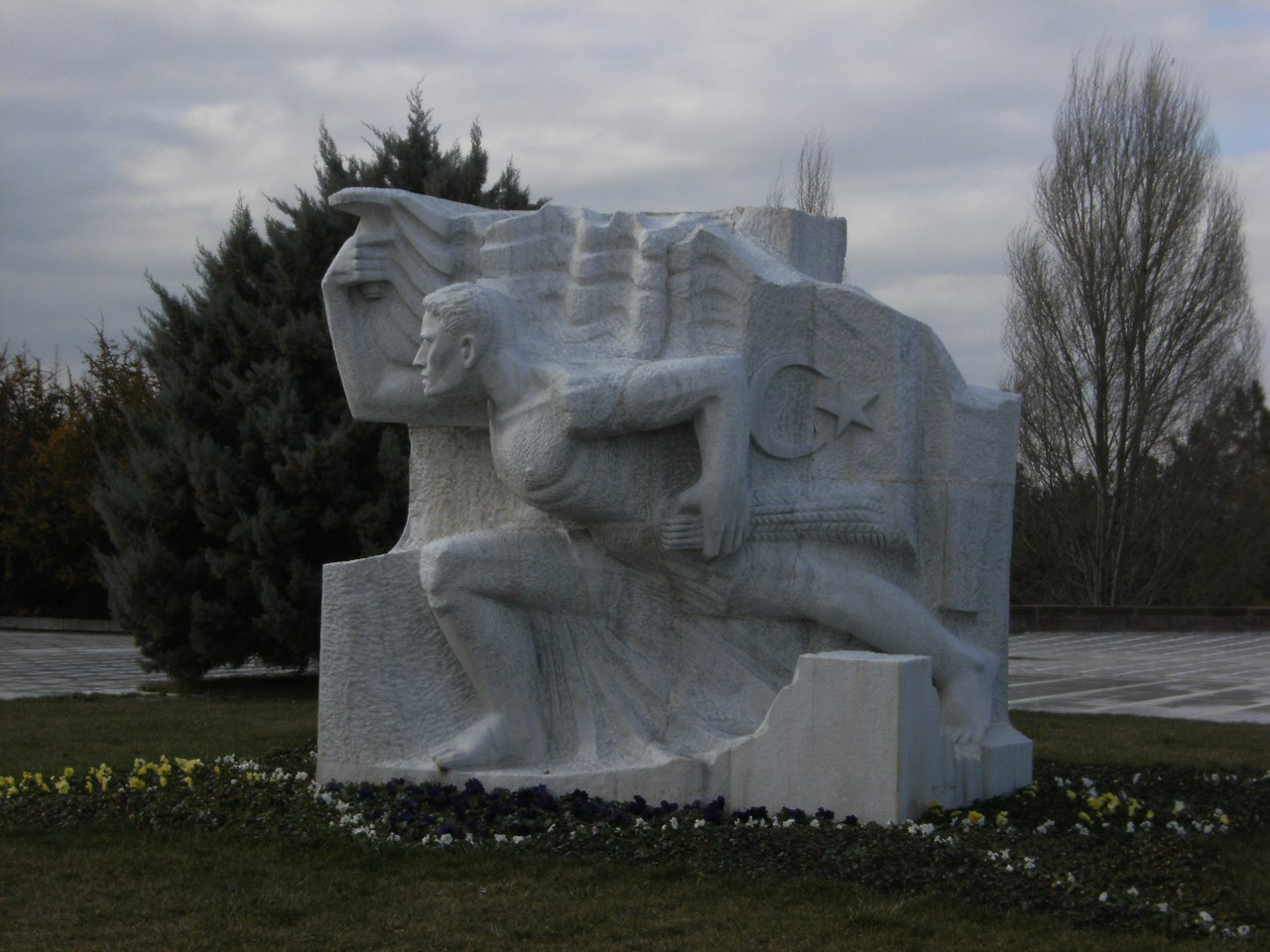

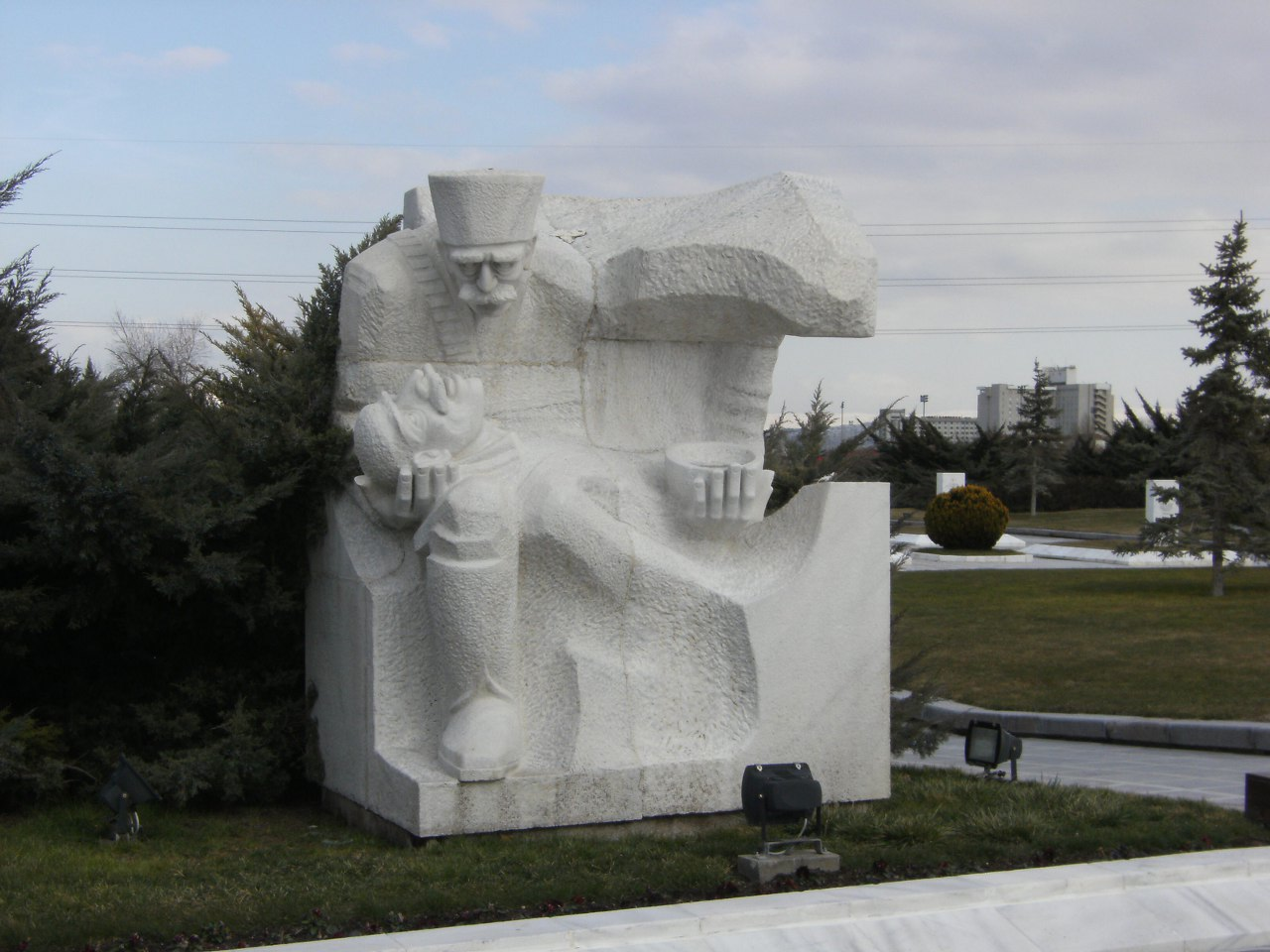

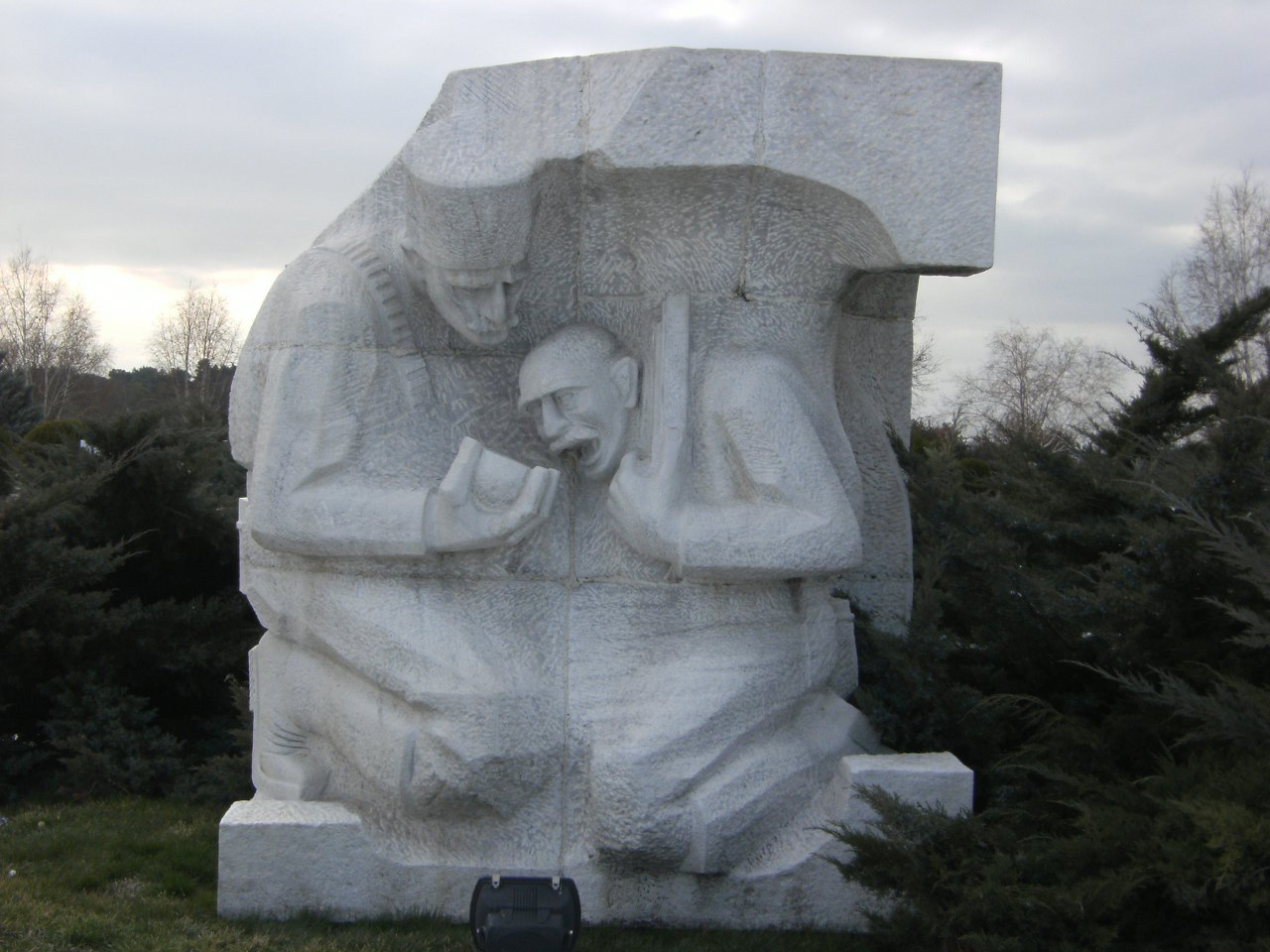

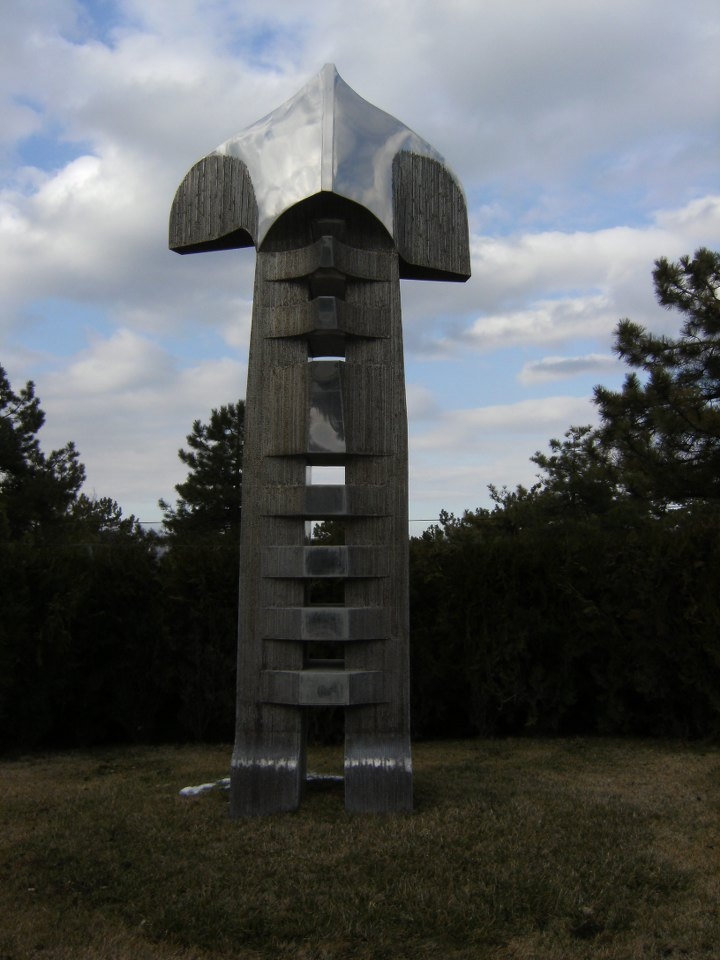
Entrance

== The cemetery ==
A funeral ceremony place borders the graveyard, which is decorated by two sculpture groups on both sides showing scenes from the War of Independence. An octagon structure in the form of a Turkic yurt, called "Simge" (Symbol), is found at the end of the ceremony place, which serves as a shelter against bright light, heat or precipitation. A wall under the "Simge" memorizes the burials with their names carved on it, and looks like an unfinished one. For every new president of Turkey, a stone is added to this "Anısal Duvar" (Memorial Wall) to express the continuity of the republic. A flagpole of 25 meters tall is erected in the graveyard of presidents, symbolizing the development of the republic.

The state cemetery is served by the city bus line 365 from Kızılay, or public bus line 339 from Sıhhiye Bridge.

== The museum ==
Inside the cemetery, a museum exhibits personal belongings, photos and printed media of the burials. It is open weekdays except Monday and Tuesday.

== Burials ==
The personalities, who are entitled to be buried in the state cemetery are, according to law, state presidents and commanders of the War of Independence only. In November 2006, an act of parliament extended the list of persons to prime ministers and speakers of the parliament to enable the burial in the state cemetery of former Prime Minister Bülent Ecevit, who died on November 5, 2006. In January 2020, all parties agreed for burial of Rahşan Ecevit into the state cemetery, making her the first civilian to be buried.

=== Presidents ===
- Cemal Gürsel, 4th president
- Cevdet Sunay, 5th president
- Fahri Korutürk, 6th president
- Kenan Evren, 7th president

=== Prime Ministers ===
- Bülent Ecevit, 16th prime minister
- Yıldırım Akbulut, 20th prime minister

=== Speakers of the Parliament ===
- Ferruh Bozbeyli, 10th speaker
- Sabit Osman Avcı, 12th speaker
- Kemal Güven, 13th speaker
- İsmet Sezgin, 18th speaker

=== Commanders ===
The cemetery has memorials to 61 companions-in-arms of Mustafa Kemal Atatürk from the Turkish War of Independence. These memorials include one mareşal (field marshal), 11 at the rank of birinci ferik (general), 14 at the rank of ferik (lieutenant general), 20 at the rank of mirliva (major general), 14 at the rank of miralay (brigadier) and one kaymakam (colonel). Of the 61 tombs, 11 are empty and are just symbolic monuments.

1. Fevzi Çakmak, müşir 1922 – mareşal (empty, his body lies in Eyüp Cemetery)
2. Ali Fuat Cebesoy, birinci ferik 1926 (empty, his body lies in an atrium of Alifuatpaşa Merkez Camii in Geyve)
3. Cevat Çobanlı, birinci ferik 1926
4. Yakup Şevki Subaşı, birinci ferik 1926
5. Fahrettin Altay, birinci ferik 1926
6. Kâzım Özalp, birinci ferik 1926
7. Kâzım Karabekir, birinci ferik 1927
8. İzzettin Çalışlar, birinci ferik 1930 – orgeneral
9. Kâzım Orbay, orgeneral 1935
10. Abdurrahman Nafiz Gürman, orgeneral 1940
11. Salih Omurtak, orgeneral 1940
12. Mustafa Muğlalı, orgeneral 1942 (empty)
13. Cemil Cahit Toydemir, orgeneral 1942
14. Sabit Noyan, orgeneral 1945
15. Kâzım İnanç, ferik 1924
16. Şükrü Naili Gökberk, ferik 1926
17. Ali Hikmet Ayerdem, ferik 1926
18. Kemalettin Sami Gökçen, ferik 1926
19. Naci Eldeniz, ferik 1927
20. Nihat Anılmış, ferik 1928
21. Mehmet Kâzım Dirik, ferik 1928
22. Nazmi Solok, ferik 1930
23. Ahmet Naci Tınaz, ferik 1930
24. Ahmet Derviş, ferik 1930 (empty)
25. Mehmet Kenan Dalbaşar, ferik 1931
26. Ömer Halis Bıyıktay, ferik 1934 – korgeneral
27. Yusuf İzzet Met, mirliva 1915 (empty)
28. Refet Bele, mirliva 1922 (empty, his body lies in Zincirlikuyu Mezarlığı)
29. Rüştü Sakarya, mirliva 1921
30. Selâhattin Âdil, mirliva 1923
31. Kâzım Sevüktekin, mirliva 1922
32. Osman Nuri Koptagel, mirliva 1922
33. Hüseyin Nurettin Özsu, mirliva 1922
34. Mehmet Sabri Erçetin, mirliva 1922
35. Mürsel Bakû, mirliva 1922
36. Halit Karsıalan, mirliva 1922
37. Âşir Atlı, mirliva 1925
38. Akif Erdemgil, mirliva 1927
39. Sıtkı Üke, mirliva 1927
40. Mehmet Suphi Kula, mirliva 1927 (empty)
41. Cavit Erdel, mirliva 1927
42. Alâattin Koval, mirliva 1927
43. Osman Zati Koral, mirliva 1926
44. Ahmet Zeki Soydemir, mirliva 1927
45. Nazif Kayacık, mirliva 1928
46. Mehmet Hayri Tarhan, mirliva 1929
47. Münip Özsoy, miralay 1921
48. Veysel Özgür, miralay 1921 (empty)
49. Mehmet Arif Örgüç, miralay 1921
50. Şerif Yaçağaz, miralay 1921 (empty)
51. Ethem Servet Boral, miralay 1921 (empty)
52. Ahmet Nuri Öztekin, miralay 1921 (empty)
53. Mehmet Nâzım Bey, şehit miralay 1921
54. Hasan Mümtaz Çeçen, miralay 1921
55. Reşat Çiğiltepe, miralay 1922
56. İbrahim Çolak, miralay 1922
57. Mehmet Hulusi Conk, miralay 1922
58. Halit Akmansü, miralay 1922
59. Mehmet Nuri Conker, miralay 1920
60. Ahmet Fuat Bulca, miralay 1924
61. Mahmut Nedim Hendek, kaymakam 1922

=== Spouses of prime ministers ===
- Rahşan Ecevit

== See also ==
- List of national cemeteries by country
- List of high-ranking commanders of the Turkish War of Independence
