= Fuat Bulca =

Turkish politician

Fuat Bulca 1317-P. 80
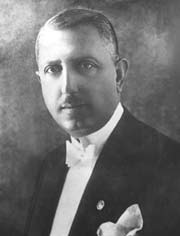
- Born: 1881; Selanik, Ottoman Empire
- Died: 14 September 1962 (aged 80–81); Istanbul, Turkey
- Burial place: Erenköy Sahrâ-yı Cedid Mezarlığı; State Cemetery
- Military career
- Allegiance: Ottoman Empire; Turkey
- Service years: Ottoman Empire: 1902–1918; Turkey: December 8, 1921 – July 4, 1927
- Rank: Brigadier
- Commands: 23rd Regiment; Infantry Brigade of the 1st Division, 1st Division (deputy), 20th Division, 11th Division, Ankara Command
- Conflicts: Italo-Turkish War; Balkan Wars; First World War; War of Independence
- Other work: Member of the GNAT (Rize); Member of the GNAT (Çoruh); Chairman of the Turkish Aeronautical Association

Ahmet Fuat Bulca (1881 – September 14, 1962) was a Turkish officer of the Ottoman Army and the Turkish Army. He served as an Ottoman soldier and he fought in the Italo-Turkish War, the First Balkan War and the First World War. He then joined the forces of Mustafa Kemal in the Turkish War of Independence which occurred in the aftermath of the defeat of the Turkish Empire. He was also a politician of the Turkish Republic. He was one of the closest friends of Mustafa Kemal Atatürk, as well as his classmate at the Monastir Military High School.

He died in a car accident in Istanbul on September 14, 1962.

== See also ==
- List of high-ranking commanders of the Turkish War of Independence
