= Reşat Çiğiltepe =

Turkish military officer, National hero

Reşat Çiğiltepe 1311-P. 80
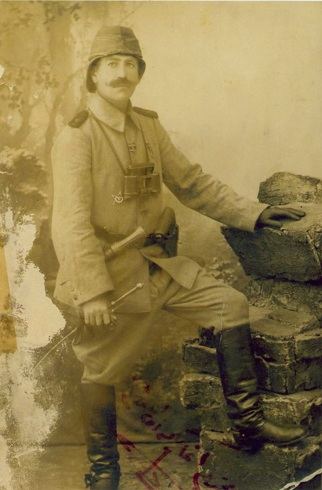
- Born: 1879; Istanbul, Ottoman Empire
- Died: 27 August 1922 (aged 42–43); Sandıklı, Turkey
- Burial place: Sandıklı; State Cemetery
- Military career
- Allegiance: Ottoman Empire; Turkey
- Service years: Ottoman: 1899–1918; Turkey: December 14, 1919 – August 27, 1922
- Rank: Miralay
- Commands: 17th Regiment, 53rd Division; 11th Caucasian Division, 21st Division, 57th Division
- Conflicts: Italo-Turkish War; Balkan Wars; First World War; Turkish War of Independence

Reşat Çiğiltepe (1879; Istanbul - August 27, 1922; Çiğiltepe, Sandıklı) was an officer of the Ottoman Army and the Turkish Army, having fought in the Balkan wars, and in World War 1 during the Gallipoli campaign and the Battle of Muş. He committed suicide on 27 August 1922 during the Battle of Dumlupınar, because he promised the commander of the Turkish forces, Mustafa Kemal Atatürk, that he would capture the strategically-located village of Hacan located on a hill (nowadays known as Çiğiltepe) within 30 minutes. Because his unit failed to achieve that objective, he committed suicide. The village was captured 45 minutes after his death, and he was posthumously awarded the Medal of Independence. He is one of the most honored heroes of the Turkish War of Independence.

== See also ==
- List of high-ranking commanders of the Turkish War of Independence
