= Kâzım Sevüktekin =

Officer of the Ottoman Army and the general of the Turkish Army

Kâzım Sevüktekin 1311-b-P. 5
- Born: 1877; Constantinople (Istanbul), Ottoman Empire
- Died: 1 April 1949 (aged 71–72); Istanbul, Turkey
- Burial place: State Cemetery
- Military career
- Allegiance: Ottoman Empire; Turkey
- Service years: Ottoman: 1895–1921; Turkey: 30 June 1921 – 27 December 1927
- Rank: Mirliva
- Commands: XX Corps (deputy), Customs Guard, Beyoğlu Military Police; Sivrihisar Area Command, 8th Division, 5th Caucasian Division, 8th Division,
- Conflicts: Greco-Turkish War; Italo-Turkish War; Balkan Wars; First World War; Turkish War of Independence
- Other work: Member of the GNAT (Diyâr-i Bekir); Member of the GNAT (Mardin)

Kâzım Sevüktekin (1877 – 1 April 1949) was an officer of the Ottoman Army and the general of the Turkish Army, a politician of the Republic of Turkey.

== Medals and decorations ==
- Medal of the Battle of Greece (Yunan Muharebe Madalyası)
- Gallipoli Star (Ottoman Empire)
- Silver Medal of Liyaqat
- Silver Medal of Imtiyaz
- Gold Medal of Liyaqat
- Medal of the Red Crescent (Hilal-i Ahmer)
- Prussia Iron Cross 1st and 2nd class
- Medal of Independence with Red Ribbon & Citation

== See also ==
- List of high-ranking commanders of the Turkish War of Independence
