= Mehmet Kenan Dalbaşar =

Mehmet Kenan Dalbaşar 1321-Sv. 7
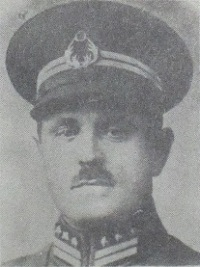
- Born: 1886; Istanbul, Ottoman Empire
- Died: 23 March 1935 (aged 48–49); Istanbul, Turkey
- Burial place: Edirnekapı Şehitliği; State Cemetery
- Military career
- Allegiance: Ottoman Empire; Turkey
- Service years: 1902 – March 23, 1935
- Rank: Lieutenant general
- Commands: Chief of Staff of the Provisional Cavalry Brigade, Chief of Staff of the XIII Corps, 5th Division, XIII Corps (deputy); 41st Division, Commissar of Southern Border, Ankara Area Command, Vice president of the Military College, 1st Division, Chief of the Operations Division of the General Staff, Deputy Chief of the General Staff, 7th Division, VII Corps
- Conflicts: Balkan Wars; World War I Turkish War of Independence

Mehmet Kenan Dalbaşar (1886; Istanbul - March 23, 1935; Istanbul), also known as Kenan Bey, was an officer of the Ottoman Army and the general of the Turkish Army.

He entered the Military Academy in 1900, graduated as a lieutenant in 1902, and then entered the War Academy in 1909. He graduated as a staff captain in 1912 and participated in the First Balkan War that year. He later participated in World War I and was promoted to the rank of major.

He was promoted to the rank of lieutenant colonel before participating in the War of Independence. He commanded the 5th Division under the command of the 2nd Corps under the command of Selahattin Adil. During the Battle of Sakarya, he was assigned to defend Mangaldağı under the command of the 2nd Corps, led by Selahattin Adil. He was forced to abandon Mangaldağı when the Greek assault began on the afternoon of August 23, 1921, and was unable to hold out any longer. Thereupon, he was dismissed from duty by Mustafa Kemal Pasha. On September 29, 1921, he was appointed as the commander of the 41st Division, and on April 25, 1922, as the commander of the Adana Military Region. After the victory of the War of Independence, he was promoted to the rank of colonel on August 31, 1922. He was awarded the Medal of Independence with a red ribbon and a Certificate of Appreciation.

On August 30, 1926, he was promoted to the rank of brigadier general and became Pasha. On January 23, 1926, he was appointed as the chief of the General Staff Operations Department, and then as the deputy chief of the general staff. On December 14, 1929, he was appointed as the commander of the 7th Division. On August 30, 1931, he was promoted to the rank of lieutenant general.

He died on March 23, 1935, while serving as the commander of the 7th Corps. His grave was moved to the State Cemetery in Ankara in 1988.

== See also ==
- List of high-ranking commanders of the Turkish War of Independence
