= Sıtkı Üke =

Turkish military officer and participant of Turkish War of Independence

Sıtkı Üke 1314-İs. 505
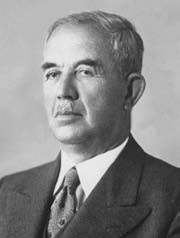
- Sıtkı Bey (Üke)
- Born: 1876; Salonica (Thessaloniki), Ottoman Empire
- Died: 1941 (aged 64–65); Istanbul, Turkey
- Burial place: Zincirlikuyu Mezarlığı; State Cemetery
- Military career
- Allegiance: Ottoman Empire; Turkey
- Service years: Ottoman Empire: 1899–1918; Turkey: January 11, 1921 – May 4, 1935
- Rank: General
- Commands: 76th Regiment, Şile Depot Battalions, 127th Regiment of the 47th Division, 2nd Regiment of the 8th Division, 5th Division (deputy); Infantry Brigade of the 24th Division, Infantry Brigade of the 11th Division, Infantry Brigade of the 8th Division, 9th Division, Cebelibereket Area Command, Adana Area Command, 4th Division, 2nd Division, 8th Division
- Conflicts: Italo-Turkish War; First World War; Turkish War of Independence
- Other work: Member of the GNAT (Tokat)

Sıtkı Üke (1876; Salonica (Thessaloniki) – 1941; Istanbul) was a Turkish career officer and politician. He was a major general of the Ottoman Army and the first head general of the Turkish Army. Sıtkı grew up in the same town as Atatürk, the founder of modern-day Turkey, who referred to Sıtkı as "big brother" and conferred on him the surname Üke, or "honor", during the establishment of the modern Turkish state.

== See also ==
- List of high-ranking commanders of the Turkish War of Independence
