= Miltiadis Kaibalis =

Greek Army officer

Miltiadis Kaibalis (Greek: Μιλτιάδης Καϊμπαλής) was a Greek Army officer who reached the rank of major general.

Kaibalis was born at Makrinitsa in 1869. At the time the area was part of the Ottoman Empire, but it became part of Greece in 1881. He joined the Hellenic Army as a volunteer on 18 September 1888 (O.S.), and after studies in the NCO School, he was commissioned as an infantry second lieutenant on 9 August 1889 (O.S.).

He fought in the Greco-Turkish War of 1897, the Balkan Wars of 1912–13, and at the Strymon River sector of the Macedonian front during World War I. He fought in the Asia Minor Campaign as a regimental commander, before being appointed divisional infantry commander for the 11th Infantry Division, and then commander of the 13th Infantry Division.

In 1924 he was placed in command of the 1st Infantry Division, and of the II Army Corps later.
