= Mehmet Hayri Tarhan =

Mehmet Hayri Tarhan 1317-P. 4
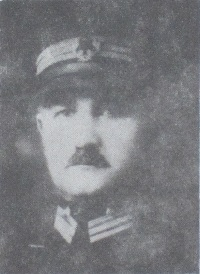
- Born: 1880; Tirnovadjik (Malko Tarnovo), Ottoman Empire
- Died: 11 December 1934 (aged 53–54); Ankara, Turkey
- Burial place: Ankara Şehitliği; State Cemetery
- Military career
- Allegiance: Ottoman Empire; Turkey
- Service years: Ottoman: 1902–1920; Turkey: 21 June 1920–10 November 1934
- Rank: Mirliva
- Commands: Chief of Staff of the XV Corps, Chief of Staff of the XVI Corps, 2nd division of the General headquarters, Chief of Staff of the II Corps, Chief of Staff of the XV Corps, 42nd Division, 12th Division, 26th Division, Chief of Staff of the Seventh Army, Vice General Inspector of the Military Schools; Chief of Staff of Adana Front, Maraş Division, 9th Division, Inspector of Yahşihan Rear Area, Gaziantep Area Command, General Inspector of the Military Schools, Military attaché to Bucharest, Inspector of Logistics
- Conflicts: Balkan Wars; First World War; Turkish War of Independence

Mehmet Hayri Tarhan (1884; Tirnovadjik (Malko Tarnovo) – 11 December 1934; Ankara) was a military officer of the Ottoman Army and a general of the Turkish Army.

== See also ==
- List of high-ranking commanders of the Turkish War of Independence
