= Osman Zati Korol =

Osman Zati Korol 1320-Ağ. Top 1
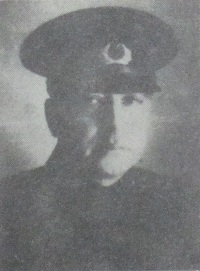
- Born: 1880; Smyrna (İzmir), Ottoman Empire
- Died: 21 September 1946 (aged 65–66); İzmir, Turkey
- Burial place: State Cemetery
- Military career
- Allegiance: Ottoman Empire; Turkey
- Service years: Ottoman: 1904–1920; Turkey: December 11, 1920 – July 27, 1938
- Rank: Mirliva
- Commands: Staff of the Dardanelles Fortified Area Command; Chief of Staff of Ankara Command, Infantry Brigade of the 1st Division, 3rd Cavalry Division (deputy), Infantry Brigade of the 1st Division, 1st Cavalry Division, Deputy Chief of Staff of the Western Front, War Division, 3rd Caucasian Division, General Director of the Military Factories, member of the Military Court of Cassation
- Conflicts: Balkan Wars; First World War; Turkish War of Independence

Osman Zati Korol (1880 – September 21, 1946) was an officer of the Ottoman Army and later a general of the Turkish Army. A native of Smyrna, he participated in the Caucasus campaign against the Russians during World War I. He later led the defence and recapture of İzmir from the Greek Army during the Turkish War of Independence.

== See also ==
- List of high-ranking commanders of the Turkish War of Independence
