= Alâaddin Koval =

Alâaddin Koval 1319-P. 8
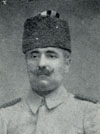
- Born: 1882; Constantinople (Istanbul), Ottoman Empire
- Died: 8 August 1930 (aged 47–48); Istanbul, Turkey
- Burial place: Karacaahmet Mezarlığı; State Cemetery
- Military career
- Allegiance: Ottoman Empire; Turkey
- Service years: Ottoman: 1903–1920; Turkey: February 5, 1920 – August 8, 1930
- Rank: Mirliva
- Commands: Chief of Staff of the 4th Division, Chief of Staff of the II Corps, 55th Division (deputy), 55th Division; Chief of Staff of the El-Cezire Front, 41st Division, Chief of Staff of the First Army, Inspector of Infantry and Machine guns, member of the Military Court No. 2
- Conflicts: Italo-Turkish War; Balkan Wars; First World War; Turkish War of Independence

Alâaddin Koval (1882; Constantinople (Istanbul) - August 8, 1930; Istanbul) was an officer of the Ottoman Army and a general of the Turkish Army.

== See also ==
- List of high-ranking commanders of the Turkish War of Independence
