= Aşir Atlı =

Turkish politician

Aşir Atlı 1319-P. 23
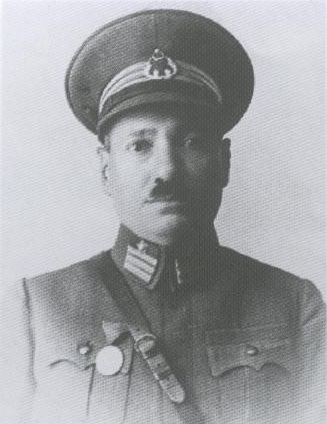
- Born: 1881; Kilis, Ottoman Empire
- Died: October 23, 1957; Istanbul, Turkey
- Burial place: Karacaahmet Mezarlığı; State Cemetery
- Military career
- Allegiance: Ottoman Empire; Turkey
- Service years: Ottoman: 1903–1920; Turkey: February 5, 1920 – August 8, 1930
- Rank: Major general
- Commands: Naval Commissar of the General Staff, Staff of the Iraq Area Command, 1st division of the Sixth Army, 1st Regiment, 2nd Division (deputy), 2nd Division, 23rd Division; Commander of Kuva-yi Milliye in Izmir Eastern Front, Governor of Antalya Province and Area Command, 16th Division, Chief of Staff of the Second Army, Chief of Staff of the Third Army, Vice Undersecretary of the Ministry of National Defense, 23rd Division, IV Corps (deputy), 7th Division
- Conflicts: Italo-Turkish War; Balkan Wars; First World War; Turkish War of Independence
- Other work: Member of the GNAT (Kütahya); Member of the GNAT (Gaziantep)

Aşir Atlı (1881; Kilis – October 23, 1957; Istanbul) was an officer of the Ottoman Army and a general of the Turkish Armed Forces. He was of Circassian origin.

== See also ==
- List of high-ranking commanders of the Turkish War of Independence
