= İbrahim Çolak (officer) =

Turkish politician

İbrahim Çolak 1315-P. 157
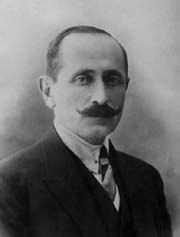
- Born: 1881; Bursa, Ottoman Empire
- Died: 1944 (aged 62–63); Istanbul, Turkey
- Burial place: Zincirlikuyu Mezarlığı; State Cemetery
- Military career
- Allegiance: Ottoman Empire; Turkey
- Service years: Ottoman: January 1901–1920; Turkey: 1920–December 14, 1922
- Rank: Miralay
- Commands: Provisional Köprülü Detachment of the 177th Regiment; 2nd Mobile Forces (2 nci Kuvve-i Sayyare ), 3rd Cavalry Division
- Conflicts: Balkan Wars; First World War; Turkish War of Independence
- Other work: Member of the GNAT (Bursa)

İbrahim Çolak also known as "Çolak" İbrahim Bey ("Maimed Ibrahim") (1881 in Bursa – 1944 in Istanbul) was an officer of the Ottoman Army and the Turkish Army.

== Works ==
- Milli Mücadele Esnasında Kuva-yı Seyyare Kumandanlığıma Ait Hatıratım, Emre Yayınları, İstanbul, 1996.

== Medals and decorations ==
- Order of the Medjidie 4th and 5th class
- Gallipoli Star (Ottoman Empire)
- Medal of Independence with Red Ribbon

== See also ==
- List of high-ranking commanders of the Turkish War of Independence
