= Vasileios Kourousopoulos =

Vasileios Kourousopoulos (Greek: Βασίλειος Κουρουσόπουλος, 1878–1929) was a Greek general.

He was born in Athens in 1878. He studied in the Hellenic Army Academy, and graduated on 7 July 1899 as an infantry second lieutenant.

Quickly distinguishing himself as an able officer, in 1912, with the rank of captain, he was posted to the staff of the prestigious 1st Infantry Division. From this position he fought in the Balkan Wars of 1912–13. After the wars he was promoted to major in the staff of the newly formed II Army Corps.

He fought in the Macedonian front of World War I, and in the Asia Minor Campaign as a regimental and divisional commander.

Promoted to major general and eventually lieutenant general, he served as commander of II Corps and then of III Corps, in which capacity he died of a heart condition in February 1929.
