= Andreas Kallinskis-Roïdis =

Greek Army officer

Andreas Kallinskis-Roïdis (Greek: Ανδρέας Καλλίνσκης-Ροΐδης 1868-1930) was a Greek Army officer.

Andreas Kallinskis-Roïdis was born in Athens in 1868. His father was Efstratios Roïdis, who belonged to one of the oldest Athenian aristocratic families. His mother was the daughter of the Polish philhellene Andrzej Kallinski (hellenized as Andreas Kallinskis), who fought in the Greek War of Independence and became secretary to Kings Otto and George I, and of Eleni Sekeri, the daughter of the merchant and leading Filiki Etaireia member Panagiotis Sekeris.

Kallinskis studied in Germany and spent two years with a cadet corps in Saxony. He entered the Hellenic Army in June 1887 as a cavalry cornet. He participated in the expeditionary force sent to Crete during the Greco-Turkish War of 1897. He served in the Balkan Wars before being removed from the army in 1917 due to ethnic reorganisation.

Kallinskis-Roïdis was reinstated in the army in 1920 and served in the Asia Minor Campaign, where, as a major general, he commanded the 9th Infantry Division and then the Greek army's only cavalry division. He retired with the rank of lieutenant general. He died in 1930 in Athens.

Kallinskis-Roïdis was married to the daughter of General T. Vassos and had three children. His son, Andreas Kallinskis, also became an officer, rising to the rank of major general. He fought in the Sacred Band during World War II and subsequently played a leading role in the establishment of the Mountain Raiding Companies. His daughter Maria married Marshal and Prime Minister Alexandros Papagos.
