= Ahmet Derviş =

Turkish Army and Ottoman Army officer

Ahmet Derviş 1322-P. 26
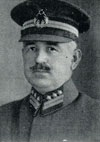
- Born: 1881; Yenidje-Vardar (Giannitsa), Salonica Vilayet, Ottoman Empire
- Died: 17 January 1932 (aged 50–51); Istanbul, Turkey
- Burial place: Zincirlikuyu Mezarlığı; State Cemetery
- Military career
- Allegiance: Ottoman Empire; Turkey
- Service years: Ottoman: 1906–1920; Turkey: February 1920 – January 17, 1932
- Rank: Ferik
- Commands: Chief of Staff of the Hejaz Division, Chief of Staff of the 61st Division; Chief of Staff of the 61st Division, 1st Cavalry Group, 7th Division, 11th Division, General Supply Department, Inspector of Military schools, 11th Division, Istanbul Central Command, Bursa Special Committee, 1st Division, Military attaché to Berlin, I Corps, Undersecretary of the Ministry of National Defense, member of the Military Court of Cassation
- Conflicts: Italo-Turkish War; Balkan Wars; First World War; Turkish War of Independence

Ahmet Derviş also known as Derviş Bey or Derviş Pasha (1881, Yenidje-Vardar (Giannitsa), Salonica Vilayet – January 17, 1932, Istanbul) was an officer of the Ottoman Army and a general of the Turkish Army.

== See also ==
- List of high-ranking commanders of the Turkish War of Independence
