= Nikolaos Kladas =

Greek Army officer

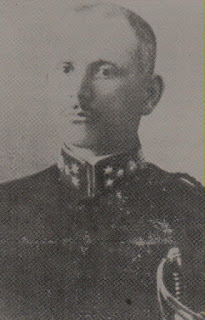
- A portrait of Nikolaos Kladas
- Native name: Νικόλαος Κλαδάς
- Born: c. 1871; Lixouri, Kefalonia, Kingdom of Greece
- Died: c. 1938
- Allegiance: Kingdom of Greece
- Branch: Hellenic Army
- Service years: 1892-1917; 1920-1923
- Rank: Major general
- Commands: 1st Field Artillery Regiment; 11th Infantry Division
- Conflicts: Greco-Turkish War (1897); Balkan Wars; First Balkan War; Battle of Sorovich; Second Balkan War; Greco-Turkish War (1919-1922); Battle of the Sakarya; Greek Retreat (POW)
- Alma mater: Hellenic Army Academy

Nikolaos Kladas (Greek: Νικόλαος Κλαδάς) was a Hellenic Army officer who reached the rank of major general.

He was born at Lixouri in about 1871. After studies in the Hellenic Army Academy, he was commissioned an artillery lieutenant in 1892. He fought in the Greco-Turkish War of 1897 and in the Balkan Wars of 1912–1913, where he distinguished himself by saving his battery during the Battle of Sorovich. Kladas was respected for his professional erudition, and wrote a number of studies on tactics, including the first Greek treatise on the use of the machine gun in the battlefield.

During the mobilization of 1915, as a lieutenant colonel, he chose to command a battalion of the 1st Field Artillery Regiment, before being appointed as deputy commander of the Army Academy. As a royalist, he was dismissed in 1917–1920, but returned after the November 1920 elections, taking over command of the 11th Infantry Division in the Asia Minor Campaign. He led his unit in the region of Nicomedia, and later around Bilecik. During the Greek retreat in August 1922, he was cut off around Prousa by Turkish cavalry, and captured with his division while trying to reach Moudania.

During his captivity at Mocissus, he tried to commit suicide by poison. Quick medical assistance saved his life, and he was released early, on account of his damaged health, in February 1923.
