= Mehmet Sabri Erçetin =

Turkish politician

Mehmet Sabri Erçetin 1311-b-Top. 17
- Born: 1876; Bursa, Ottoman Empire
- Died: 3 May 1956 (aged 79–80); Karacaahmet Mezarlığı; State Cemetery
- Military career
- Allegiance: Ottoman Empire; Turkey
- Service years: Ottoman: 1897-1920; Turkey: February 1, 1920-December 19, 1933
- Rank: Mirliva
- Commands: 3rd Artillery Regiment (deputy), Artillery Command of XX Corps; 41st Artillery Regiment, Konya, Konya Area Command, Left flank of the Uşak Front, Provisional Division of the XII Corps, 8th Division, 4th Division, 14th Division, Çatalca Fortified Area Command, Izmir Fortified Area Command, member of the Istanbul Military Court of the Ministry of National Defense, 9th Division, 3rd Caucasian Division, 61st Division, member of the Military Court for Generals, Erzurum Fortified Area Command, member of the Military Court of Cassation
- Conflicts: Balkan Wars; First World War; Turkish War of Independence

Mehmet Sabri Erçetin (1876 in Bursa – May 3, 1956) was an officer of the Ottoman Army and a general of the Turkish Army.

== See also ==
- List of high-ranking commanders of the Turkish War of Independence
