= Nazmi Solok =

Officer in the Ottoman Empire

Nazmi Solok 1314-P. 44
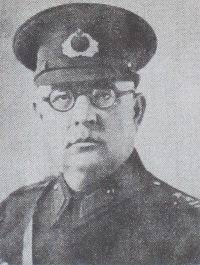
- Born: 1876; Balıkesir, Ottoman Empire
- Died: 1956 (aged 79–80); Istanbul, Turkey
- Burial place: Zincirlikuyu Mezarlığı; State Cemetery
- Military career
- Allegiance: Ottoman Empire; Turkey
- Service years: Ottoman: 1899–1918; Turkey: June 2, 1920 – October 3, 1939
- Rank: General
- Commands: 44th Regiment (deputy), 3rd Regiment, 50th Division, Euphrates Group; 57th Division, 1st Cavalry Division, Menderes Group, 2nd Cavalry Division, 6th Division, I Corps, V Corps, IV Corps, Undersecretary of the Ministry of National Defence
- Conflicts: Balkan Wars; First World War; Turkish War of Independence

Nazmi Solok (1876; Balıkesir – 1956; Istanbul) was an officer of the Ottoman Army and a general of the Turkish Army.

Among his other commands, he commanded the 1st Corps.

== See also ==
- List of high-ranking commanders of the Turkish War of Independence
