= Ömer Halis Bıyıktay =

Ömer Halis Bıyıktay 1321-P. 44
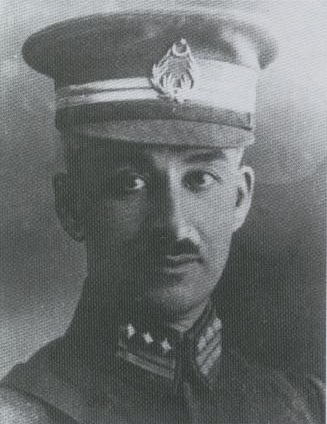
- Born: 1883; Erzincan, Ottoman Empire
- Died: 25 December 1939 (aged 55–56); Istanbul, Turkey
- Burial place: State Cemetery
- Military career
- Allegiance: Ottoman Empire; Turkey
- Service years: Ottoman Empire: 1905–1919; Turkey:1919–December 25, 1939
- Rank: General
- Conflicts: Italo-Turkish War; Balkan Wars; First World War; Turkish War of Independence

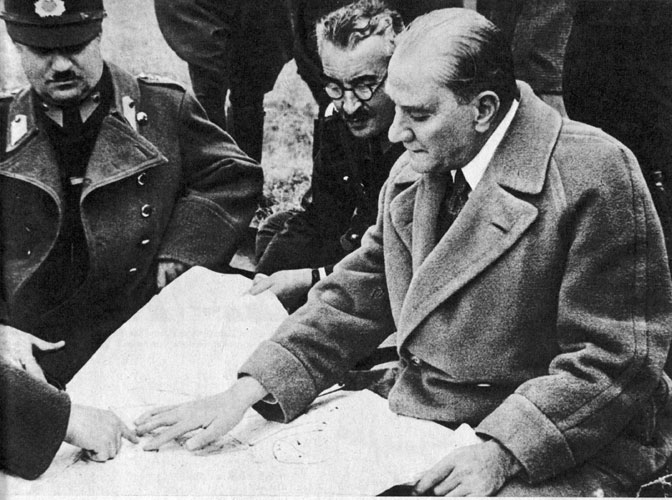
Ali Fuat Erden, Ömer Halis Bıyıktay and Mustafa Kemal Atatürk during the Grand Maneuvers in Thrace, August 1937

Ömer Halis Bıyıktay (1883; Erzincan - December 25, 1939; Istanbul) was an officer of the Ottoman Army and a general of the Turkish Army. During the Turkish War of Independence, he played a major role in the Turkish–Armenian War where he led his forces and captured huge territories from the Armenians.

The 23rd Division was officially reconstituted in 1920 under the command of then-Binbaşı (Major) Ömer Halis Bıyıktay.

His other posts included being on the staff of the Iraq Area Command, Chief of Staff of the 6th Division, Chief of Staff of the 52nd Division, Staff of Euphrates Group, Deputy chief of the 1st division of the Seventh Army, Chief of Staff of the XX Corps, 172nd Regiment - 172nd Infantry Regiment, 23rd Division, Chief of division of Army of the Ministry of National Defence, Vice undersecretary of the Ministry of National Defence, Undersecretary of Ground Forces of the Ministry of National Defence, 3rd Division, Chief of Military Training of the Ministry of National Defence, Istanbul Command.

== See also ==
- List of high-ranking commanders of the Turkish War of Independence
