= Nurettin Özsü =

Hüseyin Nurettin Özsü 1312-P. 256
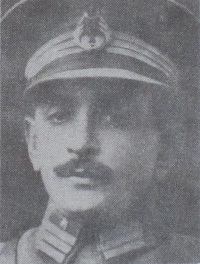
- Born: 1879; Istanbul, Ottoman Empire
- Died: 9 June 1937 (aged 57–58); Ankara, Turkey
- Burial place: State Cemetery
- Military career
- Allegiance: Ottoman Empire; Turkey
- Service years: Ottoman: 1898–1921; Turkey: January 14, 1921 – January 22, 1932
- Rank: Mirliva
- Commands: 17th Regiment, 39th Regiment, 31st Regiment, 3rd Division, Provisional Amman Division; 7th Division, Provisional Division, 17th Division, member of the Military Court for Generals, 41st Division, member of the Military Court of Cassation
- Conflicts: Italo-Turkish War; Balkan Wars; First World War; Turkish War of Independence

Nurettin Özsü also known as Hussein Nureddin Bey or Hussein Nureddin Pasha (1879 in Istanbul – June 9, 1937) was an officer of the Ottoman Army and a general of the Turkish Army. He is known for his defences on the Gallipoli peninsula against the British and French forces in the Gallipoli campaign during the First World War.

== See also ==
- List of high-ranking commanders of the Turkish War of Independence
