= Imtiaz Medal =

Ottoman military decoration

Imtiyaz Medal
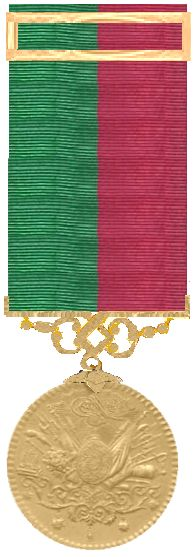
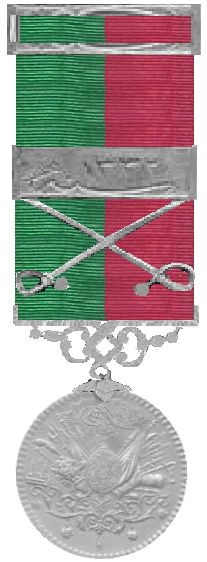
- Gold medal and silver medal with 1333 (1915) clasp
- Presented by: the Ottoman Empire
- Clasps: Crossed swords 1333 for World War I
- Established: 1882
- First award: September 11, 1883

Precedence
- Next (higher): Gold–No higher military decoration Silver–Liyakat Medal (Gold)
- Next (lower): Gold–Liyakat Medal (Gold); Silver–Liyakat Medal (Silver)

The Imtiyaz Medal / Imtiaz Medal (Turkish: İmtiyaz Madalyası) was an Ottoman military decoration, instituted in 1882. It was presented in two classes, gold and silver. The gold medal was the highest Ottoman military decoration for gallantry. When awarded during World War I, the medal was worn with a clasp in the same type of metal as the medal. The clasp depicted crossed sabers, with the date 1333 (1915).
