= Liakat Medal =

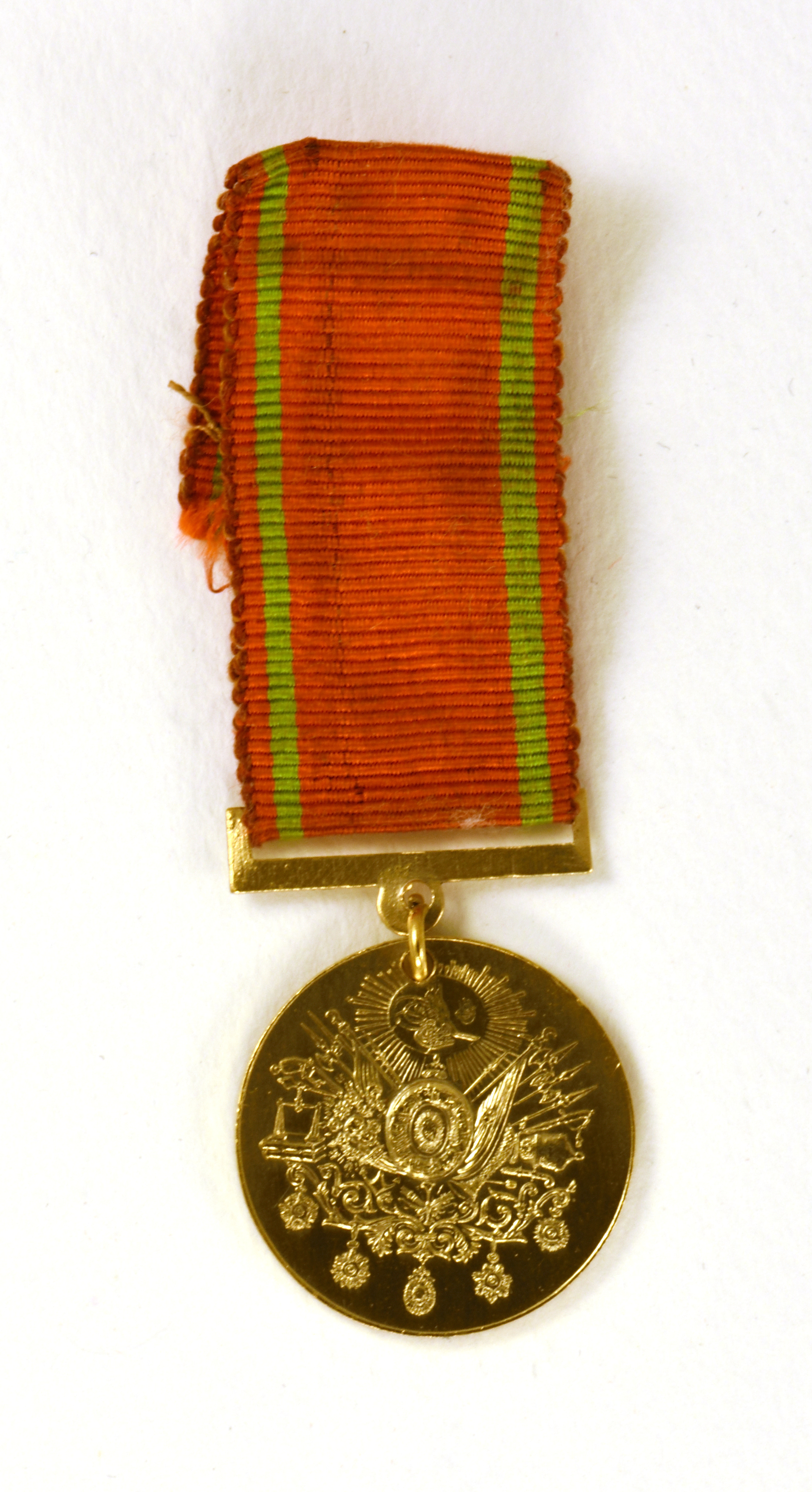
- Type: Medal
- Awarded for: Meritorious military or civilian service.
- Country: Ottoman Empire
- Presented by: Ottoman Sultan
- Eligibility: Civilians and military
- Clasps: Swords for World War I
- Status: No longer awarded
- Established: 1890
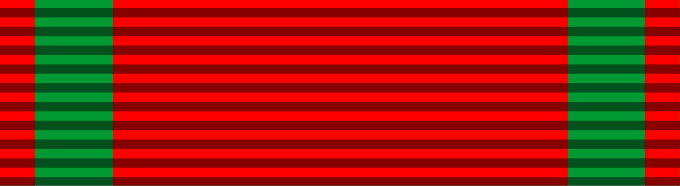
- Ribbon bar of the medal

Precedence
- Next (higher): Imtiyaz Medal
- Next (lower): Gallipoli Star (Ottoman Empire)

The Liakat Medal (Turkish: Liyakat Madalyası) translated as "Medal of Merit," was a decoration of the Ottoman Empire established in 1890. It could be awarded in two classes, gold or silver. The medal was a common military decoration of the late Ottoman Empire, through the end of the First World War. The medal could also be awarded to civilians for general merit to society. In 1905, women were allowed to receive the medal for charitable work, and other civilian merit. The medal measured 25 mm in diameter came in both gold and silver classes. It was suspended from a red ribbon with narrow green side stripes. During World War I a clasp of two crossed swords was attached to the ribbon with the date AH 1333 (1915) inscribed upon them.
