= Miralay =

Ottoman military rank

Miralay or Mîr-i alay (Gendarmerie: Alaybeyi) was a military rank of the Ottoman Army and Navy. The modern Turkish equivalent is Albay, meaning Colonel. Miralay is a compound word composed of Mir (commander) and Alay (regiment).

Miralay was equal to colonel in the Ottoman Army and the pre-1935 Turkish Army. It was junior to the rank Mirliva (Brigadier General) and senior to the rank Kaymakam (Lieutenant Colonel). The collar mark (later shoulder mark) and cap (until 1933) of a Miralay had two stripes and three stars during the early years of the Turkish Republic.

The rank of miralay was abolished on November 26, 1934, in accordance with Article 3 of Law No. 2590 on the Abolition of Nicknames and Titles. With Decree No. 2295, issued on April 9, 1935, the equivalent of the miralay rank was designated as albay.

== See also ==
- Comparative military ranks of World War I
