= Medal of Independence (Turkey) =

Medal of Independence İstiklal Madalyası
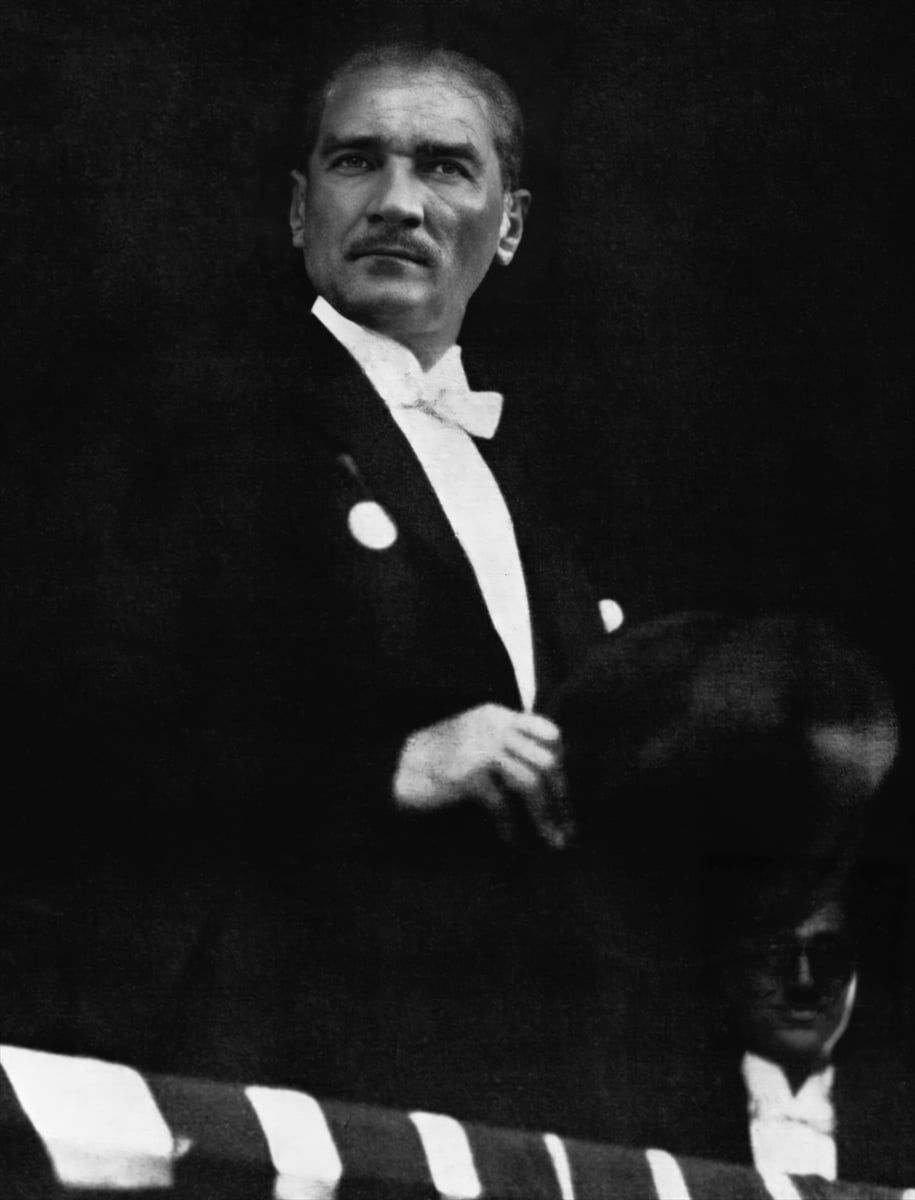
- President of Turkey and Turkish Armed Forces Commander-in-chief Mareşal Mustafa Kemal Atatürk with the Medal of Independence, Ankara, 1925
- Type: Commemorative medal
- Awarded for: Turkish Independence
- Country: Turkey
- Presented by: Grand National Assembly of Turkey
- Established: November 29, 1920
- Ribbon of the medal

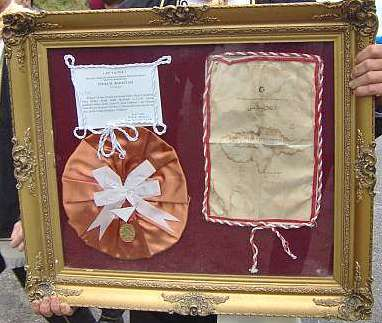
Medal of Independence.

Medal of Independence (Turkish: İstiklal Madalyası) was a special military decoration issued in limited number by Grand National Assembly of Turkey in accordance with the Act 66 of November 29, 1920. It was awarded to military personnel and civilians, who had made important contributions to the country during the Turkish War of Independence. Also upon the flags of all the regiments of the Turkish National Forces, which took part in the campaigns during the occupation of Izmir between May 15, 1919, and September 9, 1922, were bestowed a medal.

== See also ==
- List of recipients of the Medal of Independence with Red-Green Ribbon (Turkey)
- Turkish Armed Forces Medal of Distinguished Service
- Turkish Armed Forces Medal of Honor
- Turkish Armed Forces Medal of Distinguished Courage and Self-Sacrifice
- Turkish National Movement
