= Ottoman Military College =

Military officer education program

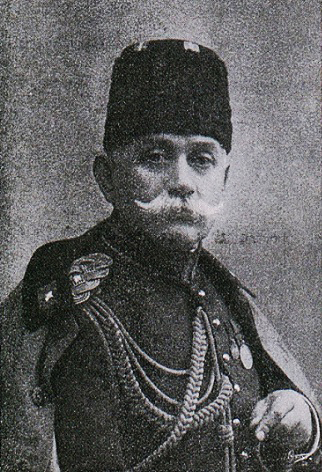
Marshal Ahmet Fevzi Pasha, the co-founder of the Ottoman military academy

The Ottoman Military College or Imperial Military Staff College or Ottoman Army War College (Ottoman Turkish: مكتب اركان حربيه شاهانه, romanized: Mekteb-i Erkân-ı Harbiye-i Şâhâne or Ottoman Turkish: اركان حربیه مكتبی, romanized: Erkân-ı Harbiye Mektebi), was a two-year military staff college of the Ottoman Empire. It was located in İstanbul. Its mission was to educate staff officers for the Ottoman Army and Ottoman General Staff.

== Facilities ==
- In the Ottoman Military Academy in Pangaltı, Şişli (1848–1953)
- Taşkışla, Şişli (1853–1858), today the administrative building of the Istanbul Technical University
- In the Gülhane Military Hospital, Fatih (1858–1862)
- Pangaltı, Şişli (1862 – October 1909)
- The apartment of princes in Yıldız Palace, Beşiktaş (1909–1914), today Yıldız Technical University
- Çağlayan Kiosk, Kağıthane (for three months in 1917)
- Şerif Paşa Konağı, Teşvikiye, Şişli (February 28, 1919 – April 1, 1921)

== Graduates of the Ottoman Military College ==
=== 1st - 36th classes ===
1st class (graduated in July 1849)

- Hussein Avni Pasha, Isparta, 1820, Müşir
- Mahmud Mesud Pasha, Amasya, 1820, Müşir
- Mustafa Sidki Pasha, Soma, ?, Müşir (governor)
- Mustafa Saffet Pasha, Karagümrük, ?, Müşir (governor)
- Sabit Bey, Cyprus, ?, Miralay

2nd class (graduated in 1851)

- Mehmed Pasha, Aksaray, ?, Ferik
- Arif Pasha, Hocapaşa, ?, Müşir
- Rifat Pasha, İstanbul, ?, Mirliva
- Mehmed Rauf Pasha, İstanbul, 1832, Müşir

3rd class (graduated in 1852)

- Ali Saib Pasha, Kayseri, ?, Müşir
- Tahir Pasha, Beşiktaş, ?, Ferik
- Ali Nizami Pasha, Gerede, 1821, Müşir
- Eshref Pasha, Zeyrek, ?, Ferik
- Cafer Pasha (Skadar sancaği, Gosina kazasi)1830, Ferik

4th class (graduated in 1853)

- Suleiman Pasha, Eyüp, ?, Ferik
- Hasan Samih Pasha, Eyüp, ?, Müşir (governor)
- Nuri Pasha, ?, ?, Mirliva

5th class (graduated in 1854)

- Hussein Husnu Pasha, Kasımpaşa, 1829, Müşir
- Mehmed Ali Pasha, Magdeburg, 1829, Müşir (KIA)
- Osman Nuri Pasha, Tokat, 1833, Müşir

6th class (graduated in 1855)

- Tahsin Bey, Galata, ?, Kaymakam
- Ahmed Fazil Pasha, Cerrahpaşa, ?, Ferik (KIA)

7th class (graduated in 1856)

- Mehmed Munib Pasha, Kayseri, ?, Mirliva
- Omer Naili Pasha, İstanbul, 1831, Mirliva
- Hafiz Ismail Hakki Pasha, Bosnia, ?, Mirliva
- Ibrahim Pasha, Sarıgüzel, ?, Mirliva
- Nedjib Pasha, Cihangir, ?, Mirliva (ambassador)

8th class (graduated in 1857)

- Ibrahim Pasha, Süleymaniye, ?, Ferik
- Ibrahim Edhem Pasha, Davutpaşa, 1835, Müşir
- Tahir Pasha, Paramakkapı, 1832, Müşir

9th class (graduated in 1858)

- Ahmed Esad Pasha, Sakız, 1826, Müşir
- Hasan Rushdi Pasha, Edirne, ?, Müşir
- Ahmed Munir Bey, Doğancılar, ?, Kolağası
- Mehmed Riza Pasha, Hocapaşa, ?, Mirliva
- Said Pasha, Bursa, ?, Mirliva
- Mehmed Rashid Bey, Monastır, Miralay (KIA)
- Mehmed Shevki Bey, Monastır, Kolağası
- Kiazim Bey, ?, ?, Miralay

=== 37th - 54th classes ===
46th class (graduated on March 20, 1894)

- Ömer Fevzi, Davutpaşa, ?, ?, Albay
- Cevat, Doğancılar, ?, ?, Albay
- Raşit Galip Dozar, Yanya, ?, Albay
- Mehmet Şerif, Damascus, ?, ?, ?
- Ali Rıza Sedes, Sultanahmet, 1307 P-6, Tuğgeneral
- İ. Cevat Şakir Çobanlı, Sultanahmet, 1870, 1307 P-4, Orgeneral
- Abbas, Tahmasp, ?, ?, ?
- Ziya, Yanya, ?, ?, Albay
- Behzat, İstanbul, ?, ?, Albay

47th class (graduated on March 13, 1895)

- Mehmet Ali, Bosnia, ?, 1308 P-5, Korgeneral
- Mahmut Beliğ, Beylerbeyi, ?, 1308 P-6, Albay
- Neş'et, Küçük Mustafa Paşa, ?, ?, Tuğgeneral
- Nuri, Trabzon, ?, ?, Albay
- Mehmet Zeki, Emirgan, ?, 1308 P-1, Albay
- Hasan Rıza, İstanbul, 1871, ?, Tuğgeneral (KIA)
- Osman Senai, Monastir (now Bitola, North Macedonia), ?, ?, Albay
- Mehmet Rasim, Monastir, ?, ?, Albay
- Ömer Kâni, Süleymaniye, ?, ?, Yarbay
- Mehmet Ali, Iran, ?, ?, ?
- Sabri, Şumnu, ?, ?, Albay
- Hâmit, Iran, ?, ?, ?
- Hasan Sadettin, Balçık, ?, ?, Yarbay
- Osman Nuri, Selimiye, ?, 1309 Top-1, Albay

48th class (graduated on January 28, 1896)

- Mehmet Şükrü, Antep, ?, 1309 Sv-1, Albay
- Paşa Bora, Akyürek, Yozgat, ?, 1309 Sv-1, Albay
- Ethem, Şehzadebaşı, ?, 1309 Sv-1, Albay
- Arif, Çengelköy, ?, 1309 P-5, Albay (governor)
- Feyzullah, Beylerbeyi, ?, 1309 P-4, Albay
- Yusuf Ziya, Damascus, ?, 1309 P-3, Albay
- Mehmet Suphi, Çarşamba, ?, 1310 Top-1, Albay (KIA)
- Cemalettin, Bakırköy, ?, ?, Albay
- Cevdet, Baghdad, ?, 1309 P-7, Albay
- Şükrü, Yenibahçe, ?, ?, Albay
- Ahmed Ahmet Cemal, Çengelköy, 1872, ?, Korgeneral
- İhsan, Mollagürani, ?, 1309 P-6, Tuğgeneral
- Mustafa, Tırnova, ?, ?, Albay
- Mustafa Hilmi, Malatya, ?, 1309 P-8, Albay
- Sermet, Beylerbeyi, ?, 1309 P-9, Tuğgeneral
- Halit, ?, ?, ?, Tuğgeneral
- Ahmet Nuri Diriker, Rusçuk, 1876, 1312-P-23, Brigadier General
- Tahir, ?, ?, ?, Yüzbaşı

49th class (graduated on March 16, 1897)

- Mehmet Vahit, Aksaray, ?, ?, Binbaşı
- Hüseyin Necati, Bursa, ?, 1310 P-9, Albay
- İsmail Hakkı, Filibe, ?, 1310 P-4, Albay
- Ali Şevki, Monastir, ?, ?, Yarbay
- Halil Recai, Monastir, ?, 1310 P-8, Albay
- Tevfik, Erzurum, ?, 1310 P-3, Albay
- Ahmet Refik, İstanbul, ?, ?, Albay
- Hasan Basri, Sivas, ?, 1311 Top-1, Albay
- Mustafa Hamdi, Silistre, ?, ?, Yarbay
- Mustafa Reha, Batum, ?, 1310 Sv-2, Albay
- Süleyman Şakir, Trabzon, ?, 1310 P-5, Albay
- Ali Kemal, İstanbul, ?, 1310 P-7, Tuğgeneral
- İbrahim Ethem, Trabzon, ?, ?, Yüzbaşı

50th class (graduated on January 24, 1898)

- Ferit Cemal Mersinli, Mersin, ?, ?, Tümgeneral
- Salih, Bursa, ?, 1311 P-b-10, Albay
- Mehmet Fehmi, Baghdad, ?, ?, Tümgeneral
- Halil İbrahim Sedes, Sultanahmet, ?, ?, Tümgeneral
- Süreyya İlmen, İstanbul, 1874, ?, Tuğgeneral
- Ali, Bakırköy, ?, 1311 P-b-11, Yarbay
- Zekeriya, Daghestan, ?, ?, Yarbay
- Hafız Rifat, Vidin, ?, ?, Yarbay
- Mehmet, Çarşamba, ?, ?, Binbaşı (KIA)
- Ali Riza, Pazarcık, ?, 1311 P-b-9, Tuğgeneral
- Ahmet Avni, Batum, ?, ?, Albay
- Ragıp, Batum, ?, ?, Yarbay
- Mehmet Nuri, Çarşamba, ?, ?, Yarbay
- Ali, Bosna, ?, ?, 1311 P-b-6, Albay
- Ali Remzi, Erzurum, ?, 1311 P-c-1, Yarbay
- Hafız Ali, Harput, ?, ?, Binbaşı
- Ali Galip, Kayseri, 1871, ?, Albay (governor)

51st class (graduated on December 25, 1898)

- Behçet, Sultanselim, ?, 1311 P-c-2, Albay
- Hilmi, Manisa, ?, ?, Yarbay
- Celâlettin, Aksaray, ?, 1311 P-c-5, Albay
- Vehbi, Servi, ?, 1311 P-c-5, Tuğgeneral
- Bedri, Nişantaşı, ?, 1311 P-c-13, Yarbay
- Halil, Davutpaşa, ?, ?, Yarbay
- Yusuf Rasin, Batum, ?, ?, Yarbay
- Hasan Vasfi, Bosnia, ?, 1311 P-c-11, Albay
- Abdülkerim, Selânik, ?, 1311 P-c-9, Albay
- M. Adil, Köstendil, ?, ?, 1311 P-c-15, Yarbay (KIA)
- Ali Rıza, Köstendil, ?, ?, Kolağası
- Kâzım Kıvılcım, Kemah, ?, 1311 P-c-14, Tümgeneral (governor)
- Mustafa Fevzi Çakmak, Rumelikavağı, ?, 1311 P-c-7, Mareşal
- Ali Sait Akbaytogan, Balıkesir, ?, 1311 P-c-1, Orgeneral
- Saffet, Bursa, ?, ?, Binbaşı
- Hayrettin, Nişantaşı, ?, ?, Yarbay
- Yusuf Ziya, Şehzadebaşı, ?, 1312 Top-1, Yarbay
- Zihni, Çiftesaray, ?, ?, Yarbay

52nd class (graduated on January 17, 1900)

- Nihat Anılmış, Filibe, ?, 1312 P-4, Korgeneral
- Ali Ruşen, Görüce, ?, 1312 P-7, Albay
- Sadık Sabri, Monastir, ?, 1312 P-1, Albay
- Yusuf Izzet, Yozgat, 1312 P-6, Tümgeneral
- Yakup Şevki Subaşı, Mamuretülaziz (now Elazığ), ?, 1312 P-5, Orgeneral
- Ahmet İhsan, Cyprus, ?, 1312 P-8, Albay
- Süleyman Fethi, Üsküdar in İstanbul, ?, 1312 P-10, Albay (KIA)
- İbrahim Habi, Serez, ?, ?, Binbaşı
- Hasan Cemil Çambel, Üsküdar, 1312 P-2, Albay
- Refet, İstanbul, ?, 1312 P-13, Albay
- Ahmet Zeki, İstanbul, ?, ?, Albay
- Muhittin, Damascus, ?, 1312 P-14, Albay
- Mustafa Nimet, Aleppo, ?, 1312 P-18, Albay
- Esat, Beirut, ?, ?, Binbaşı
- Mehmet Vehip Kaçı, Yanya Top.1313-c-1, Korgeneral
- Ahmet Faik, 1313 Top-c-2, Tümgeneral (KIA)

53rd class (graduated on February 2, 1901)

- Ahmet Agâh Perin, ?, ?, ?, Yarbay
- Cemil, Halıcılar, ?, ?, Kolağası
- M. Nuri, Şumnu, ?, ?, Albay
- Refet, Taşkasap, ?, 1313 P-9, Tuğgeneral
- Ali Remzi, Selânik, ?, 1313 P-11, Tuğgeneral
- Rüştü, Sultanselim, ?, ?, Binbaşı
- Şükrü Bey, Şehzadebaşı, ?, 1313 P-14, Albay
- Musa Kâzım Tunç, Afyonkarahisar, ?, 1313 P-18, Albay
- Hüseyin Kadri, Bandırma, ?, ?, Binbaşı
- Mustafa, Köstendil, ?, ?, Tuğgeneral
- Hasan Basri Tosun, Dimetoka, ?, 1313 Sv-1, Albay
- Mustafa Asım, Bosnia, ?, 1313 P-8, Yarbay
- İsmail Hakkı, Priştine, ?, ?, Binbaşı (governor)
- M. Nuri, Erzurum, ?, ?, Yüzbaşı
- Hafız Zühtü Yar, Fındıklı, ?, 1313 Sv-5, Yarbay
- M. Sadeddin, Serez, ?, ?, Binbaşı (KIA)
- Cemal, Erzurum, ?, ?, Binbaşı
- Ali Rıza, Elazığ, ?, 1313 P-2, Yarbay
- İskender Hakkı, Kuşadası, ?, ?, Binbaşı
- Salih Zeki, Kızanlık, ?, ?, Yarbay (KIA)

54th class (graduated on January 9, 1902)

- Behiç Erkin, İstanbul, 1876, ?, Albay (ambassador)
- Mustafa İffet, İstanbul, ?, ?, ?
- Bahaddin, Bursa, ?, 1314 P-4, Albay
- Refik Uran, Kadıköy, ?, 1314 P-5, Yarbay
- Mehmet Selâhattin, Bâbıali, ?, 1314 P-7, Albay
- Hüseyin Selâhattin Köseoğlu, Bâbıali, ?, 1314 P-9, Albay
- Mehmet Sait Kozoğlu, Divrik, ?, 1314–18, Yarbay
- Osman Şevki Eskin, Defterdar, ?, 1314 P-27, Tümgeneral
- Hamdi, Trabzon, ?, ?, Albay
- Ahmet Nizamettin, İstanbul, ?, ?, Binbaşı
- Adem Vasfi, Manastır, ?, 1314 P-22, Albay
- Şükrü Naili Gökberk, Selânik, 1876, 1314 P-13, Korgeneral
- Şefik, Odabaşı, ?, 1314 P-20, Tuğgeneral
- İrfan Durukan, Kasımpaşa, ?, 1314 P-10, Albay
- Ömer Lütfi, Fatih, ?, 1314 P-3, Albay
- Ali Rıza, Kayseri, ?, ?, Yüzbaşı
- Aziz Samih, Tophane, ?, ?, Albay
- Abdurrahman, Mudanya, ?, 1314 P-21, Albay
- Ali Hikmet Ayerdem, Yenişehir, 1877, 1314 P-16, Korgeneral
- Kemalettin, Kassamçeşme, ?, 1314, P-12, Yarbay
- Halit, Kandilli, ?, ?, Yüzbaşı
- Ömer Lütfi, Yenibahçe, 1314 P-2, Albay
- M. Ali, Aksaray, ?, ?, Yarbay
- Mustafa Asım, İzmit, 1314 Sv-1, Yarbay
- M. Ferit, Erzurum, ?, ?, Yarbay (KIA)
- Selim, Damascus, ?, ?, Yarbay
- Mustafa Hamdi, Üsküp, ?, 1315 Ağ.Top-1, Yarbay
- Ali Fıtrî, Sivas, ?, 1315 Top-2, Albay
- Şerif, Köprülü, ?, 1315 Top-1, Yarbay
- Mehmet Tevfik, Kerkük, ?, 1313 P-2, Albay
- Süreyya, Sarıgez, ?, ?, Yarbay

=== 55th - 67th classes ===
55th class (graduated on December 5, 1902)

Staff (kurmay) officers

- Hafız Hakkı, Manastır, ?, 1315 P-2, Tuğgeneral
- Enver, İstanbul, 1881. 1315 P-4, Korgeneral
- Fuat, Harkaişerif, ?, ?, Binbaşı
- Mahmud Kâmil, Aleppo, 1315 P-8, Tümgeneral
- Mehmet Selâhattin Âdil, Koca Mustafa Paşa, 1316 Top-b-2, Tümgeneral
- İsmail Hakkı Erdener, Fındıklı, 1316 Top-1, Tümgeneral
- Fahrettin Altay, ?, İzmir, 1315 P-1, Orgeneral
- Sabit, Antep, ?, ?, Binbaşı
- Ahmet Kemal, Gelibolu, ?, ?, Binbaşı
- M. Nuri, Selânik, ?, ?, Binbaşı
- Emrullah, Trabzon, ?, 1315 P-9, Yarbay
- Kâzım İnanç, ?, ?, 1315 P-29, Tümgeneral (governor)

Distinguished (mümtaz) officers

- Irfan, Manastır, ?, 1315 Sv-1, Binbaşı
- Ahmed Hamdi, Çemişgezek, ?, ?, Yüzbaşı
- Hüsnü, Mustafa Paşa, ?, ?, Yüzbaşı
- Bekir Sami Günsav, Bandırma, ?, 1315 P-17, Albay
- Mehmet Adil, Trabzon, ?, 1315 P-13, Albay
- Ahmet Muhtar, Manisa, ?, 1315 P-20, Yarbay
- Kasım, Edirne, ?, ?, ?
- Vahit, Damascus, ?, ?, Yarbay
- İbrahim Ethem, Damascus, ?, 1315 P-37, Binbaşı
- Hafız İsmail, Safranbolu, ?, ?, Binbaşı
- Asım, Kavak, ?, ?, Binbaşı
- Hilmi, Sarıyer, ?, ?, ?
- Rüştü, Şehzadebaşı, ?, ?, Binbaşı
- Ziya, Edirne, ?, ?, Tuğgeneral
- Cemal, Damascuc, ?, 1315 P-24, Binbaşı
- Şevket, Malatya, ?, ?, Binbaşı
- Veli, Pazarcık, ?, ?, Yarbay
- Emin, Trabzon, 1315 P-21, Yarbay
- Süleyman İlhami, Filibe, ?, 1315 P-14, Albay (KIA)
- Ahmet Nuri Öztekin, Balıkesir, 1876, 1315 P-26, Albay
- Ethem Servet Boral, Caucasus, 1876, 1315 P-16, Albay
- Fethi, Sarıgez, ?, 1315 P-18, Yarbay
- Ahmet Tevfik, Antalya, ?, 1315 P-32, Binbaşı
- Tevfik, Süleymaniye, ?, ?, Binbaşı

56th class (graduated on January 4, 1904)

Staff (kurmay) officers

- Ali Fethi Okyar, Pirlepe, 1880, 1316 P-1, Binbaşı (ambassador)
- Ali Fuat Erden, Taşkasap, 1884, 1316 Top-1, Korgeneral
- Ali Mümtaz, Haseki, ?, 1316 P-3, Yarbay
- Hafiz Cemil, Prizren, ?, 1316 P-4, Yarbay
- Emin Lütfi, Damascus, ?, 1316 P-5, Binbaşı
- Ahmet Muhtar, Çengelköy, 1877, ?, Binbaşı (KIA)
- Şevket, Galata, 1881, 1316 Sv-3, Albay
- Hayri, Konya, ?, ?, Yarbay
- Cafer Tayyar Eğilmez, Priştine, 1877, 1316 Sv-4, Tümgeneral
- İsmail Hakkı, Baghdad, ?, 1316 P-9, Yarbay

Distinguished (mümtaz) officers

- Kara Vasıf, İstanbul, ?, 1316 P-13, Albay
- Necimettin, Kadıköy, ?, ?, Kolağası
- Emin, Söke, ?, ?, Kolağası (KIA)
- Habib, Bolu, ?, ?, Kolağası
- Ahmet Sabih, Baghdad, ?, ?, Yarbay (ambassador)
- Mustafa Asım, Köstendil, 1316 P-51, Binbaşı
- Mustafa Muğlalı, Muğla, ?, 1316 P-21, Orgeneral
- Haydar, İstanbul, ?, 1316 Sv-5, Albay
- M. Zekeriye, Damascus, ?, 1316 P-24, Yarbay
- Hayri, Koca Mustafa Paşa, ?, 1316 P-12, Binbaşı
- Abdülaziz, Kahire, ?, ?, Binbaşı
- Mustafa, Selânik, ?, 1316 P-20, Binbaşı
- Abdülhamit, Baghdad, ?, ?, Binbaşı
- Mehmet Fuat, Diyarbakır, ?, ?, Kolağası
- Mehmet, Edirne, ?, 1316 Sv-6, Yarbay
- Hasan Talât, Çukurçeşme, ?, ?, Binbaşı
- Mürsel Bakû, Erzurum, 1316 Sv-18, Binbaşı
- Ömer Lütfi Argeşo, Şehzadebaşı, 1879, 1316 P-25, Yarbay
- Şemsettin, Damascus, ?, 1316 P-18, Binbaşı
- Behram, Çarşamba, ?, 1316 P-23, Yarbay
- Akif, Hacıkadın, ?, ?, Yarbay
- İzzet, Mollahüsrev, ?, 1316 P-26, Tuğgeneral

57th class (graduated on January 11, 1905)

Staff (kurmay) officers

- Ali İhsan Sâbis, Cihangir, ?, 1317 Top-1, Tümgeneral
- Asım Gündüz, Kütahya, ?, 1316 P-2, Orgenearl
- Ahmet Sedat Doğruer, Üsküdar, 1882, 1317 P-30, Korgeneral
- Ahmet Tevfik, Selânik, ?, ?, Yüzbaşı
- Mustafa Kemal Atatürk, Selânik, 1881, 1317 P-8, Müşir
- Mehmet Hayri Tarhan, Davutpaşa, ?, 1317 P-4, Tümgeneral
- Mustafa İzzet, Çanakkale, ?, ?, Albay
- Ali Seydi, Rumeli Kavağı, ?, 1317 Top-2, Albay
- Ali Fuat Cebesoy, Salacak, 1883, 1317 P-28, Korgeneral (ambassador)
- Süleyman Şevket, Izmir, 1317 İs-1, Yarbay (ambassador)
- Kemal Ohri, Ohri, 1317 P-18, Yarbay
- M. Şevki, Kıztaşı, ?, ?, Binbaşı
- Ahmet Müfit Özdeş, ?, ?, 1317 P-9, Yarbay

Distinguished (mümtaz) officers

- Cemil Uybadın, Süleymaniye, ?, 1317 P-6, Yarbay
- Mehmet Emin, Süleymaniye, ?, 1317 P-23, Binbaşı
- Cavit Erdel, Edirne, ?, 1317 P-14, Tuğgeneral
- Hamit Fahri, Çerkeş, ?, 1317 Sv-4, Yarbay (KIA)
- Halil Kut, Yenimahalle, ?, ?, Tümgeneral
- Mehmet Arif, Adana, ?, 1317 P-17, Albay
- Abdi Pandır, Kasımpaşa, ?, 1317 P-16, Tümgeneral
- Osman Nuri, Manisa, ?, 1317 P-3, Yarbay
- Mustafa Galip Deniz, İnebolu, 1317 P-25, Korgeneral
- Ali Şevket, Üsküp, ?, ?, Kolağası
- İsmail Hakkı, Köprülü, 1317 Top-44, Binbaşı
- Hasan Zeki, Varna, ?, 1317 P-12, Binbaşı
- Süleyman İzzet, Damascus, ?, 1317 Sv-1, Yarbay
- Ahmet Faik Erner, Bursa, ?, ?, Albay (governor)
- Selim, Çerkeş, ?, ?, Yüzbaşı (KIA)
- Mehmet Ali Nasman, Lâleli, ?, 1317 P-29, Binbaşı
- Ali, Trabzon, ?, ?, Yüzbaşı
- Ahmet Zeki, Süleymaniye, ?, 1317 P-27, Yüzbaşı
- Halil Rifat, Trabzon, ?, 1317 P-1, Yarbay
- Hüseyin Hüsnü, Kastamonu, ?, 1317 P-26, Binbaşı
- Ahmet Suat Ener, Saraçhanebaşı, 1317 P-19, Yarbay
- Mehmet Arif, İstanbul, 1317 Sv-5, Binbaşı
- Bekir Lütfi, İstanbul, ?, ?, Yarbay (governor)
- Fuat, Aksaray, ?, ?, Yarbay

58th class (graduated on November 5, 1905)

Staff (kurmay) officers

- Reşit, Cerrahpaşa, ?, 1318 P-4, Albay
- Ali Fehmi, Trablusgarp, ?, 1318 P-1, Binbaşı
- Hüseyin Hüsnü Alpdoğan, Taşköprü, ?, 1310 P-12, Korgeneral (governor)
- Halil Rüştü, Damascus, ?, 1318 P-3, Binbaşı
- Ahmet, Damascus, ?, 1318 P-6, Binbaşı
- Ahmet Sırrı, Aleppo, ?, ?, Kolağası
- Hilmi, Kastamonu, ?, ?, Kolağası
- Kâzım Karabekir, Zeyrek, 1882, 1318 P-1, Korgeneral
- Sadullah Güney, Galata, ?, 1318 Kale Top-1, Albay
- Kadri Demirkaya, Çukurçeşme, ?, 1318 İs-1, Tümgeneral
- Emin Koral, Halıcıoğlu, ?, 1318 Ağ.Top-1, Korgeneral
- Nasuhi, Damascus, 1318 P-7, Albay
- Yahya Hayati, Damascus, 1318 P-2, Albay
- M. Tahir, Elazığ, 1318 P-8, Binbaşı (KIA)
- Yasin Hilmi, Baghdad, 1318 P-18, Tuğgeneral

Distinguished (mümtaz) officers

- Salim Cevat Ayalp, Lâleli, ?, 1318 P-13, Tümgeneral
- Osman Behçet, Balıkesir, ?, 1318 Top-3, Albay
- Ali, Damascus, ?, 1318 P-23, Binbaşı
- Nuri, Toptaşı, ?, 1318 P-27, Yarbay
- Adem Safi, Hamidiye, ?, ?, Yüzbaşı
- Seyfi Düzgören, Firuzağa, ?, 1318 P-14, Tümgeneral
- Mustafa Kâmil, Kerkük, ?, 1318 P-30, Binbaşı
- Süleyman, Isparta, 1318 P-22, Albay
- Mehmet Nuri Conker, Selânik, 1318 P-15, Albay
- Kadri Alkoç, Etyemez, ?, ?, Albay
- Süleyman Askeri, Prizren, ?, ?, Yarbay (KIA)
- Kâzım Özalp, Köprülü, 1880, 1318 P-29, Orgeneral
- Halil, Prizren, 1318 Sv-2, Yarbay
- Mustafa Asım, Bosnia, ?, ?, Binbaşı (KIA)
- Emin, Fatih, ?, ?, Yarbay (KIA)
- Ethem Necdet Karabudak, Aydın, ?, ?, Albay
- Hidayet, Zeyrek, ?, 1312 P-10, Yarbay
- Ahmet Pertev, Seniçe, ?, 1318 Sv-5, Binbaşı
- İbrahim Ethem, Damascus, ?, 1318 P-38, Binbaşı
- Ahmet Hulûsi, Küçük Ayasofya, ?, ?, Yüzbaşı (KIA)
- Mehmet Ali, Serez, ?, ?, Yüzbaşı
- Ahmet Muhtar, Haseki, ?, ?, Albay
- Remzi, Hisar, 1318 P-35, Binbaşı (KIA)
- Mehmet Halit, Zincirlikuyu, ?, ?, Albay
- Ali Suat Ucur, Nişantaşı, ?, 1318 P-36, Binbaşı
- Mehmet Hulûsi Conk, Izmir, ?, 1318 P-24, Albay
- Hasan Tahsin, Damascus, ?, ?, Yüzbaşı
- Enis, Erzincan, ?, ?, Albay
- Fikri, Tarsus, ?, 1318 P-26, Binbaşı

59th class (graduated on September 20, 1907)

Staff (kurmay) officers

- Alâettin Koval, Kasımpaşa, ?, 1319 P-7, Tümgeneral
- Hasan Ruşen, Crete, ?, ?, Kolağası
- Hürrem, Kars, ?, ?, Yarbay
- Ali Hayri Ezer, Beylerbeyi, 1319 P-3, Yarbay
- Rifat Sözüer, Sofular, ?, 1319 P-10, Yarbay
- Hamdi, Karahisar, ?, 1319 P-4, Kolağası
- M. Müştak, Van, ?, ?, Binbaşı (KIA)
- Şakir Nimet, Aleppo, 1319 Sv-2, Yarbay
- Şefik Avni Özüdoğru, Samsun, 1886, 1319 İs-1, Yarbay
- Mustafa İsmet İnönü, İzmir, 1884, 1319 Top-1, Orgeneral ?
- İzzettin Çalışlar, Yanya, ?, Top-2, Orgeneral
- Mehmet Refik, Crete, ?, 1319 Ağ.Top-1, Yarbay
- Vecihi, Kütahya, ?, 1319 P-7, Binbaşı
- Abdurrahman Sami, Yanya, ?, 1319 P-32, Kolağası
- Ali Nuri Okday, İstanbul, 1883, 1318 Sv-1, Binbaşı
- İsmail Hakkı Okday, İstanbul, 1881, 1318 Sv-15, Yarbay

Distinguished (mümtaz) officers

- Murat Nihat, Selânik, ?, ?, Yüzbaşı
- Şakir Güleş, Kırklareli, 1319 P-20, Tümgeneral
- Mustafa Nesimi, Crete, ?, 1319 P-14, Yarbay
- Abdülkadir, Antep, ?, 1319 P-33, Yüzbaşı
- Halit, Homus, ?, 1319 P-15, Binbaşı
- Hüseyin Hüsnü, Gümülcine, ?, 1319 P-22, Tuğgeneral
- Celâl, Arbil, ?, 1319 P-30, Yüzbaşı (KIA)
- Nuri, Urfa, ?, 1319 P-12, Yarbay
- Ali Naki Akman, Rodovişte, ?, ?, Binbaşı
- Süleyman Sırrı, Üsküp, 1319 P-53 ?, Binbaşı
- Ahmet Fuat, Baghdad, ?, 1319 P-53 ?, Binbaşı
- Tevfik, Crete, ?, 1319 P-9, Binbaşı
- Ali Kemal, Debre, ?, 1319 P-9, Binbaşı
- Abdurrahman Nafiz Gürman, Akhisar, 1882, 1319 P-5, Orgeneral
- İsmail Hakkı, Karahisar, ?, 1319 P-6, Albay
- Mehmet Sait, Damascus, ?, 1319 P-35, Yüzbaşı (KIA)
- M. Aşir Atlı, Kilis, ?, 1319 P-23, Tümgeneral
- Muhittin Nuri, Damascus, ?, 1319 P-17, Binbaşı
- Mahmut Refik, Damascus, ?, 1319 P-16, Binbaşı
- Hayri, Yenişehir, ?, 1319 P-45, Albay
- Mehmet Cemil, Damascus, ?, 1319 P-18, Binbaşı
- Celâl, Çeşme, ?, 1319 P-20, Binbaşı
- Mehmet Lütfi, Lazkiye, ?, 1319 P-28, Yarbay
- Mehmet Emin, Aksaray, ?, 1319 P-36, Yarbay
- Lütfi, Yenibahçe, ?, 1319 P-11, Kolağası (KIA)
- Ahmet Ata, Kasımpaşa, ?, 1319 P-34, Binbaşı
- Mahmut Sami, Damascus, ?, 1319 P-21, Binbaşı
- Mehmet Hüsnü, Trablusşam, ?, 1319 P-29, Binbaşı
- Remzi, İzmir, ?, 1319 P-27, Yarbay

60th class (graduated on September 20, 1907)

Staff (kurmay) officers

- Yusuf, Damascus, ?, ?, ?
- M. Kâzım Orbay, İzmir, 1886, 1320 Top-1, Orgeneral
- Ahmet Naci Tınaz, Serfice, ?, 1320 P-3, Korgeneral
- Hüseyin Hüsnü Emir Erkilet, Kadırga, ?, 1320 P-5, Tümgeneral
- Kemal, Bursa, ?, 1320 P-9, Kolağası
- Keramettin Kocaman, Davutpaşa, ?, 1320 Top-2, Korgeneral
- Esat Faik, Debre, 1320 P-15, Yarbay (KIA)
- Osman Zati Koral, İzmir, ?, 1320 Ağ.Top-1, Tümgeneral
- Tahir, Yanya, ?, 1320 P-31, Albay
- Ali Rıza, Kudüs, ?, ?, Binbaşı
- Nevres, Crete, ?, ?, Kolağası

Distinguished (mümtaz) officers

- İbrahim Lütfü Karapınar, Sivas, ?, ?, Tümgeneral
- Ahmet Sabri, Damascus, ?, 1320 P-18, Binbaşı
- Ahmet Fikri, Filibe, ?, 1320 P-4, Yüzbaşı
- Burhanettin Denker, Kırklareli, ?, 1320 P-28, Tümgeneral
- Bekir Sıtkı, Crimea, ?, 1320 P-13, Albay
- Hasan Tahsin, Serez, ?, 1320 P-30, Yarbay
- Rıza, Firuzağa, ?, 1320 P-6, Yarbay
- Hüseyin Hüsnü Kılkış, Kılkış, 1320 P-40, Korgeneral
- Hayrullah Fişek, Kalkandelen, 1320 P-7, Tümgeneral
- Sami, İstanbul, ?, ?, ?
- Yusuf İzzet, Çanakkale, ?, 1320 P-26, Binbaşı
- Alâeddin, Damascus, ?, 1320 P-16, Binbaşı
- Ali Rıza Artunkal, ?, Filibe, 1320 P-34, Korgeneral
- Fuat, Mudanya, ?, ?, Yüzbaşı
- Kemal, Hafızpaşa, ?, 1320 P-25, Albay
- M. Hayrullah, İşkodra, ?, ?, ?
- Mehmet Zihni, Trabzon, ?, ?, ?
- R. Rüştü, Hayzar, ?, 1320 P-24, Yüzbaşı (KIA)
- Mahmut Ruhi, Erzurum, ?, 1320 P-19, Binbaşı
- Naim Cevat, Kırkkilise, 1320 P-31, Binbaşı
- Ahmet Tahir, İstanbul, ?, ?, Binbaşı
- Yasin, Damascus, 1320 P-14, Kolağası

61st class (graduated on August 24, 1908)

Staff (kurmay) officers

- Muhittin, Kasımpaşa, ?, 1321 P-7, Binbaşı
- Ahmet Suphi, Damascus, ?, 1320 P-1, Binbaşı
- Kemalettin Sami, Sinop, 1321 P-2, Korgeneral (ambassador)
- Hüsrev Gerede, Herzegovina, 1321 P-5, Yarbay (ambassador)
- Abdülhamit, Baghdad, ?, ?, Binbaşı
- Ali Rıza, Cerrahpaşa, ?, 1321 P-1, Binbaşı
- Hasan Basri Saran, Şumnu, 1885, 1321 P-8, Korgeneral
- Hayri, Damascus, ?, 1320 P-8, Yüzbaşı (KIA)
- Ahmet Nuri, Sultanahmet, ?, 1321 İs-8, Yarbay
- Ali Galip Türker, Usturmaca, ?, 1321 P-13, Korgeneral
- Hüseyin Remzi, Eskişehir, ?, ?, Yüzbaşı (KIA)
- Mehmet, Damascus, ?, 1321 P-11, Yüzbaşı

Distinguished (mümtaz) officers

- İbrahim Beken, Gemlik, 1883, 1321 P-10, Tümgeneral
- Ahmet Zeki Soydemir, Selânik, 1321 P-15, Tümgeneral
- Ahmet Fatin, Sinop, ?, 1321 P-3, Albay
- Ahmet Naci, İştip, ?, 1321 P-8, Yüzbaşı
- Bekir Fikri, Elazığ, ?, ?, Yüzbaşı
- Tahsin, Yusufpaşa, ?, 1321 P-22, Binbaşı (KIA)
- Sabit Noyan, Çarşamba, 1321 P-30, Orgeneral
- Cemal, İzmir, ?, 1321 P-29, Binbaşı
- Cemal, Manisa, ?, ?, Yarbay
- Hasan, Feriköy, 1321 P-14, Binbaşı
- Cemil, Kartal, ?, ?, Yüzbaşı
- Hasan, Kerkük, ?, 1321 P-28, Albay
- Hüseyin Yahya, Damascus, 1321 P-24, ?
- Hüseyin Hüsnü, Elbasan, 1321 P-25, Yüzbaşı (KIA)
- Hüseyin Hüsnü, Köprülü, 1321 P-38, Albay
- Hüseyin Avni Uler, İstanbul, ?, ?, Tümgeneral
- Hakkı Muhlis Hasa, Edirne, ?, 1321 P-21, Binbaşı
- Sami, Aleppo, ?, ?, Binbaşı
- Şemsettin, Uluborlu, 1323 P-34, Binbaşı
- Arif, Damascus, ?, ?, Binbaşı
- Osman Nuri, Çerkeş, ?, ?, YÜzbaşı
- Ferit, Damascus, ?, 1321 Sv-1, Binbaşı
- Mehmet Hamdi, Trablusgarp, 1321–31, Binbaşı
- Mehmet Ali, Amtalua, ?, ?, ?
- Mehmet Ali, Damascus, 1321 P-27, Yüzbaşı
- Mehmet Fahri, Elazığ, 1321 P-9, Albay
- Mehmet Sabri Ertuğ, Elazığ, 1321 P-12, Tuğgeneral

62nd class (graduated on August 26, 1909)

Staff (kurmay) officers

- Mümtaz Aktay, Sultanahmet, ?, 1322 P-1, Korgeneral
- Taha, Baghdad, 1888, 1322 P-20, Yarbay
- Osman Neceti, Cihangir, ?, ?, Binbaşı
- Sami, Gebze, ?, 1322 P-8, Yüzbaşı (KIA)
- Hasan Rıfat Mataracı, Bosnia, ?, 1322 P-5, Korgeneral
- Rüştü Akın, Filibe, ?, 1322 P-15, Korgeneral
- Şefik, Van, ?, 1322 P-4, Binbaşı
- Abdülmecit Sakmar, Bursa, 1322 P-13, Albay
- Halit Hüseyin Daday, Kastamonu, 1884, 1322 Top-2, Albay

Distinguished (mümtaz) officers

- Yusuf Ziya Kayan, Pleveze, 1883, 1322 P-21, Albay
- Mehmet Ağustos, Ağustos, ?, 1322 P-3, Albay
- Ahmet Derviş, Yenice-i Vardar, ?, 1322 P-26, Korgeneral
- Ahmet Fevzi Akarçay, Tikveş, ?, 1322 P-17, Tümgeneral
- Yusuf Kâmil, Diyarbakır, ?, 1322-12, Albay
- Yusuf Kenan, Monastir, ?, ?, Yüzbaşı (KIA)
- Hasan Adil, İstanbul, ?, 1322 P-23, Binbaşı
- Nazif, Baghdad, ?, 1322 P-22, Yüzbaşı
- Halil Zeki, Kerkük, ?, ?, Yüzbaşı
- Ali Remzi Yiğitgüden, Crete, ?, 1322 Top-1, Tümgeneral
- Mahmut Nedim, Malatya, ?, 1318 P-91, Yarbay
- Veysel Ünüvar, Erzincan, ?, ?, Tümgeneral
- Süleyman Rasim, Aydın, ?, 1322 P-10, Yarbay
- Halil Cevdet Sepicioğlu, Etyemez, 1322 P-6, Albay
- Ahmet Refik, Damascus, 1322 Sv-1, Yüzbaşı (KIA)
- Ömer Basim, Aleppo, 1322 P-16, Yüzbaşı

63rd class (graduated on August 13, 1910)

Staff (kurmay) officers

- Salih Omurtak, Sofular, 1889, 1323 P-1, Orgeneral
- M. Saffet Arıkan, Erzincan, 1887, 1323 P-2, Albay
- Mehmet Şerif, Damascus, 1887, 1323 Sv-2, Binbaşı
- Yusuf, Beşiktaş, ?, 1323 Top-1, ?
- Mehmet Şevki, İspir, 1885, 1323 P-5, Yüzbaşı
- Ismail Hakkı Berkok, Çengelköy, 1885, 1323 P-6, Tuğgeneral
- Mehmet Nazım, Tophane, 1887, 1323 P-3, Yarbay (KIA)
- Hüseyin Hayrettin, İstanbul, 1889, 1323 P-11, Yüzbaşı
- Mahmut Hamdi, Selânik, ?, 1322 P-14, Yüzbaşı (KIA)
- Mehmet Nahit, Kantarcılar, 1888, 1323 P-30, Yüzbaşı (KIA)
- Bahaettin, Manastır, 1883, 1323 P-18, Yüzbaşı

Distinguished (mümtaz) officers

- Mehmet Sabri Beşe, 1885, 1323 P-17, Tümgeneral
- Hamza, Rize, 1886, 1323 P-383, Yüzbaşı (KIA)
- Yusuf Ziya Ekinci, Erzurum, 1886, Top-3, Tümgeneral
- Ali Hamit Doğruer, Üsküdar, 1887, 1323 Sv-1, Tuğgeneral
- Ahmet Tevfik, Dir, 1886, 1323 P-4, Yüzbaşı (KIA)
- Rüştü Akpirim, Babahaydar, 1886, 1323 P-27, Albay
- İzzet, Yanya, 1884, 1323 P-8, Yüzbaşı (KIA)
- Şevket, Tırnova, 1885, 1323 P-15, ?
- Mustafa, Damascus, 1885, 1323 Sv-33, Yüzbaşı (KIA)
- Tahir, Yeşiltulumba, 1886, 1323 P-27, Binbaşı (KIA)
- Mehmet Selim, Damascus, 1890, 1323 Top-25, Binbaşı
- İbrahim, Crete, 1884, 1323 P-19, Albay
- Hüseyin, Beşiktaş, 1885, 1323 P-16, Yüzbaşı (KIA)
- Mehmet Selâhattin, Aleppo, 1890, 1323 P-23, Albay
- Hüseyin, Küçükpazar, 1885, 1323 P-12, Yüzbaşı
- Nurettin, Aksaray, 1887, 1323 P-22, Yüzbaşı (KIA)
- Tahir, Keşan, 1884, 1323 P-28, Yüzbaşı
- Ali Rıza, Trabzon, 1884, 1323 Sv-6, Yarbay
- Tacettin, Hanya, 1885, 1323 P-28, Yüzbaşı (KIA)
- Adil Türer, İzmir, 1886, 1322 Kale Top-2
- Cemil, Trablus, ?, 1323 P-33, Yüzbaşı (KIA)
- Selim Şerif, Damascus, 1884, ?, ?

64th class (graduated on July 28, 1912)

Staff (kurmay) officers

- Refet Bele, Selânik, 1881, 1314 P-19, Mirliva
- Mustafa Edip, Adapazarı, 1881, 1314 P-29, Miralay
- Mehmet Kenan Dalbaşar, Yani Kaldırım, 1885, 1318 Sv-7, Korgeneral
- Mesut, Çankırı, 1882, 1320 P-1, Yüzbaşı (KIA)
- Mehmet Nihat, Bursa, 1885, 1321 P-6, Yarbay
- Ahmet Vefik, Van, 1882, 1318 Sv-13, Yüzbaşı (KIA)
- Sait, Selânik, 1880, 1320 P-32, Binbaşı
- İsmail Hakkı Tümerdem, Eyüp, 1881, 1320 P-64, Albay
- Kemal, Çemberlitaş, 1888, 1323 İs-5, Yüzbaşı (KIA)
- M. Kâzım Dirik, Manastır, 1879, 1315 P-5, Mirliva (governor)
- Tevfik, Aleppo, 1883, 1319 P-52, Binbaşı
- Ahmet Nihat, İstanbul, 1882, 1317 P-37, Albay

Distinguished (mümtaz) officers

- Mehmet İhsan Hün, Yenice-i Vardar, 1321 P-50, Albay
- Cemal, Aksaray, 1880, 1317 P-90, Binbaşı (KIA)
- Sait, İstanbul, 1880, 1314 P-64, Binbaşı (governor)
- Kenan, İzmit, 1879, 1317 P-177, Albay
- Hasan Tahsin, Ankara, 1879, 1318 P-61, Binbaşı (KIA)
- Yusuf Kemal, Erzurum, 1883, 1318 P-144, Binbaşı
- Hikmet, Şehremini, 1881, 1318 Sv-8, Binbaşı
- Saffet, Davutpaşa, 1880, 1318 Sv-6, Yarbay

65th class (graduated on July 28, 1914)

Staff (kurmay) officers

- M. Tevfik Bıyıkoğlu, Çanakkale, 1889, 1324 Top-2, Albay
- M. Celâlettin Germeyanoğlu, Nişantaş, 1889, 1324 P-319, Binbaşı
- Hüseyin Rahmi Apak, Babaeski, 1887, 1323 P-28, Albay
- Muzaffer Ergüder, Bursa, 1886, 1319 P-37, Orgeneral
- Cevdet, Edirne, 1885, 1324 P-5, Yüzbaşı (KIA)
- Ahmet Temiz, Şumnu, 1887, 1324 Top-1, Yüzbaşı
- Bekir Sıtkı, Baghdad, 1890, ?, ?
- Osman Yümnü, İstanbul, 1888, 1320 Sv-2, Binbaşı
- Yusuf Ziya Yazgan, Cisri Mustafa Paşa, 1888, 1324 P-16, Tümgeneral
- Mahmut Nedim, Caucasus, 1880, 1316 Sv-484, Yarbay (KIA)
- Ali Enver, Florina, 1887, 1324 P-78, Binbaşı (KIA)
- Yakup, Erzincan, 1885, ?, Yüzbaşı (KIA)
- Reşat, İstanbul, 1883, 1317 P-73, Albay
- Şemsettin Erkuş, Rumkale, 1889, 1324 P-7, Albay
- Mehmet Neşet, Manastır, 1888, 1324 Sv-32, Albay
- Mehmet Tarık, Sudan, 1887, 1324 Sv-1, Yüzbaşı
- Mehmet Faik Sütünne, Sultanselim, 1884, 1320 P-60, Tümgeneral
- Ahmet Nüzhet, Kilis, 1888, 1324 P-8, Binbaşı

Distinguished (mümtaz) officers

- Muzaffer Şakir, Tophane, 1889, 1324 P-80, Yüzbaşı
- Mehmet Nuri, Harput, 1881, 1318 P-58, Binbaşı (KIA)
- M. Mazlumi İskora, Kalkandelen, 1324 P-53, Orgeneral
- Ömer, Şumnu, 1881, 1320 P-61, Binbaşı
- Muhittin, Damascus, 1887, 1322 P-35, Yüzbaşı
- Ömer Halis Bıyıktay, Erzincan, 1884, 1321 P-44, Korgeneral
- Mustafa, Damascus, 1888, 1321 P-78, Yüzbaşı

66th class (graduated on October 4, 1919)

- M. Recep Peker, İstanbul, 1889, 1323 P-44, Yarbay
- Bâki Vandemir, Sultanahmet, 1889, 1324 Sv-3, Orgeneral
- Ali Germeyanoğlu, İstanbul, 1889, 1324 P-320, Yüzbaşı
- Mustafa Şevki, Kalkandelen, 1889, 1324 P-20, Yarbay
- Mehmet Ziya, Sivas, 1888, 1324 P-8, Binbaşı
- Seyfettin Akkoç, Bitlis, 1320 P-122, Tümgeneral
- Hasan Tahsin, Konya, 1884, 1322 P-44, Yarbay
- Ali Rıza Erem, Beşiktaş, 1887, 1324 P-1, Yarbay
- İshak Avni Akdağ, Harput, 1889, 1324 P-11, Orgeneral
- M. Ferit, Şam, 1889, 1324 P-54, Yüzbaşı
- M. Kadri Musluoğlu, Aksaray, 1889, 1324 P-9, Yüzbaşı
- Talât, Sultanahmet, 1888, 1324 P-1, Binbaşı
- Yakup Sami, Kayseri, 1887, 1324 P-11, Yüzbaşı (KIA)
- Faik Sözer, Selânik, 1885, 1324 P-2, Yarbay
- Ali Rıza, Aksaray, 1884, 1321 P-91, Albay
- Hasan İskender, Manastır, 1885, 1324 Sv-22, Binbaşı
- Faik, Serez, 1881, 1319 P-46, Binbaşı

67th class (graduated on July 6, 1920)

- Tahsin Alagöz, Isprata, 1884, 1321 P-26, Yarbay
- Mustafa Cemil Taner, Uzunköprü, 1892, 1325 P-42, Tümgeneral
- Mehmet Salih Erkuş, Rumkale, 1886, 1324 Sv-6, Tümgeneral
- Şemsettin Taner, Uzunköprü, 1890, 1325 Sv-2, Korgeneral
- Necmettin, Edirne, 1890, 1325 Sv-16, Üsteğmen
- Mehmet Nuri Yamut, Selânik, 1890, 1324 P-27, Orgeneral
- Ahmet Mithat, Sarıgez, 1888, 1325 P-11, Binbaşı
- İsmail Hakkı Kurtcebe Noyan, Sivas, 1888, 1325 P-6, Orgeneral
- Mustafa Kemal Gökçe, Erzincan, 1889, 1325 P-354, Tümgeneral
- Mehmet Şükrü Ögel, Sarıgez, 1888, 1325 P-28, Albay
- Mehmet Şükrü Koçak, Elazığ, 1885, 1321 Sv-3, Yarbay
- Mehmet Kemalettin, Çengelköy, 1885, 1323 J-31, Albay
- Halil, Manastır, 1889, 1325 P-12, Yüzbaşı
- İ. Kemal Baybora, Bayburt, 1890, 1325 Sv-4, Yarbay
- Recep Ferdi Süalp, Edirne, 1887, 1324 P-10, Tümgeneral
- Ali Haydar, Elazığ, 1888, 1324 P-66, Binbaşı (KIA)
- Cevat Karsan, Fethiye, 1885, 1321 P-169, Albay
- Hayri, Büyükdere, 1887, 1325 P-185, Yüzbaşı
- Nebil, İstanbul, 1887, ?, Yüzbaşı
- İsmail Ekrem Baydar, İstanbul, 1886, 1321 Top-3, Korgeneral

== Education ==
- Education in the Ottoman Empire
