= Özüdoğru =

Özüdoğru is a Turkish surname formed by the combination of the two Turkish words öz ("gist; kernel") and doğru ("true; right") and may refer to:

- Abdurrahim Özüdoğru (1952–2001), Turkish German machinist and murder victim
- Şefik Avni Özüdoğru (1884–1960), officer of the Ottoman Army and of the Turkish Army
- Talat Avni Özüdoğru (1880–1939), military officer of the Ottoman Army
