= List of high-ranking commanders of the Turkish War of Independence =

This list includes high-ranking commanders who took part in the Turkish War of Independence:

Name	Birth	Death	Cemetery	Military Academy	Staff College	Maj.	Lt. Col.	Col.	Mirliva	Ferik	I. Ferik	Müşir	World War I	War of Independence
Muhittin Akyüz	1870, Istanbul	Oct. 13, 1940	Ankara Hava Şehitliği	1304-P.38	–	1898	1902	1913	1916				Asir Division, Hejaz Corps	Kastamonu Area Command, Adana Area Command
Nazif Kayacık	1872, Istanbul	Mar 20, 1951, Istanbul	Feriköy Mezarlığı; State Cemetery	1306-P.29	–	1905	1910	1915	1928				Provisional Regiment of the 9th Division, 5th Regiment, Saros Group, 6th Division, General Inspector of the Depot units	3rd Caucasian Division, Chief of Konya Military Courts, Inspector of the Depot units
Cevat Çobanlı	1871, Sultanahmet, Istanbul	Mar 13, 1938	Erenköy Mezarlığı; State Cemetery	1307-P.4	46th class	1895	1898	1910	1914	1918	1926		Dardanelles Fortified Area Command, XIV Corps, XV Corps, XIV Corps, VIII Corps, Second Army (deputy), Eighth Army, War Minister, Chief of the General Staff	El-Cezire Front
Cemil Conk	1873, Istanbul	1963		1308-P.18	Germany	1901	1914	1916	1923				36th Regiment, 4th Division, 54th Division, 41st Division	11th Division, 18th Division
Naci Eldeniz	1875, Bitola	Mar 1948	Ankara Asrî Mezarlığı; State Cemetery	1309-P.17	Germany	1902	1914	1917	1922	1927			Chief aide-de-camp of Mehmed VI	7th Division
Rüştü	1872, Erzurum	Jul 13, 1926, İzmir		1309-Top.8		1911	1914	1917	1920				9th Caucasian Division	3rd Caucasian Division, 9th Caucasian Division
Nureddin	1873, Bursa	Feb 18, 1932, Istanbul	Beylerbeyi Küplüce Mezarlığı	1309-P.31	–	1901	1911	1914	1918	1922			4th Division, Iraq Area Command, IX Corps, Muğla and Antalya Area Command, XXI Corps, XVII Corps, XXV Corps, Aydın Area Command	Central Army, First Army
Mümtaz Çeçen	1876, Istanbul	1941	State Cemetery	1309-P.99	–	1911	1916	1921					111th Regiment, Samsun Training Regiment	11th Division, 57th Division
Kâzım Sevüktekin	1877, Istanbul	1949	State Cemetery	1311-b-P.5	–	1906	1914	1918	1922				XX Corps (deputy), Customs Guard, Beyoğlu Military Police	Sivrihisar Area Command, 8th Division
Osman Nuri Koptagel	1874, Erzincan	Nov 1942, Ankara	State Cemetery	1311-b-P.17	–	1912	1915	1920	1922				Muş Training Center, 43rd Division, 27th Division, 43rd Division	12th Division
Münip Özsoy	1878, Istanbul	Jul 29, 1950, Istanbul	State Cemetery	1311-b-P.32	–	1911	1915	1921					36th Regiment, 178th Regiment, 140th Regiment, Chief of the Supply of the Fourth Army	Infantry Brigade of the 24th Division, 61st Division, Polatlı Area
Süleyman Sabri	1873, Bitola	1941		1311-b-Sv.50	–	1912	1915	1921	1929				Nasiriyah, Baghdad, Iraq Cavalry Brigade, Iraq General Tribal Forces, Musul, 8th Regiment of the 3rd Cavalry Division, Istanbul Martial Court, Cavalry Regiment of the XIV Corps	Akhisar Area, Yenişehir and İnegöl Area, 61st Division (deputy), Ulukışla-Sivas-Kayseri Line, 7th Tribal Cavalry Division
Rüştü Sakarya	1877, Istanbul	Dec 2, 1951	State Cemetery	1311-b-P.70	–	1903	1909	1912	1921				16th Division	61st Division, Konya Area Command
Veysel Özgür	1877, Trabzon	Oct 15, 1931	State Cemetery	1311-b-P.83	–	1912	1916	1921					15th Regiment, 161st Regiment, 134th Regiment, 48th Division, Humus Area, 20th Division, 1st Division	15th Division, Provisional Division of Kocaeli Group, 7th Division, Çorum Military Service Department
Mehmet Emin Yazgan	1876, Istanbul	Feb 21, 1961, Istanbul		1311-b-P.88	–	1911	1916	1921	1927				16th Regiment, 6th Division, Inspector of the Depot Forces of the Sixth Army, 109th Regiment, İzmir Military Court	143rd Regiment, 2nd Regiment, Ankara Military Service Department, Sakarya Area of Kocaeli Group, İzmit Area, Infantry Brigade of the 7th Division, 18th Division, Inspector of Çorum Area
Ali Sait Akbaytoğan	1872, Manyas, Balıkesir	Mar 20, 1950	Zincirlikuyu Mezarlığı	1311-c-P.1	51st class	1907	1911	1913	1915	1923	1927		39th Division, XXV Corps, Istanbul Guard	Investigation Committee of Evliye-i Selâse, Military Supreme Court
Fevzi Çakmak	1876, Istanbul	Apr 10, 1950, Istanbul	Eyüp Sultan Mezarlığı	1311-c-P.7	51st class	1902	1910	1913	1915	1918	1921	1922	2nd Division, V Corps, II Caucasian Corps, Second Army, Seventh Army, First Army (deputy), Chief of the General Staff, War Minister	Prime Minister, Minister of National Defense, Chief of the General Staff
Vehbi Kıpçak	1875, Sevlievo	Jun 14, 1946, Istanbul		1311-c-P.8	51st class	1907	1910	1915	1928				24th Division, 32nd Division, Recruitment Committee of the XI Corps	Recruitment Committee of the XI Corps, Recruitment Committee of the X Corps
Ali	1874, Istanbul	?		1311-c-P.11	–	1914	1916	1922					6th Regiment	Diyarbakır Military Service Department, 18th Regiment, 2nd Division (deputy), 5th Division (deputy), Infantry Brigade of the 2nd Division, 2nd Division (deputy), Diyarbekir Military Court for Senior Officers
Arif Örgüç	1876, Istanbul	Apr, 1940, Istanbul	State Cemetery	1311-c-Sv.69	–	1910	1914	1921					14th Cavalry Regiment, 13th Provisional Cavalry Regiment, 13th Cavalry Regiment, Kurdistan Detachment of XIII Corps	Cavalry Depot Regiment of Western Front, 5th Cavalry Brigade, 1st Cavalry Division, Provisional Cavalry Division
Reşat Çiğiltepe	1879, Istanbul	August 27, 1922 †, Sandıklı	Sandıklı; State Cemetery	1311-c-P.80	–	1914	1916	1922					17th Regiment, 53rd Division	11th Caucasian Division, 21st Division, 57th Division
Nihat Anılmış	1876, Plovdiv	May 31, 1954	Zincirlikuyu Mezarlığı; State Cemetery	1312-P.4	52nd class	1907	1912	1914	1915	1928			Chief of Staff of the Second Army, Dardanelles Fortified Area Command, Gallipoli Southern Group, Second Army, Seventh Army (deputy), Second Army, Adana Area Command	El-Cezire Front, Military Supreme Court
Yakup Şevki Subaşı	1876, Harput	Dec 20, 1939, Istanbul	Karacaahmet Mezarlığı; State Cemetery	1312-P.5	52nd class	1907	1912	1914	1916	1922	1926		Bosporus Fortified Area Command, 19th Division, III Corps (deputy), XV Corps (deputy), XV Corps, XIV Corps, II Caucasian Corps, Ninth Army	Second Army
Yusuf Izzet	1876, Yozgat	Apr 15, 1922		1312-Sv.6	52nd class	1907	1912	1914	1915				2nd Cavalry Division, X Corps, I Caucasian Corps, XIV Corps, Northern Caucasus Command	Reserve Group of the Western Front, 3rd Group
Sami Sabit Karaman	1877, Damascus	?		1312-Sv.10	Germany	1910	1914	1917	1923				Independent Cavalry Brigade in Saros Area, Cavalry of the Iraq Front, 51st Division, 19th Division, Beyoğlu Area	6th Cavalry Division, 13th Division, Provisional Cavalry Division in Urfa
Muhittin Kurtiş	1876, Damascus	1952		1312-P.14	52nd class	1907	1911	1915	1931				22nd Regiment, 27th Division, 23rd Division, Inspector of the Rear Area of the Third Army, 60th Division, 61st Division, I Corps	–
Akif Erdemgil	1876, Debar	Mar 22, 1962	State Cemetery	1312-Sv.46	–	1911	1915	1921	1927				3rd Cavalry Division, Euphrates Detachment, Cavalry Brigade, Caucasian Cavalry Division	2nd Division
Şefik Aker	1877, Kastoria	Feb 6, 1964, Istanbul		1312-P.84	–	1908	1914	1916					27th Regiment, 19th Division, 59th Division, 49th Division, 57th Division, XXI Corps (deputy)	57th Division, Menderesler Group, 6th Division, Dinar-Menderes Area Command, Antalya Area Command, 7th Division, Special Military Court of the Western Front
Mehmet Sabri Erçetin	1876, Bursa	1956	Karacaahmet Mezarlığı; State Cemetery	1313-Top.17	–	1914	1917	1921	1922				3rd Artillery Regiment (deputy), Artillery Command of XX Corps,	41st Artillery Regiment, Konya, Konya Area Command, Left flank of the Uşak Front, Provisional Division of the XII Corps, 8th Division, 4th Division, 14th Division,
Nurettin Özsu	1879, Istanbul	Jun 9, 1937	State Cemetery	1313-P.256	–	1911	1914	1917	1922				17th Regiment, 39th Regiment, 31st Regiment, 3rd Division, Provisional Amman Division	7th Division, Provisional Division, 17th Division
Mehmet Emin Çolakoğlu	1878, Şarkîkaraağaç	?		1314-Top.4	Germany	1914	1916	1918	1924				13th Artillery Regiment, Artillery Command of the II Corps, Inspector of Artillery of the Third Army, Field Artillery School	Artillery Command of the Eastern Front, Kars Fortified Area Command, Erzurum Fortified Area Command, Kars Fortified Area Command
Şükrü Naili Gökberk	1876, Thessaloniki	Oct 26, 1936, Edirne	Edirnekapı Mezarlığı; State Cemetery	1314-P.13	54th class	1907	1915	1918	1922	1926			Chief of Staff of the 7th Division, 50th Division, 49th Division,	15th Division, Ankara Command, Committee for Occupation and Restitution of Adana Area, Mersin Area Command, III Corps
Ali Hikmet Ayerdem	1877, Bursa	Mar 21, 1939	Zincirlikuyu Mezarlığı; State Cemetery	1314-P.16	54th class	1907	1914	1918	1922	1926			Chief of Staff of the IV Corps, 49th Division, İzmir Railway	12th Division, Undersecretary of the Ministry of National Defense, II Corps
Refet Bele	1881, Thessaloniki	Oct 3, 1963	Zincirlikuyu Mezarlığı	1314-P.39	64th class	1913	1915	1916	1922				Division of the intelligence of the headquarters of the Fourth Army, 10th Division, 3rd Division, 11th Division, Inspector of the Rear Area of Jerusalem, 53rd Division, XXII Corps (deputy), XX Corps, Gendarmerie General Command, III Corps	Minister of Interior, Southern Part of the Western Front, Minister of Interior, Minister of National Defense, Representative of the TBMM government in Istanbul
Nazmi Solok	1876, Balıkesir	1956, Istanbul	Zincirlikuyu Mezarlığı; State Cemetery	1314-P.44	–	1915	1916	1921	1924	1930			44th Regiment (deputy), 3rd Regiment, 50th Division, Euphrates Group	57th Division, 1st Cavalry Division, Menderes Group, 1st Cavalry Division, 6th Division
Mehmet Atıf Ateşdağlı	1876, Crete	Dec 3, 1947, Istanbul		1314-Sv.48	–	1916	1917						Baghdad Gendarmerie Command, Beirut Gendarmerie Command, Musul Gendarmerie Battalion, Nablus Gendarmerie Battalion, 6th Camel Regiment, Beirut Gendarmerie Regiment, Eskişehir Area Command	24th Division
Şerif Yaçağaz	1876, Pazardzhik	Oct 5, 1938	State Cemetery	1314-P.94	–	1914	1916	1921					161st Regiment, Istanbul (vice),	Yozgat Area Command, 41st Division, 2nd Division, Istanbul
Sıtkı Üke	1876, Thessaloniki	1941	Zincirlikuyu Mezarlığı; State Cemetery	1314-İs.505	–	1910	1915	1921	1927				76th Regiment, Şile Depot Battalions, 127th Regiment of the 47th Division, 2nd Regiment of the 8th Division, 5th Division (deputy)	Infantry Brigade of the 24th Division, Infantry Brigade of the 11th Division, Infantry Brigade of the 8th Division, 9th Division, Cebelibereket Area Command, Adana Area Command, 4th Division
Fahrettin Altay	1880, Shkodër	1974	State Cemetery	1315-P.1	55th class	1909	1914	1915	1921	1922	1926		Chief of the General Staff of the III Corps, Deputy undersecretary of the Ministry of War, 6th Division, 26th Division, XV Corps (deputy), 26th Division, XII Corps, III Corps	XII Corps, V Cavalry Group, V Cavalry Corps
Ethem Servet Boral	1876, Caucasus	1956	State Cemetery	1315-P.16	55th class	1911	1915	1921					Commissariat of the Greek Border, 14th Regiment	Committee of the Purchase of Minister of National Defense, Supply General Command, 2nd Cavalry Division
Bekir Sami Günsav	1879, Bandırma	1934		1315-P.17	55th class	1910	1915	1916					43rd Regiment, 5th Expeditionary Force, 52nd Division, Chataldja Defense Line, Department of Export and Order	56th Division, XVII Corps (deputy), XX Corps, Muğla and Antalya Area Command, Military Representative to Northern Caucasus
Ahmet Nuri Öztekin	1876, Bandırma		State Cemetery	1315-P.26	55th class	1912	1914	1921					3rd division of the headquarters of the Third Army	3rd Caucasian Division, Yozgat Military Service Department, Tokat Military Service Department
Kâzım İnanç	1880, Diyarbakır	Sep, 21, 1938	Ankara Şehitliği; State Cemetery	1315-P.29	55th class	1909	1915	1915	1918	1924			Division of the Intelligence of the First Army, Division of the operations of the First Army, Chief of Staff of the Fifth Army, XIX Corps (deputy), Second Chief of the General Staff	Undersecretary of the Minister of National Defense, Secretariat of Commander-in-chief, VI Corps
Kâzım Dirik	1881, Bitola	Jul 3, 1941, Edirne	State Cemetery	1315-P.87	64th class	1913	1915	1916	1924	1928			Inspector of the Rear Area of the Second Army, Inspector of the Rear Area of the Fourth Army, 43rd Division, 7th Division, 56th Division, 49th Division, Inspector of the Rear Area in Batumi	Chief of the General Staff of the Ninth Army, Erzurum Fortified Area Command, XV Corps (deputy), Representative of TBMM government to Georgia, Inspector of the Rear Area of Western Anatolia, General Directorate of Shipping and Transportation
Selâhattin Âdil	1881, Istanbul	Feb 27, 1961	Zincirlikuyu Mezarlığı; State Cemetery	1315-b-Top.2	55th class	1908	1914	1915	1923				Chief of Staff of the Dardanelles Fortified Area Command, 12th Division, 13th Division, XI Corps, XIX Corps, XVII Corps, Dardanelles Fortified Area Command, XVII Corps, General Directorate of Military Manufacturing	II Corps, Undersecretary of the Ministry of National Defense, Istanbul Command
Celâl (Dz.)	1879, Istanbul			1315-Gv.315		1915	1922	1928					Naval Facilities of the Dead Sea, Vice Director of Istanbul Port, Gunboat Hızır Reis	Naval Undersecretary of the Kocaeli Command, Director of İzmit Port
Mehmet Hayrettin (Dz.)	1878, Istanbul			1315-Gv.321		1918	1921							Gunboat Preveze, Samsun Naval Detachment
Âsım Gündüz	1880, Kütahya	Jan 14, 1970	Zincirlikuyu Mezarlığı	1316-P.2	57th class	1911	1915	1918	1922	1926	1937		Chief of Staff of the III Corps, Chief of Staff of the Sinai Front, Vice Chief of Staff of the Eighth Army, 48th Division, Teacher of tactics in the Staff College, Teacher of Princes, 2nd division of the General Staff	Chief of Staff of the Western Front, Second Chief of the General Staff
Mehmet Hayri	1879, Konya			1316-Ağ.Top.2	56th class	1910	1915						1st Heavy Artillery Brigade, Chief of Staff of Chataldja Defense Line, Zonguldak Fortified Area Command, 44th Division, 52nd Division, Zonguldak Fortified Area Command, 6th Division, 53rd Division, 1st Division, 41st Division,	14th Cavalry Division, 7th Mounted Infantry Division
Cafer Tayyar Eğilmez	1877, Pristina	Jan 3, 1958	Karacaahmet Mezarlığı	1316-Sv.4	56th class	1910	1914	1915	1923				1st Division, II Corps, I Corps, II Corps, I Corps	Trakya Kuva-yi Milliye
Mürsel Bakû	1881, Erzurum	Feb 2, 1945	Zincirlikuyu Mezarlığı; State Cemetery	1316-Sv.7	56th class	1911	1914	1918	1922				11th Cavalry Brigade, 34th Division, 2nd Cavalry Division, 32nd Division, 12th Division, 5th Caucasian Division	6th Cavalry Division, 1st Cavalry Division
Mustafa Muğlalı	1882, Muğla	Dec 4, 1951, Istanbul	State Cemetery	1316-P.21	56th class	1914	1915	1922	1927	1931	1942		Chief of Staff of Adana Area Command, Chief of Staff of the X Corps, 44th Division	18th Division, 13th Division
Ömer Lütfi Argeşo	1879, Istanbul	1975		1316-P.25	56th class	1915	1918						78th Regiment	23rd Division, 18th Division
Mehmet Suphi Kula	1881, Bitola	Oct 19, 1948	State Cemetery	1316-Sv.57	–	1916	1921	1922	1927				Cavalry Company of the headquarters of the IX Corps, Verification Committee of Istanbul Central Command	6th Cavalry Division, 14th Cavalry Division
İbrahim Çolak	1881, Bursa	1944	Zincirlikuyu Mezarlığı; State Cemetery	1316-P.157	–	1916	1921	1922						2nd Mobile Forces, 3rd Cavalry Division
Mahmut Nedim Hendek	1880, Caucasus	Apr 21, 1920 †, Hendek	65th class State Cemetery	1316-Sv.484		1916	1918						Chief aide-de-camp of the Second Army, Chief of Staff of the 3rd Cavalry Division, Chief of Staff of the XII Corps	24th Division
Ali İhsan Sâbis	1882, Istanbul	Dec 9, 1957	Zincirlikuyu Mezarlığı	1317-Top.1	57th class	1911	1914	1915	1917				1st division of the General headquarters, Chief of Staff of the Second Army, XIII Corps (deputy), General Reserve of the Third Army, XI Corps (deputy), 1st Expeditionary Force, IX Corps, XIII Corps, IV Corps, Sixth Army	First Army
Mehmet Hayri Tarhan	1880, Malko Tarnovo	Dec 11, 1934	Ankara Şehitliği; State Cemetery	1317-P.4	57th class	1912	1916	1921	1929				Chief of Staff of the XV Corps, Chief of Staff of the XVI Corps, 2nd division of the General headquarters, Chief of Staff of the II Corps, Chief of Staff of the XV Corps, 42nd Division, 12th Division, 26th Division, Chief of Staff of the Seventh Army, Vice General Inspector of the Military Schools	Chief of Staff of Adana Front, Maraş Division, 9th Division, Inspector of Yahşihan Rear Area, Gaziantep Area Command, General Inspector of the Military Schools
Mustafa Kemal Atatürk	1881, Thessaloniki	Nov 10, 1938, Istanbul	Ethnography Museum; Anıtkabir	1317-P.8	57th class	1911	1914	1915	1916			1921	19th Division, Anafartalar Group, XVI Corps, Second Army (deputy), Seventh Army, Yıldırım Army Group, Inspector of the Ninth Army (Third Army)	Speaker of the TBMM, Commander-in-chief of the Army of the TBMM government
Cavit Erdel	1884, Edirne	Mar 5, 1933	57th class State Cemetery	1317-P.14		1912	1916	1922	1927				Chief of Staff of the 42nd Division, Chief of Staff of Chataldja Defense Line, Chief of Staff of the IX Corps, 17th Division (deputy), Chief of Staff of the I Caucasian Corps, 11th Caucasian Division	11th Caucasian Division, Kars Fortified Area Command
Mehmet Arif	1882, Adana	Jul 13, 1926, İzmir		1317-P.17	57th class	1915	1918	1921					Chief of Staff of the 5th Division, Infantry School, Chief of Staff of the Inspectorate of Rear Area of the Eastern Armies	11th Division, 3rd Group, III Corps
Ali Fuat Cebesoy	1882, Istanbul	Jan 10, 1968, Istanbul	Alifuatpaşa Camii	1317-P.28	57th class	1911	1914	1915	1917	1923	1926		Chief of Staff of VII Corps, 25th Division, 14th Division, 5th Division, Chief of Staff of the Second Army, Vice Commander of the Sinai-Palestine Front, XX Corps, Seventh Army (deputy)	XX Corps, General Commander of Kuva-yi Milliye in the Western Anatolia, Western Front, Ambassador of the TBMM government to Moscow, Deputy Speaker of the TBMM, Second Army
İsmail Hakkı Bey	1883, Istanbul	Jun 4, 1923		1317-P.59		1913	1916	1921					7th Regiment, 51st Division (deputy), 14th Division (deputy), 14th Division	11th Caucasian Division, Kars Fortified Area Command, Inspector of the Thrace 4th Gendarmerie Area
Ahmet F. Bulca	1881, Thessaloniki	Sep 14, 1962	Erenköy Sahrâ-yı Cedid Mezarlığı; State Cemetery	1317-P.80	–	1915	1921	1924					23rd Regiment	Infantry Brigade of the 1st Division, 1st Division (deputy), 20th Division, 11th Division, Ankara Command
Kâzım Karabekir	1882, Istanbul	Jan 25, 1948	Ankara Hava Şehitliği; State Cemetery	1318-P.1	58th class	1912	1914	1915	1918	1920	1923		1st Expeditionary Force, 14th Division, Chief of Staff of the Sixth Army, XVIII Corps, II Corps, I Caucasian Corps, XIV Corps, XV Corps	Eastern Front, First Army
Mehmet Emin Koral	1881, Istanbul	Aug 12, 1959, Istanbul	Büyükada	1318-Ağ.Top.1	58th class	1912	1915	1916	1922	1926			17th Division, 59th Division, Vice chief of the 15th division of Inspectorate of the Heavy Artillery in General headquarters, 61st Division, Bosporus Fortified Area Command, Provisional Division, 2nd division of the General Staff	Chief of Staff of the First Army, İzmir Fortified Area Command
Sadullah Güney	1883, Istanbul	?		1318-Kale Top.1	58th class	1912	1916	1921					Chief of Staff of the VIII Corps, Inspector of the Rear Area of the Fourth Army, Chief of Staff of the Inspectorate of the Rear Area, Chief of Staff of the Eighth Army, Central division of General headquarters, General Director of Seyri Sefain, 2nd division of the General Staff	16th Division, Inspector of the Rear Area of the Western Front, General Directorate of Shipping and Transportation, Deputy undersecretary of the Ministry of National Defense
Mehmet Dalbaşar	1886, Istanbul	Mar 23, 1935	Edirnekapı Mezarlığı; State Cemetery	1318-Sv.7	64th class	1915	1918	1922	1926	1931			Chief of Staff of the Provisional Cavalry Brigade, Chief of Staff of the XIII Corps, 5th Division, XIII Corps (deputy)	41st Division, Commissar of Southern Border, Ankara Area Command
Seyfi Düzgören	1880, Istanbul	Dec 28, 1948		1318-P.14	58th class	1912	1916	1921	1927				Chief of Staff of the 1st Division, Division of the Intelligence of the General headquarters	3rd Caucasian Division (deputy), 13th Caucasian Division, Chief of Staff of the Eastern Front
Mehmet Nuri Conker	1882, Thessaloniki	Jan 2, 1937	Ankara Şehitliği; State Cemetery	1318-P.15	58th class	1912	1915	1920					Chief of Staff of the 1st Division, 24th Regiment, Military attaché to The Hague	General Director of the Press and Intelligence, Ankara Command, 41st Division
Mehmet Hulusi Conk	1881, İzmir	Jan 10, 1950	58th class State Cemetery	1318-P.24	58th class	1913	1918	1922					Chief of Staff of the XVII Corps, Chief of Staff of the XIX Corps, Chief of Staff of the XIV Corps, 176th Regiment, 60th Division, 61st Division, Chief of Staff of the XX Corps	Army Office of the Ministry of National Defense, 24th Division, 18th Division
Kâzım Özalp	1882, Veles	Jun 6, 1968	Ankara Şehitliği; State Cemetery	1318-P.29	58th class	1914	1915	1917	1921	1922	1926		Van Gendarmerie Regiment, Van Mobile Gendarmerie Division, 36th Division, 37th Caucasian Division, VI Corps (deputy), 60th Division, 61st Division, XIV Corps (deputy)	Kocaeli Area Command, Provisional Corps, III Corps, Minister of National Defense
Ethem Necdet Karabudak	1882, Çal	Jul 13, 1946	Bakırköy Mezarlığı	1318-P.31	58th class	1915	1921	1922					153rd Regiment (deputy), 155th Regiment (deputy)	14th Division
Cemil Cahit Toydemir	1883, Istanbul	Jul 15, 1956	Edirnekapı Şehitliği; State Cemetery	1318-P.311	–	1915	1918	1921	1927	1933	1942		53rd Regiment, 33rd Division (deputy), 4th Caucasian, 1st Caucasian Division	5th Caucasian, 10th Division, Inspector of the Thrace 1st Gendarmerie Area
İsmet İnönü	1884, İzmir	1973	Anıtkabir	1319-Sah.Top.1	59th class	1912	1914	1915	1921	1922	1926		1st division of the General headquarters, Chief of Staff of the Second Army, IV Corps, XX Corps, III Corps, Undersecretary of the Ministry of War, General Secretary of the Documentation in the Military Council	Minister of the Chief of the General Staff, Northern Flank of the Western Front, Western Front, Minister of Foreign Affairs
Şefik Avni Özüdoğru	1884, Samsun	Jul 3, 1960		1319-İs.1	59th class	1915	1918						1st division of the Third Army, 17th Division (deputy), Chief of Staff of the XV Corps, Chief of Staff of the XIV Corps, Chief of Staff of the IV Corps, Chief of Staff of the Sinai Front, Chief of Staff of the III Corps, Chief of Staff of the VIII Corps, 55th Division (deputy)	15th Division
İzzettin Çalışlar	1882, Ioannina	Aug 20, 1951	Edirnekapı Şehitliği; State Cemetery	1319-Top.2	59th class	1914	1916	1921	1922	1926	1930		Chief of Staff of Edirne Kalesi Command, Chief of Staff of the 19th Division, Chief of Staff of the XVI Corps, Chief of Staff of the Anafartalar Group, Chief of Staff of the Second Army, 4th division of the General headquarters	XX Corps (deputy), 23rd Division, 61st Division, 1st Group, I Corps
Nafiz Gürman	1882, Bodrum	Feb 6, 1966	Zincirlikuyu Mezarlığı; State Cemetery	1319-P.5	59th class	1913	1917	1921	1926	1930	1940		Chief of Staff of the Aleppo Regular Division, Chief of Staff of the 26th Division, Military advisor of Tolipolitania, Chief of Staff of the Africa Groups, 148th Regiment, Chief of Staff of the Africa Groups, Chief of Staff of the I Corps	1st Division, Chief of Staff of the Thrace Command
Alâaddin Koval	1882, Istanbul	Aug 8, 1930	Karacaahmet Mezarlığı; State Cemetery	1319-P.8	59th class	1914	1916	1922	1927				Chief of Staff of the 4th Division, Chief of Staff of the II Corps, 55th Division (deputy), 55th Division	Chief of Staff of the El-Cezire Front, 41st Division
Aşir Atlı	1881, Kilis	Oct 23, 1957	State Cemetery	1319-P.23	59th class	1914	1916	1921	1925				Naval Commissar of the General Staff, Staff of the Iraq Area Command, 1st division of the Sixth Army, 1st Regiment, 2nd Division (deputy), 2nd Division, 23rd Division	Commander of Kuva-yi Milliye in İzmir Eastern Front, Governor of Antalya Province and Area Command, 16th Division
Halit Karsıalan	1883, Istanbul	Feb 14, 1925	State Cemetery	1319-P.257	–	1915	1916	1920	1922				Mürettep Teşkilat-ı Mahsusa Regiment, Independent Artvin Detachment, Çoruh Detachment, Western Dersim Area Command, 3rd Caucasian Division	9th Caucasian Division, Kocaeli Group, 12th Group, Kocaeli Group
İbrahim Münir (Dz.)	1885, Istanbul	Oct 23, 1930		1319-Gv.696		1921	1926						Batumi Port	Samsun Naval Detachment, Trabzon Naval Transportation Command, Senior Naval Officer at Novorossiysk
Cemal Çakar (Dz.)	1883, Safranbolu	?		1319-Gv.704		1921	1927						Giresun Port, Gunboat Aydın Reis	Samsun Naval Detachment, İnebolu Loading and Unloading Command
Osman Zati Koral	1880, İzmir	Sep 21, 1946	State Cemetery	1320-Ağ.Top.1	60th class	1915	1921	1922	1927				Staff of the Dardanelles Fortified Area Command	Chief of Staff of Ankara Command, Infantry Brigade of the 1st Division, 3rd Cavalry Division (deputy), Infantry Brigade of the 1st Division, 1st Cavalry Division, Deputy Chief of Staff of the Western Front
Kâzım Orbay	1887, İzmir	Jun 3, 1964	Zincirlikuyu Mezarlığı; State Cemetery	1320-Sah.Top.1	60th class	1914	1916	1918	1922	1926	1935		Staff of the 3rd Division, Central division of the Chief of the General Staff, Chief aide-de-camp of the War Minister, Deputy Undersecretary of the Ministry of War	Chief of Staff of the Eastern Front, Army Office of the Ministry of National Defense, 3rd Caucasian Division
Naci Tınaz	1882, Servia	Nov 25, 1964	Ankara Şehitliği; State Cemetery	1320-P.3	60th class	1916	1921	1922	1926	1930			Chief of Staff of the I Corps (deputy), 1st division of the III Corps (deputy), Chief of Staff of the III Corps, Chief of Staff of the XX Corps, Deputy Director of the 2nd division of the General Staff	Chief of Staff of the Western Front, 15th Division
Hüseyin Hüsnü Emir Erkilet	1883, Istanbul	1958	Ankara Asrî Mezarlığı	1320-P.5	60th class	1915	1917	1922	1926				Delegation to the Army Group Mackensen, Chief of Staff of the XIV Corps, Deputy Chief of Staff of the Yıldırım Army Group, Chief of Staff of the Fourth Army, Chief of Staff of the Eighth Army, 46th Division, Chief of Staff of the Ninth Army, Chief of Staff of the Second Army, 3rd division of the General Staff, Chief of the Council of Military History, Military attaché to Bern	7th Division, Chief of Staff of the Second Army, 1st Division
Kemalettin Sami Gökçen	1884, Sinop	Apr 15, 1934	Eyüpsultan 16 Mart Şehitliği; State Cemetery	1321-İs.1	61st class	1914	1917	1921	1922	1926			Chief of Staff of the Dardanelles Fortified Area Command, Staff of the Gallipoli Northern Group, Chief of Staff of the Inspectorate of Fortification and Fortified Area, Chief of Staff of the Hejaz Expeditionary Force, Chief of Staff of the VIII Corps, Military attaché to Ukraine, Chief of Staff of the Northern Caucasus Army, Inspector of the Rear Area of the Ninth Army, 10th Caucasian Division (deputy), Istanbul Guard, Deputy Commander of the XXV Corps, 10th Caucasian Division	1st Division, Ankara Command, 4th Group, IV Corps
Ahmet Zeki Soydemir	1883, Thessaloniki	Sep 4, 1954	State Cemetery	1321-P.5	61st class	1915	1921	1922	1927				21st Regiment (deputy), Staff of the II Corps, Chief of Staff of the 48th Division, Chief of Staff of the III Corps	7th Mounted Infantry Division (deputy), Chief of Staff of the Southern Front, 6th Division, Provisional Division, 2nd Cavalry Division
Sabit Noyan	1887, Istanbul	1967	Zincirlikuyu Mezarlığı; State Cemetery	1321-P.30	61st class	1914	1921	1922	1927	1935	1945		Chief of Staff of the Independent Hejaz Division, Chief of Staff of the Hejaz Command, 4th division of the General Staff	Officer Candidate School, 190th Regiment, Deputy Inspector of the Military Schools, Infantry Brigade of the 6th Division, Supply Staff of the First Army, 57th Division
Ömer Halis Bıyıktay	1883, Erzincan	Dec 25, 1939, Istanbul	State Cemetery	1321-P.44	65th class	1918	1921	1922	1927	1934			Staff of the Iraq Area Command, Chief of Staff of the 6th Division, Chief of Staff of the 52nd Division, Staff of Euphrates Group, Deputy chief of the 1st division of the Seventh Army, Chief of Staff of the XX Corps, 172nd Regiment	23rd Division
Halit Akmansü	1884, Kastamonu	Feb 10, 1953	State Cemetery	1322-Top.2	62nd class	1916	1921	1922					Staff of the Iraq Area Command, Staff of the 52nd Division, 1st division of the Sixth Army, Chief of Staff of the XVIII Corps, Chief of Staff of the XXIV Corps	Maraş Area Command, Department of Transportation of National Defense, 3rd Caucasian Division, 5th Caucasian Division
Ahmet Derviş	1884, Giannitsa	Jan 17, 1932	Zincirlikuyu Mezarlığı; State Cemetery	1322-P.26	62nd class	1914	1921	1922	1926	1930			Chief of Staff of the Hejaz Division, Chief of Staff of the 61st Division	Chief of Staff of the 61st Division, 1st Cavalry Group, 7th Division, 11th Division, General Supply Department
Salih Omurtak	1889, Istanbul	1954	State Cemetery	1323-P.1	63rd class	1916	1921	1922	1926	1930	1940		1st division of the Eastern Army Group, Deputy Chief of Staff of the Third Army, 1st division of the General headquarters, Chief aide-de-camp of the Ministry of War,	Division of operations of the General Staff, Deputy Chief of the General Staff (deputy), 61st Division
Mehmet Nâzım	1886, Kayseri	Jul 15, 1921 †, Yumruçal	Ankara Şehitliği; State Cemetery	1323-P.3	63rd class	1916	1921	1921					Chief of Staff of the 16th Division, Chief of Staff of the 19th Division, Delegation to the Army Group Mackensen, Rumelia Detachment, 7th Cavalry Regiment	Provisional Division, 4th Division
Hulusi Gökdalay (Dz.)	1883, İzmir	Oct 18, 1955		1323-Gv.803		1921	1925	1931	1937				Kaiserliche Marine	Navy Office of the Ministry of National Defense
Mustafa Fahri (Dz.)	1887, Edremit	?		1323-Gv.809		1921	1925						Second commander of the training ship Peyk	Trabzon Transportation Command
Şevket Doruker (Dz.)	1884, Istanbul	1956		1323-Gv.814		1921	1922							Chief of Navy Office of the Ministry of National Defense
Necip Okaner (Dz.)	1886, Istanbul	1959		1323-Gv.817		1922								Fethiye Naval Group
Mehmet Fazıl (Hv.)	1889, Shkodër	Jan 27, 1923		1326-Hv.41		1922							12th Flight Squadron, Flight Squadron of the Istanbul Air Defense Command	Kartal Flight Detachment, 2nd Flight Squadron, Flight Squadron of the Western Front, Aircraft Group

== See also ==
- Turkish State Cemetery#Burials
- List of recipients of the Medal of Independence with Red-Green Ribbon (Turkey)
