= Directorate of Anti-Smuggling, Intelligence, Operations and Information Gathering =

- Kaçakçılık, İstihbarat, Harekat ve Bilgi Toplama Dairesi Başkanlığı

Agency overview
- Formed: 20 November 1981
- Preceding agency: Anti-Smuggling Intelligence and Operations Center
- Headquarters: Kıbrıs Caddesi, Boncuk Sokak, No:10/A Kurtuluş, Ankara
- Agency executive: Ömer Ulu, Acting Director
- Parent agency: Ministry of Interior
- Website: www.kihbi.gov.tr

Directorate of Anti-Smuggling, Intelligence, Operations and Information Gathering (Turkish: Kaçakçılık, İstihbarat, Harekât ve Bilgi Toplama Dairesi Başkanlığı), or commonly known by its abbreviation KİHBİ, is a directorate established on 20 November 1981 under the Ministry of Interior of the Republic of Turkey. The Directorate was established under an Assistant Undersecretary appointed at the ministerial level for the purpose of planning, directing, coordinating and evaluating intelligence on smuggling throughout the Republic of Turkey, as well as directing and administering operations to be conducted in accordance with intelligence assessments.

== History and organizational structure ==
At its meeting on 21 November 1978, the Council of Ministers of the Republic of Turkey, through Decision No. 237, assigned responsibility for intelligence related to smuggling to the Ministry of the Interior and provided for the establishment of an Intelligence and Operations Center within the Ministry for this purpose. Following this decision, the Directorate was established within the Ministry of the Interior of the Republic of Turkey by Decision No. 8/3871 of the Council of Ministers dated 20 November 1981, initially in accordance with the principles governing the operation of the Anti-Smuggling Intelligence and Operations Center. On 24 December 1982, the KİHBİ Board Presidency was established, and following the amendment and adoption on 14 February 1985 of the decree reorganizing the organizational structure of the Ministry of the Interior, originally issued on 13 December 1983, the Directorate assumed its current name, Directorate of Anti-Smuggling, Intelligence, Operations and Information Gathering.

With the change of the Directorate's name, the Information Gathering Department, which was attached to the Directorate and is popularly known as GBT (General Information Gathering), was added to the Directorate on 26 March 1980 with the approval of the Ministry of the Interior. The establishment of this department was jointly proposed by the Gendarmerie General Command and the General Directorate of Security. Because the newly established department was incorporated into the Directorate, its name was merged into the Directorate's title. However, the Information Gathering Department forms part of the organizational structure of the Directorate of Anti-Smuggling, Intelligence, Operations and Information Gathering and is not regarded as a separate organizational entity.

The Directorate of Anti-Smuggling, Intelligence, Operations and Information Gathering carries out its duties through four subordinate departments.

== Establishment of the Anti-Smuggling Intelligence Coordination Board ==
The Board convenes under the chairmanship of the Undersecretary or an Assistant Undersecretary of the Ministry of the Interior, with the participation of the following members:

- Head of the Counter-Intelligence and Security Department of the Turkish General Staff
- Head of Intelligence of the Turkish Land Forces
- Head of Intelligence of the National Intelligence Organization
- Head of the Anti-Smuggling and Organized Crime Department of the Gendarmerie General Command
- Head of the Anti-Smuggling and Organized Crime Department of the General Directorate of Security
- Head of Intelligence of the Turkish Coast Guard
- Director General of Customs
- Director General of Customs Enforcement
- Head of the KİHBİ Directorate

When deemed necessary, representatives of other ministries, public institutions, organizations, and provincial governorships may also be invited by the Ministry of the Interior.

== Duties ==
=== Duties of KİHBİ ===
KİHBİ's primary duties are to collect, plan, direct, and coordinate anti-smuggling intelligence. However, the specific duties to be carried out by the Directorate are determined by the Anti-Smuggling Intelligence Coordination Board (KİK Board), which convenes under the chairmanship of the Undersecretary or an Assistant Undersecretary of the Ministry of the Interior of the Republic of Turkey. This Board is the highest decision-making body of the Directorate. It evaluates smuggling activities directed against the Republic of Turkey, both domestically and abroad, and determines the measures to be taken in combating identified smuggling activities.

=== Duties of the Chair of the KİHBİ Board ===
The Chair of the KİHBİ Board establishes the principles for the centralized collection, planning, implementation, and coordination of intelligence concerning all forms of smuggling activities. The Chair also prepares directives on these matters.

=== Duties of the Information Gathering Department ===
The Department's primary duty is to ensure the apprehension of identified wanted persons who have evaded arrest in connection with criminal offenses, as well as the recovery of stolen motor vehicles, firearms of all types, and identity documents. For this purpose, information obtained from every province of Turkey is collected at a central database by the Information Gathering Department and recorded. General law enforcement agencies in Turkey can readily access these records from anywhere in the country. This is intended to improve the effectiveness of law enforcement in apprehending offenders and to enhance public confidence in the police. It also facilitates the prompt completion of judicial and administrative investigations.

As of 1 January 2012, the Information Gathering Department's database, also referred to as KİHBİ, began to be used jointly with the UYAP system. As a result, general law enforcement agencies throughout Turkey are also able to query arrest records relating to wanted persons contained within UYAP. However, law enforcement personnel querying an individual through the KİHBİ Information Gathering Department database cannot view that person's criminal record. Criminal records are maintained within the UYAP system. Furthermore, disclosing this information to third parties or to the individual concerned during or after an inquiry is prohibited. Criminal records maintained by UYAP can now also be accessed through the e-Devlet website. In addition, individuals may apply to provincial police directorates to obtain any KİHBİ records concerning themselves by citing Decision No. 2012/83, dated 27 January 2012, which is also available on the website of the Board of Review of Access to Information (BEDK), operating under the Prime Ministry.

== Directors ==
To date, seven individuals have served as Director of KİHBİ. A list of the Directors of KİHBİ is provided below.

Adı Soyadı	Görev Süresi
Mehmet Şahin	1982–1983
Retired Brigadier General Hasan Ali Özer	1983–1986
Halil Tiryaki	1988–2000
Hürrem Aksoy (acting)	2000–2001
Dr. Ömer Faruk Günay	2001–2011
Mustafa Çöğgün	2011–2014
Dr. Ömer Toraman	2014–2015
Ömer Ulu (acting)	2015–present
