= Ali Bey (disambiguation) =

Ali Bey usually refers to Ali Bey al-Kabir (1728–1773), a Mamluk leader of Egypt.

Ali Bey or Ali Beg may also refer to:

== People ==
- Mihaloğlu Ali Bey (1425–1507), Ottoman military commander and sanjakbey of Smederevo
- Ali Bey Evrenosoglu, or simply Ali Bey, fifteenth-century Ottoman military commander
- Ali Bey, Prince of Dulkadir (fl. 1515), governor of Dulkadir
- Mir Ali Beg (Ottoman corsair) (died after 1589), Ottoman corsair on the Swahili coast
- Wojciech Bobowski (1610–1675), also known as Ali Bey, Polish musician and translator of the Bible into Turkish
- Ali Bey of Tunis (d. 1682), a Muradid
- Ali Bey al-Abbasi (1766–1818), pseudonym of Domènec Badia i Leblich, Spanish explorer and spy
- Mir Ali Beg I of Sheikhan (r. 1809–1833), Yazidi prince of Sheikhan
- Ali Bey (officer), Mehmet Ali Bey (1874–?), Ottoman and Turkish officer
- Ali Çetinkaya, "Kel" Ali Bey (1878–1949), Ottoman-Turkish officer and politician
- Ali Kemal Bey (1867–1922), Ottoman journalist, newspaper editor and poet
- Ali Kılıç, Kılıç Ali Bey (1890–1971), Ottoman-Turkish officer and politician
- Nawab Muhammad Ali Beg (born 1852), Indian Army officer

== Other uses ==
- Ali Bey, an 1818 book by Samuel Lorenzo Knapp

== See also ==
- Geli Ali Beg Waterfall, Iraqi Kurdistan
- Awakening, or Ali Bey’s Experiences, an 1874 novel by Namık Kemal
