= Sami Sabit Karaman =

Sami Sabit Karaman 1312-Sv. 10
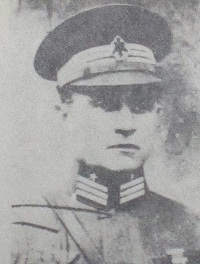
- Born: 1877; Damascus, Ottoman Empire
- Died: 4 September 1957 (aged 79–80); Istanbul, Turkey
- Military career
- Allegiance: Ottoman Empire; Turkey
- Service years: Ottoman: 1899–1918; Turkey: April, 1921 – September 28, 1931
- Rank: Mirliva
- Commands: Independent Cavalry Brigade in Saros Area, Cavalry of the Iraq Front, 51st Division, 19th Division, Beyoğlu Area; 6th Cavalry Division, 13th Division, Provisional Cavalry Division in Urfa, 9th Division, Cavalry Inspector of Istanbul, 61st Division, 2nd Division
- Conflicts: Italo-Turkish War; Balkan Wars; First World War; Turkish War of Independence

Sami Sabit Karaman (1877 – 4 September 1957) was an officer of the Ottoman Army and a general of the Turkish Army.

== Works ==
- İstiklâl Mücadelesi ve Enver Paşa

== Translations ==
- Mısır'da Napolyon
- Karadağ Muharebesi
- Kara Subaylarına Mahsus Hukuku Harb
- Süvarinin Hidemat-ı Seferiyeye İhzarı
- Yahudi Tarihi ve Siyon Önderlerinin Protokolları (The Protocols of the Elders of Zion ), Yeni Cezaevi Matbaası, 1943.

== See also ==
- List of high-ranking commanders of the Turkish War of Independence
