= Mehmet Atıf Ateşdağlı =

Officer of the Ottoman Army and of the Turkish Army

Mehmet Atıf Ateşdağlı 1314-Sv. 48
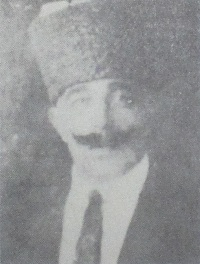
- Born: 1876; Crete, Ottoman Empire
- Died: 3 December 1947 (aged 70–71); Istanbul, Turkey
- Military career
- Allegiance: Ottoman Empire; Turkey
- Service years: Ottoman: 1899–1919; Turkey: 1920–October 27, 1926
- Rank: Kaymakam
- Commands: Baghdad Gendarmerie Command, Beirut Gendarmerie Command, Musul Gendarmerie Battalion, Nablus Gendarmerie Battalion, 6th Camel Regiment, Beirut Gendarmerie Regiment, Eskişehir Area Command; 24th Division
- Conflicts: Balkan Wars; First World War; Turkish War of Independence

Mehmet Atıf Ateşdağlı (1876; Crete – December 3, 1947; Istanbul) was an officer of the Ottoman Army and of the Turkish Army.

== Medals and decorations ==
- Order of the Medjidie 4th class
- Silver Medal of Liyakat
- Gallipoli Star (Ottoman Empire)
- Medal of Independence with Red Ribbon and Citation

== See also ==
- List of high-ranking commanders of the Turkish War of Independence
