= General Directorate of Customs Protection =

- Gümrükler Muhafaza Genel Müdürlüğü

- Flag

Agency overview
- Formed: 1976
- Preceding agencies: Borders Conservation Office (1859); Customs Enforcement General Command (1917)
- Agency executive: Bekir Can Uslu, General manager
- Parent department: Office of the President of Turkey
- Parent agency: Ministry of Trade
- Child agencies: Regional Offices; Section Offices
- Website: muhafaza.ticaret.gov.tr

In Turkey, the General Directorate of Customs Protection (Turkish: Gümrükler Muhafaza Genel Müdürlüğü) is a special law enforcement agency responsible for controlling international transports to the country, checking goods and passenger movements, and enforcing laws that prevent economical losses due to smuggling offenses.

== Ranks ==
The system of the Customs Protection consists of a total of four ranks.

Manager	Chief		Officer
Customs Enforcement; Smuggling and Intelligence Manager	Customs Enforcement; Regional Supervisor	Customs Enforcement; Section Supervisor	Customs Enforcement; Officer

== List of general managers ==
- Major general Seyfi Düzgören (1932–1939)
- Major general Lütfü Karapınar (1939–1943)
- Major general Emin Çınar (1943–1947)
- Major general Abdülhalim Oruz (1948–1949)
- Major general Mümtaz Ulusoy (1949–1952)
- Major general Muhittin Salur (1952–1953)
- Lieutenant general Hayati Ataker (1955–1956)
- Tayyip İlter (1957–1971)
- Kemal Günel (1971–1975)
- Rıfat Ergun (1975–1976)
- Hayrettin Hanağası (1976–1977)
- Sıtkı Kadakal (1977–1978)
- Hayrettin Hanağası (1978–1984)
- Alper Özarslan (1984–1993)
- Şahin Sezer (1993–1994)
- Bahri Öktem (1994–1995)
- Şahin Sezer (1995–2000)
- Ünal Gökalp (acting) (2000)
- Hakkı Teke (acting) (2000–2003)
- Cihan Ancın (2003–2005)
- Dr. Ali Yılmaz (acting) (2005)
- Ramazan Ulus (acting) (2005–2006)
- Cemil Emre (acting) (2006)
- Ali Nural (acting) (2006–2007)
- Hayrettin Cevher (acting) (2007–2008)
- Neşet Akkoç (2007–2011)
- Yusuf Güney (2011–2013)
- Abdullah Soylu (2013–2019)
- Murat Yaman (2019–)
