= Vehbi Kıpçak =

Turkish general (1875–1946)

Vehbi Kıpçak 1311-c-P. 8
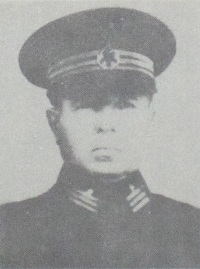
- Born: 1875; Servi (Sevlievo), Ottoman Empire
- Died: 14 June 1946 (aged 70–71)
- Military career
- Allegiance: Ottoman Empire; Turkey
- Service years: Ottoman: 1896–1920; Turkey: 1920 – August 24, 1935
- Rank: Mirliva
- Commands: 24th Division, 32nd Division, Recruitment Committee of the XI Corps; Recruitment Committee of the XI Corps, Recruitment Committee of the X Corps, 3rd division of the General Staff, 23rd Division, Military History Council of the General Staff
- Conflicts: Balkan Wars; First World War; Turkish War of Independence

Vehbi Kıpçak (1875; Servi (Sevlievo) – June 14, 1946; İstanbul) was an officer of the Ottoman Army and a general of the Turkish Army.

== See also ==
- List of high-ranking commanders of the Turkish War of Independence
