= Akif Erdemgil =

Turkish politician

Akif Erdemgil 1312-Sv. 46
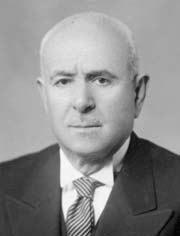
- Born: 1876; Debre-i Bala (Debar), Ottoman Empire
- Died: 22 March 1962 (aged 85–86)
- Military career
- Allegiance: Ottoman Empire; Turkey
- Service years: Ottoman: 1896-1919; Turkey: 1919-December 16, 1935
- Rank: Mirliva
- Commands: 3rd Cavalry Division, Euphrates Detachment, Cavalry Brigade, Caucasian Cavalry Division; 2nd Division, Urfa National Operational Command, Vice governor of Siirt Mutasarrifate, El Cezire Front (deputy), Provisional 3rd Cavalry Division, 16th Division, Istanbul Commission of the Minister of National Defense, 14th Cavalry Division, 2nd Cavalry Division, member of the Military Court of Cassation
- Conflicts: Italo-Turkish War; Balkan Wars; First World War; Turkish War of Independence

Akif Erdemgil (1876; Debre-i Bala (Debar) - March 22, 1962) was an officer of the Ottoman Army and a general of the Turkish Army.

== See also ==
- List of high-ranking commanders of the Turkish War of Independence
