= Mehmet Hayri Bey =

Ottoman-Turkish military officer (1879–1928)

Mehmet Hayri Bey 1316-Ağ. Top. 1
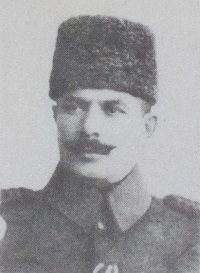
- Born: 1879; Konya, Konya Vilayet, Ottoman Empire
- Died: 1928 (aged 48–49); Turkey
- Military career
- Allegiance: Ottoman Empire; Turkey
- Service years: Ottoman: January 26, 1901–1920; Turkey, 1920 – May 18, 1921
- Rank: Kaymakam
- Commands: 1st Heavy Artillery Brigade, Chief of Staff of Chataldja Defense Line, Zonguldak Fortified Area Command, 44th Division, 52nd Division, Zonguldak Fortified Area Command, 6th Division, 53rd Division, 1st Division, 41st Division; 14th Cavalry Division, 7th Mounted Infantry Division
- Conflicts: Balkan Wars; First World War; Turkish War of Independence
- Other work: Consul in Urmia; Consul in Skopje

Mehmet Hayri Bey (1879, in Konya – 1928?) was a Turkish officer of both the Ottoman and Turkish Army. He was also a diplomat.

== Medals and decorations ==
- Order of Osmanieh with Sword 3rd class
- Prussia Iron Cross 2nd class
- Gallipoli Star (Ottoman Empire)
- Silver Medal of Imtiyaz
- Medal of Independence with Red Ribbon

== See also ==
- List of high-ranking commanders of the Turkish War of Independence
