= Muhittin Kurtiş =

Muhittin Kurtiş 1312-P. 14
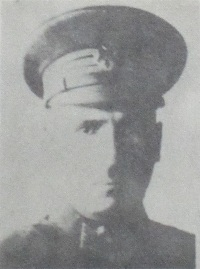
- Born: 1876; Damascus, Ottoman Empire
- Military career
- Allegiance: Ottoman Empire; Turkey
- Service years: Ottoman: 1896–1920; Turkey: March 1921 – July 19, 1923 / July 4, 1924 – July 10, 1936
- Rank: Mirliva
- Commands: 22nd Regiment, 27th Division, 23rd Division, Inspector of the Rear Area of the Third Army, 60th Division, 61st Division, I Corps member of court for senior officers of the Minister of National Defense, Brigade of the 17th Division, Eastern Border Command, Brigade of the 9th Division, 9th Division (deputy), 9th Division, member of the Military Court of Cassation
- Conflicts: Italo-Turkish War; Balkan Wars; First World War; Turkish War of Independence

Muhittin Kurtiş (1876; Damascus, Ottoman Empire – 1951; Istanbul, Turkey) was an officer of the Ottoman Army and the general of the Turkish Army.

== See also ==
- List of high-ranking commanders of the Turkish War of Independence
