= Cemil Conk =

Officer of the Ottoman Army and a general of the Turkish Army

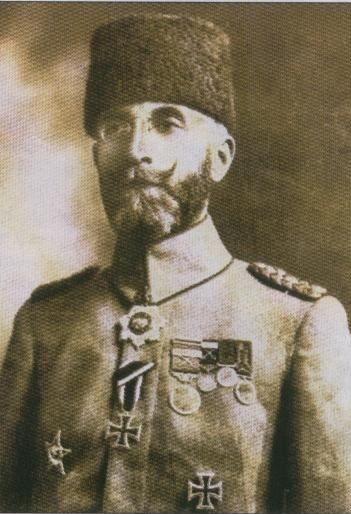
- Born: 1873; Üsküdar İstanbul, Ottoman Empire
- Died: 1963 (aged 89–90); Istanbul, Turkey
- Military career
- Allegiance: Ottoman Empire; Turkey
- Service years: Ottoman Empire: 1892–1921; Turkey: August 30, 1921 – November 1, 1931
- Rank: Major general
- Commands: 36th Regiment, 4th Division, 54th Division, 41st Division; 11th Division, 18th Division, President of the Infantry Shooting School, Inspector of the Infantry and Machin Guns, 4th Division, II Corps (deputy)
- Conflicts: Balkan Wars; First World War; Turkish War of Independence

Cemil Conk (1873 in Üsküdar – 1963 in Istanbul) was a decorated officer of the Ottoman Army and a general of the Turkish Army. He received the surname Conk from Conk Bayırı, where he successfully fought at the Battle of Chunuk Bair (Conk Bayırı in Turkish) during the Gallipoli campaign in World War I. After the war, he participated in the Turkish War of Independence where he fought against the Greeks on the western front.

== Works ==
- Cemil Conk, Hatıraları: Balkan Harbi 1912–1913. [Çanakkale Seferi 1915], Türkiye Yayınevi, 1947.
- Cemil Conk, Çanakkale Conkbayırı Savaşları, Erkânıharbiyei Umumiye Basımevi, 1959.

== Medals and decorations ==
- Order of the Medjidie 3rd Class
- Silver Medal of Liyakat
- Gallipoli Star (Ottoman Empire)
- Silver Medal of Imtiyaz
- Medal of Independence with Red Ribbon

== See also ==
- List of high-ranking commanders of the Turkish War of Independence
