= Mehmet Emin Yazgan =

Turkish soldier

Mehmet Emin Yazgan 1311-P. 88
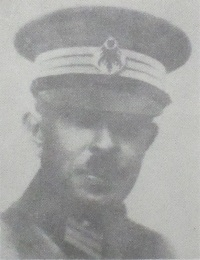
- Born: 1876; Constantinople (Istanbul), Ottoman Empire
- Died: February 21, 1961 (aged 84–85); Istanbul, Turkey
- Military career
- Allegiance: Ottoman Empire; Turkey
- Service years: Ottoman: 1895–1920; Turkey: 1920–October 8, 1930
- Rank: Mirliva
- Commands: 16th Regiment, 6th Division, Inspector of the Depot Forces of the Sixth Army, 109th Regiment, İzmir Military Court; 143rd Regiment, 2nd Regiment, Ankara Military Service Department, Sakarya Area of Kocaeli Group, İzmit Area, Infantry Brigade of the 7th Division, 18th Division, Inspector of Çorum Area, member of the Ankara Military Court, Infantry Brigade of the 8th Division, Istanbul Central Command
- Conflicts: Greco-Turkish War; Italo-Turkish War; Balkan Wars; First World War; Turkish War of Independence

Mehmet Emin Yazgan (1876 in Constantinople (Istanbul) – February 21, 1961 in Istanbul) was an officer of the Ottoman Army and a general of the Turkish Army.

He entered the Military Academy on May 13, 1892, and graduated with the rank of lieutenant on March 13, 1895.

== See also ==
- List of high-ranking commanders of the Turkish War of Independence
