= Mehmet Emin Çolakoğlu =

Turkish general (1878–1939)

Mehmet Emin Çolakoğlu 1314-Top. 4
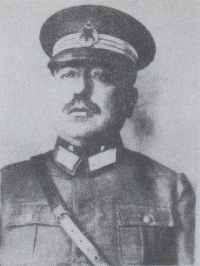
- Born: 1878; Kara Hisar-ı Şarki (Şebinkarahisar), Ottoman Empire
- Died: 6 August 1939 (aged 60–61)
- Military career
- Allegiance: Ottoman Empire; Turkey
- Service years: Ottoman Empire: 1897–1921; Turkey: 1921–1938
- Rank: Mirliva
- Commands: 13th Artillery Regiment, Artillery Command of the II Corps, Inspector of Artillery of the Third Army, Field Artillery School; Artillery Command of the Eastern Front, Kars Fortified Area Command, Erzurum Fortified Area Command, Kars Fortified Area Command, 9th Caucasian Division (deputy), Inspector of Artillery, General Director of the Science and Art
- Conflicts: Balkan Wars; First World War; Turkish War of Independence

Mehmet Emin Çolakoğlu (1878 – 6 August 1939) was an officer of the Ottoman Army and a general of the Turkish Army.

== See also ==
- List of high-ranking commanders of the Turkish War of Independence
