= Süleyman Sabri Pasha =

Turkish soldier

Süleyman Sabri Pasha 1311-b-Sv. 50
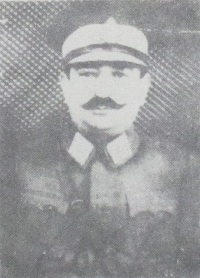
- Born: 1873; Monastir (Bitola), Ottoman Empire (modern North Macedonia)
- Died: November 3, 1941 (aged 67–68)
- Military career
- Allegiance: Ottoman Empire; Turkey
- Service years: Ottoman: 1885–1919; Turkey: 1919 – August 31, 1930
- Rank: Mirliva
- Commands: Nasiriyah, Baghdad, Iraq Cavalry Brigade, Iraq General Tribal Forces, Musul, 8th Regiment of the 3rd Cavalry Division, Istanbul Martial Court, Cavalry Regiment of the XIV Corps; Akhisar Area, Yenişehir and İnegöl Area, 61st Division (deputy), Ulukışla-Sivas-Kayseri Line, 7th Tribal Cavalry Division, 8th Reserve Tribal Cavalry Division, Revandiz-Van Area Command, Iran Border Commissar, Vice Governor of Van Vilayet, Başkale Group (Nestorian Operation), Chief justice of the I Corps, Brigade of the 14th Cavalry Division
- Conflicts: Greco-Turkish War; Italo-Turkish War; Balkan Wars; First World War; Turkish War of Independence

Süleyman Sabri Pasha (1873 in Monastir (Bitola) – November 3, 1941 in Istanbul) was an officer of the Ottoman Army and a general of the Turkish Army.

== Works ==
- Van Tarihi ve Kürt Türkleri Hakkında İnceleme

== Medals and decorations ==
- Order of the Medjidie 5th class
- Medal of the Battle against Greece
- Medal of Liyaqat
- Gallipoli Star (Ottoman Empire)
- Austria Hungary Order of Franz Joseph 3rd class
- Medal of Independence with Red Ribbon

== See also ==
- List of high-ranking commanders of the Turkish War of Independence
