= Yusuf Izzet Pasha =

Turkish general and politician

Yusuf Izzet Pasha 1312-Sv. 6
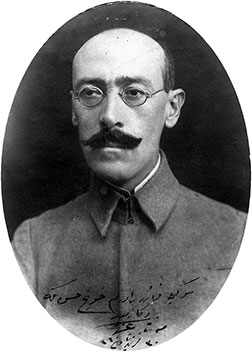
- Born: 1876; Yozgat, Ottoman Empire
- Died: 15 April 1922 (aged 45–46); Ankara, Turkey
- Burial place: State Cemetery
- Spouse: Hayriye Melek Hunç (m. 1919)
- Military career
- Allegiance: Ottoman Empire; Turkey
- Service years: Ottoman Empire: 1896-1921; Turkey: 1921-April 15, 1922
- Rank: Major general
- Commands: 2nd Cavalry Division, X Corps, I Caucasian Corps, XIV Corps, Northern Caucasus Command; Reserve Group of the Western Front, 3rd Group
- Conflicts: Greco-Turkish War; Italo-Turkish War; Balkan Wars; First World War; Turkish War of Independence
- Other work: Member of the GNAT (Bolu)

Yusuf Izzet Pasha (Adyghe: Юсыф-Изэт Пащэ, romanized: Yusıf-İzət Paşə; 1876 in Yozgat – April 15, 1922, in Ankara) was an Ottoman general of Circassian origin, who served both the Ottoman Army and the Turkish Army.

== See also ==
- List of high-ranking commanders of the Turkish War of Independence
