= Ethem Necdet Karabudak =

Ethem Necdet Karabudak 1318-P. 31
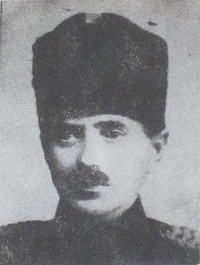
- Born: 1882; Çal, Ottoman Empire
- Died: 13 July 1946 (aged 63–64); Denizli
- Burial place: Bakırköy Mezarlığı
- Military career
- Allegiance: Ottoman Empire; Turkey
- Service years: Ottoman: 1902–1919; Turkey,: November 18, 1919 – January 28, 1925
- Rank: Miralay
- Commands: 153rd Regiment (deputy), 155th Regiment (deputy); 14th Division
- Conflicts: Balkan Wars; First World War; Turkish War of Independence

Ethem Necdet Karabudak (1882 in Çal – July 13, 1946 in Denizli) was an officer of the Ottoman Army and of the Turkish Army.

== Medals and decorations ==
- Gallipoli Star (Ottoman Empire)
- Silver Medal of Liyakat
- Medal of Independence with Red Ribbon and Citation

== See also ==
- List of high-ranking commanders of the Turkish War of Independence
