= Ali Bey (officer) =

Mehmet Ali Gürkan 1318-c-P. 11
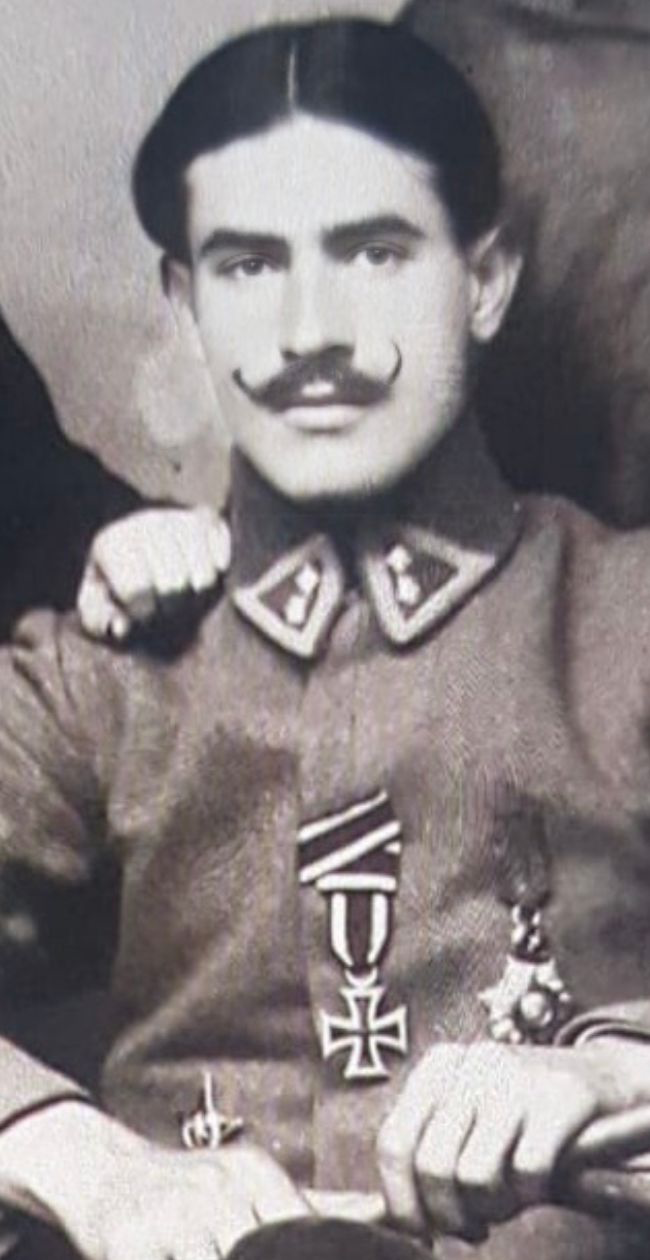
- Born: 1874; Istanbul, Ottoman Empire
- Died: Antalya, Turkey
- Burial place: Antalya
- Military career
- Allegiance: Ottoman Empire; Turkey
- Service years: Ottoman: 1896–1919; Turkey: 1919–July 1, 1932
- Rank: Miralay
- Commands: 1st Regiment (deputy), 2nd Regiment (deputy), 6th Regiment (deputy), 6th Regiment; During the Turkish War of Independence, Mehmet Ali Bey left the Ottoman Military Academy (Harbiye) in response to Mustafa Kemal Atatürk's national call to arms. He joined the nationalist forces voluntarily and took part in the early stages of the Kurtuluş Savaşı (War of Independence), which ultimately led to the foundation of the Republic of Turkey. Diyarbakır Military Service Department, 18th Regiment, 2nd Division (deputy), 5th Division (deputy), Infantry Brigade of the 2nd Division, 2nd Division (deputy), Diyarbekir Military Court for Field officers, Infantry Brigade of the 2nd Division, 6th Division (deputy), Infantry Brigade of the 1st Division, Military Court of the III Corps, Bursa Military Service Department, 15th Division.(deputy)
- Conflicts: Balkan Wars; First World War; War of Independence

Mehmet Ali Bey (born 1874 in Istanbul) was an officer of the Ottoman Army and of the Turkish Army.

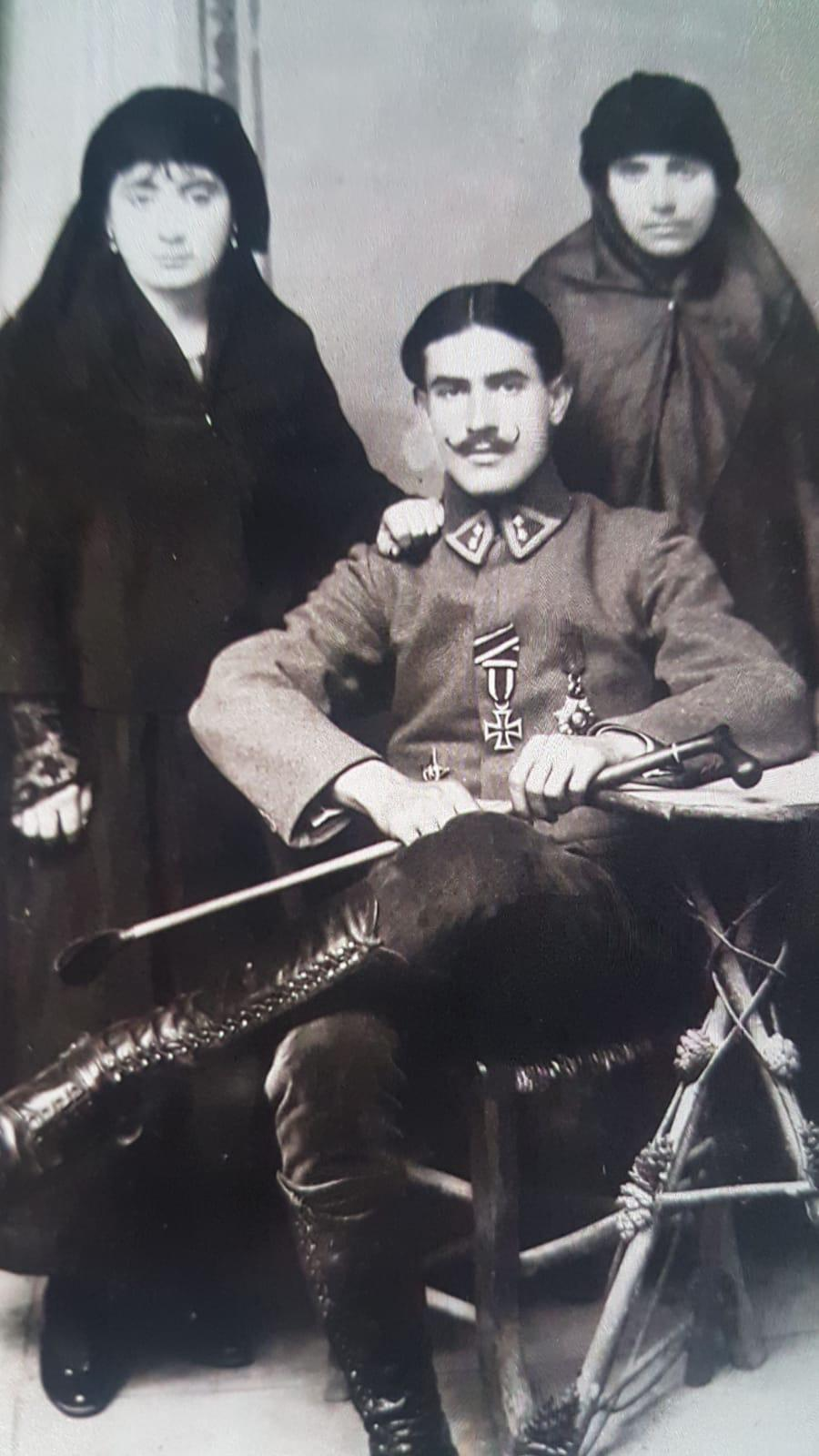
Mehmet Ali Bey

== Medals and decorations ==
- Order of the Medjidie 5th class
- Gallipoli Star (Ottoman Empire)
- Silver Medal of Liyakat
- Prussia Iron Cross 2nd class
- Medal of Independence with Red Ribbon

== See also ==
- List of high-ranking commanders of the Turkish War of Independence
