= Ahmet Nuri Öztekin =

Officer of the Ottoman Army and Turkish Army

Mehmet Nuri Öztekin 1315-P. 26
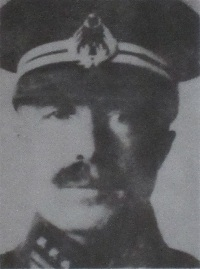
- Born: 1876; Bandırma, Hüdavendigâr Vilayet, Ottoman Empire
- Died: 1951?
- Burial place: State Cemetery
- Military career
- Allegiance: Ottoman Empire; Turkey
- Service years: Ottoman: January 1900–1915; Turkey: August 25, 1920 – April 12, 1928
- Rank: Miralay
- Commands: 3rd division of the headquarters of the Third Army; 3rd Caucasian Division, Yozgat Military Service Department, Tokat Military Service Department
- Conflicts: Italo-Turkish War; Balkan Wars; First World War; Turkish War of Independence

Ahmet Nuri Öztekin (1876; Bandırma – ?; ?) was an officer of the Ottoman Army and the Turkish Army.

== Medals and decorations ==
- Medal of Independence with Red Ribbon

== See also ==
- List of high-ranking commanders of the Turkish War of Independence
- Mustafa Suphi
