= Hüseyin Hüsnü Emir Erkilet =

Turkish general (1883–1954)

Hüseyin Hüsnü Emir Erkilet 1320-P. 5
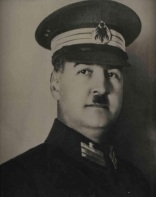
- Born: 12 March 1883; Istanbul, Ottoman Empire
- Died: 2 April 1958 (aged 75); Ankara, Turkey
- Burial place: Ankara Asrî Mezarlığı
- Military career
- Allegiance: Ottoman Empire; Turkey
- Service years: Ottoman: 1904–1921; Turkey: September 15, 1921–1932
- Rank: Mirliva
- Commands: Delegation to the Army Group Mackensen, Chief of Staff of the XIV Corps, Deputy Chief of Staff of the Yıldırım Army Group, Chief of Staff of the Fourth Army, Chief of Staff of the Eighth Army, 46th Division, Chief of Staff of the Ninth Army, Chief of Staff of the Second Army, 3rd division of the General Staff, Chief of the Council of Military History, Military attaché to Bern; 7th Division, Chief of Staff of the Second Army, 1st Division, Chief of the Operations Division of the General Staff, 7th Division, Izmir Fortified Area Command
- Conflicts: Balkan Wars; First World War; Turkish War of Independence

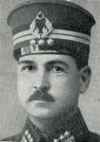
Hüseyin Hüsnü Emir Erkilet Pasha

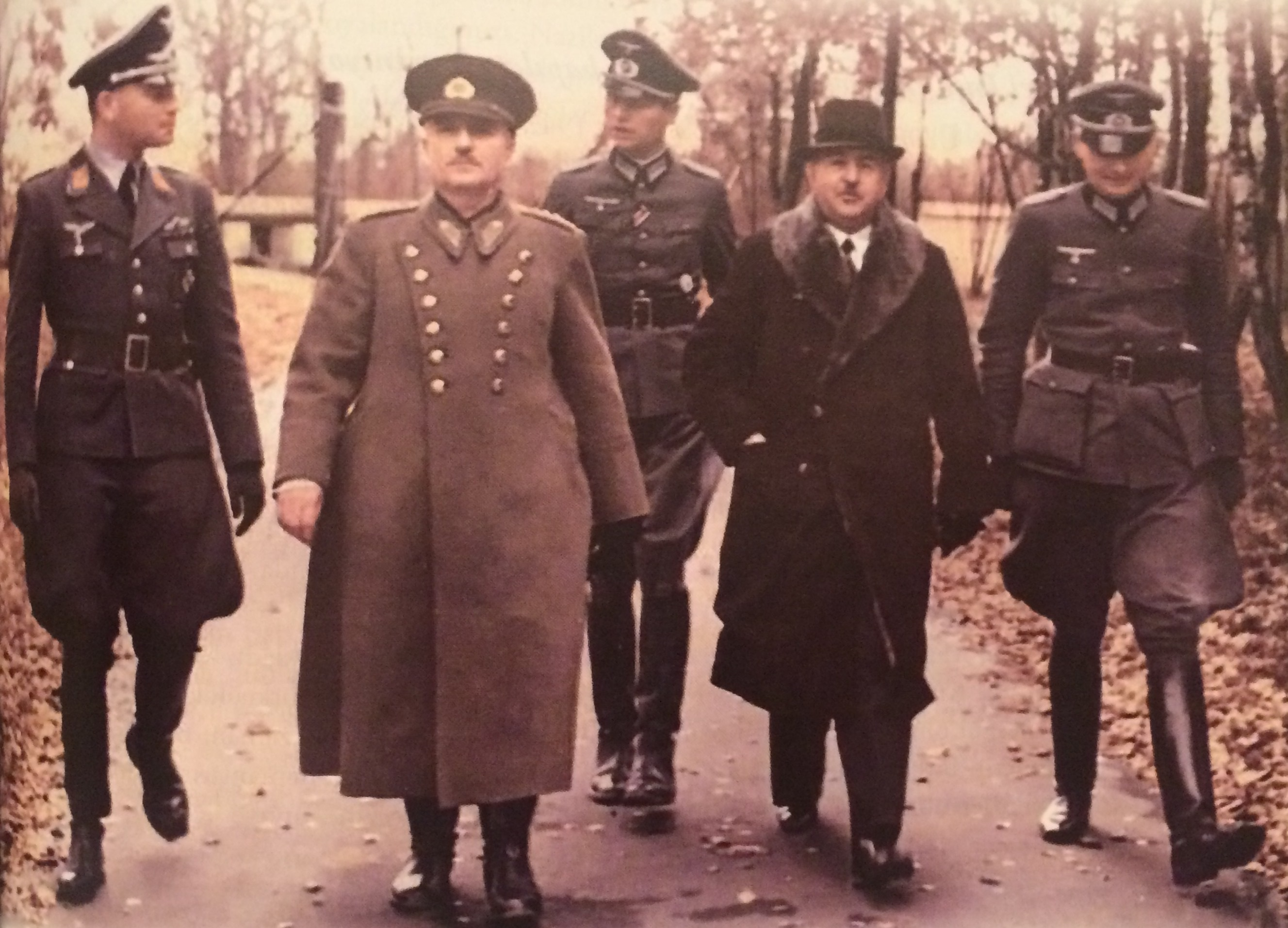
Hüseyin Hüsnü Emir Erkilet, a Retired Officer of the Turkish Army, and Ali Fuad Erden, the Chancellor of the Turkish Military Academy, are with 3 German Officers on the Eastern Front. October 31, 1941

Hüseyin Hüsnü Emir Erkilet (12 March 1883 – 2 April 1958) was an officer of the Ottoman Army and a general of the Turkish Army.

In the fall 1941 he, along with General Ali Fuad Erden, visited the occupied territories in Ukraine (including Crimea) on invitation of Gerd von Rundstedt. From there he and other Turkish officers flew to Rastenburg to meet Hitler in person. In 1943 he published his essays on that trip under title "What I Saw on the Eastern Front."

Being a staunch Turanist, he was briefly detained for Pan-Turkic activities in 1948 together with some other prominent Turanists.

== Works ==
- Yıldırım, İstanbul, 1921.
- Büyük Harpte Tank Muharebesi
- Seferî Karargâhlarda Kurmay Görevleri, İstanbul, 1921.
- Erkan-ı Harbiyye Meslek, Vezaif ve Teşkilatı, Tarihi ve İlmî Tetkikat, İstanbul, 1924.
- Dağda Harp Hareketleri hakkında bir Tetkik, İstanbul 1926. (Maurice Abadie)
- H. H. Emir Erkilet Paşa.'nın Avrupa'da tetkik seyahatlerine ait rapora zeyl, Ankara, 1927.
- Harp Albümü, İstanbul Cumhuriyet Basımevi.
- Şark Cephesinde Gördüklerim, Hilmi Kitabevi, İstanbul, 1943.
- 2. Cihan Harbi ve Türkiye, Giriş: Harbin Avrupa'da Doğurduğu Pürüzlü Meseleler, İnkılâp Kitabevi, İstanbul, 1945.

== See also ==
- List of high-ranking commanders of the Turkish War of Independence
