= Sadullah Güney =

Sadullah Güney 1318-Kale Top. 1
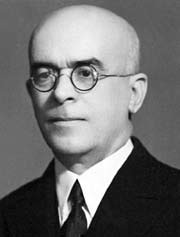
- Born: 1883; Galata, Constantinople (Istanbul), Ottoman Empire
- Died: 18 June 1945 (aged 61–62) ?, Turkey
- Burial place: Ankakra Cebeci Asrî Mezarlığı
- Military career
- Allegiance: Ottoman Empire; Turkey
- Service years: Ottoman: 1902–September 23, 1918; Turkey: July 6, 1921 – October 21, 1928
- Rank: Miralay
- Commands: Chief of Staff of the VIII Corps, Inspector of the Rear Area of the Fourth Army, Chief of Staff of the Inspectorate of the Rear Area, Chief of Staff of the Eighth Army, Central division of General headquarters, General Director of Seyri Sefain, 2nd division of the General Staff, member of the Ottoman delegation on the Armistice of Mudros; 16th Division, Inspector of the Rear Area of the Western Front, General Directorate of Shipping and Transportation, Deputy undersecretary of the Ministry of National Defense
- Conflicts: Italo-Turkish War; Balkan Wars; First World War; Turkish War of Independence
- Other work: General Director of the Seyr-i Sefain

Sadullah Güney also known as Ali Sadullah Bey (Galata, 1883 – June 18, 1945) was an officer of the Ottoman Army and the Turkish Army. He was also the General Director of the Seyr-i Sefain (January 6, 1923 – July 1, 1933).

== Medals and decorations ==
- Order of the Medjidie 4th and 3rd class
- Order of Osmanieh 4th
- Gallipoli Star (Ottoman Empire)
- Silver Medal of Liyakat
- Silver Medal of Imtiyaz
- Prussia Iron Cross 2nd class
- Austria-Hungary Military Merit Medal (Austria-Hungary) 3rd
- Austria-Hungary Order of the Iron Crown (Austria) 3rd
- Medal of Independence with Red Ribbon

== See also ==
- List of high-ranking commanders of the Turkish War of Independence
- Armistice of Mudros
