= Kâzım Kıvılcım =

Turkish army brigadier

Ahmed Kazım Kıvılcım (1876 in Kemah, Ottoman Empire – May 6, 1951 in Istanbul) was a Turkish Brigadier General of the Army (Türk Kara Kuvvetleri).

Kıvılcım completed his training as an officer at the Army School (Kara Harp Okulu) after completing school, which he completed in 1895 as a lieutenant (Teğmen). He then found use in infantry units and completed training at the Army Academy (Kara Harp Akademisi) in 1898, which he completed as Chief of Staff (Kurmay Yüzbaşı). Subsequently, he was deployed in numerous units of the army.

After the War of Liberation, he was promoted to Brigadier General (Tuğgeneral) in 1924 and initially commanded the 9th Division before becoming Head of the Directorate General for Cartography (Harita Genel Müdürlüğü) on July 26, 1926 and held this post until September 2, 1928. He was then a member of the Supreme Military Appeal Court (Yüksek Askerî Temyiz) and later commander of the 23rd division. On September 28, 1931 he was put into early retirement at his own request.

Nicknamed Kivilcim - Lightning, by Atatürk due to the speed of passing messages.

After his death, Kıvılcım was buried in the Edirnekapı Cemetery (Edirnekapı Mezarlığı) of Istanbul.
