= Mehmet Nâzım Bey =

Turkish officer (1886–1921)

Mehmet Nâzım Bey 1323-P. 3
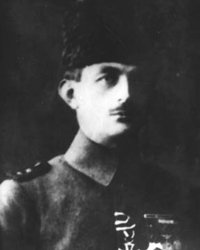
- Born: 1886; Kayseri, Ankara Eyalet, Ottoman Empire
- Died: 15 July 1921 (aged 34–35); Yumruçal, Turkey
- Burial place: Ankara Şehitliği; State Cemetery
- Military career
- Allegiance: Ottoman Empire; Turkey
- Service years: Ottoman: 1899–1919; Turkey: 1919–July 15, 1921
- Rank: Miralay
- Commands: Chief of Staff of the 16th Division, Chief of Staff of the 19th Division, Delegation to the Army Group Mackensen, Rumelia Detachment, 7th Cavalry Regiment; Provisional Division, 4th Division
- Conflicts: Italo-Turkish War; Balkan Wars; First World War; Turkish War of Independence †

Mehmet Nâzım Bey (1886; Kayseri - July 15, 1921; Yumruçal) was an officer of the Ottoman Army and the Turkish Army. He is credited with his defense of the Gallipoli peninsula during the Gallipoli campaign of World War I.

He was killed in action against the Greek Army on July 15, 1921 during the Battle of Yumruçal in the Turkish War of Independence (see Battle of Afyonkarahisar–Eskişehir).

== See also ==
- List of high-ranking commanders of the Turkish War of Independence
- Battle of Afyonkarahisar–Eskişehir
