= Nihat Anılmış =

Turkish politician

Nihat Anılmış 1312-P. 4
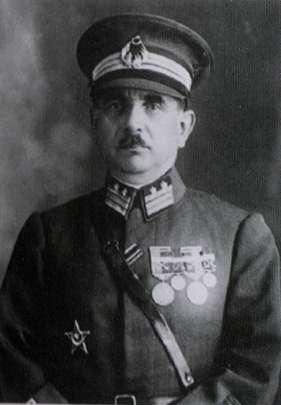
- Born: 1876; Filibe (Plovdiv), Ottoman Empire
- Died: May 31, 1954 (aged 77–78); Istanbul, Turkey
- Burial place: Zincirlikuyu Mezarlığı; State Cemetery
- Military career
- Allegiance: Ottoman Empire; Turkey
- Service years: Ottoman Empire: 1896–1920; Turkey: June 1920 – May 1942
- Rank: General
- Commands: Chief of Staff of the Second Army, Dardanelles Fortified Area Command, Gallipoli Southern Group, Second Army, Seventh Army (deputy), Second Army, Adana Area Command; El-Cezire Front, president of the Military Supreme Court
- Conflicts: Balkan Wars; First World War; War of Independence
- Other work: Member of the GNAT (Ankara)

Nihat Anılmış (1876 in Filibe (Plovdiv) – May 31, 1954 in Istanbul), also known as Nihad Pasha, was an officer of the Ottoman Army and a general of the Turkish Army.

He served as an officer in the 1st Branch of the General Staff, an officer in the 4th Army, a natural science instructor at the Monastir War School, commander of the 2nd Regular Battalion of the 10th Regiment of the 2nd Army, director of the Imperial Imperial Staff, an officer in the 2nd Branch of the General Supplies Department, range inspector at the Commander-in-Chief Headquarters, commander of the Bahr-i Sefid Fortified Area, commander of the 2nd Army, commander of the 14th Corps, president of the Military Court of Appeals, and as a member of parliament for Ankara in the 6th term (by-elections) and 7th terms of the TBMM. He was awarded the 4th and 3rd Class Medal, the 2nd Class Ottoman Medal, the War Medal, the Silver War Medal, the Gold Medal, the German Iron Cross, the Independence Medal and Certificate of Appreciation.

He was married and had two children. His remains were transferred to the Turkish State Cemetery in 1988.

== See also ==
- List of high-ranking commanders of the Turkish War of Independence
