= Selâhattin Âdil =

Turkish military officer

Selâhattin Âdil 1315-b-Top 2
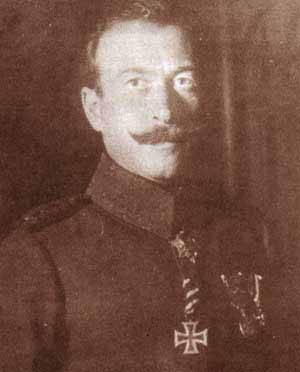
- Born: January 19, 1882; Constantinople (Istanbul), Ottoman Empire
- Died: February 27, 1961 (aged 80); Istanbul, Turkey
- Burial place: Zincirlikuyu Mezarlığı; State Cemetery
- Military career
- Allegiance: Ottoman Empire; Turkey
- Service years: Ottoman Empire: 1900–1920; Turkey: June 1920 – September 29, 1923
- Rank: Major general
- Commands: Chief of Staff of the Dardanelles Fortified Area Command, 12th Division, 13th Division, XI Corps, XIX Corps, XVII Corps, Dardanelles Fortified Area Command, XVII Corps, General Directorate of Military Manufacturing; II Corps, Undersecretary of the Ministry of National Defense, Istanbul Command
- Conflicts: Italo-Turkish War; Balkan Wars; First World War; Turkish War of Independence
- Other work: Governor of the Adana Province; Member of the GNAT (Ankara)

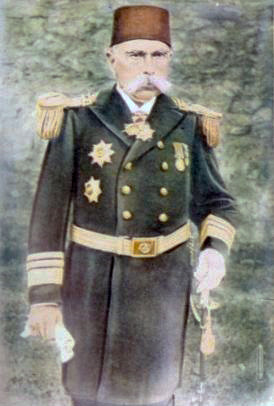
Selâhattin Âdil was the son of Âdil Pasha, an admiral in the Imperial Ottoman Navy

Selâhattin Âdil (January 19, 1882; Constantinople (Istanbul) – February 27, 1961; Istanbul) was an officer of the Ottoman Army and a general of the Turkish Army. He fought in the Gallipoli Campaign during the First World War, where he first organized the defence of the Dardanelles forts and later led a division in battle. He led a Turkish army corps during the Turkish War of Independence, where he fought first against the French occupation of Cilicia and later in the 1921 Battle of Sakarya. However, he resigned in 1923 because of disagreements with the abolition of the Ottoman Caliphate. In the 1950s, he joined the Democrat Party led by Adnan Menderes. He retired in 1953 after developing differences with the party.

== Works ==
- Selahattin Adil (ed. Enver Koray), Hayat Mücadeleleri- Selahattin Adil Paşa'nın Hatıraları, Zafer Matbaası, 1982.

== See also ==
- List of high-ranking commanders of the Turkish War of Independence
