= Halit Akmansü =

Turkish politician

Halit Akmansü 1322-Top. 2
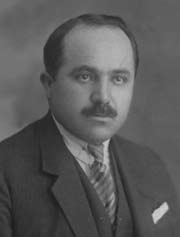
- Dadaylı Halit Bey (Akmansü)
- Born: 1883; Daday, Kastamonu Vilayet, Ottoman Empire
- Died: 10 February 1953 (aged 69–70); Istanbul, Turkey
- Burial place: State Cemetery
- Military career
- Allegiance: Ottoman Empire; Turkey
- Service years: Ottoman: 1906–1920; Turkey: 1920–January 16, 1929
- Rank: Brigadier
- Commands: Staff of the Iraq Area Command, Staff of the 52nd Division, 1st division of the Sixth Army, Chief of Staff of the XVIII Corps, Chief of Staff of the XXIV Corps; Maraş Area Command, Department of Transportation of National Defense, 3rd Caucasian Division, 5th Caucasian Division
- Conflicts: Balkan Wars; First World War; Turkish War of Independence
- Other work: Member of the GNAT (Kastamonu)

Halit Akmansü (1883; Daday, Kastamonu Vilayet – 10 February 1953; Istanbul), also known as Dadayli Halit Bey, was an officer of the Ottoman Army and the Turkish Army.

== Medals and decorations ==
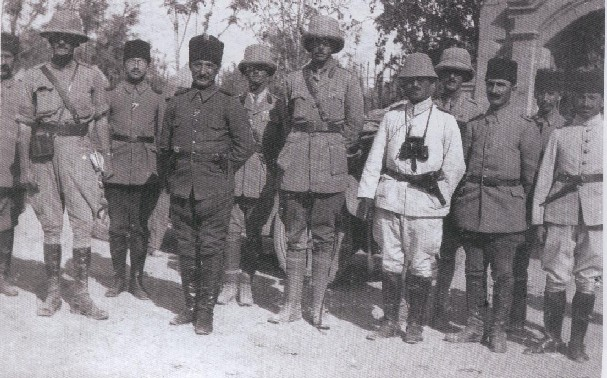
Ali İhsan pasha, Dadaylı Halit Bey and the British soldiers, November 1918.

- Gallipoli Star
- Nichan Iftikhar
- Silver Medal of Liyakat
- Silver Medal of Imtiyaz
- Prussia Iron Cross 1st and 2nd class
- Medal of Independence with Red Ribbon

== See also ==
- List of high-ranking commanders of the Turkish War of Independence
