= Asım Gündüz =

Deputy Chief of the General Staff of Turkish Armed Forces

Âsım Gündüz 1316-P. 2
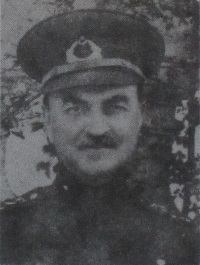
- Born: 1 December 1880; Kütahya, Ottoman Empire
- Died: 14 January 1970 (aged 89); Istanbul, Turkey
- Burial place: Zincirlikuyu Cemetery
- Military career
- Allegiance: Ottoman Empire; Turkey
- Service years: Ottoman: 1901–1920; Turkey: August 3, 1921 – August 3, 1945
- Rank: Orgeneral
- Commands: Chief of Staff of the III Corps, Chief of Staff of the Sinai Front, Vice Chief of Staff of the Eighth Army, 48th Division, teacher of tactics in the Staff College, teacher of princes, 2nd division of the General Staff; Chief of Staff of the Western Front, Deputy Chief of the General Staff, VIII Corps, IX Corps, V Corps, member of the Military Supreme Council
- Conflicts: Balkan Wars; First World War; Turkish War of Independence
- Other work: Member of the GNAT (Kütahya)

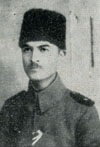
Âsım Gündüz Pasha during his time in the Ottoman Army

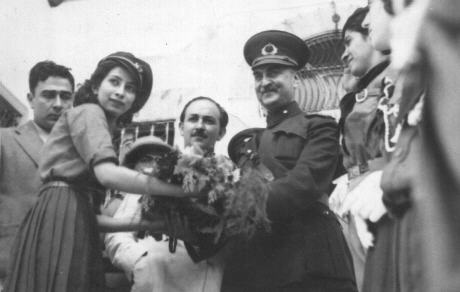
Âsım Gündüz in Antakya, Hatay Province

Âsım Gündüz (1 December 1880 – 14 January 1970) was an officer of the Ottoman Army and a general of the Turkish Army.

During the Second World War, he was the assistant of Chief of the General Staff Fevzi Çakmak.

== See also ==
- List of high-ranking commanders of the Turkish War of Independence
