= Talat Avni Özüdoğru =

Turkish politician

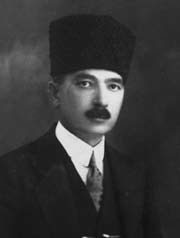
- Born: 1880; Samsun, Ottoman Empire
- Died: 13 August 1939 (aged 58–59); Samsun, Turkey
- Military career
- Allegiance: Ottoman Empire; Turkey
- Service years: Ottoman: 1902–
- Rank: Binbaşı
- Conflicts: Italo-Turkish War; Balkan Wars
- Other work: Member of the GNAT (Canik)

Talat Avni Özüdoğru (1880 in Samsun – August 13, 1939 in Samsun) was a military officer of the Ottoman Army, a politician of the Ottoman Empire and the Republic of Turkey. He was an elder brother of Şefik Avni (Özüdoğru).
