= Seyfi Düzgören =

Turkish general (1880–1948)

Seyfi Düzgören 1318-P. 14
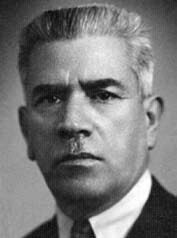
- Born: Şevket Seyfi Düzgören; 1880; Constantinople (Istanbul), Ottoman Empire
- Died: 28 December 1948 (aged 67–68); Ankara, Turkey
- Burial place: Ankara Şehitliği
- Military career
- Allegiance: Ottoman Empire; Turkey
- Service years: Ottoman: 1902–1920; Turkey: March 1920–20 February 1923
- Rank: Mirliva
- Commands: Chief of Staff of the 1st Division, Division of the Intelligence of the General headquarters 3rd Caucasian Division (deputy), 13th Caucasian Division, Chief of Staff of the Eastern Front, Army Division of the Ministry of National Defense, 23rd Division, 57th Division, Undersecretary of the Ministry of National Defense, Customs Guard
- Conflicts: Italo-Turkish War; Balkan Wars; First World War; Turkish War of Independence
- Other work: Member of the GNAT (Mardin)

Seyfi Düzgören (1880 – 28 December 1948) was an officer of the Ottoman Army and a general of the Turkish Army.

== See also ==
- List of high-ranking commanders of the Turkish War of Independence
