= Şefik Avni Özüdoğru =

Şefik Avni Özdoğru 1319-İs. 1
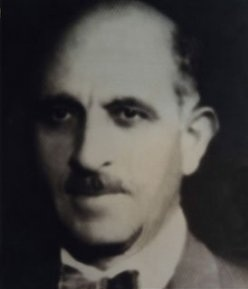
- Born: 1884; Samsun, Ottoman Empire
- Died: 3 July 1960 (aged 75–76); Samsun, Turkey
- Military career
- Allegiance: Ottoman Empire; Turkey
- Service years: Ottoman: 1903 – September 23, 1918; Turkey: May 1920 – February 29, 1921
- Rank: Kaymakam
- Commands: 1st division of the Third Army, 17th Division (deputy), Chief of Staff of the XV Corps, Chief of Staff of the XIV Corps, Chief of Staff of the IV Corps, Chief of Staff of the Sinai Front, Chief of Staff of the III Corps, Chief of Staff of the VIII Corps, 55th Division (deputy); 15th Division
- Conflicts: Italo-Turkish War; Balkan Wars; First World War; Turkish War of Independence
- Other work: Mayor of Samsun

Şefik Avni Özdoğru (1884 in Samsun – July 3, 1960 in Samsun) was an officer of the Ottoman Army and of the Turkish Army. Mayor of Samsun (March – June 1925). He was a younger brother of Talat Avni (Özüdoğru).

== Works ==
- Keşif
- Ağır Topçuların Eğitimi

== Medals and decorations ==
- Order of the Medjidie 4th class
- Prussia Iron Cross
- Austria-Hungary Military Merit Medal (Austria-Hungary)
- Austria-Hungary Order of the Iron Crown (Austria)
- Medal of Independence with Red Ribbon

== See also ==
- List of high-ranking commanders of the Turkish War of Independence
