= XIV Corps (Ottoman Empire) =

XIV Corps On Dördüncü Kolordu
- Active: 1911–
- Country: Ottoman Empire
- Type: Corps
- Garrison/HQ: Sana'a
- Patron: Ottoman Sultan

Commanders
- Notable commanders: Mirliva Trommer Pasha (April 4, 1915-); Mirliva Cevat Pasha (I: October 9-November 18, 1915 II: August 19-November 8, 1917); Mirliva Kâzım Karabekir Pasha (December 25, 1918-March 2, 1919)

The XIV Corps of the Ottoman Empire (Turkish: 14 ncü Kolordu or On Dördüncü Kolordu) was one of the corps of the Ottoman Army. It was formed in the early 20th century during Ottoman military reforms.

== Formation ==
=== Order of battle, 1911 ===
With further reorganizations of the Ottoman Army, to include the creation of corps level headquarters, by 1911 the XIV Corps was headquartered in Sana'a. The Corps before the First Balkan War in 1911 was structured as such:

- XIV Corps, Sana'a
  - 39th Infantry Division, Sana'a
    - 115th Infantry Regiment, Sana'a
    - 116th Infantry Regiment, Zimar
    - 117th Infantry Regiment, Umran, Zindiye, Shibam
    - 39th Rifle Battalion, Su'il Hamis
  - 40th Infantry Division, Hudeyde
    - 118th Infantry Regiment, Hudeyde
    - 119th Infantry Regiment, Taiz
    - 120th Infantry Regiment, Hicce
    - 40th Rifle Battalion, Sana'a
  - 41st Infantry Division, Ebha
    - 109th Infantry Regiment, Ebha
    - 110th Infantry Regiment, Ebha
    - 111th Infantry Regiment, Ebha
    - 28th Mountain Artillery Battalion, Ebha
- Units of XIV Corps
- 37th Cavalry Regiment, Sana'a
- 27th Mountain Artillery Battalion, vicinity of Sana'a
- 14th Engineer Battalion, Sana'a
- Regular Battalion, Tehame
- Engineer Company, Sinan Paşa

== World War I ==
=== Order of battle, December 1916 ===
In December 1916, the corps was structured as follows:

- XIV Corps (Gallipoli)
  - 57th Division, 59th Division

=== Order of battle, August 1917, January 1918, June 1918, September 1918 ===
In August 1917, January 1918, June 1918, September 1918, the corps was structured as follows:

- XIV Corps (Gallipoli)
  - 57th Division

== After Mudros ==
=== Order of battle, November 1918 ===
In November 1918, the corps was structured as follows:

- XIV Corps (Gallipoli)
  - 49th Division, 60th Division, 61st Division

=== Order of battle, January 1919 ===
In January 1919, the corps was structured as follows:

- XIV Corps (Thrace, Tekfurdağı; present day: Tekirdağ)
  - 55th Division (Tekfurdağı)
    - 168th Infantry Regiment, 170th Infantry Regiment, 171st Infantry Regiment
  - 61st Division (Bandırma)
    - 180th Infantry Regiment, 188th Infantry Regiment, 190th Infantry Regiment
