= Turkish Army order of battle in 1941 =

This is the order of battle of the Turkish Army in June 1941. The formation named 941-A Seferî Kuruluş was as follows:

Marshal Fevzi Çakmak, Chief of the General Staff

First Army (Istanbul, Commander: Fahrettin Altay)

- Thrace Area
  - 10th Corps (Kırklareli)
    - 46th Infantry Division
    - K.Gr.
  - 2nd Cavalry Division (elements reported at Lüleburgaz in 1935)
  - Independent Armored Brigade
  - 26th Infantry Brigade
  - Kırklareli Brigade
- Çatalca Area
  - 20th Corps (Cemil Cahit Toydemir)
    - 23rd Infantry Division
    - 24th Infantry Division
    - 33rd Infantry Division
    - 52nd Infantry Division
  - 4th Corps (Çatalca)
    - 8th Infantry Division
    - 22nd Infantry Division
    - 28th Infantry Division
    - 64th Infantry Division
  - Çatalca Fortified Area Command
  - 3rd Corps (Çorlu)
    - 1st Infantry Division
    - 61st Infantry Division
    - 46th Infantry Division
    - 62nd Infantry Division
- Istanbul and Bosporus Area
  - Istanbul Command
    - 11th Infantry Division
  - Bosporus Fortified Area Command

Second Army (Balıkesir, Commander: Abdurrahman Nafiz Gürman)

- Dardanelles and Marmara Area
  - 2nd Corps (Gelibolu)
    - 4th Infantry Division
    - 69th Infantry Division (after promotion to major-general, tr:Muzaffer Tuğsavul commanded this division for a period)
    - 32nd Infantry Division
    - 66th Infantry Division
    - 72nd Infantry Brigade
  - Demirkapı Fortified Area Command
  - 1st Corps (Çanakkale)
    - 16th Infantry Division
    - 57th Infantry Division
  - Dardanelles Fortified Area Command
  - 5th Corps (Bursa)
    - 5th Infantry Division (Turkey)
    - 6th Infantry Division (Turkey)
    - 25th Infantry Division
- Aegean and Mediterranean coasts
  - 12th Corps (İzmir) (1945 Gen. Nuri Berköz took command)
    - 70th Infantry Division
    - 71st Infantry Division
    - 63rd Infantry Division
  - İzmir Fortified Area Command
  - Antalya Brigade

Third Army (Erzincan, Commander: Kâzım Orbay)

- Eastern Area
  - 9th Corps (Sarıkamış)
    - 9th Infantry Division
    - 3rd Infantry Division
    - 29th Infantry Division
    - 1st Cavalry Division (Karaköse, now Ağrı (11th, 14th, 40th, 41st Cavalry Regiments) tr:Abdülkadir Seven commanded the division in 1944.tr:Saim Önhon seems to have been among the last commanders of the division.
  - Erzurum Fortified Area Command
  - 8th Corps (Merzifon)
    - 12th Infantry Division
    - 15th Infantry Division
  - 7th Corps (Diyarbakır)
    - 2nd Infantry Division
    - 10th Infantry Division
    - 53rd Infantry Division (Berköz was Commander, 53rd Border Div in Doğubayazıt during the war)
  - 18th Corps (Kars)
    - 48th Infantry Division
    - 51st Infantry Division - division headquarters seemingly being established at Dumlu north of Erzurum in 1944.
    - 67th Infantry Division
  - Kars Fortified Area Command

Under the direct control of the General Staff (Ankara, Fevzi Çakmak)

- Kocaeli Area
  - 6th Corps (Kocaeli)
    - 7th Infantry Division
    - 41st Infantry Division
    - 17th Infantry Division
- Syrian Border
  - 17th Corps (Maraş)
    - 20th Infantry Division
    - 39th Infantry Division
    - 14th Cavalry Division
    - 68th Infantry Brigade
