= First Army (Turkey) =

- Active: November 1921 – June 1923; October 1923–present
- Country: Turkey
- Size: 120,000 men Field Army
- Part of: Turkish Army
- Garrison/HQ: Selimiye, Istanbul
- Patron: Citizens of the Republic of Turkey

Commanders
- Current commander: General Ali Sivri
- Chief of Staff: Brigadier General Faruk Metin
- Notable commanders: Ali İhsan Pasha (1921–1922); Nureddin Pasha (1922–1923); Kâzım Karabekir Pasha (1923–1924); Ali Sait Pasha (1924–1933); Fahrettin Altay (1933–1943); Cemil Cahit Toydemir (1943–1946); Salih Omurtak (1946); Nuri Yamut (1946–1949)

The First Army of the Republic of Turkey (Turkish: 1'inci Ordu Komutanlığı) is one of the four field armies of the Turkish Army. Its headquarters is located at Selimiye Barracks in Istanbul. It guards the sensitive borders of Turkey with Greece and Bulgaria, including the straits Bosporus and Dardanelles. The First Army is stationed in East Thrace.

== History ==
Ali İhsan Sabis was the first commander of the 1st Army, which has been operating since the Ottoman Empire.

In April 1919, Şevket Turgut Pasha, Cevat Pasha and Kavaklı Mustafa Fevzi Pasha hold a secret meeting in Constantinople. They prepared a report called "Trio Oath" (Üçler Misâkı) and decided to establish army inspectorates to defend the homeland, in defiance of post-World War I Allied injunctions. In late April, Kavaklı Mustafa Fevzi Pasha submitted this report to the Minister of War Şakir Pasha. On April 30, 1919, the War Ministry and Sultan Mehmed VI ratified the Chief of General Staff's decision to establish army inspectorates. Therefore the First Army Troops Inspectorate (stationed in Constantinople, Kavaklı Mustafa Fevzi Pasha), the Yildirim Troops Inspectorate (at Konya) and the Ninth Army Troops Inspectorate (at Erzurum under Mustafa Kemal Pasha) were formed. In May 1919, the army inspectorate was structured as follows:

- First Army Troops Inspectorate (Birinci Ordu Kıt'aatı Müfettişliği, Constantinople, Inspector: Ferik Kavaklı Mustafa Fevzi Pasha)
  - I Corps (Adrianople, Miralay Cafer Tayyar Bey)
    - 49th Division
    - 60th Division
  - XIV Corps (Tekfurdağı, Mirliva Yusuf Izzet Pasha)
    - 55th Division
    - 61st Division
  - XVII Corps (Smyrna, Mirliva Ali Nadir Pasha, transferred to the Yildirim Army Troops Inspectorate after the Occupation of Smyrna)
    - 56th Division
    - 57th Division
  - XXV Corps (Constantinople, Mirliva Ali Sait Pasha)
    - 1st Division
    - 10th Caucasian Division

Today the army is responsible for the Thrace region, the Turkish Straits and the safety of Istanbul. Is commanded by a full general, wearing four stars. Under normal circumstances, the next position of the Commander of the First Army is the Turkish Chief of General Staff. From 1983 to the present day, it was the first place where all the chiefs of the general staff served.

== Formations ==
=== Order of Battle, 30 August 1922 ===
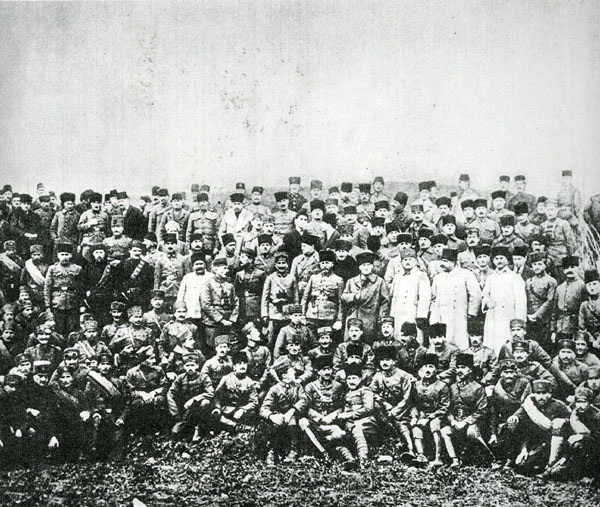
Turkish commanders visited the headquarters of the First Army, 18 January 1923. From left to right: Vehbi Bey (Kocagüney), Nurettin Pasha, Gazi Mustafa Kemal Pasha (Atatürk), Kâzım Karabekir Pasha, Mareşal Fevzi Pasha (Çakmak), Asım Bey (Gündüz).

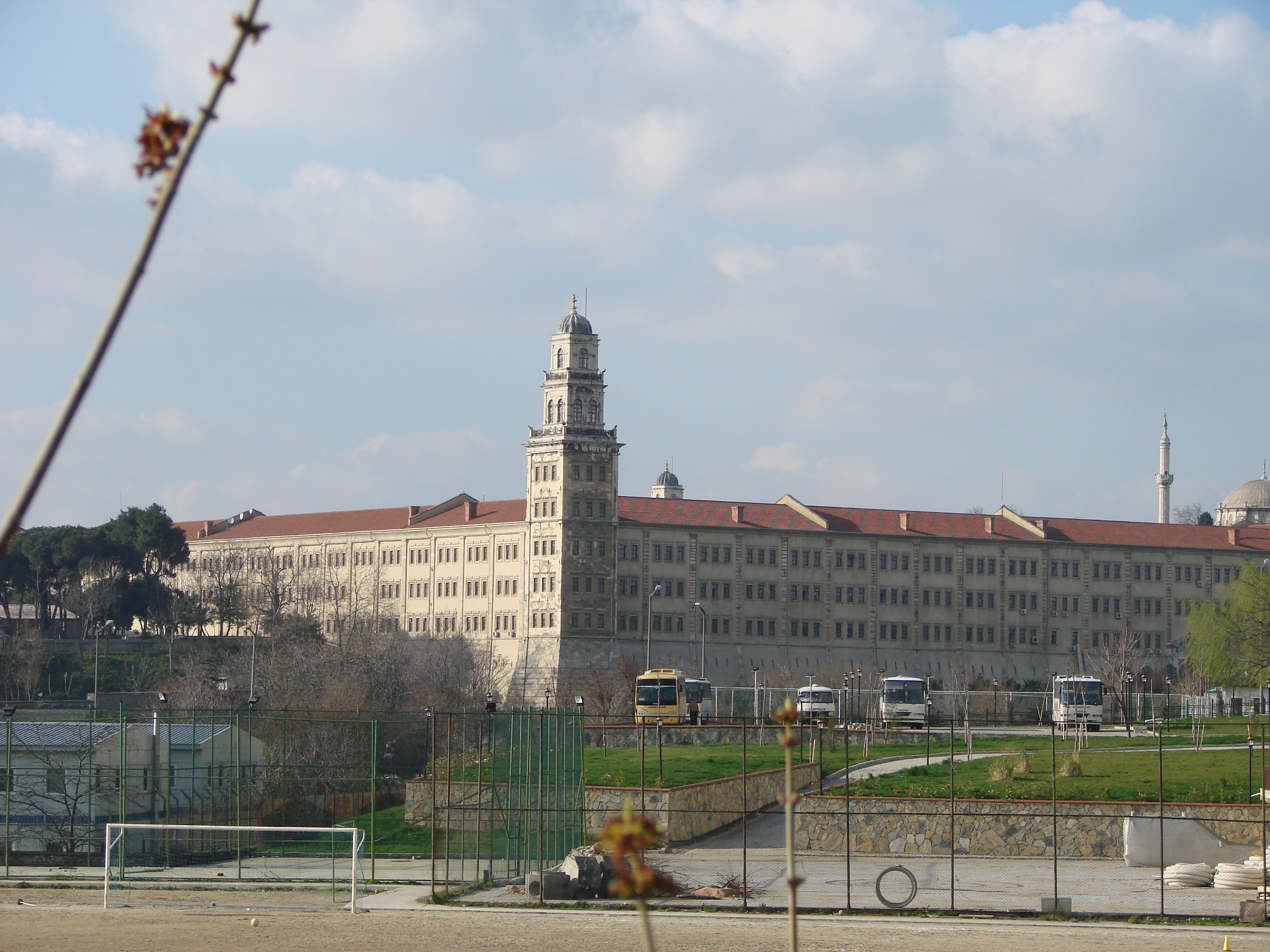
1st Army Command building

On 30 August 1922, the First Army was organized as follows:

First Army HQ (Commander: Mirliva Nureddin Pasha, Chief of Staff: Miralay Mehmet Emin Bey)

- Army reserve

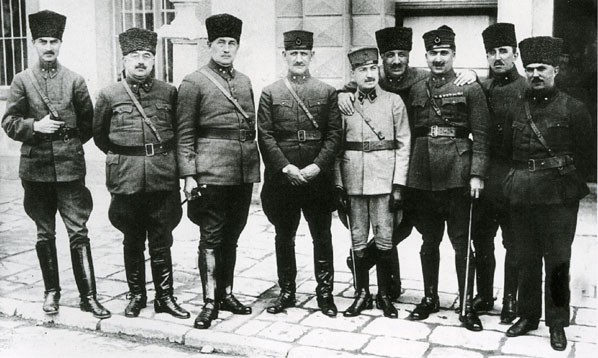
Commanders after the War of Independence: From left to right: Mirliva Âsım (Gündüz), Mirliva Ali Hikmet (Ayerdem), Ferik Ali Sait (Akbaytogan), Mirliva Şükrü Naili (Gökberk), Mirliva Kazım (İnanç), Ferik Fahrettin (Altay), Mirliva Kemalettin Sami (Gökçen), Mirliva Cafer Tayyar (Eğilmez), Mirliva İzzettin (Çalışlar)

  - 3rd Cavalry Division (İbrahim Bey)
  - 6th Infantry Division (Nazmi Bey)
- I Corps (İzzettin Bey)
  - 57th Infantry Division (Reşat Bey)
  - 14th Infantry Division (Ethem Necdet Bey)
  - 15th Infantry Division (Ahmet Naci Bey)
  - 23rd Infantry Division (Ömer Halis Bey)
- VI Corps (Kemalettin Sami Bey)
  - 11th Infantry Division (Ahmet Bey)
  - 12th Infantry Division (Osman Nuri Bey)
  - 5th Caucasian Infantry Division (Dadaylı Halit Bey)
  - 8th Infantry Division (Kâzım Bey)
- II Corps (Ali Hikmet Bey)
  - 7th Infantry Division (Ahmet Naci Bey)
  - 4th Infantry Division (Mehmet Sabri Bey)
  - 3rd Caucasian Infantry Division (Mehmet Kâzım Bey)
- V Cavalry Corps (Fahrettin Bey)
  - 1st Cavalry Division (Mürsel Bey)
  - 2nd Cavalry Division (Ahmet Zeki Bey)
  - 14th Cavalry Division (Mehmet Suphi Bey)

=== Order of Battle, 1941 ===
In June 1941, the First Army was organized as follows:

First Army HQ (Istanbul, Commander: Fahrettin Altay)

- Thrace Area
  - X Corps (Kırklareli)
- Çatalca Area
  - 20th Corps (General Cemil Cahit Toydemir)
    - 23rd, 24th, 33rd, 64th Divisions
  - 4th Corps (Çatalca)
    - 8th, 23rd, 28th, 52nd Divisions
  - Çatalca Fortified Area Command
  - 3rd Corps (Çorlu)
    - 1st, 46th, 61st, 62nd Divisions
- Istanbul and Bosporus Area
  - Istanbul Command
  - Bosporus Fortified Area Command

In 1958, the 15th Corps was stationed in Izmit, within the First Army area.

During the early stages of World War II, the 2nd Infantry Division (2. Piyade Tümeni) operated under the command of the 10th Corps in Thrace under the First Army. At a later point during the Cold War, the division relocated its headquarters to Çark Caddesi within Adapazarı. Future brigadier general Adnan Tanrıverdi was assigned to the division from 1978 to 1980, where he held the dual positions of Intelligence Branch Director (İstihbarat Şube Müdürlüğü) and Acting Chief of Staff (Kurmay Başkan Vekilliği). The division included the 20th Infantry Regiment (20. Piyade Alayı), which public judicial notices confirm was garrisoned out of the Taşkısığı base in Adapazarı. Following his promotion to Major General (Tümgeneral), tr:Atilla Ateş held the post of divisional commander from 1986 to 1988. The 2nd Infantry Division (Mechanized) remained at Adapazarı under the First Army in 1989. It appears that the division was reduced to a brigade in the 1990-93 period.

=== Order of Battle, late 1980s ===
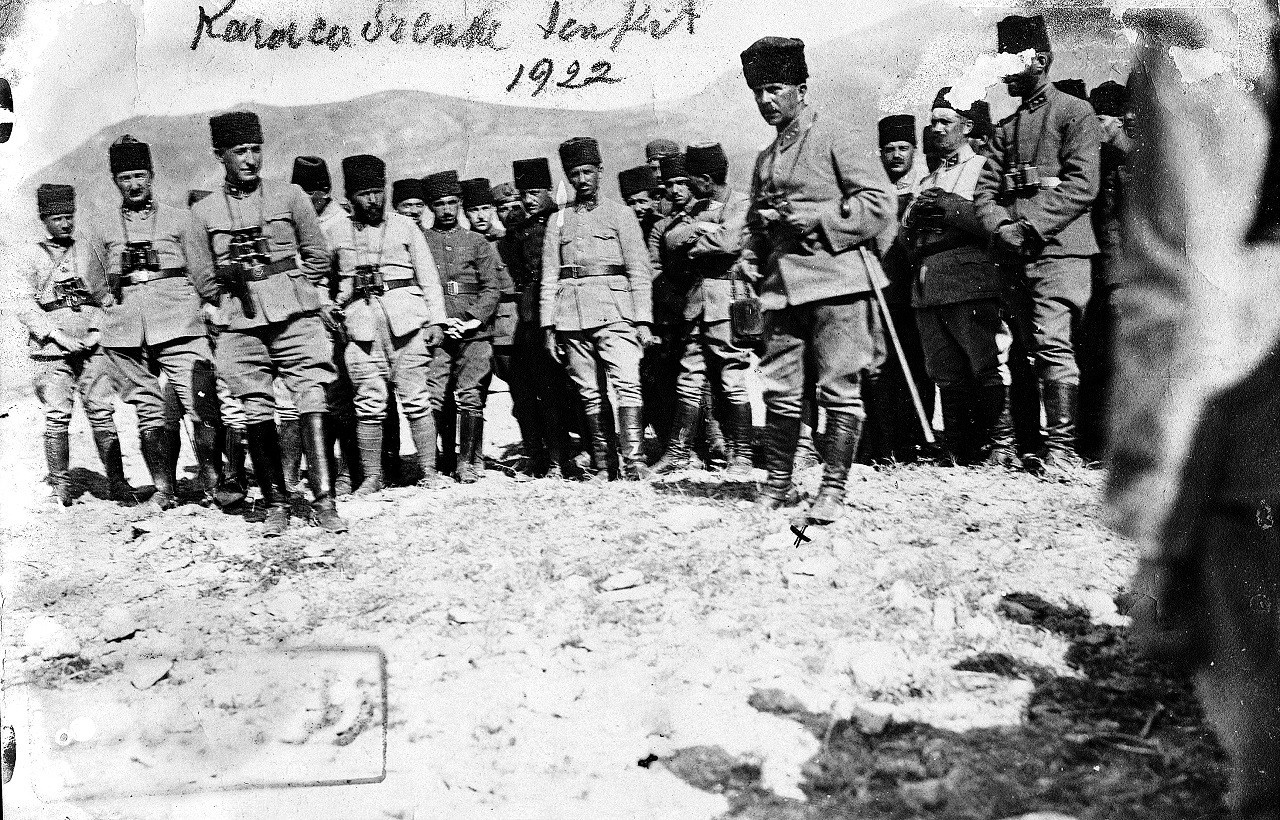
I Corps Commander Colonel İzzettin during military inspection in Afyon Karacaören in the Summer of 1922

In the late 1980s it comprised four corps:

- 2nd Corps (Gelibolu)
- 3rd Corps (Istanbul)
- 5th Corps (Çorlu)
- 15th Corps (Köseköy, İzmit)

=== Order of Battle, 2010 ===
As of November 2000, the 3rd Mechanized Infantry Division Command (3. Mekanize Piyade Tümen Komutanlığı) existed. Also reported during a ceremony in October 2005 at Edirne.

15th Army Corps was established on April 8, 1915 at the Kalvert Farm in Çanakkale and was first commanded by German Brigadier General Weber, achieving success in the Gallipoli Campaign. A total of 49 commanders, two of whom were colonels and 47 generals, served in the Corps from 1915 to 2005, which was deployed in Izmit in 1958. Lieutenant General Zafer Özkan, the last commander of the 15th Corps, retired after serving for two years in August 2005. At that time, the corps was converted to the level of a division. Major General Cihangir Akşit, who previously served as the Head of the Training Department of the General Staff was appointed as the Commander of the 15th Infantry Division, taking over from General Özkan.

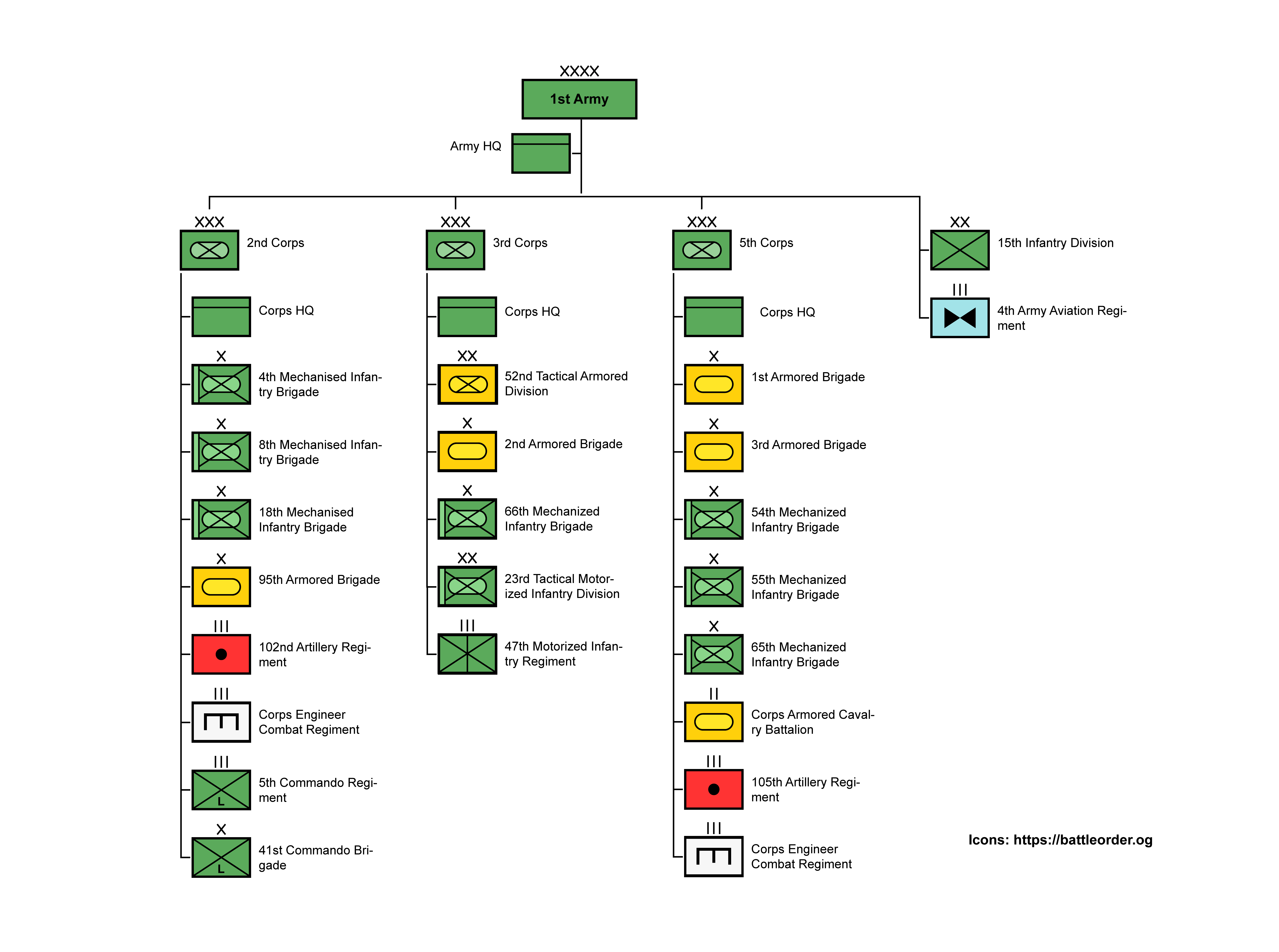
Structure of 1st Army (Turkish Army)

- First Army
  - 2nd Corps (Gelibolu, Çanakkale)
    - 4th Mechanised Infantry Brigade (Keşan)
    - 8th Mechanised Infantry Brigade (Tekirdağ)
    - 18th Mechanised Infantry Brigade (Çanakkale)
    - 95th Armored Brigade (Malkara)
    - 102nd Artillery Regiment (Uzunköprü)
    - Corps Engineer Combat Regiment (Gelibolu)
  - 3rd Corps (NATO Rapid Deployment Corps, Şişli, Istanbul)
    - 52nd Tactical Armored Division (Hadımköy, Istanbul)
    - 2nd Armored Brigade (Kartal)
    - 66th Mechanized Infantry Division – Tekirdağ Province
    - 23rd Tactical Motorized Infantry Division (Hasdal, Istanbul)
      - 6th Motorized Infantry Regiment (Hasdal, Istanbul)
      - 23rd Motorized Infantry Regiment (Samandıra, Istanbul)
      - 47th Motorized Infantry Regiment (Metris, Istanbul)
  - 5th Corps (Çorlu, Tekirdağ)
    - 1st Armored Brigade (Babaeski)
    - 3rd Armored Brigade (Çerkezköy)
    - 54th Mechanized Infantry Brigade (Edirne)
    - 55th Mechanized Infantry Brigade (Süloğlu)
    - 65th Mechanized Infantry Brigade (Lüleburgaz)
    - Corps Armored Cavalry Battalion (Ulaş)
    - 105th Artillery Regiment (Çorlu)
    - Corps Engineer Combat Regiment (Pınarhisar)
  - 15th Infantry Division (Köseköy, İzmit)
  - 4th Army Aviation Regiment (Istanbul Samandıra Army Air Base)

== See also ==
- List of commanders of the First Army of Turkey
