= Salih Omurtak =

4th Chief of the General Staff of the Turkish Armed Forces from 1946 to 1949

Salih Omurtak 1323 (1910)-P. 1
- Born: 1889; Selanik, Salonica Vilayet, Ottoman Empire
- Died: 1954 (aged 64–65); Ankara, Turkey
- Burial place: Ankara Hava Şehitliği; Transferred to Turkish State Cemetery
- Alma mater: Turkish Military Academy
- Military career
- Allegiance: Ottoman Empire; Turkey (from 1920)
- Branch: (Ottoman Empire) Ottoman Army; Turkish Land Forces
- Service years: 20 September 1907–6 July 1950
- Rank: General
- Commands: 61st Division; Chief of Staff of the Third Army; 8th Corps; 9th Corps; 3rd Corps; Member of the Supreme Military Council; Deputy Chief of the General Staff; First Army; Chief of the General Staff
- Conflicts: Italo-Turkish War; First World War; Turkish War of Independence; Genç Rebellion; Ağrı Rebellion

Salih Omurtak (1889 – 23 June 1954) was a Turkish general and the 4th Chief of the General Staff of the Turkish Armed Forces.

== Biography ==
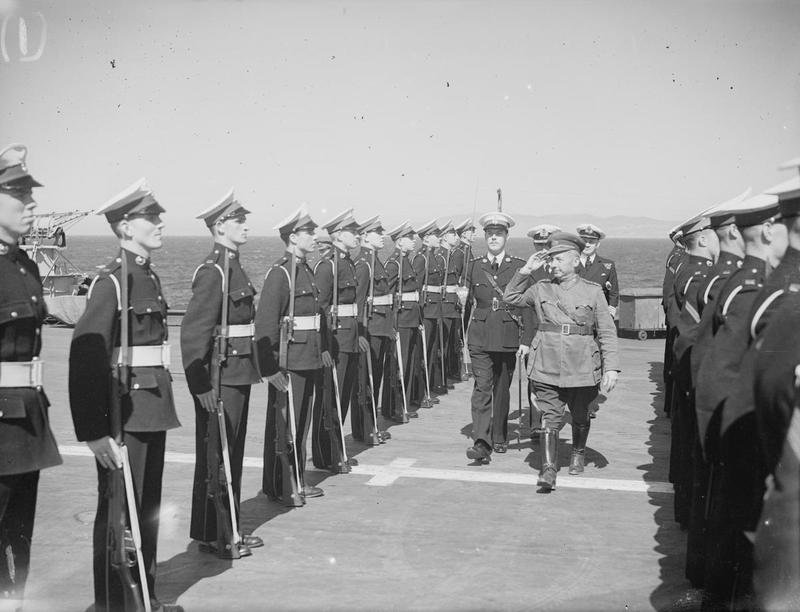
Salih Omurtak on board the Royal Navy aircraft carrier HMS Formidable (1943)

He was born 1889 in Thessaloniki, in the Salonica Vilayet of the Ottoman Empire (present-day Greece). He graduated from the Ottoman Military Academy in 1907 with the rank of a lieutenant. After finishing the Staff College in 1910, he became a staff officer and served at several headquarters in the Ottoman Army.

In 1911, he volunteered for the Yemen Expeditionary Force (see Yemeni–Ottoman conflicts) acting as an aide-de-camp and 1st Bureau Director under the Yemen General Forces Command. He also briefly served during the Italo-Turkish War in Tripoli. The Ottoman government then sent Omurtak to Germany in 1917 to serve as a military delegate during the Brest-Litovsk Peace Conference.

Following the collapse of the Ottoman Empire, Omurtak made a definitive choice to join the nationalist resistance movement. On 22 January 1920, he slipped away to Ankara to align himself with the Turkish National Movement. He then commanded various troops during and after the Turkish War of Independence, including the 61st Division as a colonel. He was promoted to the rank of the Mirliva (Tumgeneral, Major General) in 1926, and in 1930, he became a Ferik (Lieutenant General), and General in 1940. He served as Commander of the 8th Corps while holding the rank of Major General, and as Commander of the 9th Corps and 3rd Corps while holding the rank of Lieutenant General. From 1940 on, Omurtak held the commander-in-chief post of the First Army in the rank of Orgeneral.

He was appointed Chief of the General Staff of the Turkish Armed Forces on 1 August 1946 following the resignation of Kazım Orbay, and served at this position until 8 June 1949. He then stepped down due to health complications. His following duty was the membership in the Military High Advisory Board, which he held until his retirement on 6 July 1950.

Salih Omurtak died on 23 June 1954 in Ankara. His body was moved later to a permanent burial place in the Turkish State Cemetery.

== See also ==
- List of high-ranking commanders of the Turkish War of Independence

Military offices
Preceded by Cemil Cahit Toydemir	Commander of the First Army; 17 Jun 1946 – 29 July 1946	Succeeded by Nuri Yamut
Preceded by Kazım Orbay	Chief of the General Staff of Turkey; 1 August 1946 – 8 June 1949	Succeeded by Nafiz Gürman
