= List of general commanders of the Turkish Gendarmerie =

Commander of the Turkish Gendarmerie
- Türk Jandarma Genel Komutanlığı
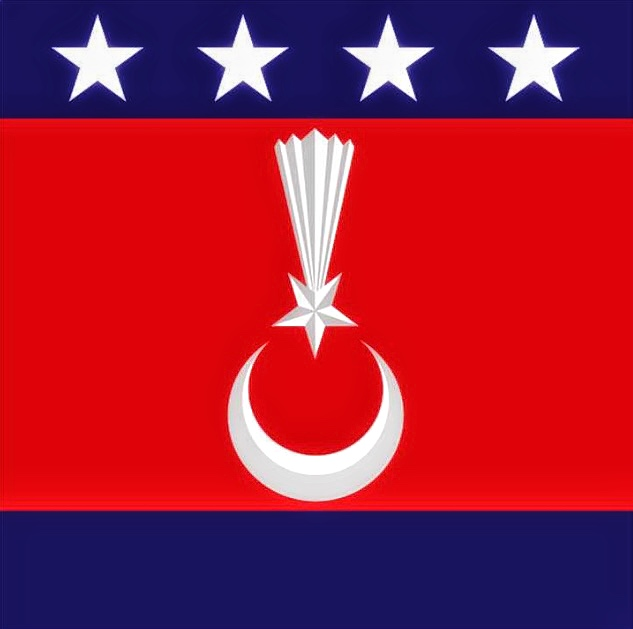
- Flag of Turkish Gendarmerie General Command
- Incumbent; General Ali Çardakcı since 16 August 2024
- Ministry of the Interior
- Member of: Turkish Gendarmerie
- Reports to: Minister of the Interior
- Formation: 29 October 1923
- First holder: Baha Hurşit Süel

This list includes general commanders of the Turkish Gendarmerie (Turkish: Türk Jandarma Genel Komutanlığı), who were, in their time of service, nominal heads of the Turkish Gendarmerie.

The current general commander of the Turkish Gendarmerie is General Arif Çetin, since 21 August 2017.

No.	General Commander	Picture	Took office	Left office
1	Colonel Baha Hurşit Süel		29 October 1923	6 June 1924
2	Colonel Ahmet Zeki Soydemir		6 June 1924	30 July 1930
3	Lieutenant general Kazım Orbay		30 July 1930	24 August 1935
4	Lieutenant general Naci Tınaz		3 September 1935	12 November 1939
5	Lieutenant general Cemil Cahit Toydemir		12 November 1939	13 July 1940
6	Lieutenant general Ali Rıza Artunkal		27 October 1940	11 October 1941
7	Lieutenant general Rüştü Akın		1 October 1941	11 January 1943
8	Lieutenant general Rıfat Mataracı		26 February 1943	3 May 1945
9	Lieutenant general Nazmi Gönenli		9 May 1945	18 October 1947
10	Lieutenant general Şükrü Kanatlı		23 October 1947	28 March 1949
11	Lieutenant general Nuri Berköz		28 March 1949	28 June 1950
12	General Kemal Yaşınkılıç		3 July 1950	24 May 1954
13	General Tahsin Çelebican		27 May 1954	27 May 1960
14	Major general Nezihi Fırat		28 May 1960	16 June 1960
15	Lieutenant general Hayati Ataker		16 June 1960	4 August 1960
16	Lieutenant general Muhittin Önür		7 September 1960	14 January 1961
17	Brigadier general Abdurrahman Doruk		16 January 1961	24 February 1962
18	Brigadier general Fahri Ogan		25 February 1962	25 July 1962
19	Lieutenant general Fikret Esen		25 July 1962	12 July 1966
20	General Haydar Sükan		12 July 1966	22 August 1968
21	General Kemal Atalay		4 September 1968	28 August 1969
22	General Semih Sancar		29 August 1969	28 August 1970
23	General Kemalettin Eken		2 September 1970	28 August 1972
24	General Orhan Yiğit		28 August 1972	30 August 1975
25	General Nurettin Ersin		22 August 1975	5 January 1976
26	Lieutenant general Şahap Yardımoğlu		26 February 1976	25 August 1978
27	General Sedat Celasun		25 August 1978	6 December 1983
28	General Mehmet Buyruk		6 December 1983	20 August 1985
29	General Fikret Oktay		20 August 1985	30 August 1986
30	General Adnan Doğu		15 August 1986	30 August 1988
31	General Burhanettin Bigalı		23 August 1988	30 August 1990
32	General Eşref Bitlis		20 August 1990	17 February 1993
33	General Aydın İlter		23 February 1993	1 September 1995
34	General Teoman Koman		30 August 1995	29 August 1997
35	General Fikret Boztepe		29 August 1997	27 August 1998
36	General Rasim Betir		27 August 1998	24 August 2000
37	General Aytaç Yalman		24 August 2000	27 August 2002
38	General Şener Eruygur		27 August 2002	26 August 2004
39	General Fevzi Türkeri		26 August 2004	24 August 2006
40	General Işık Koşaner		24 August 2006	26 August 2008
41	General Avni Atila Işık		27 August 2008	11 August 2010
42	General Necdet Özel		11 August 2010	29 July 2011
43	General Bekir Kalyoncu		4 August 2011	22 August 2013
44	General Servet Yörük		22 August 2013	22 August 2014
45	General Abdullah Atay		22 August 2014	13 August 2015
46	General Galip Mendi		13 August 2015	19 July 2016
	Lieutenant general İbrahim Yaşar (Acting)		19 July 2016	28 July 2016
47	General Yaşar Güler		29 July 2016	21 August 2017
48	General Arif Çetin		21 August 2017	16 August 2024
49	General Ali Çardakcı		16 August 2024	Incumbent

== See also ==
- List of chiefs of the Turkish General Staff
- List of commanders of the Turkish Land Forces
- List of commanders of the Turkish Naval Forces
- List of commanders of the Turkish Air Force
- List of commandants of the Turkish Coast Guard

== Sources ==
- Hizmeti Geçen Komutanlarımız in the official website of the Turkish Gendarmerie.
