= Mustafa Muğlalı =

Turkish general

Mustafa Muğlalı 1316-P. 21
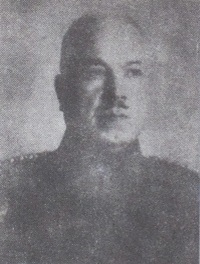
- Mustafa Muğlalı
- Born: 1882; Muğla, Ottoman Empire
- Died: 11 December 1951 (aged 69); Gülhane Military Hospital, Ankara, Turkey
- Burial place: State Cemetery
- Military career
- Allegiance: Ottoman Empire; Turkey
- Service years: Ottoman: 1901–1921; Turkey: 20 September 1921 – 26 July 1947
- Rank: Orgeneral
- Commands: Chief of Staff of Adana Area Command, Chief of Staff of the X Corps, 44th Division; 18th Division, 13th Division, 10th Division, 3rd Division, 11th Division, 41st Division, Chief of Staff of the Third Army, Deputy Second Chief of the General Staff, 57th Division, 1st Corps, Istanbul Command, 3rd Corps, 10th Corps, member of the Supreme Military Council, Third Army, member of the Military Supreme Council
- Known for: Muğlalı incident
- Conflicts: Balkan Wars; First World War; Turkish War of Independence

Mustafa Muğlalı (1882 – 11 December 1951) was an officer of the Ottoman Army and the general of the Turkish Army. He served as an officer in World War I and the Turkish War of Independence. As a General of the Third Army, he took part in the defense of Diyarbakır during the Sheikh Said Rebellion in 1925.

On February 26, 1931, he was appointed as the Acting Commander of the 1st Corps. On August 30, 1931, he was promoted to the rank of Ferik. On September 17, 1931, he was appointed as the Commander of the 1st Corps, on August 28, 1939, as the Commander of Istanbul, and on March 14, 1940, as the Commander of the 10th Corps. On August 29, 1942, he was appointed a member of the Supreme Military Council and promoted to the rank of General the next day. On February 15, 1943, he was appointed as the Commander of the 3rd Army. On August 29, 1945, he was appointed as a member of the Military Council again. He retired on July 14, 1947.

== 33 Bullets Incident ==
In 1943, Muğlalı ordered the execution of 33 alleged Kurdish smugglers, an event known as the Muğlalı incident. One of the villagers survived. In 1948, the incident was brought to the attention of the Grand National Assembly of Turkey, as potential criminal charges were discussed. On 1 September 1949, Muğlalı was arrested and charged over the incident. In February 1950, a Turkish military court found him guilty of murder and sentenced him to death. However, due to Muğlalı's old age and other extenuating circumstances, such as his dementia, his sentence was later commuted to 20 years in prison. He died in the Gülhane Military Hospital in Ankara while awaiting a final decision from the Supreme Court.

== Karahan village ==
6 Kurdish villagers were extrajudicially executed by General Mustafa Muğlalı. This was the second massacre of Muğlalı, with the possibility of more uncovered massacres having been committed.

== See also ==
- List of high-ranking commanders of the Turkish War of Independence

== Sources ==
Military offices
Preceded by Kâzım Orbay	Inspector of the Third Army; 25 February 1943 – 19 September 1945	Succeeded by Sabit Noyan
