= Novruzov =

Novruzov is a surname. Notable people with the surname include:

- Emil Novruzov (born 1995), Azerbaijani-Russian boxer
- Jahangir bey Novruzov (1894–1958), Azerbaijani military officer
- Nuraddin Novruzov (born 2003), Azerbaijani wrestler
- Nurlan Novruzov (born 1993), Azerbaijani footballer
- Siyavush Novruzov (born 1969), Azerbaijani politician
- Teymur bey Novruzov (1880–1961), Russian military officer
