= Kâzım Pasha =

Kâzım Pasha may refer to:

- Kâzım Sevüktekin (1877–1949), Turkish general
- Kâzım İnanç (1880–1938), Turkish general
- Kâzım Dirik (1881–1941), Turkish general
- Kâzım Karabekir (1882–1948), Turkish general
- Kâzım Özalp (1882–1968), Turkish general
- Kâzım Orbay (1887–1964), Turkish general
- Kazim Pasha (director), Pakistani TV director
