= Ali Sait Akbaytogan =

General of the Turkish Army

Ali Sait Akbaytogan 1311-c-P. 1
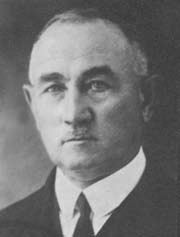
- Born: 1872; Manyas, Hüdavendigâr Vilayet, Ottoman Empire
- Died: 20 March 1950 (aged 77–78); Istanbul, Turkey
- Burial place: Zincirlikuyu Mezarlığı; State Cemetery
- Military career
- Allegiance: Ottoman Empire; Turkey
- Branch: Ottoman Army; Turkish Land Forces
- Service years: Ottoman Empire: 1896–1920; Turkey: 3 November 1921 – 30 July 1937
- Rank: General
- Commands: 39th Division, XXV Corps, Istanbul Guard; Investigation Committee of Evliye-i Selâse, Military Supreme Court, IX Corps, First Army, Third Army, member of the Supreme Military Council
- Conflicts: Italo-Turkish War; Balkan Wars; First World War; Turkish War of Independence
- Other work: Member of the GNAT (Kocaeli)

Ali Sait Akbaytogan, also known as Ali Said Pasha (1872; Manyas – 20 March 1950; Ankara) was an officer of the Ottoman Army and a general of the Turkish Army. After resigning from the Ottoman government following World War I, he joined the forces of Atatürk and participated in the Turkish War of Independence.

== See also ==
- List of high-ranking commanders of the Turkish War of Independence
- List of commanders of the First Army of Turkey
- Ahmed Fadl Al-Qomandan

== Sources ==
Military offices
Preceded by Kâzım Karabekir Pasha	Inspector of the First Army; 26 October 1924 – 21 November 1933	Succeeded by Fahrettin Altay
Preceded by Izzeddin Pasha (Çalışlar)	Inspector of the Third Army; 22 November 1933 – 24 August 1935	Succeeded by Kâzım Orbay
