= Nurettin Baransel =

7th Chief of the General Staff of the Turkish Armed Forces from 1954 to 1955

- Born: 1897; Istanbul, Ottoman Empire
- Died: 12 May 1967 (aged 69–70); Turkey
- Burial place: Zincirlikuyu Cemetery
- Alma mater: Turkish Military Academy
- Spouse: Mihriye Baransel
- Children: 2
- Military career
- Allegiance: Ottoman Empire; Turkey (from 1921)
- Branch: (Ottoman Empire) Ottoman Army; Turkish Land Forces
- Service years: 1912–1955
- Rank: General
- Commands: Chief of the Turkish General Staff; Commander of the Turkish Land Forces; Commander of the First Army of Turkey; Commander of the Third Army of Turkey
- Conflicts: Balkan Wars; World War I; Turkish War of Independence
- Awards: Medal of Independence

Ahmet Nurettin Baransel (1897 – 21 May 1967) was a Turkish general who served as the 7th chief of the Turkish General Staff from 28 May 1954 to 25 August 1955, 4th commander of the Turkish Land Forces from 25 June 1956 to 16 September 1957, 12th commander of the First Army from 4 November 1952 to 6 April 1954, and the 11th commander of the Third Army.

Baransel was born in Istanbul. He obtained his graduation from the Turkish Military Academy in 1912, and as a staff officer he graduated from the same academy in 1925. He was promoted to the rank of brigadier general in 1939, major general in 1941, lieutenant general in 1947, and four-star general in 1951.

== Career ==
Baransel started his career in 1912 after obtaining his graduation. He was appointed in the Army as a team, adjutant and company commander until 1919. He participated in the World War I and the Turkish War of Independence.

He commanded the 7th Aircraft Company Command, Eskişehir Aircraft Station Command, Air Detachment Chief of Staff, General Staff Air Control Command, İzmir Air Group Command, 69th Regiment Battalion Command, 7th and 8th Corps. He also commanded the 11th Regiment of the Third Division, 13th Regiment of the 5th Division, Ağrı Border Brigade Command, and became faculty member of the Turkish War Academies.

As a brigadier general he served as deputy commander of the 1st Cavalry Division. After his promotion to major general, he was commander of the 16th, 5th, 22nd and 17th divisions between 1941 and 1947, and finally chief of staff of the 1st Army. As a lieutenant general, he commanded the 3rd, 6th Corps, in addition to serving as deputy commander of the Third Army.
