= Kemalettin Eken =

General Kemalettin Ekin (1911, Istanbul - 14 January 1989) was a Turkish soldier.

He graduated from the Military School in 1933 as an Infantry Ensign. Later he commanded the 95th Infantry Regiment at Malkara, seemingly within a division of the 2nd Corps in 1959–60, then the 57th Training Division at Manisa, then, in the late 1960s, both the 7th Corps and the 9th Corps. From 1970 to 1972 he was the General Commander of the Turkish Gendarmerie.
