= List of commanders of the Third Army of Turkey =

This list includes commanders of the Third Army of Turkey, who were, in their time of service, nominal heads of the Third Army (Turkish: Üçüncü Ordu), one of the four field armies of the Turkish Land Forces.

The current Commander of the Third Army is Lieutenant general Veli Tarakcı, since 10 August 2023.

No.	Commander	Picture	Took office	Left office
1	General Cevat Çobanlı		21 October 1922	31 October 1924
2	Lieutenant general Kâzım İnanç		31 October 1924	20 June 1925
3	General İzzettin Çalışlar		20 June 1925	22 November 1933
4	General Ali Sait Akbaytogan		22 November 1933	24 August 1935
5	General Kâzım Orbay		24 August 1935	1 December 1943
6	General Mustafa Muğlalı		1 December 1943	29 August 1945
7	General Sabit Noyan		29 August 1945	31 January 1946
8	General Kurtcebe Noyan		31 January 1946	18 May 1948
9	General İzzet Aksalur		18 May 1948	15 September 1949
10	General Mahmut Berköz		15 September 1949	6 June 1950
11	General Nurettin Baransel		6 June 1950	4 November 1952
12	General Feyzi Mengüç		4 November 1952	29 September 1955
13	General Nazmi Ataç		29 September 1955	16 June 1956
14	General Necati Tacan		16 June 1956	30 November 1957
15	General Cemal Gürsel		30 November 1957	21 August 1958
16	General Ragıp Gümüşpala		21 August 1958	3 June 1960
17	Lieutenant general Celal Alkoç		4 August 1960	6 January 1961
18	General Ahmet Refik Yılmaz		23 June 1961	29 August 1963
19	General Refik Tulga		29 August 1963	1 September 1964
20	General Memduh Tağmaç		1 September 1964	12 July 1966
21	General Fikret Esen		12 July 1966	29 August 1967
22	General Refet Ülgenalp		29 August 1967	28 August 1969
23	General Faik Türün		28 August 1969	29 September 1970
24	General Eşref Akıncı		28 September 1970	7 March 1973
25	General Hamza Gürgüç		7 March 1973	30 August 1974
26	General Namık Kemal Ersun		28 August 1974	29 March 1975
27	General Ali Fethi Esener		28 August 1975	28 August 1976
28	General Sedat Celasun		30 August 1976	25 August 1977
29	General Mahmut Ülker		30 August 1977	25 August 1979
30	General Selahattin Demircioğlu		25 August 1979	25 August 1982
31	General Fikret Oktay		25 August 1982	25 August 1985
32	General Hüsnü Çelenkler		25 August 1985	28 August 1986
33	General Sabri Yirmibeşoğlu		28 August 1986	28 August 1988
34	General Nezihi Çakar		28 August 1988	28 August 1990
35	General Hikmet Bayar		30 August 1990	17 August 1992
36	General Teoman Koman		17 August 1992	30 August 1995
37	General Atilla Ateş		30 August 1995	26 August 1997
38	General Nahit Şenoğul		26 August 1997	30 August 1999
39	General Tunçer Kılınç		30 August 1999	30 August 2001
40	General Tamer Akbaş		30 August 2001	30 August 2003
41	General Oktar Ataman		30 August 2003	30 August 2004
42	General Orhan Yöney		30 August 2004	30 August 2006
43	General İsmail Koçman		30 August 2006	17 August 2007
44	General Saldıray Berk		17 August 2007	30 August 2010
45	General Yalçın Ataman		30 August 2010	30 August 2011
46	General Ahmet Turmuş		30 August 2011	23 August 2013
47	General Ümit Dündar		23 August 2013	8 August 2015
48	General İsmail Serdar Savaş		8 August 2015	22 August 2019
49	Lieutenant general Şeref Öngay		22 August 2019	24 August 2021
50	Lieutenant general Yavuz Türkgenci		24 August 2021	10 August 2023
51	Lieutenant general Veli Tarakcı		10 August 2023	Incumbent

== See also ==
- Chief of the Turkish General Staff
- List of commanders of the Turkish Land Forces
