= Sabit Noyan =

Sabit Noyan 1321-P. 30
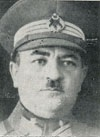
- Born: 1887; Istanbul, Ottoman Empire
- Died: 1967 (aged 79–80); Istanbul, Turkey
- Burial place: Zincirlikuyu Mezarlığı; State Cemetery
- Military career
- Allegiance: Ottoman Empire; Turkey
- Service years: Ottoman: 1905–1920; Turkey: December, 1920 – May 18, 1948
- Rank: Orgeneral
- Nickname: "Nabit Koyan"
- Commands: Chief of Staff of the Independent Hejaz Division, Chief of Staff of the Hejaz Command, 4th division of the General Staff; Officer Candidate School, 190th Regiment, Deputy Inspector of the Military Schools, Infantry Brigade of the 6th Division, Supply Staff of the First Army, 57th Division, Intelligence division of the General Staff, 5th Division, V Corps (deputy), Chief of Staff of the Third Army, Undersecretary of Ground Forces of the Ministry of National Defense, 20th Division, II Corps, Vice chief of Military Training of the Ministry of National Defense, I Corps, Martial Law Command, Istanbul Command, Third Army, Member of the Supreme Military Council
- Conflicts: Balkan Wars; First World War; Turkish War of Independence

Sabit Noyan (1887; Istanbul - 1967; Istanbul) was an officer of the Ottoman Army and a general of the Turkish Army.

== See also ==
- List of high-ranking commanders of the Turkish War of Independence

== Sources ==
Military offices
Preceded by Mustafa Muğlalı	Inspector of the Third Army; September 12, 1945–February 15, 1946	Succeeded by Kurtcebe Noyan
