= Hakkı Tunaboylu =

8th Chief of the General Staff of the Turkish Armed Forces from 1955 to 1957

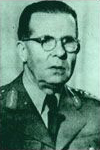

8th Chief of the General Staff
- In office 25 August 1955 – 03 October 1957
- Preceded by: Nurettin Baransel
- Succeeded by: Feyzi Mengüç

Personal details
- Born: 1895 Rahova, Ottoman Empire
- Died: 28 October 1958 (aged 63) Istanbul, Turkey
- Education: Turkish Military Academy

Military service
- Allegiance: Ottoman Empire; Turkey (from 1921)
- Branch/service: (Ottoman Empire) Ottoman Army; Turkish Land Forces
- Years of service: 1914–1957 (46 years)
- Rank: General
- Battles/wars: World War I Turkish War of Independence

Hakkı Tunaboylu (1895– 23 July 1958) was the 8th Chief of the General Staff of Turkey.

== Career ==
He graduated from the Turkish Military Academy and served as an artillery officer during World War I. Tunaboylu joined the war effort for the Turkish War of Independence on 31 July 1921. After graduating from the Army War College in 1927, he served in various commands till 1945 when he was promoted to Brigadier General. In 1947, he became a Major-General, Lieutenant General in 1950 and ascended the rank of General in 1955. He served as acting Chief of General Staff between 25 August 1955 – 17 September 1955, and as 8th Chief of General Staff until retirement on 3 October 1957.

He died on 28 October 1958 while serving as an elected member of the 11th Turkish Parliament from the Democat Party.
