= Cihangir Berker =

Turkish major general

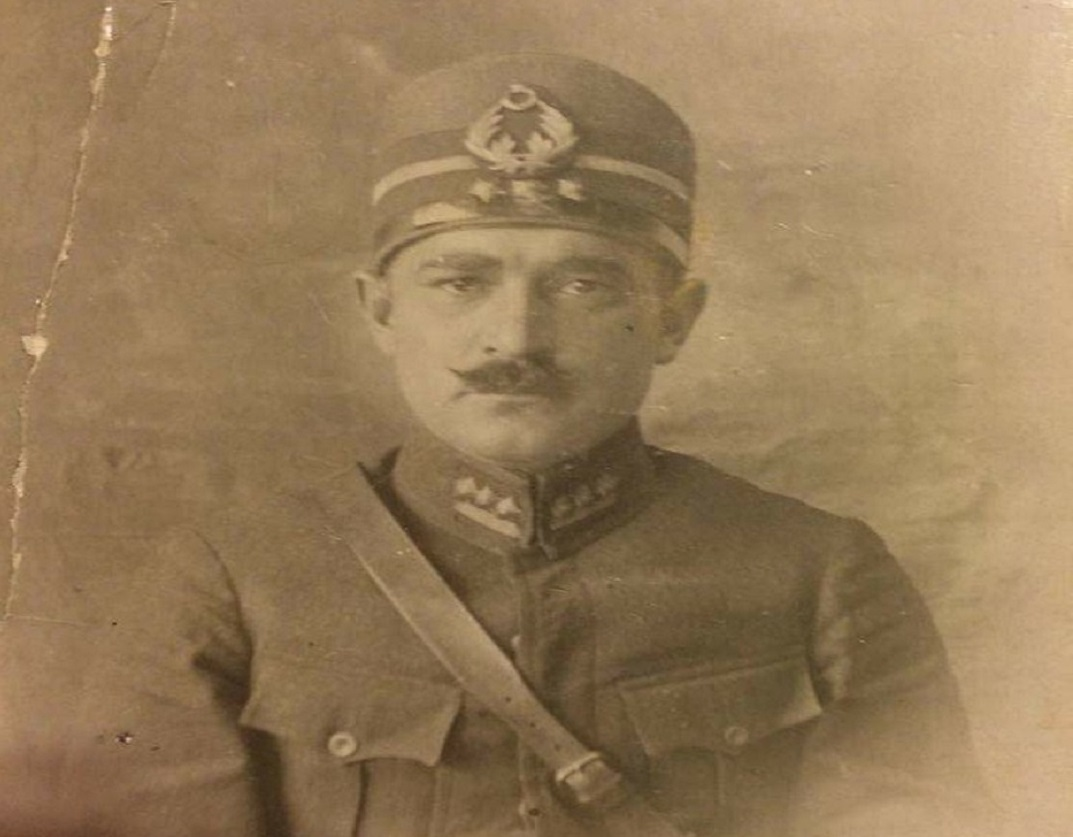
- Born: 1894; Baku, Russian Empire
- Died: 1958 (aged 63–64); İzmir, Turkey
- Military career
- Allegiance: Azerbaijan (1918–1920); Turkey (1920–1953)
- Branch: Artillery
- Service years: 1918–1953
- Rank: Major general
- Commands: Artillery division in İzmir and Kütahya
- Conflicts: Battle of Baku; Red Army invasion of Azerbaijan; Turkish Independence War
- Awards: Medal of Independence

Cihangir Berker (1894–1958) was a captain in the Azerbaijan Democratic Republic and later a brigadier general in the Turkish Armed Forces.

He participated in battles in Baku, Karabakh and Zangezur, as well as in uprisings in Ganja and Karabakh.

He also took part in the Turkish War of Independence and served for 33 years in the Turkish Armed Forces.

== Life and education ==
Cihangir Berker (his birth name was Jahangir bey Novruzov) was born in 1894 into a military family of Yusif bey Novruzov in Baku. He received his education at the Tiflis Military School. During his studies, he became acquainted with Sultan Majid Ganizadeh, Mahammad Amin Rasulzadeh, and Fatali Khan Khoyski. In April 1918, he was arrested but later released from captivity and sent to Ganja with the assistance of Azerbaijani national activists.

== Military service ==
=== During World War I ===
At the age of 18, he served as a lieutenant in the cavalry division of the Dragon Regiment during World War I.

=== İn the Republic of Azerbaijan ===
After Azerbaijan declared independence on May 28, 1918, following this, Cihangir Berker, along with his relatives, Colonel Teymur bey Novruzov, Colonel Kazım bey Novruzov, and his nephew, Mayor Rustem Novruzov, joined the Republic's army. He participated in the victorious Baku campaign, alongside the Islamic Army of the Caucasus as part of the Azerbaijani Special Corps, from mid-June to September 15, contributing to the success in Baku's battles.

On September 15, 1918, after Baku was liberated from occupation, the movement for Karabakh began on September 23, 1918. The forces involved in the Karabakh movement included the 9th and 106th Turkish regiments, national volunteer units, and the 1st Azerbaijani Division. Cihangir Berker served as a senior lieutenant in charge of the artillery battery within the 1st Azerbaijani Division. The Islamic Army of the Caucasus initiated an attack towards Shusha from Aghdam on October 4. Following continuous artillery fire, including that from his artillery battery and others in the 1st Azerbaijani Division, enemy forces around Ayri village fled and dispersed. By October 8, 1918, Shusha was completely cleared of Armenian-Dashnak forces, and the Islamic Army of the Caucasus entered the city.

In October 1918, with the artillery battery under his command, Cihangir Berker participated in battles against Armenian separatists who were committing atrocities against the peaceful population in Karabakh and Zangezur. His service contributed significantly to stabilizing the region's security, and he was honored with the rank of captain for his dedication.

On March 21, 1920, Armenian-Dashnak forces launched a sudden attack on the positions of the Cavanshir infantry regiment located in Askeran, capturing Askeran and starting an uprising. On March 26, 1920, the Azerbaijani army initiated a large-scale offensive against the forces of Dron in the Askeran direction. As an officer of the national army, Cihangir Berker participated in the battles with his artillery battery. The intense battles that began in Askeran ended with the victory of the Azerbaijani army. By the middle of April, the enemy forces were completely defeated in the ongoing battles.

After the fall of the Republic, Cihangir Berker participated in the May 1920 Ganja revolt against the Bolsheviks as part of the 1st Infantry Division of the Azerbaijani army, alongside other units and volunteer detachments. After several days of defending Ganja, he moved to Karabakh and joined the Karabakh Uprising in June 1920 under the leadership of Nuru Pasha. After the suppression of the uprising, together with the surviving soldiers of the Republic's cavalry and infantry regiments, they retreated towards Garyagin and Jabrayil, crossing the Aras River and entering Iran.

=== In Turkey ===
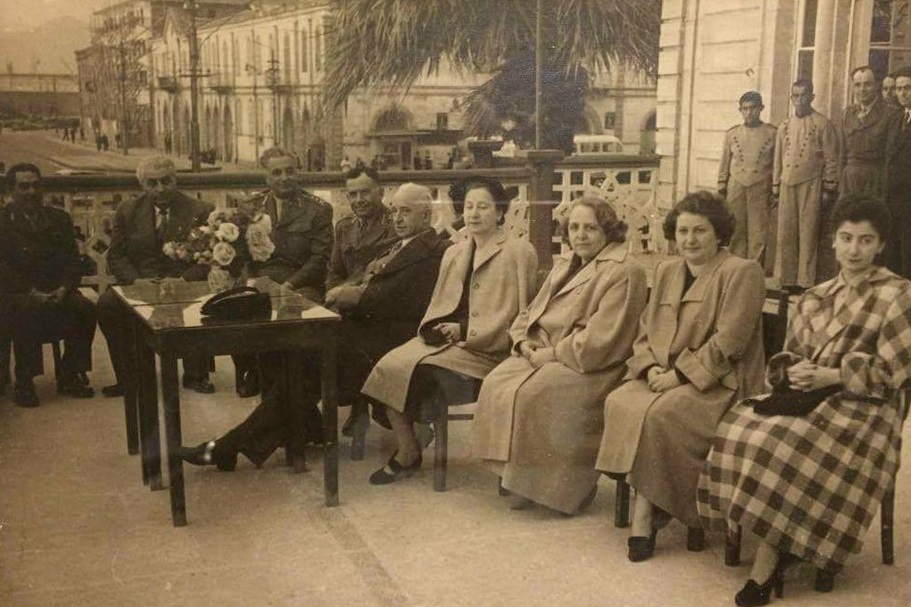
İsmet İnönü, Cihangir Berker and others

==== War of liberation ====
After the uprisings against the Soviet occupation were defeated, some of the remaining soldiers of the Azerbaijani Republic's army crossed into Zangezur and then to Nakhchivan, while others headed towards Khudafarin and entered Iran. As they neared the Turkish border, Nuh bey Sofiyev, who led the Azerbaijani soldiers, handed over command to Samed bey Refibeyli. Under Samed bey's leadership, they first reached East Beyazit and then in June and July, arrived at Hasan-Kala and Erzurum. Following a decision by the Grand National Assembly of Turkey, a 1200-strong Azerbaijani unit, comprising a cavalry, infantry battalion, and artillery battery, was accepted into the ranks of the East Army (XV Corps) commanded by Kazim Karabekir Pasha. Cihangir Berker was one of the 56 officers among the 1200 soldiers in the Azerbaijani unit.

He took part in the Eastern campaign from the autumn of 1920 until early 1921, which culminated in the cleansing of Eastern Anatolia from Armenians. He participated in battles aimed at reclaiming Sarıkamış, Kars, and Gyumri. During one of the clashes around Kars, he sustained a severe shrapnel wound to his mouth. Following the Eastern campaign, he was sent to the Western front with his artillery battery. Particularly notable was his artillery's precise fire near the Berna field in Benliahmet village near Kars, which successfully repelled enemy aircraft from the battle zone. He also participated in the battles resulting in the liberation of İzmir from Greek occupation. For his service during the Turkish War of Independence in 1923, he was honored with the "Independence" medal. After the War of Liberation, he continued his military service within the army.

==== Subsequent service ====
In 1925, he participated in suppressing the Sheikh Said rebellion, followed by involvement in the First Aghrı Rebellion in 1926 and the Second Aghrı Rebellion in 1927.

In 1928, he entered the Military Academy to further his education. Upon graduating in 1929, he attained the rank of "minbashı." He became the commander of the artillery regiment stationed under the Chief Command in Kütahya.

Due to his brave and courageous fighting in battles, he was honored with the title "Berker," signifying a brave, gallant warrior. After the introduction of the Surname Law in Turkey on June 21, 1934, he adopted "Berker" as his surname.

He was promoted to the rank of Brigadier General on August 8, 1948. He served as the garrison commander in İzmir and later held positions as an inland area commander. He retired in 1953 upon reaching the retirement age

== Death ==
Cihangir Berker suffered from several heart attacks. On July 20, 1958, he died due to a heart attack. The general was laid to rest with military honors at the Bornova Cemetery.

== Family ==
Cihangir Berker (Jahangir bey Novruzov) is a representative of the military Novruzov family from Govlar village in Tovuz. Within this lineage, there have been notable military figures like General-Lieutenant Mirza Haji bey Novruzov, Guard Colonel Karim Novruzov, Major General Teymur bey Novruzov, and Major Rustam Novruzov. According to Berker's writings, his father, Karim Pasha, served as the commander of the internal guard of the Russian Tsar, while his grandfather, Yusif bey Novruzov, was the commander of the 13th Cavalry Regiment.

On January 20, 1958, in a letter to his daughter, Cihangir Berker wrote about his family:

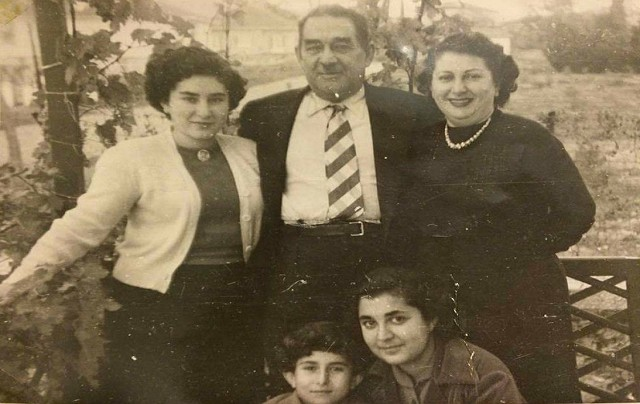
Cihangir Berker with his family

My mother is the daughter of Colonel Zaur from the Kabarday tribe. This person, my father, after retiring, settled on his estate near Guba. The surname is Novruzov, which is also our family name, passed down from my father. My mother Leyli got married to my father before graduating from Baku's Girls' School. At that time, my father was a senior lieutenant in the 44th Nizhny Novgorod Dragoon Regiment. We were three boys and one girl, the children of this family. The eldest was Teymur. During the First World War, he served in the 44th regiment, where my father also served. After the establishment of the Azerbaijan Republic, he was appointed as the commander of the cavalry division. My second brother was Kazim. During the First World War, he commanded the 2nd battery of the 33rd Russian Infantry Division's artillery brigade. During the time of the Azerbaijan government, he held the rank of colonel and served as the commander of the Artillery Regiment. Kazim was married and had a son named Jabrail, who would now be around 47-48 years old if he is still alive. My sister Zumrud, at the age of 18, married Tastan Bey from the Shamxaloğulları family in Crimea. Our son-in-law was also a Podpolkovnik in the Crimea Cavalry Regiment. I was the youngest in the family. When World War I began, I was 18 years old and served as a lieutenant in the Dragoon Regiment's cavalry division. At the age of 96, my father, Karim Pasha, was still the commander of the Russian czar's internal guard and did not retire until his final days. His life is a long story.

He met Vasfiye Hanım, the daughter of the late Mehmet Arzak Bey, who was a member of the Ottoman Parliament representing Erzurum, during his service in Erzurum. They were married in 1929 and had three children named Gungor, Gunaç, and Aynur. Gungor became close friends with Orkhan Aghpolad, the son of Colonel Mehmet Akpolat from Ganja, and eventually, they formed their own family.

== Awards ==
- In 1923, he was honored with the "Independence" medal for his services during the Turkish War of Independence.

== See also ==
- Nuri Berköz
- Samet Saygın

== Sources ==
- Назирли, Шамистан (2005). Жизнь генерала Алиаги Шыхлинского (140-летию со дня рождения). Baku.
