= Kemal Yaşınkılıç =

Turkish statesperson (1891–1975)

Army General Kemal Yaşınkılıç (1871–1975) was a Turkish soldier (1911–1954) and parliamentarian.

He served in the İslahiye 39 Mountain Brigade, in the 33rd Division (Yassıviran), 23rd Division (Turkey) Safranbolu, Devrek 19, Sarykamysh 9th and 3rd Division Commander, and in 18th Corps Command, and as Commander of the Gendarmerie General Command (1951–54). In the 10th Parliament of Turkey (1954–57) he served as a deputy for Edirne. He was married and has three children.

Military offices
Preceded by Nuri Berköz	General Commanders of Gendarmerie; 1951–1954	Succeeded by Tahsin Çelebican
