= 9th Commando Brigade =

Turkish commando brigade

- Founded: 2016
- Country: Turkey
- Branch: Army
- Type: Infantry
- Size: Brigade
- Part of: 9th Corps
- Garrison/HQ: Sarıkamış
- Engagements: Operation Olive Branch

Commanders
- Current commander: Brigadier Gen. Mustafa Koşan

The 9th Commando Brigade is one of the 12 infantry brigades designated as commando in Turkish Land Forces. It is under the 9th Corps and is headquartered at Sarıkamış, Kars Province. Search and rescue training is given to soldiers in the brigade. The brigade was involved in Operation Olive Branch.

It appears to trace its history to the 9th Infantry Division, located at Sarikamis since the 1930s. Following the abolition of the Western Front Command on 1 September 1923, the 9th Division was reported as part of the 3rd Army Inspectorate (Ordu Müfettişlikleri) and then the 3rd Army at several dates since.

== See also ==
- List of commando units § Turkey
