= Şükrü Naili Gökberk =

Turkish politician

Selanikli Şükrü Naili Gökberk
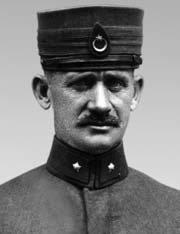
- Born: 1876; Selanik, Salonica Vilayet, Ottoman Empire
- Died: 26 October 1936 (aged 59–60); Edirne, Turkey
- Burial place: Edirnekapı Şehitliği; State Cemetery
- Military career
- Allegiance: Ottoman Empire; Turkey
- Service years: Ottoman Empire: 1899–1920; Turkey: 25 April 1921 – 8 October 1934
- Rank: General
- Commands: Chief of Staff of the 7th Division, 50th Division, 49th Division; 15th Division, Ankara Command, Committee for Occupation and Restitution of Adana Area, Mersin Area Command, III Corps
- Conflicts: Balkan Wars; First World War; Turkish War of Independence
- Other work: Member of the GNAT (Kırklareli); Member of the GNAT (Istanbul)

Şükrü Naili Gökberk (1876 in Selanik, Salonica Vilayet, Ottoman Empire – 26 October 1936 in Edirne, Turkey) was an officer of the Ottoman Army during World War I, reaching the rank of miralay (senior colonel / brigadier) on 1 September 1917; and of the Turkish Army during the Turkish War of Independence, reaching the rank of mirliva (brigadier general) on 31 August 1922. He was promoted to the rank of ferik (major general) on 30 August 1926.

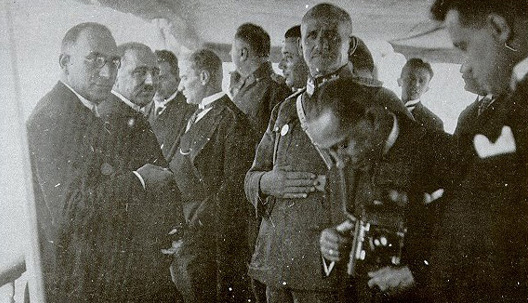
On the deck of Ertuğrul yacht. From left to right: Nuri Bey (Conker) and Salih Bey (Bozok), Mustafa Kemal Pasha (Atatürk), Fahreddin Pasha (Altay, behind Mustafa Kemal), Shukri Naili Pasha (Gökberk)

He commanded a division of the Ottoman Army in the defense of the Gallipoli peninsula during the Gallipoli campaign of World War I. Towards the end of World War I, he was in the Palestinian front. He later fought in the Turkish War of Independence where he commanded the Turkish forces (3rd Corps) of the Ankara government which entered Istanbul with a ceremony on 6 October 1923, following the end of the city's occupation by the Allies of World War I.

He was a member of parliament at the Grand National Assembly of Turkey in Ankara for two terms, first for Kırklareli (1923) and later for Istanbul (1935).

== See also ==
- List of high-ranking commanders of the Turkish War of Independence
