= 4th Mechanised Infantry Brigade (Turkey) =

Brigade of the Turkish Army based in Keşan, Edirne Province

- Country: Turkey
- Branch: Turkish Army
- Type: Infantry
- Role: Greek border monitoring
- Size: Unknown
- Garrison/HQ: Keşan, Edirne Province

Commanders
- Current commander: Brigadier Gen. Hasan Demir

The 4th Mechanised Infantry Brigade (Turkish: 4. Mekanize Piyade Tugayı) is a brigade of the Turkish Army based in the Marmara region at the town of Keşan in Edirne Province. It is part of the Army's 2nd Corps based at Gelibolu in Çanakkale Province, in the General Fevzi Mengüç Barracks, and is in charge of monitoring the Greek border.

== History ==
During the War of Independence the division fought in the Battle of the Sakarya.

During World War II, the 4th Infantry Division was based in Gallipoli. It was listed as part of the 2nd Corps, First Army in 1941.

The division may have included the 40th, 42nd, and 58th Regiments (in which future political figure Alparslan Türkeş served during the war).

Nurettin Ersin served as the 4. Piyade Tümen Komutanı (4th Infantry Division Commander) from 1969 to 1970. He became the Commander of the Cyprus Turkish Peace Forces/XI Corps (1974) and ultimately the Commander of the Land Forces and Chief of the General Staff.

It still existed as a division in 1987-88. Since 1994, it has been transformed into a modern military formation as a mechanised infantry brigade.

From 2016 to 2020, servicemen of the 4th Mechanised Infantry Brigade, alongside the 54th Mechanised Infantry Brigade, Edirne Police Department and Gendarmerie General Command, detained over a thousand people convicted of being part of the Gülen movement, as well as PKK and MLKP members who tried to cross the Greek border. Its previous commander was Brig. Gen. Hasan Demir.
