= Third Army (Turkey) =

Field army of the Turkish Army located in Erzurum

- Active: October 1923 – present
- Country: Turkey
- Size: 80.000 active personnel
- Part of: Turkish Army
- Garrison/HQ: Erzincan
- Engagements: Sheikh Said rebellion Ararat rebellion

Commanders
- Commander: Lieutenant General Yavuz Türkgenci
- Chief of staff: Major General Davut Ala
- Notable commanders: Cevat Çobanlı (1923–1924); Kâzım İnanç (1925); İzzettin Çalışlar (1925–1933); Ali Sait Akbaytoğan (1933–1935); Kâzım Orbay (1935–1943); Mustafa Muğlalı (1943–1945); Sabit Noyan (1945–1946); Kurtcebe Noyan (1946–1948)

The Turkish Third Army (Turkish: 3'üncü Ordu Komutanlığı) is a field army of the Turkish Army, active since the 1920s.

The headquarters of the commander moved from Erzurum to Erzincan in 1967.

== History ==
The Third Army traces its origins to 1923, but further back, the Ninth Army Troops Inspectorate (Dokuzuncu Ordu Kıt'aatı Müfettişliği), Erzurum, Inspector: Mirliva Mustafa Kemal Pasha, was redesignated the Third Army Troops Inspectorate on 15 June 1919.

The Muğlalı incident was a massacre of 32 Kurdish and Küresünni civilians in July 1943, in Özalp, Van. They were executed for alleged animal smuggling on the orders of the army commander, General Mustafa Muğlalı. Muğlalı was charged years later but died in prison awaiting trail.

The dispositions of the Third Army in 1945 are described in the British Military Attache's reports as Hamza Bilgu reported in his article of 2026, pages 130-134.

General Ragıp Gümüşpala commanded the army between 1958 and 1960. In the days of the Soviet Union the Third Army was stationed on the Caucasus border to counter any Soviet attack by the Transcaucasus Military District. In 1973 the Army, with headquarters at Erzincan, had the 8th Corps at Elazığ (including the 12th Infantry Division (Turkey), today 12th Mechanised Infantry Brigade at Ağrı), the 9th Corps at Erzurum (including 9th Infantry Division at Sarıkamış (which was active to at least 1996), and the 11th Corps at Trabzon.

After 1974–75 and the Turkish invasion of Cyprus 11th Corps headquarters was moved to North Cyprus.

Following the dissolution of the Warsaw Pact and the Soviet Union, the General Staff decided to send 120,000 men of the Third Army to the border with Iraq. This was done in order to increase readiness against any possible crisis in the area (such as during the Persian Gulf War and Iraq War). Most of the armored, mechanized, and commando brigades are located in the central region in order to act rapidly into any scenario around Turkey's borders. Today, the army garrisons the Turkish borders with Armenia and Georgia.

Some 300 men from the Third Army were sent to serve alongside the United Nations troops in Somalia (UNITAF/UNOSOM II). In addition, Lieutenant General Cevik Bir, who had previously commanded the army's 4th Armoured Brigade, became Force Commander of UNOSOM II (1992–95).

9th Infantry Division was seemingly disbanded in 2005. A Russian source in 2007 gave the following details on the army:

"the 3rd Field Army, consist[s] of 8th and 9th Army Corps, 48th Separate Infantry Brigade, 4th Separate Armoured Brigade." 9th Army Corps, which has in its composition: the 3rd infantry division, 7th, 14th, 25th separate mechanized brigade, separate mechanized infantry battalion, a separate tank battalion, deployed in the area Argadan, Kagysman, Erzurum, along the Turkish-Georgian and Armenian–Turkish border. 8th Army Corps has in its composition: 10th separate infantry brigade, 1st, 12th (Ağrı), 34th, 42nd Mechanized Brigades, 9th Separate Armored Brigade and 151st Artillery Regiment IRGC (Iranian Revolutionary Guard), located along the Turkish–Iranian border."

== Order of Battle, 1941 ==
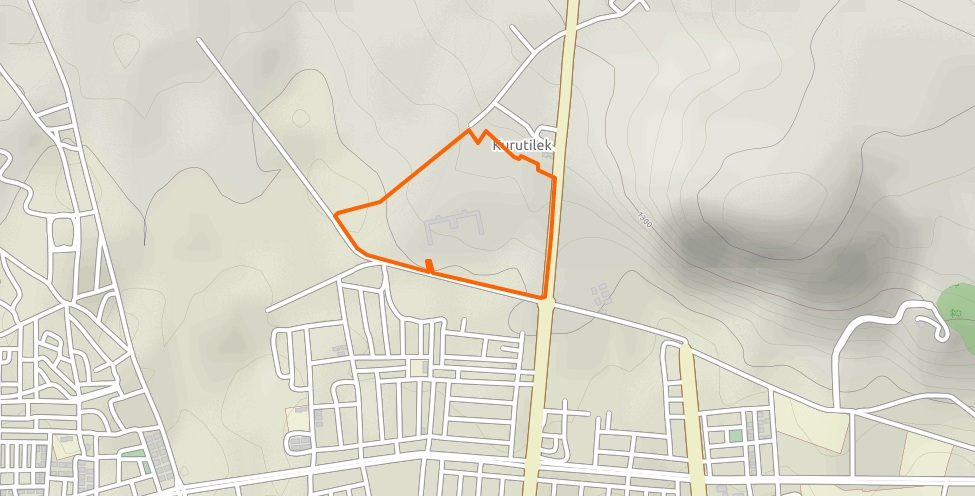
3rd Army Command residential area, Erzincan Province.

In June 1941, the Third Army was organized as follows:

- Eastern Area
  - 9th Corps (Sarıkamış)
  - Erzurum Fortified Area Command
  - 8th Corps (Merzifon)
  - 7th Corps (Diyarbakır)
  - 18th Corps (Kars)
  - Kars Fortified Area Command

== See also ==
- List of Commanders of the Third Army of Turkey
