= Naci Tınaz =

Turkish politician

Naci Tınaz 1320-P. 3
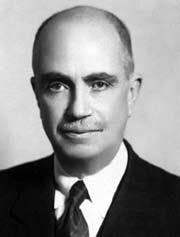
- Born: 1882; Serfiçe (Servia), Ottoman Empire
- Died: 25 November 1964 (aged 81–82); Istanbul, Turkey
- Burial place: Ankara Şehitliği; State Cemetery
- Military career
- Allegiance: Ottoman Empire; Turkey
- Service years: Ottoman Empire: 1904–1920; Turkey: 10 January 1921 – 29 December 1938
- Rank: Lieutenant general
- Commands: Chief of Staff of the I Corps (deputy), 1st division of the III Corps (deputy), Chief of Staff of the III Corps, Chief of Staff of the XX Corps, Deputy Director of the 2nd division of the General Staff; Chief of Staff of the Western Front, 15th Division, VI Corps, Undersecretary of the Ministry of National Defense, Undersecretary of Ground Forces of the Ministry of National Defense, Chief undersecretary of the Ministry of National Defense, IV Corps, General Commander of the Gendarmerie
- Conflicts: Italo-Turkish War; Balkan Wars; First World War; Turkish War of Independence
- Other work: Member of the GNAT (Bursa); Member of the GNAT (Ankara); Minister of National Defence

Naci Tınaz (1882 in Serfiçe (Servia) – 25 November 1964 in Istanbul) was an officer of the Ottoman Army and a general of the Turkish Army.

== See also ==
- List of high-ranking commanders of the Turkish War of Independence
- List of general commanders of the Turkish Gendarmerie
- List of ministers of national defense of Turkey

== Sources ==
Military offices
Preceded by Kâzım Orbay	General Commanders of Gendarmerie; 3 September 1935–31 December 1938	Succeeded by Cemil Cahit Toydemir
