= Ali Hikmet Ayerdem =

Turkish politician

Ali Hikmet Ayerdem 1314-P. 16
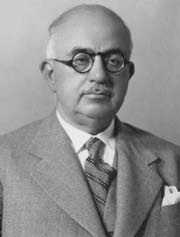
- Born: 1877; Larissa, Ottoman Empire
- Died: March 21, 1939; Istanbul, Turkey
- Burial place: Zincirlikuyu Mezarlığı; State Cemetery
- Military career
- Allegiance: Ottoman Empire; Turkey
- Service years: Ottoman Empire: 1899–1920; Turkey: January 28, 1921 – May 26, 1935
- Rank: General
- Commands: Chief of Staff of the IV Corps, 49th Division, Izmir Railway; 12th Division, Undersecretary of the Ministry of National Defense, II Corps, VI Corps
- Conflicts: Italo-Turkish War; Balkan Wars; First World War; Turkish War of Independence
- Other work: Member of the GNAT (Bursa); Member of the GNAT (Gaziantep)

Ali Hikmet Ayerdem (1877; Larissa – March 21, 1939; Istanbul) was an officer of the Ottoman Army and a general of the Turkish Army.

== See also ==
- List of high-ranking commanders of the Turkish War of Independence
