= Cemil Cahit Toydemir =

Turkish Army general

Cemil Cahit Toydemir 1318-P. 311
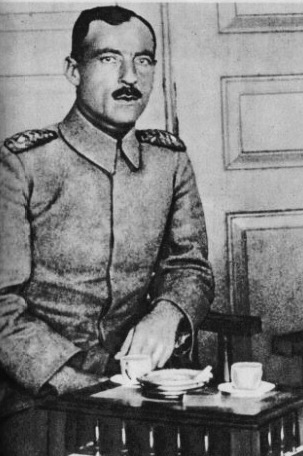
- Born: 1883; Istanbul, Ottoman Empire
- Died: July 15, 1956 (aged 72–73); Istanbul, Turkey
- Burial place: Edirnekapı Şehitliği; State Cemetery
- Military career
- Allegiance: Ottoman Empire; Turkey
- Service years: Ottoman Empire: 1902–1920; Turkey: May 1919 – June 15, 1946
- Rank: General
- Commands: 53rd Regiment, 33rd Division (deputy), 4th Caucasian, 1st Caucasian Division; 5th Caucasian, 10th Division, Inspector of the Thrace 1st Gendarmerie Area, 41st Division, 11th Division, Undersecretary of the Army of the Ministry of National Defense, V Corps, deputy president of the Military Supreme Court, General Commander of the Gendarmerie, XX Corps, president of the Military Supreme Court, First Army
- Conflicts: Italo-Turkish War; Balkan Wars; First World War; Turkish War of Independence
- Other work: Member of the GNAT (Istanbul); Minister of National Defence

Cemil Cahit Toydemir (1883 – July 15, 1956) was an officer of the Ottoman Army and a general of the Turkish Army of Circassian origin. He served in the Caucasus campaign in WWI, and after the Armistice of Mudros he joined the Turkish National Movement and attended the Sivas Congress.

== Biography ==
He was born in 1883 to a Circassian family. He was from an Ubykh Circassian family known as Therhet (Adyghe: Тхьэрхэт). In 1943 Adolf Hitler invited the Turkish government to an official visit. Army General Toydemir had been assigned by President İnönü to visit Nazi Germany in an official trip. He had visited the Atlantic Wall and Eastern Front. He examined Tiger I tanks with Turkish officers just before Operation Citadel and shared a cigar with Erich von Manstein.

During this trip, he noticed Hitler Youth members, below the age of eighteen, were in uniform. He met Adolf Hitler, Wilhelm Keitel and Alfred Jodl, and during the meeting Hitler stated that Turkey, being the first ones to defy postwar treaties, inspired their movement and compared the well-preparedness of Atlantic wall to Çatalca line (Çatalca line was built to stop any probable German invasion.).

Hitler also claimed that if they did not started Operation Barbarossa in 1941 the Soviet Union would have invaded Europe. Hitler ended the meeting with a prediction that in the future it will only take two hours to fly from Moscow to Berlin. After he came back to Turkey, General Toydemir wrote a report to President İnönü about Germany's military situation. He came to a conclusion that Germany would lose the war.

== Gallery ==
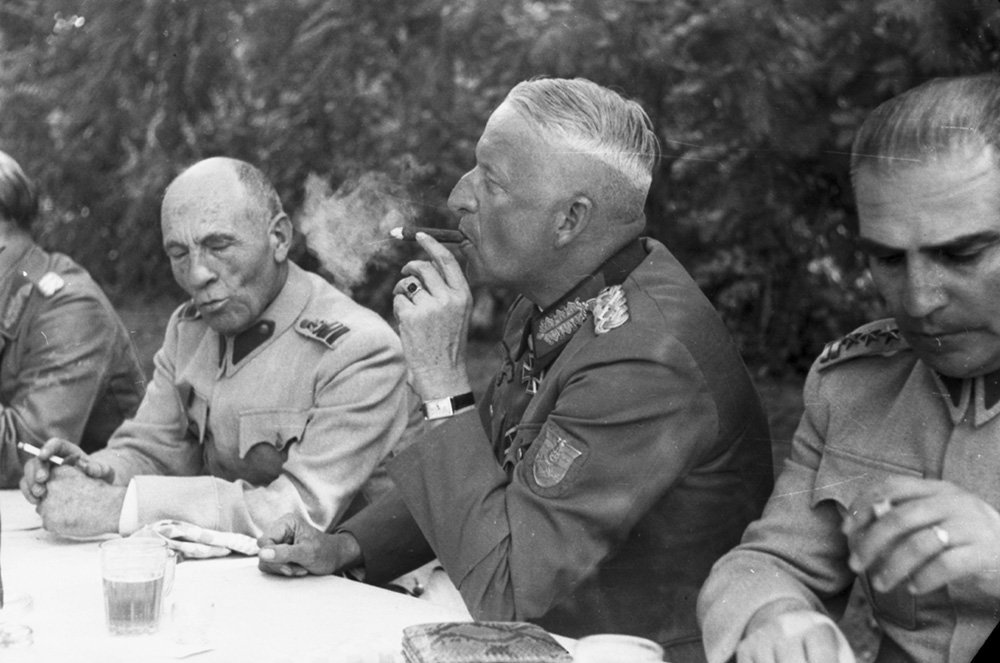
General Toydemir with Field Marshal Erich von Manstein visitng the Eastern Front

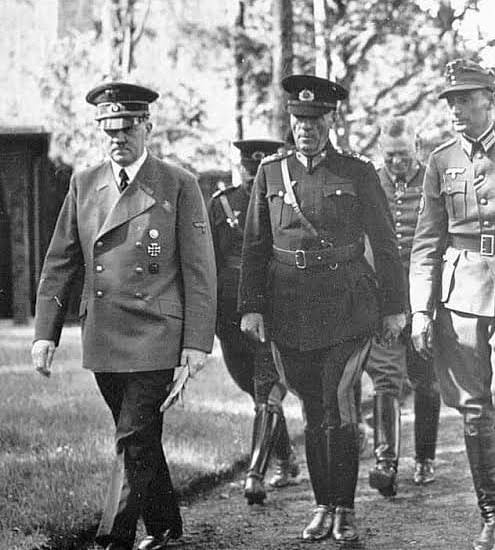
General Toydemir and Adolf Hitler

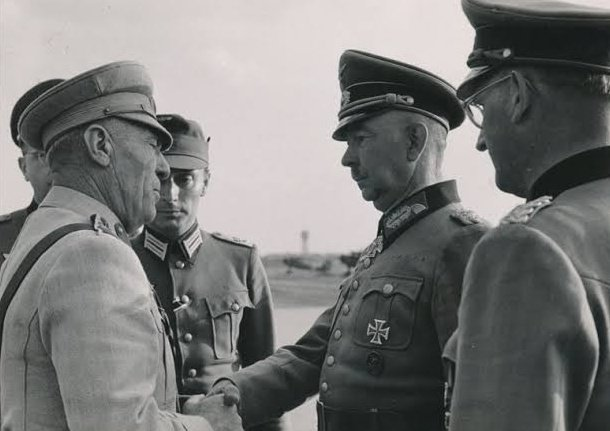
General Toydemir and Werner Kempf

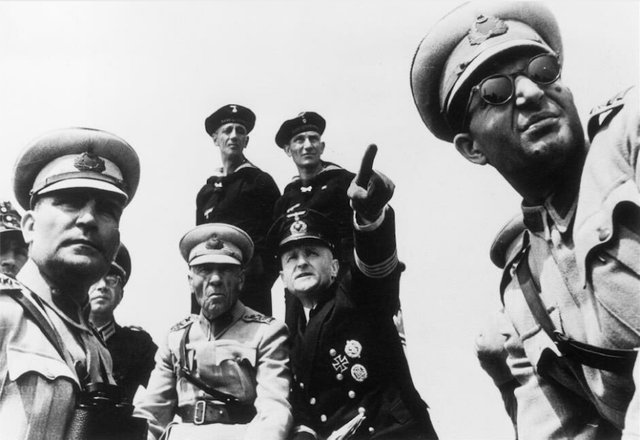
General Toydemir with Grand admiral Karl Dönitz

== See also ==
- List of high-ranking commanders of the Turkish War of Independence
- List of commanders of the First Army of Turkey
- List of general commanders of the Turkish Gendarmerie
- List of ministers of national defense of Turkey

== Sources ==
Military offices
Preceded by Naci Tınaz	General Commanders of Gendarmerie; January 12, 1939–November 21, 1940	Succeeded by Ali Rıza Altunkal
Preceded by Fahrettin Altay	Inspector of the First Army; December 17, 1933–June 15, 1946	Succeeded by Salih Omurtak
