= Kâzım İnanç =

Turkish general (1880–1938)

Kâzım İnanç 1315-P. 29
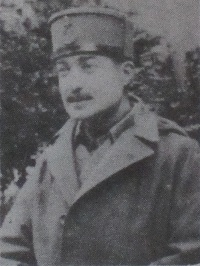
- Born: 1880; Diyarbakır, Diyarbekir Vilayet, Ottoman Empire
- Died: September 21, 1938 (aged 57–58); Ankara, Turkey
- Burial place: State Cemetery
- Military career
- Allegiance: Ottoman Empire; Turkey
- Service years: Ottoman Empire: 1900–1920; Turkey: June 26, 1920 – December 21, 1928
- Rank: General
- Commands: Division of the Intelligence of the First Army, Division of the operations of the First Army, Chief of Staff of the Fifth Army, XIX Corps (deputy), Second Chief of the General Staff; Undersecretary of the Minister of National Defense, Secretariat of Commander-in-chief, VI Corps, IX Corps, Third Army
- Conflicts: Italo-Turkish War; Balkan Wars; First World War; War of Independence
- Other work: Governor of the Samsun Province, Member of the GNAT (İzmir)

Kâzım İnanç (1880 – 21 September 1938) was an officer of the Ottoman Army and a general of the Turkish Army. He was of Kurdish origin.

== See also ==
- List of high-ranking commanders of the Turkish War of Independence

== Sources ==
Military offices
Preceded by Djevat Pasha (Çobanlı)	Inspector of the Third Army; 5 February 1925–22 June 1925	Succeeded by İzzeddin Pasha (Çalışlar)
