= Özalp, Van =

Özalp
- District and municipality
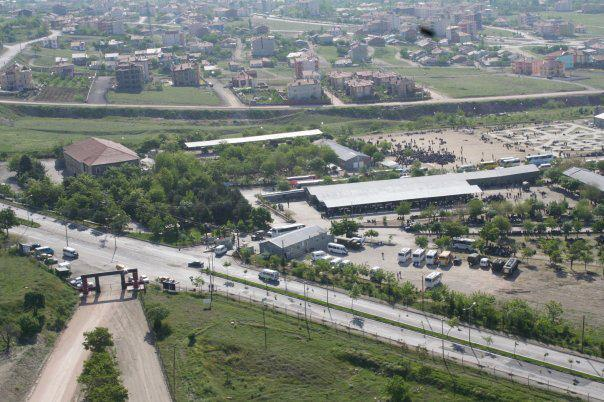

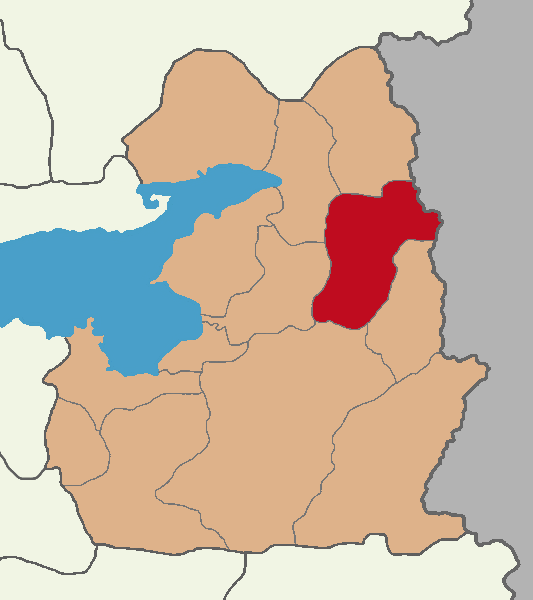
- Map showing Özalp District in Van Province

- Location within Turkey
- Coordinates: 38°39′30″N 43°59′22″E
- Country: Turkey
- Province: Van
- Area: 1,430 km^{2} (550 sq mi)
- Population (2022): 59,851
  - Density: 41.9/km^{2} (108/sq mi)
- Time zone: UTC+3 (TRT)
- Postal code: 65800
- Area code: 0432
- Website: www.ozalp.bel.tr

Özalp (Kurdish: Qerqelî) is a municipality and district of Van Province, Turkey. Its area is 1,430 km^{2}, and its population is 59,851 (2022).

In the local elections of March 2019 Yakup Almaç from the Peoples ' Democratic Party was elected mayor(HDP). Abdulkadir Çelik was appointed Kaymakam by president Recep Tayyip Erdoĝan in August 2019. However Almaç was dismissed in November 2019 and Çelik appointed as well as the trustee of the municipality of Özalp. Following his appointment as a trustee, he dismissed also 28 municipality workers.

== Composition ==
There are 58 neighbourhoods in Özalp District:

- Aksorguç
- Altınboğa
- Aşağıakçagül
- Aşağıbalçıklı
- Aşağıkoçkıran
- Aşağımollahasan
- Aşağıtulgalı
- Aşağıyorganlı
- Bağrıaçık
- Bodurağaç
- Boğazkesen
- Boyaldı
- Çamurlu
- Çavuşlar
- Çırakköy
- Çubuklu
- Cumhuriyet
- Dağdeviren
- Damlacık
- Dönerdere
- Dorutay
- Eğribelen
- Emek
- Eski Emek
- Gözdeğmez
- Gültepe
- Günyüzlü
- Hacıali
- Hacıkışlak
- Hazine
- İstasyon
- Kalecik
- Kargalı
- Karlıyamaç
- Kaşıkara
- Kırkçalı
- Mahmudiye
- Mehmetalan
- Mollatopuz
- Oymaklı
- Sağmalı
- Sarıköy
- Savatlı
- Şehittepe
- Şemsettin
- Seydibey
- Sugeçer
- Tepedam
- Yarımkaya
- Yavuzlar
- Yukarıayazca
- Yukarıbalçıklı
- Yukarıçavdarlık
- Yukarımollahasan
- Yukarıtulgalı
- Yukarıyorganlı
- Yumruklu
- Yürkuşak

== Climate ==
Özalp has a dry-summer humid continental climate (Köppen: Dsb), with very warm, dry summers and very cold, snowy winters.

Climate data for Özalp (1991–2020)
Month	Jan	Feb	Mar	Apr	May	Jun	Jul	Aug	Sep	Oct	Nov	Dec	Year
Mean daily maximum °C (°F)	−2.0 (28.4)	−0.3 (31.5)	5.7 (42.3)	12.9 (55.2)	18.4 (65.1)	24.8 (76.6)	29.6 (85.3)	30.2 (86.4)	25.0 (77.0)	17.3 (63.1)	8.7 (47.7)	1.0 (33.8)	14.4 (57.9)
Daily mean °C (°F)	−9.3 (15.3)	−7.5 (18.5)	−0.8 (30.6)	6.0 (42.8)	11.1 (52.0)	16.3 (61.3)	20.8 (69.4)	20.8 (69.4)	15.4 (59.7)	8.7 (47.7)	1.1 (34.0)	−5.8 (21.6)	6.5 (43.7)
Mean daily minimum °C (°F)	−15.7 (3.7)	−13.9 (7.0)	−6.5 (20.3)	−0.2 (31.6)	3.7 (38.7)	7.1 (44.8)	11.7 (53.1)	11.2 (52.2)	5.6 (42.1)	1.2 (34.2)	−4.8 (23.4)	−11.6 (11.1)	−1.0 (30.2)
Average precipitation mm (inches)	44.71 (1.76)	42.56 (1.68)	49.88 (1.96)	68.55 (2.70)	69.53 (2.74)	33.21 (1.31)	21.98 (0.87)	10.98 (0.43)	11.65 (0.46)	37.11 (1.46)	46.34 (1.82)	44.3 (1.74)	480.8 (18.93)
Average precipitation days (≥ 1.0 mm)	7.0	7.3	8.6	10.3	9.9	5.7	4.0	2.9	2.5	5.8	7.1	7.4	78.5
Average relative humidity (%)	74.3	74.7	71.1	63.1	58.0	49.4	44.0	41.8	47.2	60.6	69.3	73.9	60.6
Source: NOAA

== See also ==
- Muğlalı incident
