= Teymur bey Novruzov =

Imperial Russian and Azerbaijani military commander

- Azerbaijani: Teymur bəy Mirzə Hacı bəy oğlu Novruzov
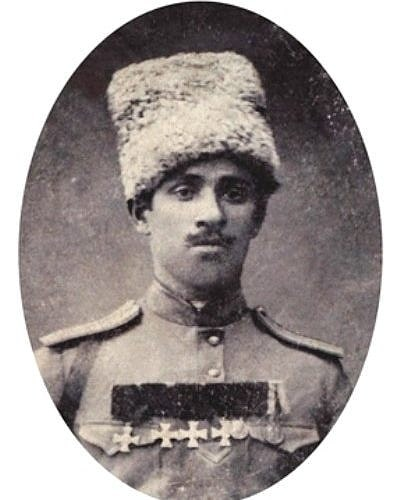
- Born: Teymur bey Mirza Hajı bey oglu Novruzov; April 20, 1880; Qovlar, Elizavetpol uezd, Elisabethpol Governorate, Russian Empire
- Died: June 30, 1961 (aged 81); Nice, France
- Military career
- Allegiance: Russian Empire (from 1898 to 1918); Azerbaijan Democratic Republic (from 1918 to 1920)
- Service years: 1898 – 1920
- Rank: (Russian Empire) Colonel of The Imperial Russian Army (from 1898 to 1918), General of The National Army of Azerbaijan Democratic Republic (from 1918 to 1920)
- Conflicts: First World War; 1920 Ganja revolt
- Awards: 2nd Class Order of Saint Anne 3rd Class Order of Saint Anne 2nd Class Ode of Saint Stanislaus 3rd Class Ode of Saint Stanislaus

Teymur bey Novruzov (Azerbaijani: Teymur bəy Npvruzov, born April 20, 1880, Qovlar, Elizavetpol uezd, Elisabethpol Governorate, Russian Empire – died 1961, Nice, France) was a decorated Imperial Russian and Azerbaijani military commander, having the rank of major-general.

His father Mirza Haji bey Novruzov was also general.

== Life ==
He was born in 1880 in Qovlar village of the Elizavetpol uezd in the Russian Empire. He received general education in the Tbilisi Cadet Corpus.

He began his military service in 1898. He promoted from the rank of soldier to the rank of major general. After the collapse of the Russian Empire, he joined the army of the Azerbaijan Democratic Republic. He was promoted to the rank of major general by the Democratic Republic of Azerbaijan on 2 August 1919.

After occupation of Azerbaijan by Bolsheviks, he was one of the organizers of the Ganja revolt. He emigrated to Germany because of suppression of revolt.

He died in Nice in 1961.
