= Nuri Berköz =

Mehmed Nuri Berköz (1889–1975) (Muhammed Haji Ilyas oghlu Sarikerimli) was an Ottoman/Turkish Army soldier.

He was born in Shaki, Azerbaijan in 1889. After completing his primary education in the local Russian-Tatar School, (educational institutions which are considered to have contributed to the rise of modern Azerbaijani intelligentsia) his father decided to immigrate to Ottoman Turkey with his family in early twentieth century. Upon the death of his father a while after their arrival at Bursa, he and his younger brother Mahmud first enrolled with the Bursa Military Junior High School (Bursa Askerî Rüştiyesi ), then Bursa Military High School (today Işıklar Military Air Force High School, Işıklar Askerî Hava Lisesi).

After graduating from Işıklar, he was admitted in 1909 to the Ottoman Military Academy in Istanbul, and graduated from this distinguished institution as a young infantry lieutenant in 1912.

At the outset of the First World War, he was first sent to the eastern front to join the Second Caucasus Corps. As he spoke fluent Russian, however, after a while it was considered more appropriate to employ his capabilities not at the battlefront, but elsewhere. He was first sent to Iranian Azerbaijan on a special mission, then in 1916, to Denmark and Sweden. Between 1917 and 1918, during the revolution years in Russia, he was stationed in Saint Petersburg (then Petrograd) and later in Moscow as a member of the special commission dispatched for the exchange of Ottoman-Russian Prisoners of War.

When the First World War ended, he returned to Turkey (being raised to the rank of captain) and enrolled with the Ottoman Military College in Istanbul in 1919. As the Turkish War of Independence started, he and his brother Mahmud interrupted their education at the Military College and rushed to Anatolia to join Mustafa Kemal Atatürk's forces.

During the Independence War, he served on the western front. After the victory, he completed the remaining part of his education at the War College and graduated as a staff officer with the rank of major. In 1930 he was promoted to the rank of lieutenant colonel and between 1932 and 1933 served in Geneva, Switzerland as the military adviser to the Turkish delegation attending to the first World Disarmament Conference organized by the League of Nations. In 1933, he was promoted to the rank of colonel and was chosen to accompany the Soviet delegation (which included Marshal Kliment Voroshilov and Marshal Semyon Budyonny) invited to attend the 10th anniversary celebrations of the young Turkish Republic.

In 1935, he attended military maneuvers in Kiev, Ukraine as the chief of staff of the Turkish Military Delegation and between 1936-1937 was sent to Moscow as the Turkish Military Attaché. Over all these years, he knew many prominent Soviet military and political figures of that period in person.

He was promoted to the rank of Brigadier General on August 30, 1939, and to Major General on August 30, 1941. He was appointed to the Commander of the 53rd Border Division in Doğubayazıt, to the Commander of the 57th Division in Bornova in 1943, and to the Commander of the 12th Corps (Turkey) in İzmir in 1945. He served as a division commander for four years on the eastern border of Turkey during the Second World War. He was promoted to the rank of lieutenant general in 1946. In 1947, he became the Operational Deputy Chief of the Turkish General Staff. When he retired in 1950, he was the General commander of Gendarmerie. Lt. General Berköz died in 1975. His decorations included War Medal, Silver Order of Merit, Medal of Independence (Istiklal Madalyasi) etc.

Besides Russian, he spoke French and some Swedish. Along his military career, he was also deeply interested in history, Russian literature and Turkic languages. Because of his interest in Turkic languages, he was invited to join the special committee set by Turkish Language Association to translate Edouard K. Pekarski's Yakut-Russian dictionary into Turkish. Apart from this, he authored and translated from Russian a number of military books and wrote newspaper articles on military and strategic issues.

== See also ==
- Baba Behbud
- Cahangir bey Novruzov

== Sources ==
Preceded by	Commander, 12 Corps; 1945-c.1947	Succeeded by
Military offices
Preceded by	Deputy Chief of Staff for Operations, Turkish General Staff	Succeeded by
Preceded by Şükrü Kanatlı	General Commanders of Gendarmerie; March 29, 1949–June 28, 1950	Succeeded by Kemal Yaşınkılıç
