= İzzettin Çalışlar =

Turkish Army general

İzzettin Çalışlar 1319-Top. 13
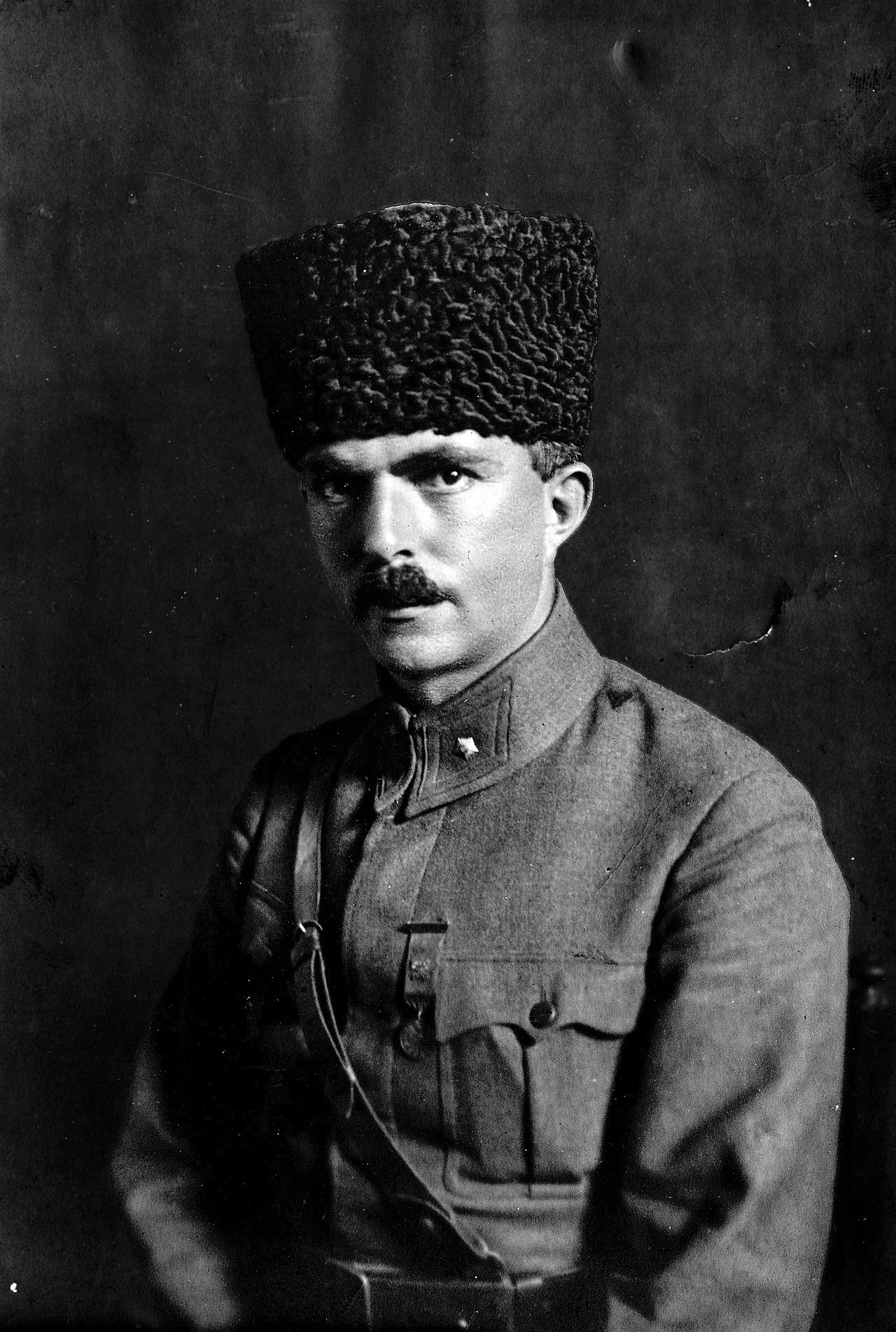
- İzzettin Çalışlar during the Turkish War of Independence
- Born: 1882; Yanya (Ioannina), Janina Vilayet, Ottoman Empire (modern Greece)
- Died: 20 August 1951 (aged 68–69); Istanbul, Turkey
- Burial place: Edirnekapı Şehitliği; State Cemetery
- Military career
- Allegiance: Ottoman Empire; Turkey
- Service years: Ottoman: 1903–1920; Turkey: 1 July 1920 – 20 December 1939
- Rank: General
- Commands: Chief of Staff of Edirne Kalesi Command, Chief of Staff of the 19th Division, Chief of Staff of the XVI Corps, Chief of Staff of the Anafartalar Group, Chief of Staff of the Second Army, 4th division of the General headquarters XX Corps (deputy), 23rd Division, 61st Division, 1st Group, I Corps, Military Governor of the İzmir Province, Third Army, Second Army
- Conflicts: Balkan Wars; First World War; Turkish War of Independence
- Other work: Member of the GNAT (Aydın); Member of the GNAT (Muğla); Member of the GNAT (Balıkesir)

İzzettin Çalışlar (1882 – 20 August 1951) was an officer of the Ottoman Army and a general of the Turkish Army. He is known for his achievements in the Gallipoli campaign of World War I. He later joined the forces of Mustafa Kemal and fought in the Turkish War of Independence. He also served as a politician and was a prominent member of the Kemalist movement.

== Works ==
- İstiklâl Harbi Hatıraları
- II nci İnönü Muharebesinde 61 nci Fırka, 1932.
- 61 nci Fırkanın Gediz ve Kütahya Muharebeleri, 1932.
- Sakarya Meydan Muharebesinde 1 nci Grup, 1932.
- Sakarya'dan İzmir'e kadar I inci Kolordu, 1932.
- İzzettin Çalışlar (ed. İsmet Görgülü), Atatürk'le İkibuçuk Yıl – Orgeneral Çalışlar'ın anıları, Yapı Kredi Yayınları, 1993.
- İzzettin Çalışlar (ed.: İsmet Görgülü), On Yıllık Savaşın Günlüğü: Balkan, Birinci Dünya ve İstiklal Savaşları, Yapı Kredi Yayınları, 1997, ISBN 975-363-617-2.
- İzzettin Çalışlar, Gün Gün, Saat Saat İstiklâl Harbi'nde Batı Cephesi: Org. İzzetin Çalışlar'ın Anılarıyla, Türkiye İş Bankası Kültür Yayınları, 2009, ISBN 978-9944-88-554-6.

== See also ==
- List of high-ranking commanders of the Turkish War of Independence

== Sources ==
Military offices
Preceded by Kâzım Pasha (İnanç)	Inspector of the Third Army; 22 June 1925 – 22 November 1933	Succeeded by Ali Sait Akbaytogan
Preceded by Fahreddin Pasha (Altay)	Inspector of the Second Army; 22 November 1933 – 20 December 1939	Succeeded by Abdurrahman Nafiz Gürman
