= Muğlalı incident =

1943 massacre of Kurds in Turkey

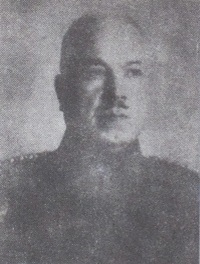
Mustafa Muğlalı

The Muğlalı incident, also known as the 33 Bullet incident, was a massacre that resulted in the deaths of 32 Kurdish and Küresünni civilians in July 1943, in Özalp, Van. They were executed for alleged animal smuggling on the orders of the 3rd Army Commander General Mustafa Muğlalı.

== Incident ==
During World War II, smuggling incidents increased, especially on the Iranian border. One of these incidents, which led to clashes between the tribes in the region and the security forces, broke out in the Özalp district of Van. Gendarmerie units sent to the border upon a tip that the Milan tribe, some of whom live on Iranian territory, abducted a large herd of animals in July 1943, could not catch the smugglers because they fled to Iran. Then, 40 relatives of the tribe living in Özalp were detained. Although the court arrested only 5 people and released the rest, 33 people were handed over to a military unit under the command of two second lieutenants for questioning, by order of Mustafa Muğlalı, who came to Özalp. The smugglers were shot near the border, and it was claimed that they were shot while trying to escape, based on a report prepared earlier. Even though a villager who survived the incident with injuries managed to announce the situation to the relevant authorities, no results could be obtained from the applications made.

With the Democrat Party becoming an effective opposition party, the incident that was tried to be covered up was brought up again in 1948. Upon the adoption of a parliamentary question submitted to the Presidency of the Grand National Assembly of Turkey, an investigation was launched against the military and civilian administrators regarding the incident. Muğlalı, who said that he gave the order for the shooting in the case where all the defendants were held in pre-trial detention at the General Staff Military Court, was sentenced to death on March 2, 1950, and then to 20 years in prison due to his advanced age and extenuating circumstances. But the military supreme court overturned the decision; Muğlalı died in prison on 11 December 1951 (at the age of 69) before the new trial started. Upon the CHP's claim that "discrimination was made against minorities" during the Istanbul pogrom, the incident was brought up again in the Parliament as a retaliation by the Democratic Party. This time, all the members of the Grand National Assembly of Turkey and the CHP at the time of the incident were allegedly responsible, and İsmet İnönü was tried for himself. The issue, which was discussed in the Assembly on February 12, 1956, and February 25, 1956, was closed again due to the statute of limitations and various amnesty laws, with the 1958 Parliamentary Investigation Commission report and Parliamentary deliberations.
