= Fahrettin Altay =

Turkish Army general

Fahrettin Altay 1315-P. 1
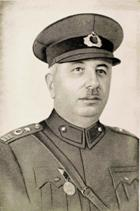
- Born: 20 January 1880; Shkodër, Scutari Vilayet, Ottoman Empire (now Albania)
- Died: 25 October 1974 (aged 94); Istanbul, Turkey
- Burial place: Turkish State Cemetery
- Military career
- Allegiance: Ottoman Empire (1902–1920); Turkey (1920–1945)
- Branch: Ottoman Army; Turkish Land Forces
- Service years: 1902–1945
- Rank: Orgeneral
- Commands: Chief of Staff of the III Corps, Deputy undersecretary of the Ministry of War, 6th Division, 26th Division, XV Corps (deputy), 26th Division, XII Corps, III Corps; XII Corps, V Cavalry Group, V Cavalry Corps, First Army (deputy), V Corps, Second Army, First Army, member of the Supreme Military Council
- Conflicts: Balkan Wars: World War I; Gallipoli campaign; Romanian campaign (1916); Sinai and Palestine campaign; Turkish War of Independence; Battle of Aslıhanlar–Dumlupınar; Battle of Dumlupınar; Turkish capture of Smyrna
- Other work: Member of the Grand National Assembly of Turkey (TBMM) from Mersin

Fahrettin Altay (12 January 1880 – 25 October 1974) was a Turkish military officer. His surname "Altay" (Red horse/colt) was given to him by Atatürk. The Turkish tank Altay is named in honor of him.

== Biography ==
Fahrettin Altay was born to Lieutenant Colonel İsmail Bey, son of Hacı Ahmet Efendi from İzmir and Hayriye Hanım, the daughter of Lieutenant Colonel İbrahim Bey in Shkodër in Scutari Vilayet (now Albania). His father rose to the rank of lieutenant colonel from being a captain at his arrival, by gaining fame in the wars he fought against Malësors and Montenegrins in the Shkodër region. He traces his roots to İzmir and states that his great-grandfather was Ömer Ağa the son of the "Urlalı" and states that his parents were married in Monastir. He married with Münime Hanım, the daughter of Tahir Paşa from the Bibezik family of Podgorica in 1912 in Istanbul. They were married for 62 years and had two children and two grandchildren. He graduated from the Ottoman Military College in Istanbul.

When World War I started, he was the 3rd Corps Chief of Staff. He met future President of Turkey Mustafa Kemal while serving on the Dardanelles Front. In 1915, he was appointed Deputy Undersecretary of the Ministry of War and was promoted to the rank of Miralay in the same year. Shortly after serving in the Romanian Front, he was sent as commander of the Palestinian Front. After the defeat in Palestine, the 12th Corps headquarters was moved to the city of Konya where he served as 12th Corps commander to the end of the war.

During the Turkish War of Independence, Altay served as commander of the V. Cavalry Corps. He fought and lost in the Battle of Aslıhanlar–Dumlupınar. Perhaps his most famous exploit during his leadership of the V. Cavalry Corps was the famous Battle of Dumlupınar, where the V. Cavalry Corps passed behind the Greek lines at the beginning of the battle. His cavalry cut Greek supply and communication. They raised havoc among the retreating Greek troops and also captured General Nikolaos Trikoupis, CO of Greek forces in Anatolia. In the Great Smyrna Offensive, V Cavalry Corps was one of the offensive vanguards of the Turkish Army.

According to Altay Spor Tarihi ("The History of Altay Sports Club"), in 1966 when Fahrettin Altay visited the Altay Sports Club at İzmir, he explained to Erdoğan Tözge how his surname was given. According to Erdoğan Tözge, he presented a gold fountain pen to Fahrettin Altay and asked him how he chose Altay as his surname. Fahrettin Altay replied, When we visited Izmir with Gazi Mustafa Kemal Pasha during the years of armistice, the Altay club played football against a mixed team consisting of Royal Navy personnel. We watched the game together. Altay club played very well and when they won against the British, Gazi Mustafa Kemal Pasha was affected, honored, and expressed his appreciation. After a long time had passed, Gazi Mustafa Kemal Pasha sent me to Tabriz to settle a border dispute with Iran. During my stay at Tabriz, the Surname Law was adopted in the Grand National Assembly, and the Assembly gave the name Atatürk to Gazi Mustafa Kemal Pasha unanimously. All the country congratulated him because of his new surname. I also sent a telegraph and celebrated. Atatürk's response that he received the next day, was:

Dear Fahrettin Altay Pasha, I also congratulate you and wish you honorable and glorious days as Altay.

— Turkish original, Sayın Fahrettin Altay Paşa, Ben de seni tebrik eder Altay gibi şanlı şerefli günler dilerim.

Afterwards, Fahrettin said, "My eyes were full with tears when I received the telegram. Atatürk deemed me worthy of surname Altay for the memory of the football match of Altay that we had watched together and he had been affected."

In 1933-35 Altay was chosen by Afghanistan and Iran to demarcate the middle section of their common boundary.

He retired from the army in 1945. Between 1946 and 1950 he served as a deputy for the CHP from Burdur. After 1946 he retired from political life. In the early 1950s he was one of the contributors of the history magazine Tarih Dünyası. He died in Istanbul in 1974.

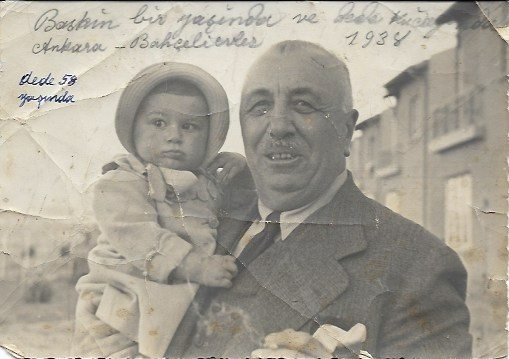
General Fahrettin Altay and his 1-year-old grandson, Baskın Sokulluoglu in Ankara-Bahçelievler in 1938.

== See also ==
- List of high-ranking commanders of the Turkish War of Independence
- List of commanders of the First Army of Turkey
- Altay S.K.

== Sources ==
Military offices
Preceded by Ali Fuat Cebesoy	Inspector of the Second Army; 31 October 1924 – 21 November 1933	Succeeded by İzzettin Çalışlar
Preceded by Ali Sait Akbaytogan	Inspector of the First Army; 22 November 1933 – 19 December 1943	Succeeded by Cemil Cahit Toydemir
