= Feyzi Mengüç =

9th Chief of the General Staff of the Turkish Armed Forces from 1957 to 1958

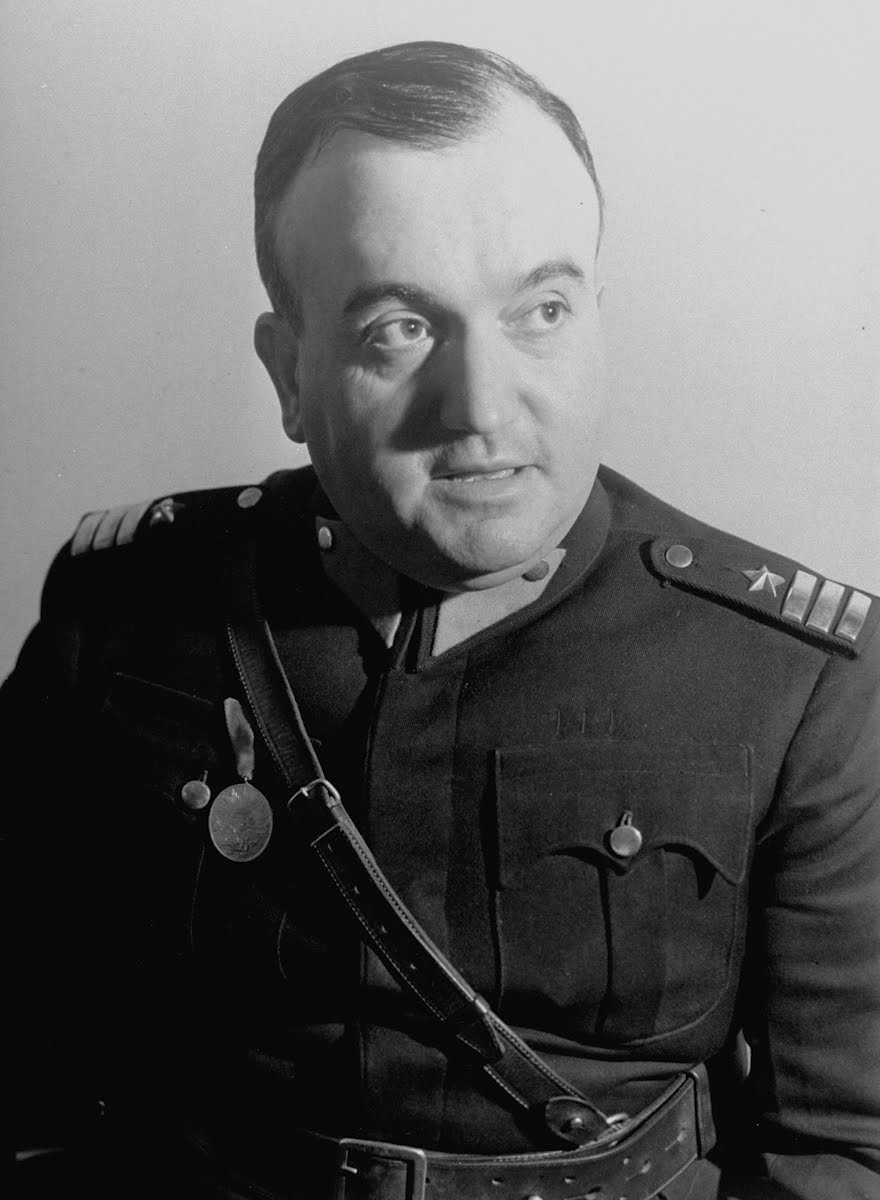

9th Chief of the Turkish General Staff
- In office 11 October 1957 – 22 August 1958
- Preceded by: Hakkı Tunaboylu
- Succeeded by: Rüştü Erdelhun

Personal details
- Born: 1894 Constantinople, Ottoman Empire
- Died: 23 June 1966 (aged 72) Istanbul, Turkey

Military service
- Allegiance: Ottoman Empire (1914–1921); Turkey (1921–1959)
- Branch/service: (Ottoman Empire) Ottoman Army; Turkish Land Forces
- Years of service: 1914–1959 (46 years)
- Rank: General
- Battles/wars: World War I Turkish War of Independence

Feyzi Mengüç (1894 – 23 June 1966) was a Turkish military officer. He was the 9th Chief of the General Staff of Turkey.

== Career ==
He graduated from the Turkish Military Academy and served as combat engineer officer during World War I. He joined the war effort for the Turkish War of Independence on 31 July 1921.

After graduating from the Army War College in 1925, he served in various commands till 1939, including command of the 172nd Infantry Regiment.

In 1939, Brigadier General, Major-General in 1941, as acting and then permanent commander of the 15th Infantry Division of the 8th Corps (Turkey). He was promoted to Lieutenant General in 1947, serving as commander of the 7th Corps, and was promoted to the rank of General in 1953. While in this rank he was appointed as the head of the Military Supreme Court.

He served as acting Chief of General Staff between 11 October 1957 and 22 August May 1958.

He retired from his duties on 15 December 1959.
