= 2nd Corps (Turkey) =

- Founded: 1911
- Country: Turkey
- Branch: Turkish Army
- Type: Infantry
- Size: Corps
- Part of: First Army
- Garrison/HQ: Gelibolu, Çanakkale

Commanders
- Lieutenant general: Mustafa Oğuz
- Notable commanders: Selahattin Adil; Ali Hikmet Ayerdem; Engin Alan; Zekai Aksakallı

The 2nd Corps (Turkish: 2. Kolordu) is a field corps of the Turkish Army. It is headquartered at Gelibolu in Çanakkale Province, and is part of the First Army (Turkey). In 2013 it appeared to be under command of Major General Mustafa Oğuz.

After the founding of Turkey in the early 1920s, the protection of the fortified position on the Dardanelles was entrusted to the 1st Corps, based in Çanakkale. The 2nd Corps, based in Gallipoli, defended the Gallipoli Peninsula against land attacks. The 1st Corps was abolished in 1947, and the Dardanelles Fortified Area Command was abolished in 1949. Since then, the Dardanelles Strait Command, part of the Turkish Navy, has guarded the position.

In 1941, it appears to have been part of the Second Army's Dardanelles and Marmara Area, and had its headquarters at Gelibolu with the 4th Infantry Division, the 69th Infantry Division, the 32nd Infantry Division, the 66th Mechanized Infantry Division, and the 72nd Infantry Brigade.

In 1943, Nuri Yamut, a career Artillery officer, was appointed to the 2nd Corps Command in Gallipoli. In 1947 initial U.S. reports on assistance to Turkey said the corps comprised the 4th Infantry Division and the 66th and 69th Divisions, within Second Army.

By 1974 it was a part of the First Army (Turkey).

The 8th Division appears to have served with the corps for several decades. The 131st Infantry Regiment was garrisoned at the Hayrabolu barracks for several decades prior to the 1992-93 reorganization. During that reorganiszation the 8th Infantry Division was inactivated, and the 95th Armoured Brigade (95. Zırhlı Tugayı) was established. The new brigade had two primary sites in Tekirdağ Province: the tank battalions and the headquarters at Malkara, while the original garrison infrastructure in Hayrabolu was repurposed to house the 95th Armoured Brigade Deputy Command (95. Zırhlı Tugay Komutan Yardımcılığı).

In 2004, Lale Sarıibrahimoğlu reported that the corps consisted of the:

- Corps Headquarters (Gelibolu)
  - 4th Mechanized Infantry Brigade (Keşan)
  - 8th Mechanized Infantry Brigade (Tekirdağ)
  - 18th Mechanized Infantry Brigade (Gelibolu)
  - 95th Armored Brigade (Malkara)

In the mid-2020s the corps appeared to include the 4th Mechanized Infantry Brigade based at Keşan, the 8th Mechanized Infantry Brigade based at Tekirdağ, and the 18th Mechanized Infantry Brigade at Ortaköy, a military installation in tr:Kavakköy on the Gallipoli Peninsula. It also included the 95th Armored Brigade at Malkara, the 5th Commando Brigade (upgraded from a regiment, and commonly referred to as the Rüzgâr Alayı or Wind Regiment) deployed on the frontier island of Gökçeada, and the 102nd Artillery Regiment stationed in Uzunköprü.

The 2nd Corps Engineer Combat Regiment (2. Kolordu İstihkam Savaş Alayı) routinely provides amphibious bridging units during exercises.
