= Qovlar =

Town in Tovuz District, Azerbaijan

- Municipality
- Location within Azerbaijan
- Coordinates: 40°56′31″N 45°44′09″E
- Country: Azerbaijan
- Rayon: Tovuz

Population (2008)
  - Total: 13,642
- Time zone: UTC+4 (AZT)
  - Summer (DST): UTC+5 (AZT)

Qovlar (also, Kovlar, Kovlyar, and Koylyar) is a town and the most populous municipality, except for the capital Tovuz, in the Tovuz Rayon of Azerbaijan. It has a population of 13,642.
