= Kâzım Orbay =

3rd Chief of the General Staff of the Turkish Armed Forces from 1944 to 1946

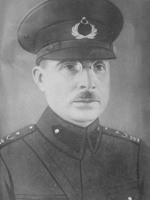
- Born: 11 March 1887; Smyrna (modern-day İzmir), Ottoman Empire
- Died: 3 June 1964 (aged 77); Istanbul, Turkey
- Burial place: Zincirlikuyu Mezarlığı; Transferred to Turkish State Cemetery
- Education: Imperial School of Military Engineering
- Military career
- Allegiance: Ottoman Empire; Turkey
- Branch: (Ottoman Empire) Ottoman Army; Turkish Land Forces
- Service years: 11 December 1904-6 July 1950
- Rank: General
- Commands: 3rd Caucasian Division; Second Chief of the General Staff; 4th Corps; General Commander of Gendarmerie; Third Army; Member of the Supreme Military Council; Deputy Chief of the General Staff; Chief of the General Staff; Member of the Supreme Military Council
- Conflicts: Balkan Wars; First World War; Turkish War of Independence; Dersim Rebellion
- Other work: President of the Constituent Assembly; senator

Signature
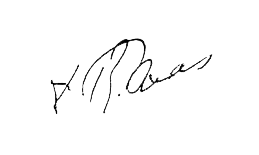

Mehmet Kâzım Orbay (11 March 1887 – 3 June 1964) was a Turkish general and Speaker of the house. He served as the 3rd Chief of the General Staff of the Turkish Armed Forces.

== Biography ==
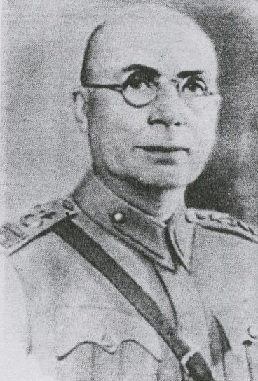
Kâzım Orbay in the 1930s

Kâzım Orbay was born in Smyrna (modern-day İzmir), Ottoman Empire in 1887. He graduated from Mühendishâne-i Berrî-i Hümâyûn (Imperial School of Military Engineering) and joined the army in the rank of an artillery lieutenant in 1904. After finishing the Staff College in 1907, he became a staff officer. In 1908, he attended military courses in Germany. In 1912–1913, he fought in the Balkan Wars. He was appointed chief adjutant of the Ministry of War in the Ottoman cabinet and served under Enver Pasha during World War I. In 1915, he was the Ottoman representative in the Niedermayer–Hentig Expedition to Afghanistan. He presented to Emir Habibullah Khan the Ottoman Sultan's declaration of jihad: a call to all Islamic peoples (including Afghanistan) to join the Central Powers and attack the Allies. Afghanistan was to attack British India starting from the city of Peshawar however this plan never came into effect.

After the defeat of the Ottoman Empire, he joined the Turkish National Movement in Anatolia. During the Turkish War of Independence, he held commanding positions in the Eastern Front Army between 1920 and 1922, fighting in the Caucasus. He also took part in the Battle of Dumlupınar in western Anatolia against the invading Greek Army. On August 31, 1922, he was promoted to the rank of Mirliva. As Mirliva, he served as Commander of the 3rd Caucasian Division and Deputy Chief of the General Staff.

On August 30, 1926, he was promoted to Korgeneral, then known as Ferîk, and appointed vice chief of the general staff. During 1928 and 1929, Kâzım Orbay served as Chief of the General Staff of the army of Afghanistan. Following his return to Turkey, he held high-ranking military posts, including Commander of the 4th Corps; in 1935, he was promoted to Orgeneral.

Succeeding Fevzi Çakmak, he served as Chief of the General Staff of the Turkish Armed Forces from 12 January 1944 to 23 July 1946, when he resigned.

Kâzım Orbay retired on 6 July 1950. After the 1960 Turkish coup d'état, he was elected senator in 1961 and served as the president of the parliament.

He died of stomach cancer in Ankara and was laid to rest in the Turkish State Cemetery.

He was married to Mediha Hanım, sister of Enver Pasha, and they had a son named Haşmet. On 16 October 1945, Haşmet Orbay murdered physician Naci Arzan. The investigation of the Ankara Murder turned into a political scandal involving the Republican People's Party (CHP) apparatus.

== See also ==
- List of high-ranking commanders of the Turkish War of Independence

Military offices
| Preceded by Ahmet Zeki Soydemir | General Commander of Gendarmerie; 30 July 1930 – 24 August 1935 | Succeeded by Naci Tınaz |
| Preceded by Ali Sait Akbaytogan | Inspector of the Third Army; 3 September 1935 – 5 March 1943 | Succeeded by Mustafa Muğlalı |
| Preceded by Fevzi Çakmak | Chief of the General Staff of Turkey; 12 January 1944 – 30 July 1946 | Succeeded by Salih Omurtak |
Political offices
| Preceded by Refik Koraltan | President of the Constituent Assembly of Turkey; 9 January 1961 – 26 October 1961 | Succeeded by Fuat Sirmen |
