= 3rd Corps (Turkey) =

Turkish army unit

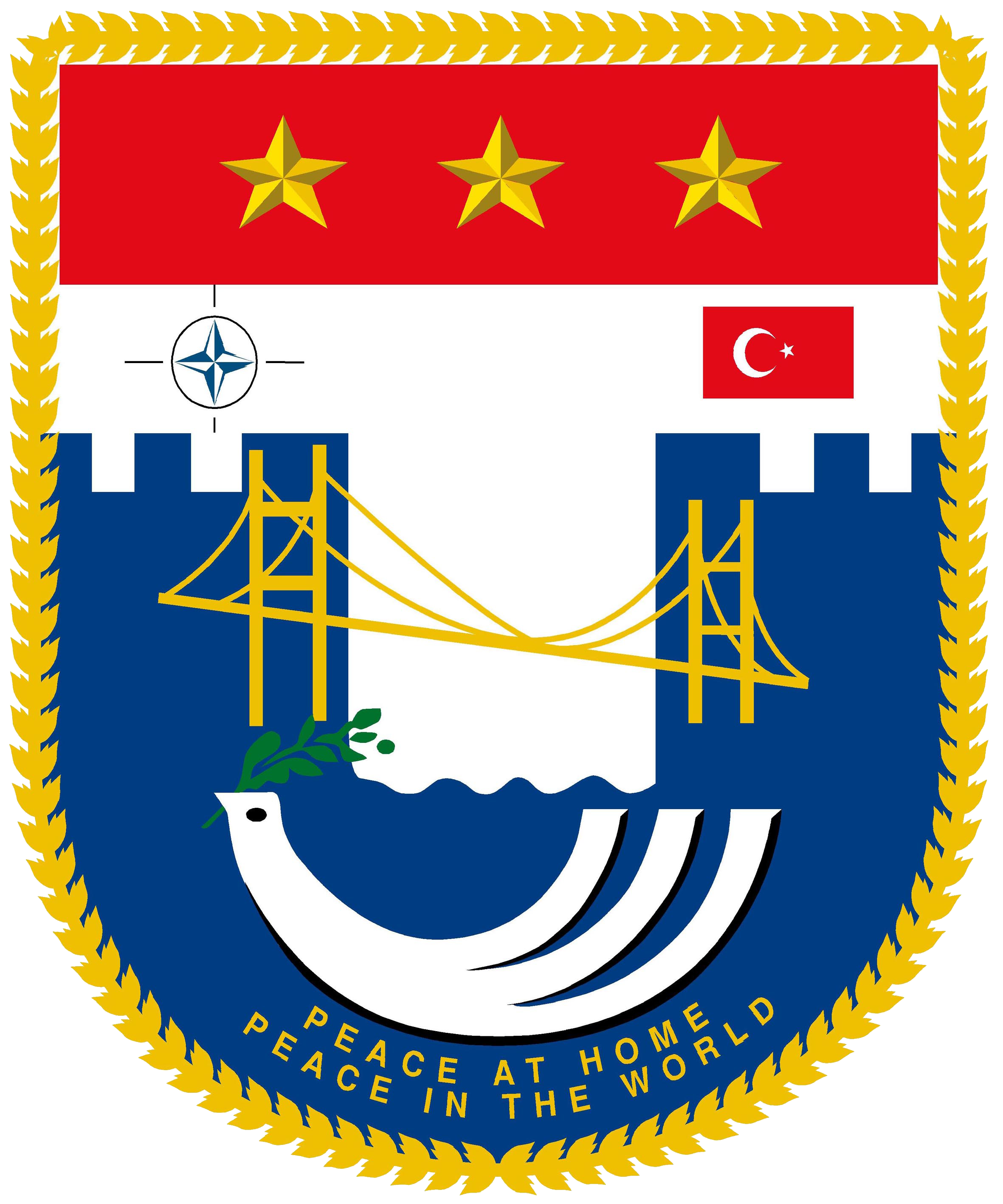
- Founded: 1911
- Country: Ottoman Empire, Turkey
- Branch: Turkish Army
- Type: Infantry
- Size: Corps
- Part of: First Army
- Garrison/HQ: Ayazağa, Sarıyer, Istanbul
- Engagements: Balkan Wars: First Balkan War (1912–1913); Second Balkan War (1913); World War I: Gallipoli Campaign (1915–1916); Caucasus Campaign (1916–1917); Palestine Campaign (1917–1918); Turkish War of Independence: Battle of Kütahya–Eskişehir (1921); Battle of Sakarya (1921); Battle of Dumlupınar (1922)

Commanders
- Commander: Lt. Gen. Levent Ergün
- Deputy Commander: Maj. Gen. Mircea Gologan
- Chief of Staff: Brig. Gen. Tolga Genç
- Notable commanders: Mehmet Esat Bülkat (1862–1952); Refet Bele (1877–1967); Fahrettin Altay (1880–1974)

The 3rd Corps (Turkish: 3. Kolordu Komutanlığı) is a field corps of the Turkish Army and the NATO Rapid Deployable Corps — Türkiye (NRDC-T). Headquartered at Ayazaga, Sarıyer in Istanbul, it is part of the First Army. It was established at Kirklareli on March 14, 1911, as the 3. Corps (3. Kolordu) in the Ottoman Empire. It took part in the First Balkan War, the Second Balkan War, the Gallipoli Campaign, operations in the Caucasus 1916–1917, and operations in Palestine in 1918.

It then took part in the Battles of Kutahya-Eskişehir and Sakarya in 1921, and the Battle of Dumlupınar and the Great Offensive of 1922, during the Turkish War of Independence.

Under Şükrü Naili Gökberk, 3rd Corps entered Istanbul with a ceremony on 6 October 1923, following the end of the city's occupation by the Allies of World War I.

In 1923 the corps included the 1st Division and the 6th Division, under the First Army Troops Inspectorate.

In 1941, the corps, as part of First Army, Catalca Area, with its headquarters at Çorlu, comprised 1st Infantry Division, 61st Infantry Division, 46th Infantry Division, and 62nd Infantry Division.

In 1947 initial U.S. reports on assistance to Turkey said the corps comprised the 7th Division, 46th Division, and 61st Division, within First Army.

In August 1966, the corps headquarters was relocated to the former Military Academy building in Istanbul. On April 27, 1973, it moved to its current location in the Ayazağa neighborhood of Sarıyer.

== NATO Response Force ==
The corps received in 2001 orders from the General Staff for its transformation into a NATO Response Force Corps, which is a high-readiness, joint, multinational force that is technologically advanced, flexible, deployable, interoperable and sustainable. The process was completed in 2003, and it became one of the seven dedicated units of NATO. It was named NATO Rapid Deployable Corps — Türkiye, abbreviated as NRDC-T. As a NATO Rapidly Deployable Corps, it is responsible to the Supreme Allied Commander Europe.

Between October 2003 and July 2004, it was assigned as NRF 1 and NRF 2, and between January–June 2007 as NRF 8.

The commander of the corps, Lt. General Ethem Erdağı was assigned as commander of International Security Assistance Force (ISAF) headquarters in Afghanistan between February and August 2005. The corps was assigned to the ISAF in Afghanistan between August 2008 and February 2009 as well.

== Subordinate units ==
- 52nd Tactical Armored Division (Hadımköy, Istanbul)
  - 2nd Armored Brigade (Kartal)
  - 3rd Armored Brigade (Çerkezköy) - seemingly 2016 coup attempt revealed 3rd Armd Bde was part of 52nd Division
  - 66th Mechanized Infantry Brigade (Istanbul)
- 23rd Tactical Motorised Infantry Division (Hasdal, Istanbul)
  - 6th Motorized Infantry Regiment (Hasdal, Istanbul) - existed as a division until at least 1992. Recep Tayyip Erdoğan reportedly did his military service with the 77th Infantry Regiment of the 6th Infantry Division.
  - 23rd Motorized Infantry Regiment (Samandıra, Istanbul)
  - 47th Motorized Infantry Regiment (Metris, Istanbul)

== Notable commanders ==
- Mehmet Esat Bülkat (1862–1952), during the Dardanelles Campaign
- Refet Bele (1877–1967), commander during the Turkish War of Independence
- Fahrettin Altay (1880–1974), commander during the Turkish War of Independence

== Trials of the commanders ==
Former commander of 3rd Corps, Mustafa Ethem Erdağı, who also served as commander of ISAF in Afghanistan, was tried before a military court for allegations of abusing of his power while on duty at the 8th Corps in a construction tender held in the years 2002–2003. In May 2007, he was convicted for corruption to eleven and half months in prison. Erdağı became so the highest-ranked military officer in Turkey to be prisoned. He was forced to retire by the Supreme Military Council's annual meeting in August 2007.

In the Balyoz trial (literally: Sledgehammer trial) that began in 2010, retired General Ergin Saygun was arrested and indicted for his involvement in an alleged military coup plan to overthrow the Justice and Development Party government along with some other 365 military members, which reportedly dates back to 2003. At that time, he was the commander of the 3rd Corps. The court accused him for putting 3rd Corps headquarters as the center of the coup plan. General Saygun denied the accusations of the court with the defense that at that time he had taken orders to make arrangements for the conversion of the unit into a high readiness force headquarters assigned to NATO only. Therefore, they had no time for any plot preparations. Nevertheless, he was convicted and sentenced to 18 years in prison. However, he was released following a heart surgery due to his critical health condition.

In July 2016, Lieutenant General Erdal Öztürk, the corps commander at that time, was removed after the failed 2016 coup.

== See also ==
- III Corps (Ottoman Empire), history of the unit during the Ottoman era.
