= 9th Corps (Turkey) =

Turkish Land Forces field corps located in Erzurum as a part of Third Army

- Founded: 1921
- Country: Turkey
- Branch: Army
- Size: Corps
- Part of: Third Army
- Garrison/HQ: Erzurum, Erzurum Province

Commanders
- Major general: Erhan Uzun

The 9th Corps, Turkish Land Forces, is a field corps. The corps headquarters is located in Erzurum, and the corps is part of the Third Army (Turkey). It is deployed along Turkey's eastern boundary.

It traces its history to the 9th Corps (9. Kolordu) of the Ottoman Army. From November 1914 to August 1916 the 9th Corps in the Caucasus comprised the 17th, 28th, and 29th Divisions. Salih Omurtak commanded the corps as a lieutenant general during the 1930s.

The corps survived the large-scale force reductions of 1947-50 and continued to serve with the Turkish Third Army. Nigel Thomas's NATO Armies 1949-87, published in 1987, attributed the 4th, 8th, and 9th Corps to the Third Army.

In May 2012, the 48th Motorised Infantry Brigade hosted a symbolic one-day military service ceremony for disabled youths at the Erdoğdu Barracks in Trabzon. This is one of the last verified references to the 48th Brigade in Trabzon. The next time the brigade was reported, in May 2014, it had been reorganized as the 48th Border Brigade based at Şenoba in the Uludere district of Şırnak. It thus appeared to have been shifted into 7th Corps.

Official governorate announcements, change-of-command tracking, and regional operational briefs from 2023-2026 tend to indicate that the corps is made up of the 1st, 12th, and 14th Mechanized Infantry Brigades, 5 & 25 Border Brigades, and the 9th Commando Brigade. It also seems likely that the 109th Artillery Regiment at Erzurum is still part of the corps.

The 25th Border Brigade (HQ Ardahan) was reported to include a total of four battalions in 2020. They included the 1st Battalion, Artvin; 2nd Battalion, Martyr Astsb. Tuncay Güneş Barracks in Çıldır / Ardahan; and the 3rd and 4th Battalions at Kars.

Another unit previously associated with the corps was the 17th Commando Brigade.
