= Supreme Military Council (Turkey) =

Annual military planning committee

The Supreme Military Council (Turkish: Yüksek Askerî Şûra, YAŞ) is a committee in the Turkish Armed Forces. It convenes annually to determine the military's agenda. It was restructured in 2018.

It is formed under the chairpersonship of the president, vice president, the ministers of Justice, Interior, Foreign Affairs, Treasury and Finance, National Education, National Defense, Chief of General Staff, and the commanders of the Army, Navy and Air Force. The Secretary General of the Council is the Minister of National Defense.

Generally, council meetings are held in the first week of August and expands into three days. The appointments are made to be effective by 30 August (Victory Day). However, due to failed 15 July coup, the 2016 council meeting was held on 28 July 2016 and completed in a single day.

== Council members ==
Member	Office
Recep Tayyip Erdoğan	President
Cevdet Yılmaz	Vice President
Yılmaz Tunç	Minister of Justice
Ali Yerlikaya	Minister of the Interior
Hakan Fidan	Minister of Foreign Affairs
Mehmet Şimşek	Minister of Treasury and Finance
Yusuf Tekin	Minister of National Education
Yaşar Güler	Minister of National Defense
General Metin Gürak	Chief of the General Staff
General Selçuk Bayraktaroğlu	Commander of the Land Forces
Admiral Ercüment Tatlıoğlu	Commander of the Naval Forces
General Ziya Cemal Kadıoğlu	Commander of the Air Force

== See also ==
- National Security Council
- National security
