= Athanasios Sakettas =

Greek army officer (1882 or 1883–1922)

- Born: 1882 or 1883; Sparta, Kingdom of Greece
- Died: September 1922; Murat Dağı, Anatolia
- Military career
- Allegiance: Kingdom of Greece
- Branch: Hellenic Army
- Service years: 1903–1922
- Rank: Lieutenant colonel
- Conflicts: First Balkan War; Second Balkan War; World War I; Greco-Turkish War (1919–1922); Greek Summer Offensive; Battle of Sakarya; Great Offensive; Battle of Dumlupınar; Battle of Alıören †

Athanasios Sakettas (Note: His surname is also sometimes spelled Saketas (Greek: Σακέτας) or Sakketas (Greek: Σακκέτας).) (Greek: Αθανάσιος Σακέττας; 1882/1883 – September 1922), was a Greek army officer who served in the Balkan Wars, World War I and the Greco-Turkish War (1919–1922).

A lieutenant colonel and chief of staff, he is mostly remembered for his death in the aftermath of the Battle of Dumlupinar, in which he refused to surrender with the forces commanded by Nikolaos Trikoupis and was instead killed in a last stand, charging Turkish positions on horseback.

== Early life and military career ==
Sakettas was born in Sparta at 1882 or 1883. He attended school in his native city and lost his father while still a pupil. After completing secondary school, he enlisted voluntarily in the Greek Army in 1903 and attended the School of Non-Commissioned Officers. He was commissioned as a second lieutenant on 21 June 1910.

He served in the First Balkan War, the Second Balkan War and World War I. He was promoted to first lieutenant on 21 May 1913, captain on 21 May 1914, major on 13 December 1917 and lieutenant colonel on 7 October 1919. During the Greek Summer Offensive towards Philadelphia, Bursa and Uşak in June 1920, he served as chief of staff of the III Infantry Division. In July 1921, he became chief of staff of the XII Infantry Division under Colonel Periklis Kallidopoulos, serving with the Greek I Army Corps.

== Greco-Turkish War (1919–1922) ==
As chief of staff of the XII Infantry Division, Sakettas took part in the final stages of the Greco-Turkish War (1919–1922). The division participated in the Greek operations of 1921, including the Battle of Sakarya, and remained on the southern sector of the Greek front during the following year.

=== Turkish offensive and retreat ===
When the Turkish offensive began on 26 August 1922, the XII Infantry Division held the İnce Karahisar sector, with the 14th and 41st Infantry Regiments in the front line and the 46th in reserve. On 27 August, the division sent its 46th Regiment to reinforce the IV Infantry Division and was subsequently ordered to withdraw. During the ensuing retreat, the Greek formations became increasingly disorganized as Turkish forces threatened their lines of withdrawal.

On the evening of 29 August, some Greek officers discussed the possibility of surrender. According to Konstantinos Kanellopoulos, an officer serving at I Corps headquarters, Sakettas strongly opposed the suggestion. He argued that an infantry company could open a route towards Dumlupınar and personally led a detachment in an attack during the night. The exchange of fire may have pushed the Turkish troops back to some extent.

On 30 August, the XII Infantry Division fought in the Battle of Ali Veran (Alıören), suffering heavy losses. After nightfall, its remaining troops withdrew and became separated into columns. Sakettas lost contact with his division at approximately 1 a.m. on 31 August and subsequently joined the column led by Generals Nikolaos Trikoupis and Kimon Digenis.

=== Death ===
Two days later, when the decision had finally been made to surrender Trikoupis's army corps to the Turks, Athanasios Sakettas, inspired by the traditions of his native land (for he was born and raised in Sparta), charged, fully armed, towards the ravines of Murat Dağı, not to beg the enemy to spare his life, but to uphold the Spartan oath: EITHER WITH IT OR ON IT!

— Colonel George L. Spyridonos, director of the Greek Army's Fourth Staff Bureau during the war

On 2 September 1922, the exhausted column commanded by Nikolaos Trikoupis was surrounded by Turkish troops near Karaca Hisar, in the vicinity of Murat Dağı. With the remaining soldiers unable to continue the retreat, Trikoupis decided to surrender. Sakettas, who had already opposed surrender during the preceding days, reacted angrily to the announcement.

Sakettas in 1922

Sakettas refused to accept the decision and mounted his horse before anyone could restrain him. As a staff officer, Sakettas had no unit of his own to lead. He charged, either alone or with very few men, towards the Turkish positions in an attempt to break out of the encirclement. The Turkish soldiers initially panicked, but, upon realizing that he was alone or accompanied by only a handful of soldiers, concentrated their fire on him. Sakettas was struck by numerous bullets and killed.

Soldier Christos A. Spanomanolis, who was taken prisoner by the Turks following Sakettas' death, wrote:

Lieutenant Colonel Athanasios Sakettas of the Infantry, as General Kanellopoulos also recounts, had by then become beside himself, perhaps foreseeing a surrender. He moved among the various groups, thundering that he could never endure such disgrace. Then, placing himself at the head of the detachment assembled there, he charged the enemy with unbridled fury. And indeed, he succeeded in breaking through their lines at one point. Faithful to the traditions of his native Sparta, he launched another assault with a mere handful of soldiers. The Turks were taken by surprise when they saw him charging towards them... They were thrown into confusion... But when they realised how few men followed him, they counterattacked with concentrated fire, riddling his body with bullets! Such was Athanasios Sakettas, the Spartan.

Journalist Yannis Kapsis, instead, described that Sakettas both charged alone and died alone.

== Legacy ==
A Greek Army camp in the Vyronas–Kareas area of Attica is named after Sakettas. The graduating class of 2019 at the Hellenic Army's School of Permanent Non-Commissioned Officers was also named in his honour.

== Bibliography ==
- Georgiou, Stavros G. (2022). "Μνήμη Μικράς Ασίας. Τρεις ξεχασμένοι ήρωες: Δημήτριος Καλλιαγκάκης – Κωνσταντίνος Τσάκαλος – Αθανάσιος Σακέττας". Ενατενίσεις (in Greek) (39): 104–114.
- Kapsis, Giannis (1989). Χαμένες Πατρίδες (in Greek) (3rd ed.). Athens: Α. Α. Λιβάνη.
