= Nikolaos Trikoupis =

Greek general and politician

- Νικόλαος Τρικούπης
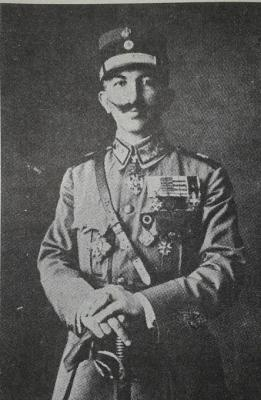
- Trikoupis c. 1920
- Born: c. 1868; Missolonghi, Kingdom of Greece
- Died: 27 February 1959 (age 90–91); Athens, Kingdom of Greece
- Burial place: First Cemetery of Athens
- Alma mater: Hellenic Army Academy; École Supérieure de Guerre
- Relatives: Charilaos Trikoupis
- Military career
- Allegiance: Kingdom of Greece; Second Hellenic Republic
- Branch: Hellenic Army
- Service years: 1888–1927
- Rank: Lieutenant General
- Commands: 1st Infantry Division (Chief of Staff); 3rd Infantry Division (Chief of Staff); III Army Corps (Chief of Staff); I Army Corps; II Army Corps; Army of Asia Minor
- Conflicts: Greco-Turkish War (1897); Balkan Wars; First Balkan War; Second Balkan War; Battle of Kilkis–Lachanas; Battle of Doiran; First World War; Macedonian front; Greco-Turkish War (1919–1922); Greek Summer Offensive; Battle of Kütahya–Eskişehir; Battle of the Sakarya; Greek Retreat; Battle of Dumlupınar
- Awards: Order of the Redeemer; War Cross; Medal of Military Merit; Order of the White Eagle; Legion of Honour; Croix de Guerre
- Other work: Prefect of Attica and Boeotia
- Sports career
Medal record
Men's shooting
Representing Greece
Olympic Games
Bronze medal – third place	1896 Athens	Military rifle

Nikolaos Trikoupis (Greek: Νικόλαος Τρικούπης; c. 1868–1956) was a Greek military officer and politician, most notable for his service in the Greco-Turkish War of 1919–1922, where he was taken as a prisoner of war. He also participated in the 1896 Summer Olympics, where he came third in the military rifle.

== Life ==
Born in Mesolongi in about 1868 to Themistoklis Trikoupis (member of the Trikoupis family, related to PM Charilaos Trikoupis), he entered the Hellenic Military Academy, which he graduated in 1888 as an Artillery Second Lieutenant. He furthered his studies in France, where he remained from 1889 to 1895, completing his tour there with courses at the École Supérieure de Guerre. He competed at the 1896 Summer Olympics, held in Athens, in the military rifle and the free rifle events. He came third in the first with a score of 1,713, after hitting the target 34 times out of a possible 40. His place and score in the second event are unknown, except that he did not finish in the top five.

In the Greco-Turkish War of 1897, he participated as chief of staff of the 1st Infantry Division. He joined the newly established General Staff Corps in 1904, and participated in the Balkan Wars of 1912–13 as chief of staff of the 3rd Infantry Division and the Damianos Detachment. After the Balkan Wars he served as regimental commander, and served as chief of staff of the III Army Corps and then as Deputy Chief of the Hellenic Army General Staff.

From 1917, he fought in the Macedonian front of the First World War as commander of the 3rd Infantry Division, being promoted to major general in 1918. He again commanded the 3rd Division in the spring and summer 1921 offensives during the Asia Minor Campaign. During the advance onto Eskişehir he also commanded the Northern Group of Divisions, and in July was placed in charge of the Southern Group around Afyonkarahisar. In September, he was moved to command of II Corps and in December to I Corps.

During the Turkish offensive in August 1922, Trikoupis was the senior Greek commander on the spot, having 5 divisions at his disposal. Having neglected to provide for adequate reconnaissance, his command was surprised by the Turkish attack. In order to avert the collapse of the front held by the 1st and 4th divisions, he ordered a retreat to the second line of defence NW of Afyon on the 13th. The successful Turkish attacks and the surrender of parts of I and II Corps a few days later sealed the fate of the Hellenic Army, which began a hasty withdrawal to the Aegean shore. On 29 August, while at Karaja Hisar, also known as Ali Veran (Greek: Ἀλῆ Βερὰν, modern Allioren, Turkey) near Kütahya, he was attacked by Turkish cavalry and surrendered along with a little more than 5,000 men and 300 officers. His captors led Trikoupis and Maj. Gen. Kimon Digenis (CO of II Corps) to Mustafa Kemal, who informed him that he had been appointed as commander-in-chief of the Army of Asia Minor, an episode highlighting the level of confusion in the Greek command.

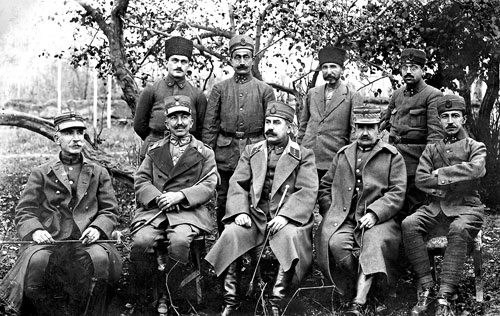
Greek Officers at the Kırşehir POW camp: from left to right, Col. Dimitrios Dimaras (4th Division), Maj. Gen. Nikolaos Trikoupis (I Corps), Staff Col. Adnan or Kemaleddin Sami, Maj. Gen. Kimon Digenis (II Corps) and Lieutenant Emin.

He returned to Greece in 1923 as part of the prisoners of war exchange, but unlike other senior officers and politicians, who were charged for their role in the disaster in the Trial of the Six, he was never prosecuted.

He was eventually recalled to active service and promoted to lieutenant general, before finally retiring on 27 November 1927, after which he served as prefect of Attica and Boeotia.

He died in 1959.
