= Dumlupınar =

Dumlupınar may refer to:

- Dumlupınar, Çubuk, a village in the District of Çubuk, Ankara Province, Turkey
- Dumlupınar, Kütahya, a town and district in Kütahya Province, Turkey
- Dumlupınar Stadium, a multi-purpose stadium in Kütahya, Turley
- Battle of Dumlupınar, a Greco-Turkish battle in the Turkish War of Independence
- TCG Dumlupınar, three different submarines operated by the Turkish Naval Forces
- Kütahya Dumlupınar University, a university in Kütahya, Turkey
