= Periklis Kallidopoulos =

Greek Army officer and Righteous Among the Nations

Periklis Kollidopoulos
- Περικλής Καλλιδόπουλος
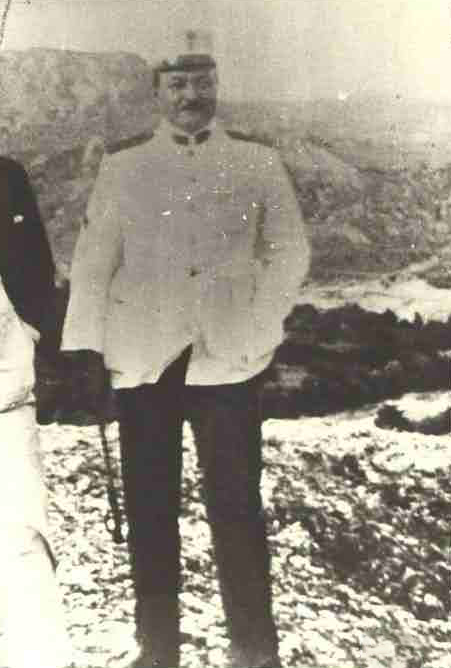
- Periklis Kallidopoulos c. 1922

Minister Governor-General of Macedonia
- In office 4 July 1928 – 7 June 1929
- President: Pavlos Kountouriotis
- Prime Minister: Eleftherios Venizelos

Member of Parliament for Chalkidiki
- In office 1928
- President: Pavlos Kountouriotis
- Prime Minister: Eleftherios Venizelos

Member of Parliament for Thessaloniki
- In office 1924
- Monarch: George II
- Prime Minister: Eleftherios Venizelos

Personal details
- Born: 1 January 1878 Riza, Salonika Vilayet, Ottoman Empire (now Greece)
- Died: 23 April 1950 (aged 72) Athens, Kingdom of Greece
- Spouse: Aikaterini Fotiadou
- Children: Panagiotis; Alexandros
- Education: Hellenic Army Academy
- Awards: Mentioned in Dispatches; Righteous Among the Nations

Military service
- Allegiance: Kingdom of Greece
- Branch/service: Hellenic Army
- Years of service: 1896–1923
- Rank: Major General
- Unit: 7th Infantry Regiment; 1st Infantry Regiment
- Commands: 2nd Infantry Division; 12th Infantry Division; 13th Infantry Division
- Battles/wars: Greco-Turkish War (1897); Battle of Velestino (WIA); Balkan Wars; First Balkan War; Battle of Yenidje; Battle of Bizani; Second Balkan War; Battle of Kilkis-Lachanas (WIA); World War I; Macedonian Front; Greco-Turkish War (1919-1922); Occupation of Smyrna; Second Battle of İnönü; Battle of Kütahya–Eskişehir; Battle of the Sakarya; Greek Retreat; Battle of Dumlupınar (POW); World War II; Greek Resistance

Periklis Kallidopoulos (Greek: Περικλής Καλλιδόπουλος) was a Hellenic Army officer who reached the rank of major general, before entering politics. During World War II, he was active in the Greek Resistance, and is honoured as a "Righteous Among the Nations" by Yad Vashem.

== Life ==
He was born at Thessaloniki, then still under Ottoman rule, in 1878. He studied in the Hellenic Army Academy, graduating in 1896 as an infantry second lieutenant. He fought in the Greco-Turkish War of 1897 as an officer of the 7th Infantry Regiment, distinguishing himself during the Battle of Velestino, where he was wounded and mentioned in dispatches.

In 1900–1904 he continued his military studies in France and Belgium. During the First Balkan War, he commanded an infantry company, was wounded in the Battle of Yenidje, and fought in the Battle of Bizani. Transferred to the 1st Infantry Regiment, he fought in the Second Balkan War as a company commander. He was wounded again at the Battle of Kilkis.

He commanded a regiment at the Macedonian front during World War I. In 1919–1920, he served as deputy garrison commander, garrison commander, and general military governor, of Smyrna during its occupation by the Greek army. Following the royalist victory in the November 1920 elections, he tendered a request to be suspended from active duty, but this was denied, and he was appointed infantry commander of the 2nd Infantry Division. He fought in the Second Battle of İnönü in March 1921, before being moved to the 12th Infantry Division, again as divisional infantry commander. After the Battle of Kütahya–Eskişehir he was promoted to commander of the 13th Division, which he led in the Battle of Sakarya in summer 1921, as well as in the Battle of Dumlupınar in August 1922, when he was taken captive with the rest of the division.

Released in August 1923, Kallidopoulos retired from the army soon after and entered politics. He was repeatedly elected to the Greek Parliament for Thessaloniki. From 4 July 1928 until 7 June 1929 he served as Minister Governor-General of Macedonia in the cabinet of Eleftherios Venizelos.

During the Axis occupation of Greece, he was active in the Greek Resistance.

Together with his son Alexandros, he helped save their Jewish neighbours, the Cohen family, by bringing them food and money during their confinement to the Thessaloniki ghetto, and then helping them escape the city, either to join the Resistance, or to Athens, which lay in the safer Italian zone of occupation. In recognition of this, Kallidopoulos and his son were named among the "Righteous Among the Nations" by Yad Vashem in 1989.
