= 41st Infantry Regiment (Greece) =

- 41 Σύνταγμα Πεζικού, 41 ΣΠ
- Engagements: Greco-Turkish War (1919–1922); Battle of the Sakarya

The 41st Infantry Regiment (Greek: 41 Σύνταγμα Πεζικού, 41 ΣΠ) is a historic unit of the Hellenic Army. Today its name and tradition are borne by the military command of Samothrace island in the northern Aegean Sea, as the 41st Infantry Regiment "Saranta Ekklisies" Tactical Command (Τακτική Διοίκηση 41 Συντάγματος Πεζικού "ΣΑΡΑΝΤΑ ΕΚΚΛΗΣΙΕΣ", ΤΔ/41 ΣΠ).

== History ==
The 41st Infantry Regiment was formed in September 1920 in Saranta Ekklisies in Eastern Thrace (Kirk-Kilise, now Kirklareli in Turkey), at the time under Greek control, as part of the Xanthi Division, soon to be renamed into the 12th Infantry Division. On 1 June 1921, the regiment landed at Smyrna and took part in the Greek offensive in July–September, which culminated in the Battle of Sakarya. After the Greek withdrawal, the regiment, along with the rest of the 12th Division, was placed on the heights northeast of Afyon Karahisar. Following the Turkish breakthrough in the Battle of Dumlupinar, the regiment retreated westwards to the Aegean coast and embarked at Çeşme on 31 August for Chios.

As part of the Army of the Evros, the regiment was then successively moved to Alexandroupoli, Didymoteicho and Ferres in late 1922/early 1923, before being moved to its peacetime quarters in Xanthi after the signing of the Treaty of Lausanne in July 1923. The regiment was re-formed anew with the general mobilization after the Italian invasion of Greece on 28 October 1940, and undertook garrison duties in the Metaxas Line, in the area of Achladochori. After the German invasion of Greece and the capitulation of the Greek Army, the regiment was disbanded.

On 20 February 2004, the title of the 41st Infantry Regiment, as well as the honorific name "Saranta Ekklisies", were given to the 289th Infantry Battalion Tactical Command (Τ∆/289 ΤΠ) which formed the garrison of the island of Samothrace. The island had been devoid of military presence until the Turkish invasion of Cyprus in 1974. After that it was successively defended by a company from the 290th National Guard Battalion in nearby Lemnos, by the separate Samothrace Command until 1982, and by the 289th National Guard Battalion, reduced in 1995 to a Tactical Command level.

== Insignia ==
The Tactical Command's emblem is the statue of the Winged Victory of Samothrace, superimposed on an outline of the island and surrounded by a wreath, on a light blue background. The top bears the unit's motto ΚΛΕΟΣ ΑΦΘΙΤΟΝ ΕΣΤΑΙ ("glory is imperishable"), a quote by Achilles in Homer's Iliad (I.413). Below the statue is a scroll with the unit's honorific name. The unit flag consists of the whole emblem superimposed on three horizontal bands of black, red, and green, the distinctive colours of artillery, infantry and armour in the Hellenic Army, separated by thin gold stripes.
