= TCG Dumlupınar =

TCG Dumlupınar may refer to a number of submarines operated by the Turkish Naval Forces: They are named for the Battle of Dumlupınar in August 1923, the last battle in the Greco-Turkish War.

- TCG Dumlupınar (1931), an Italian-built submarine of the Vettor Pisani type, in operation from 1931 to 1949.
- TCG Dumlupınar (1950), a Balao-class submarine transferred to Turkey by the US in 1950. The vessel and its crew perished in an accident in 1953 when they were struck by a freighter off the coast of the Dardanelles.
- TCG Dumlupınar (S339), a Balao-class submarine transferred to Turkey by the US in 1972. Similar to its preceding namefellow, this vessel was also struck by a freighter in the Dardanelles, but survived the accident and continued serving until she was retired in 1986.

== See also ==
- Dumlupınar (disambiguation)
