= 12th Mechanized Infantry Division (Greece) =

Military unit of the Hellenic Army

12th Mechanized Infantry Division "EVROS"
- ΧΙΙ Μηχανοκίνητη Μεραρχία Πεζικού "ΕΒΡΟΣ"
- Camp flag of the 12th Mechanized Infantry Division
- Active: 1913–1916; 1920–1941; 1964–today
- Country: Greece
- Branch: Hellenic Army
- Type: Mechanized infantry
- Size: Division
- Part of: IV Army Corps
- Garrison/HQ: Alexandroupolis, Thrace
- Mottos: Until one of them falls Έως αν τον ετέρον προπεσείν Eos an ton eteron propesin
- Engagements: Greco-Turkish War (1919–1922); Greek Summer Offensive; Battle of Kütahya–Eskişehir; Battle of the Sakarya; Greek Retreat; Battle of Dumlupınar; World War II; Battle of Greece; Battle of Siatitsa Pass

Commanders
- Notable commanders: Konstantinos Mazarakis-Ainian; Periklis Kallidopoulos; Athanasios Sakettas

The 12th Mechanized Infantry Division "Evros" (Greek: ΧΙΙ Μηχανοκίνητη Μεραρχία Πεζικού «ΕΒΡΟΣ» Dodekati Mihanokiniti Merarhia Pezikou «EVROS») is a military formation of the Hellenic Army, based at Alexandroupolis, Thrace.

== History ==
The division was formed in the reorganization and expansion of the Hellenic Army following the Balkan Wars of 1912–13. It was activated on 23 December (O.S.) 1913 at Kozani, comprising the 31st, 32nd, 33rd Infantry Regiments and the XII Mountain Artillery Battalion. It formed part of III Army Corps. The original formation was disbanded during the National Schism and did not take part in any engagements during World War I.

In February 1920, the Xanthi Division (Μεραρχία Ξάνθης; Merarkhia Xanthis) was formed at Thessaloniki from Thracian recruits, whence its naming after the city of Xanthi. Commanded by Major General Konstantinos Mazarakis-Ainian, it comprised the 13th, 14th, 15th Infantry Regiments, the XII Mountain Artillery Regiment and other divisional units. In May 1920, the division took part in the Greek takeover of Western Thrace, after which it was shipped to Anatolia where it took part in the Greek offensive operations against the Turkish nationalist forces. In July it was withdrawn from the Anatolian front and re-shipped to take part in the operations for the capture of Eastern Thrace.

Following the 1920 elections and the victory of the anti-Venizelist royalist coalition, the Xanthi Division was renamed as the 12th Infantry Division.

In early 1921, it was reformed under the command of Prince Andrew and, comprising the 14th, 41st and 46th Regiments, was transferred once again to the Anatolian front, landing in Smyrna between 29 May and 6 June 1921. The division took part in the Battle of Kütahya–Eskişehir and the Greek advance to Ankara, which ended in the Battle of Sakarya. The division was commanded from 15 July by Colonel Periklis Kallidopoulos. Athanasios Sakettas was also a notable lieutenant colonel within the division. The division remained in Anatolia under I Army Corps until the great Turkish offensive in August 1922. The division was practically destroyed as a fighting force after the Battle of Dumlupınar; its remnants—155 officers, 2,240 men, 1,010 animals, 18 guns and 15 machine-guns—embarked at Çeşme for Chios on 31 August.

In Greece, its remnants were merged with the Independent Division to form the new 12th Division at Feres as part of the Army of the Evros (October 1922). It remained in Western Thrace after the signature of the Treaty of Lausanne, based at Komotini. Upon the outbreak of the Greco-Italian War in October 1940, the division remained in Thrace, and provided the cadre for several reserve regiments, which were transferred to other divisions. On 6 March 1941, with the expected German invasion of Greece looming, the division was transferred to the Central Macedonia Army Section, and was placed under the British Commonwealth troops holding the Vermion–Aliakmon line. Coming under German attack at the Battle of Siatista Pass, the division retreated to the southwest and lost much of its force to desertion; finally, with the Greek capitulation on 24 April, the division, by now reduced to some 1,000 men, was disbanded.

12th Infantry Division was reformed on 26 August 1964 at Alexandroupolis, with the 29th, 30th and 31st Regiments and other divisional units. In June 1996 it was converted into a mechanized infantry division, and in 2009 it received the honorific title "Evros".

== Organization ==
Locations of 12th Mechanized Infantry Division units

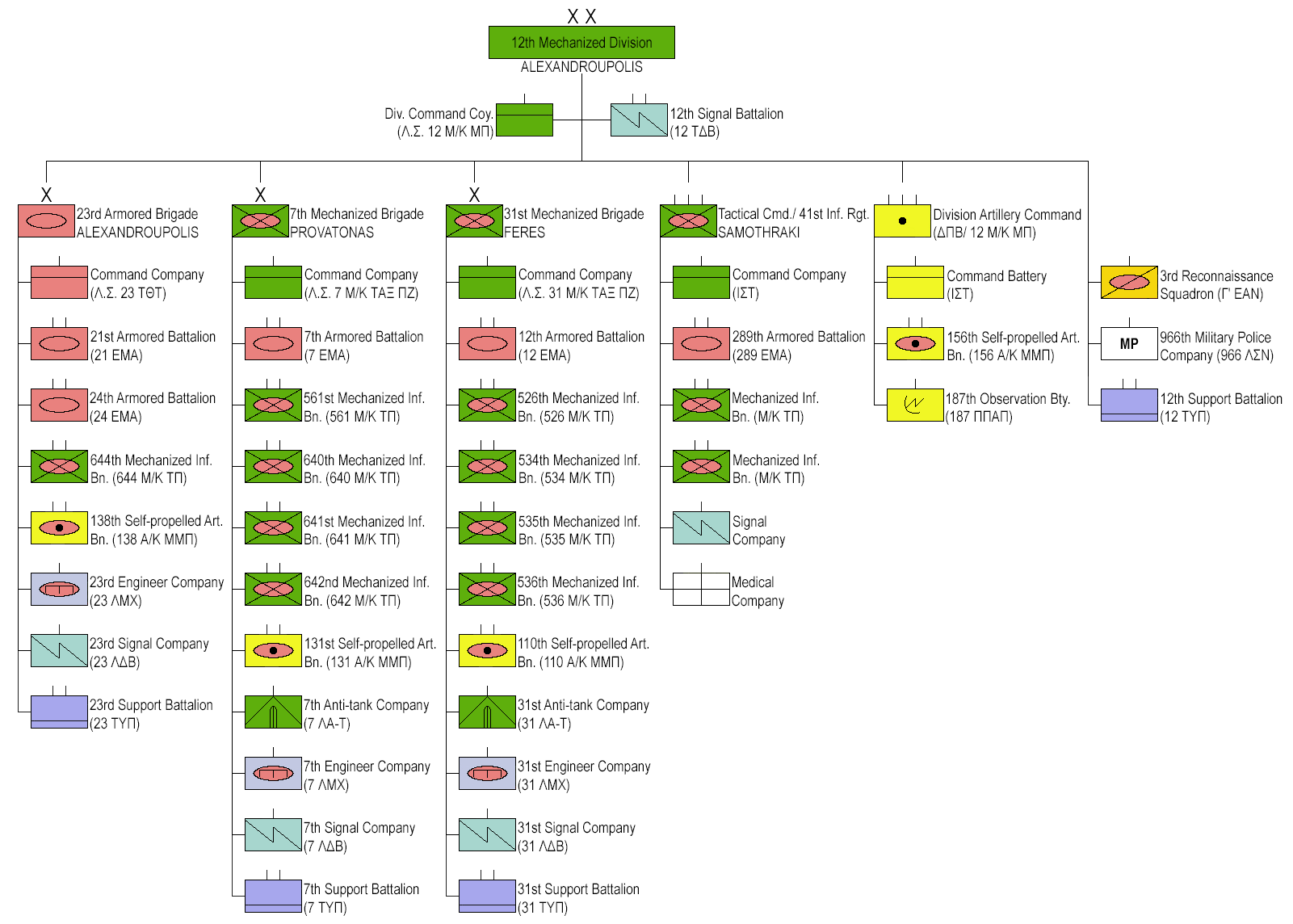
Structure of the 12th Mechanized Infantry Division

- HQ Company (ΛΣ/ΧΙΙ Μ/Κ ΜΠ)
- 3rd Armoured Cavalry Squadron (Γ'ΕΑΝ)
- 12th Support Battalion
- 12th Signal Company (12ο ΤΔΒ)
- 966th Military Police Company
- Tactical Command/41st Infantry Regiment (ΤΔ/41οΣΠ), based at Samothraki
- Division Artillery Command (ΔΠΒ/ΧΙΙ Μ/Κ ΜΠ)
  - HQ Company
  - 156th Self Propelled Artillery Battalion (156 Α/K ΜΜΠ pzh 2000Gr)
  - 187th Observation Battery (187 ΠΠΑΠ)
- 7th Mechanized Brigade (7η M/K ΤΑΞ Σαραντάπορος), based at Provatonas
  - HQ Company (ΙΣΤ)
  - 7th Armoured Battalion (7 ΕΜΑ)
  - 561st Mechanized Infantry Battalion (561 M/K ΤΠ)
  - 641st Mechanized Infantry Battalion (641 M/K ΤΠ)
  - 642nd Mechanized Infantry Battalion (642 M/K ΤΠ)
  - Self Propelled Artillery Battalion (131 Μ Α/K ΠΒ)
  - 7th Antitank Company (7 ΛΑΤ)
  - 7th Engineer Company (7 ΛΜΧ)
  - 7th Signal Company (7 ΛΔΒ)
  - 7th Support Battalion (7 ΤΥΠ)
- 23rd Armored Brigade in Alexandroupolis
  - HQ Company (ΙΣΤ)
  - 21st Armored Battalion (21 ΕΜΑ)
  - 24th Armored Battalion (24 ΕΜΑ)
  - 644 Mechanized Infantry Battalion (644 M/K ΤΠ)
  - 138 Self Propelled Artillery Battalion (138 Α/Κ ΜΜΠ)
  - 23rd Engineer Company (23 ΛΜΧ)
  - 23rd Signal Company (23 ΛΔΒ)
  - 23rd Support Battalion (23 ΕΥΠ)
- 31st Mechanized Brigade (31η M/K ΤΑΞ Κάμια), based at Feres
  - HQ Company (ΙΣΤ)
  - 12th Armored Battalion (12 ΕΜΑ)
  - 526th Mechanized Infantry Battalion (526 M/K ΤΠ)
  - 535th Mechanized Infantry Battalion (535 M/K ΤΠ)
  - 536th Mechanized Infantry Battalion (536 M/K ΤΠ)
  - 110th Self Propelled Artillery Battalion (110 Μ Α/K ΠΒ)
  - 31st Antitank Company (31 ΛΑΤ)
  - 31st Engineer Company (31 ΛΜΧ)
  - 31st Signal Company (31 ΛΔΒ)
  - 31st Support Battalion (31 ΤΥΠ)

== Emblem and motto ==
The division's emblem depicts two roosters confronting each other. It and the divisional motto, Έως αν τον ετέρον προπεσείν (Eos an ton eteron propesin; "Until one of them falls") are inspired by a quote of the historian Polybius, describing the Romans and Carthaginians during the First Punic War: "We may compare the spirit displayed by both states to that of game cocks engaged in a death-struggle. For we often see that when these birds have lost the use of their wings from exhaustion, their courage remains as high as ever and they continue to strike blow upon blow, until closing involuntarily they get a deadly hold of each other, and as soon as this happens one or the other of the two will soon fall dead."
