= Petros Soumilas =

Greek Army officer

- Πέτρος Σουμίλας/Σουμίλης
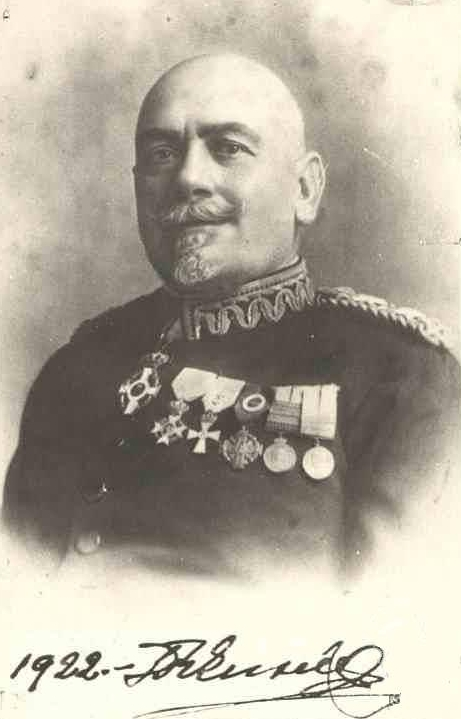
- Petros Soumilas c. 1922
- Born: c. 1861; Leukas, United States of the Ionian Islands (now Greece)
- Died: c. 1955; Leukas, Ionian Islands, Kingdom of Greece
- Military career
- Allegiance: Kingdom of Greece
- Branch: Hellenic Army
- Service years: 1882–1917; 1920–1923
- Rank: Lieutenant General
- Unit: Hellenic Military Geographical Service
- Commands: 11th Infantry Division (3rd Battalion); Xanthi Division; 10th Infantry Division; III Army Corps
- Conflicts: Greco-Turkish War (1897); Balkan Wars; First Balkan War; Second Balkan War; Greco-Turkish War (1919–1922); Greek Summer Offensive; Battle of Afyonkarahisar–Eskişehir; Battle of the Sakarya; Greek Retreat
- Awards: Order of the Redeemer; Commander of the Order of George I Gold Cross of Valour; Medal of Military Merit

Petros Soumilas or Soumilis (Greek: Πέτρος Σουμίλας/Σουμίλης) was a Hellenic Army officer who reached the rank of lieutenant general.

== Life ==
He was born in Leukas (then under British rule) on 1 January 1861. He joined the Hellenic Army on 2 August 1882, and later enrolled in the NCO School, from where he graduated in August 1888 as a Second Lieutenant of Infantry. He served as a topography instructor and in the newly established Hellenic Military Geographical Service, and participated in the Greco-Turkish War of 1897 and the Balkan Wars. During the latter he commanded the 3rd Battalion of the 11th Infantry Regiment, and occasionally substituted for the regimental commander as well.

As a monarchist, he was dismissed from the Army in 1917–1920 during the National Schism. He was reinstated with the electoral defeat of Eleftherios Venizelos in November 1920 which brought the royalist opposition to power, and assumed command of the Xanthi Division in Eastern Thrace. In May 1921 he was transferred to command the 10th Infantry Division in Anatolia, and he led it in the Greek summer offensive and the advance towards the Sakarya river. In 1922 he was placed in command of the III Army Corps, which he commanded during the collapse and retreat of the Greek army from Anatolia in August 1922.

Following the outbreak of the Venizelist-led September 1922 Revolution among the surviving Army units, he was dismissed from service on 17 October 1922. He testified in the Trial of the Six.
