= Dumlupınar District =

District of Kütahya Province, Turkey

- District
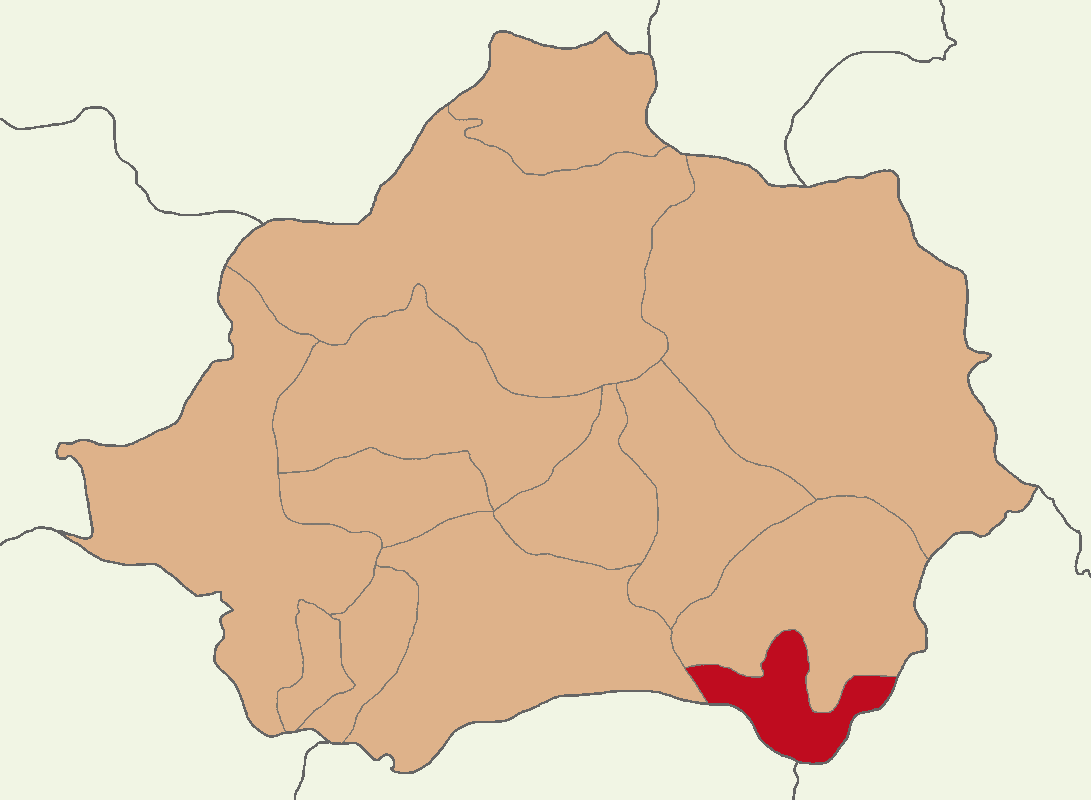
- Map showing Dumlupınar District in Kütahya Province

- Location in Turkey Dumlupınar District (Turkey Aegean)
- Coordinates: 38°51′N 29°58′E
- Country: Turkey
- Province: Kütahya
- Seat: Dumlupınar

Government
  - Kaymakam: Bilal Basrı
- Area: 250 km^{2} (100 sq mi)
- Population (2022): 2,854
  - Density: 11/km^{2} (30/sq mi)
- Time zone: UTC+3 (TRT)
- Website: www.dumlupinar.gov.tr

Dumlupınar District is a district of the Kütahya Province of Turkey. Its seat is the town of Dumlupınar. Its area is 250 km^{2}, and its population is 2,854 (2022).

== Composition ==
There is one municipality in Dumlupınar District:

- Dumlupınar

There are 10 villages in Dumlupınar District:

- Ağaçköy
- Allıören
- Arpalı
- Büyükaslıhanlar
- Eydemir
- Hamur
- Kızılca
- Küçükaslıhanlar
- Selkisaray
- Yüylük
