= Dimitrios Dimaras =

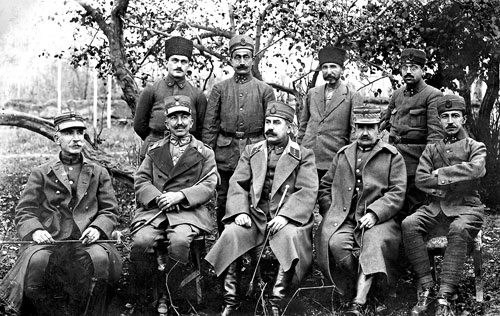
Greek Officers at the Kırşehir POW camp: from left to right, Dimaras (4th Division), Maj. Gen. Nikolaos Trikoupis (I Corps), Staff Col. Adnan or Kemaleddin Sami, Maj. Gen. Kimon Digenis (II Corps) and Lieutenant Emin.

Dimitrios Dimaras (Greek: Δημήτριος Δημαράς, 1869–1926) was a Greek army general.

He was born at Nafplio in 1869. He entered the Hellenic Army Academy, graduating as a second lieutenant of engineers in 1892.

He participated in the Greco-Turkish War of 1897 and the two Balkan Wars of 1912–1913. He retired in November 1919, but was recalled to service in 1920, and appointed division commander on the Asia Minor front. He was taken prisoner during the Battle of Dumlupınar and not repatriated to Greece until a prisoner exchange in 1923.

He was dismissed from service on 12 November 1923 with the rank of major general, and died on 5 March 1926.
