= 31st Mechanized Infantry Brigade (Greece) =

Hellenic Army formation

31st Mechanized Infantry Brigade "Kamia"
- 31η Μηχανοκίνητη Ταξιαρχία Πεζικού «ΚΑΜΙΑ»
- Emblem of the 31st Mechanized Infantry Brigade
- Country: Greece
- Branch: Hellenic Army
- Type: mechanized infantry
- Size: 5 Battalions
- Part of: 12th Mechanized Infantry Division
- Garrison/HQ: Feres, Western Thrace
- Motto: Wreaths belong to those who labor (Tων κοπιώντων οι στέφανοι Ton kopiodon i stefani)

The 31st Mechanized Infantry Brigade "Kamia" (Greek: 31η Μηχανοκίνητη Ταξιαρχία Πεζικού «ΚΑΜΙΑ», 31η M/K ΤΑΞ) is a mechanized infantry brigade of the Hellenic Army, headquartered in Feres and subordinated to the 12th Mechanized Infantry Division.

== Structure ==
31st Mechanized Infantry Brigade "Kamia"

- HQ Company (ΙΣΤ)
- 31st Signal Company (31 ΛΔΒ)
- 31st Engineer Company (31 ΛΜΧ)
- 12th Armored Battalion (12 ΕΜΑ)
- 526th Mechanized Infantry Battalion (526 M/K ΤΠ)
- 535th Mechanized Infantry Battalion (535 M/K ΤΠ)
- 536th Mechanized Infantry Battalion (536 M/K ΤΠ)
- 110th Self Propelled Artillery Battalion (110 Α/K ΜΜΠ)
- 31st Antitank Company (31 ΛΑΤ)
- 31st Support Battalion (31 ΤΥΠ)
