= Dindymon =

Sacred mountain of ancient Phrygia

Dindymon /ˈdɪndəˌmɒn/ (Ancient Greek: Δίνδυμον), was a mountain in eastern Phrygia (today's Murat Dağı of Gediz), later part of Galatia, that was later called Agdistis, sacred to the "mountain mother", Cybele, whom the Hellenes knew as Rhea. Strabo sited Dindymon above Pessinos, sacred to Cybele. It was an important location in Greek mythology.

A Mount Dindymon might also be placed on the peninsula of Cyzicus facing the Sea of Marmara, as in Apollonius of Rhodes' Argonautica, or by Stephanus Byzantinicus further south, in the Troad, thus near Mount Ida. Argonautica book I sets a scene at Mount Dindymon, where Jason placates the goddess of the mountain, "the mother of all the blessed gods, where she sits enthroned". identified as "Dindymene [Δινδυμηνή] the mother, Lady of many names," among which was Rhea.

When Dionysus saw the virgin Aura, an attendant of Artemis, he fell in love with her. Rejected by her, he secretly intoxicated with wine and raped her while she was passed out. Artemis in rage kicked her out of the group, and Aura terrified fled to the town of Cyzicus, where she gave birth to twin babies; thus the mountain nearby got its name, 'Dindymon' ("twin"), after Aura's children.

Appian mentions a "Mount Dindymus" during the Siege of Cyzicus in 73 BC. Mithridates VI of Pontus attempted to undermine the city by digging mines from the mountain, but the Cyzicans undermined them, causing Mithridates to abandon the siege.

== Etymology ==
The various applications of Dindymon, as the mountain of the Anatolian Mother Goddess, the "Mountain Mother", is explained by Robinson Ellis: "The name Dindymenian mother would in the first instance no doubt be connected with the earliest seat of the worship, the Phrygian Dindymon, but as soon as the worship spread farther and the name of Dindymon with it, the Goddess of Dindymon would lose its original definiteness and be variously applied by different writers."
