= Kimon Digenis =

Greek general (c. 1871–1945)

- Κίμων Διγενής
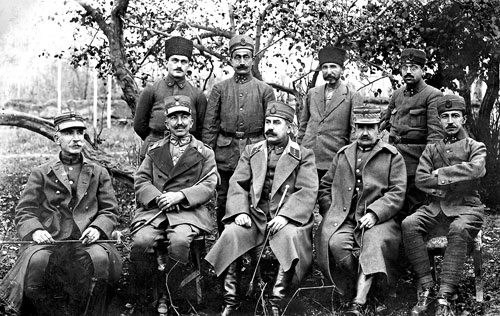
- Greek generals at the Kırşehir POW camp: from left to right, Col. Dimitrios Dimaras (4th Division), Maj. Gen. Nikolaos Trikoupis (I Corps), Staff Col. Adnan or Kemaleddin Sami, Maj. Gen. Kimon Digenis (II Corps) and Lt. Emin
- Born: c. 1871; Kimolos, Kingdom of Greece
- Died: c. 1945; Athens, Kingdom of Greece
- Education: Hellenic Military Academy
- Military career
- Allegiance: Kingdom of Greece
- Branch: Hellenic Army
- Service years: 1891–1922
- Rank: Major General
- Commands: 13th Infantry Division; II Army Corps
- Conflicts: Greco-Turkish War (1897); Balkan Wars: First Balkan War; Second Balkan War; World War I: Macedonian front; Greco-Turkish War (1919–1922): Battle of the Sakarya; Greek Retreat; Battle of Dumlupınar (POW)

Kimon Digenis (Greek: Κίμων Διγενής) (c. 1871–1945) was a Hellenic Army officer who reached the rank of Major General.

He was born in Kimolos, South Aegean in about 1871. He enrolled in the Hellenic Military Academy, and graduated in 1891 as a Second Lieutenant of the Artillery. He fought in the Greco-Turkish War of 1897, the Balkan Wars, the Macedonian front of World War I and the Asia Minor Campaign.

During the Asia Minor Campaign, after the electoral defeat of the Liberal Party in November 1920, he replaced the Venizelist Colonel Konstantinos Manetas as commander of the 13th Infantry Division and commanded it in the operations of the spring and summer of 1921. In 1922, as Major General, he was in command of the II Army Corps.

Following the Battle of Dumlupınar, he became a prisoner of war in Asia Minor in August 1922 and after a large-scale Army revolt that toppled the royalist government, he was dismissed from the army.

He died in Athens in 1945.
