= Murat Dağı =

Mountain in western Anatolia, Turkey

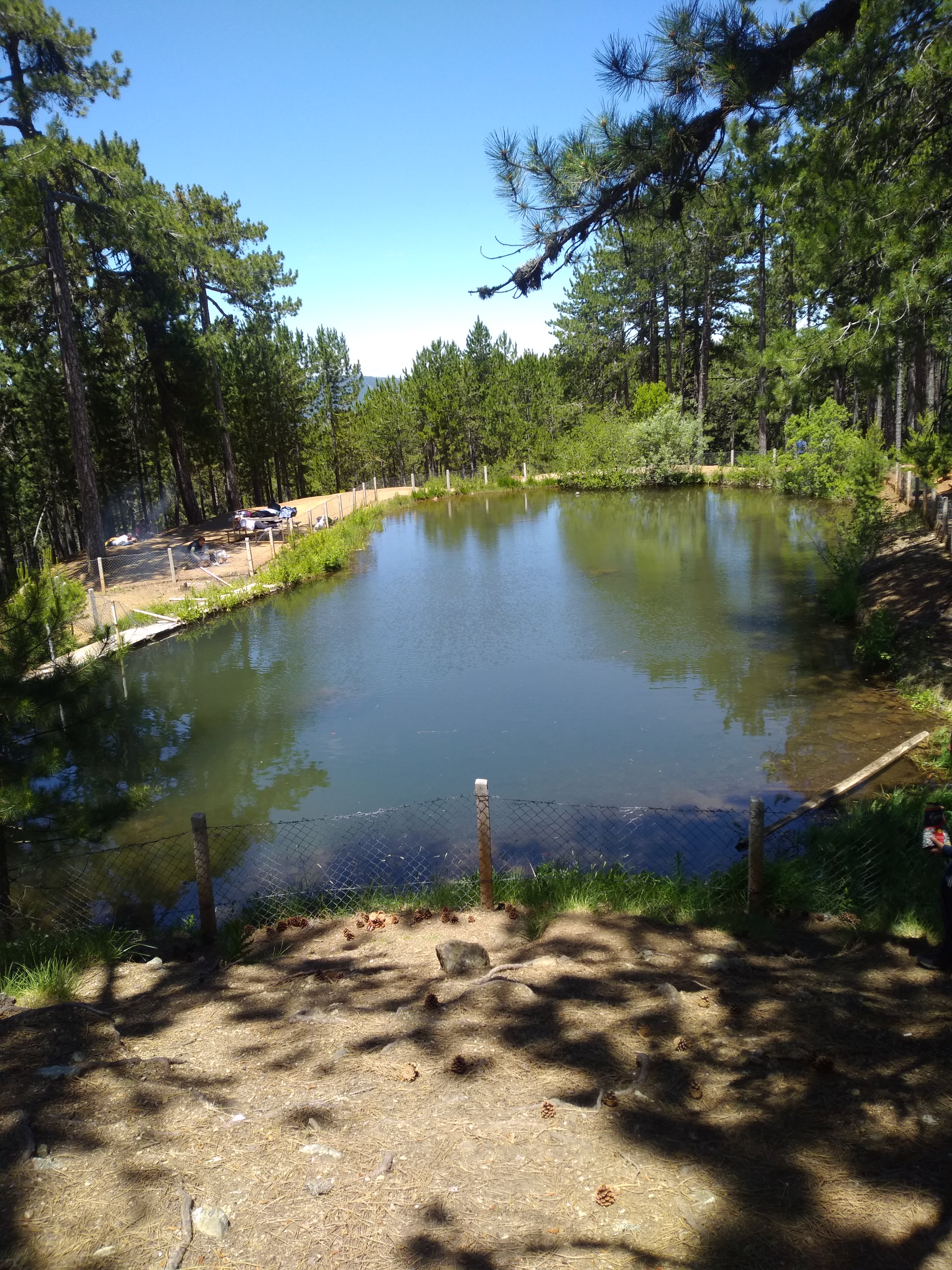
- Spring-fed pond on Murat Dağı

Highest point
- Elevation: 2,309 m (7,575 ft)
- Coordinates: 38°56′14″N 29°40′25″E

Geography
- Location within Turkey
- Country: Turkey
- Province: Border between Kütahya and Uşak Provinces
- District(s): Gediz, Altıntaş, and Banaz

Murat Dağı (or "Murat Mountain") is a mountain in western Anatolia, Turkey. It forms part of the border between Kütahya and Uşak provinces. It was known as Dindymos (Ancient Greek: Δίνδυμος) in ancient times. It is located at the convergence of three climactic zones, with a relatively wetter north side covered by beech forest and a relatively drier south side covered by oak forest.

== Geography ==
Murat Dağı is located in the border zone between the Aegean and inner Anatolian regions. It forms the border between present-day Kütahya and Uşak provinces, with Kütahya province to the north and Uşak province to the south. Its general direction is northwest-southeast, and its highest point is the peak of Kartaltepe, at 2,309 m. Other peaks include Kırkpınar Tepe (2218 m), Tınaz Tepe (2097 m), Çatmalı Mezar Tepe (1990 m), and Kazık Batmaz Tepe (1857 m). The mountain's terrain is generally rugged, but there are also some plateau areas on it. The Gediz River has its sources on the mountain.

There are two small wetlands in the area: Gölyeri, which dries up in summer, and Kuzugöl, a glacial lake.

== History ==
Murat Dağı was known as Dindymos (Δίνδυμος) (Ancient Greek: Δίνδυμος) in ancient times. At the end of the 19th century, there was reportedly still a Byzantine-era domed structure over a hot spring on the west side of the mountain, 500 m below the summit. Further down the mountain, there was an old "winter bath" with a water supply system.

== Geology ==
Murat Dağı is predominantly composed of Paleozoic schist, limestone, and serpentinite.

=== Mineral resources ===
Murat Dağı has Turkey's second-largest antimony deposits (with Turhal in Tokat Province being the largest). The antimony deposits are found solely on the north side of the mountain and have been mined intermittently since their discovery around the year 1900. The two main mines have been the Göynük mine, with was still active as of 1989, and the Dereköy mine, which had been abandoned by then. Antimony deposits at Murat Dağı mostly consist of stibnite and as secondary oxides of various other ultramafic rocks.

The mountain also has rich mercury deposits at its lower levels, particularly concentrated in the southern areas around Banaz. (Note: Quoted in Oy 2018, p. 285) No mercury deposits are found on the north side of the mountain.

== Climate ==
The whole area gets at least 500 mm of rain per year on average. The north side is relatively humid, while the south side is semi-humid. The dry season is between June and August.

== Foliage ==
Murat Dağı features extensive forest cover, with a wide variety of species present due to its location at the convergence of three different climactic zones (Black Sea, Mediterranean, and continental). The different climates result in different plant species growing on the north vs. south sides of the mountain. In general, since the northern slopes of Murat Dağı are more humid, plants from the Black Sea Biogeographic Region grow here. The north side is dominated by beech forests (Fagus orientalis), which is particularly abundant between 1450-2000 m, because it thrives in environments that get fog and diffuse sky radiation. On the drier south side, beech is absent and the predominant cover is oak forests (Quercus sp.).

Four plant species are found only on this mountain: Alyssum davisianum, Prometheum muratdaghense, Pyrus anatolica, and Verbascum coronopifolium.

Extensive coppicing has been done in many parts of the mountain forests. On the south side, these areas now consist of shrubbery and oak coppices.

Scots pine (Pinus sylvestris), which has a high demand for light, grows on both north and south sides between 1500-1900 m. Like beech, aspen (Populus tremula) loves fog and diffuse radiation, and it grows on the north side between 1300-1700 m.

Some tree species are not particularly dense on the north face, but grow scattered in some drier places. These are hornbeam (Carpinus betulus), field maple (Acer campestre), Caucasian linden (Tilia rubra, subspecies caucasica), Balkan maple (Acer hyrcanum), tall juniper (Juniperus excelsa), and stinking juniper (Juniperus foetidissima).

On the east and west sides of the mountain, beech begins slightly lower, at 1400 m, and it continues up to the subalpine zone, where it grows in mixed forests along with black pine (Pinus nigra), hornbeam (Carpinus betulus), Turkey oak (Quercus cerris), aspen, linden (Tilia rubra, subspecies caucasica), and rowan (Sorbus torminalis).

On the south side, the tall juniper and stinking juniper grow along with Turkey oak in places where black pine and Scots pine have been destroyed.

The yew (Taxus baccata) does not grow in clusters like the abovementioned trees, but it occurs singly on both the north and south slopes at heights between 1000-1700 m.

The kasnak oak (Quercus vulcanica) is found around 1700 m on the north side, on the upper reaches of the Murat river.

In deforested areas between 1400-1500 m, particularly around the Kizce and Söbealan plateaus, some herbaceous species such as clover (Trifolium), foxglove (Digitalis), mullein (Verbascum), and spurge (Euphorbia) have become widespread. The presence of clover alongside more bitter species like mullein and spurge, which animals do not eat at lower elevations, indicates that the effects of grazing on these high plateaus has been minimal.

The red pine (Pinus brutia), which is characteristic of the Mediterranean biome, grows on the south-facing side of Murat Dağı at altitudes up to 1000 m, especially in some of the east-west valleys on the south side. In areas where this has been cut down, smaller shrubby species predominate. These include the prickly juniper (Juniperus oxycedrus), kermes oak (Quercus coccifera), mock privet (Phillyrea latifolia), and Jerusalem thorn (Paliurus spina-christi).

As for the underbrush in beech and oak forests, the most common species are cornel (Cornus mas), dwarf elderberry (Sambucus ebulus, supspecies nigra), broad-leaved spindle (Euonymus latifolius), blackberry (Rubus canescens), and hazel (Corylus avellana).

The laurel-leaf rock rose (Cistus laurifolius) starts from the upper limit of red pine growth, around 1100 m, and grows as high up as around 1600 m. It commonly grows in places where oak and black pine have been cut down, as well as in the undergrowth below black pine. On the northwestern side of Murat Dağı, the laurel-leaf rock rose also grows in the undergrowth below red pine.

In some places (especially on the south side of the mountain), where both red pine and larger shrubs have been cut down, an even shorter garrigue-like vegetation is found, characterized by short herbaceous plants, no taller than knee height. These include prickly thrift (Acantholimon sp.), pink rock rose (Cistus creticus), and prickly burnet (Sarcopoterium spinosum). According to Recep Efe, these are primarily steppe plants, and their presence here is because of anthropogenic effects — the area gets plenty of rainfall and is sufficiently humid to support thirstier plants, but the steppe plants must have colonized this area after the usual forest and shrub plants were cut down.

=== Subalpine zone ===
On the southwest of Murat Dağı, the forest zone goes up to 1800 m; on the northwest side, it goes up to 1900 m. Above this is a narrow band of subalpine habitat, where short, cold-resistant trees grow. These mostly consist of dwarf juniper (Juniperus communis, subspecies nana) and olive-leafed laurel (Daphne oleoides). The olive-leafed laurel grows only up to 2000 m; above that, only the dwarf juniper is found. Dwarf juniper is mainly concentrated on the mountain's northern and western sides; elsewhere, a more meadow-like foliage predominates. These include species like Marrubium astracanicum, Alyssum virgatum, Festuca pinifolia, Alyssum mouradicum, Verbascum phrygium, and Campanula phrygia.

In higher-altitude deforested areas, the prickly thrift (Acantholimon puberulum) and mullein (Verbascum phrygium) are common, especially in the areas around Çukurören, Sığırkuyru, and Kesiksöğüt.

== Wildlife ==
Murat Dağı is a breeding ground for several large birds, including the bearded vulture (Gypaetus barbatus; 2-4 known breeding pairs), black vulture (Aegypius monachus; 1 known breeding pair), and golden eagle (Aquila chrysaetos). Its status as a breeding ground for the black vulture is threatened by ongoing logging activity.

Other breeding birds include the red-backed shrike (Lanius collurio), the ortolan bunting (Emberiza hortulana), the middle spotted woodpecker (Dendrocoptes medius), the European nightjar (Caprimulgus europaeus), and the long-legged buzzard (Buteo rufinus).

Two species of regionally endangered butterflies are found on the mountain: Archon apollinus (the false Apollo) and Euphydryas orientalis.
