= Biga =

Biga may refer to:

== Places ==
- Biga, Çanakkale, a town and district of Çanakkale Province in Turkey
- Sanjak of Biga, an Ottoman province
- Biga Çayı, a river in Çanakkale Province
- Biga Peninsula, a peninsula in Turkey, in the northwest part of Anatolia

== Other uses ==
- Biga (bread baking), a type of pre-fermentation used in Italian baking
- Biga and Busca, two political factions in the 15th century Catalan Civil War
- Biga (typeface)
- Biga (chariot), a two-horse chariot used in ancient Mediterranean countries
- Bigha, a unit of land area used in North India
- Biga language, an Austronesian language of West Papua, Indonesia

== See also ==
- Bigeh, an island in the River Nile
- Biga Ranx (born 1988), French musician
