= Great Offensive =

Turkish offensive during the Turkish War of Independence

- Part of the Greco-Turkish War (1919–22) of the Turkish War of Independence
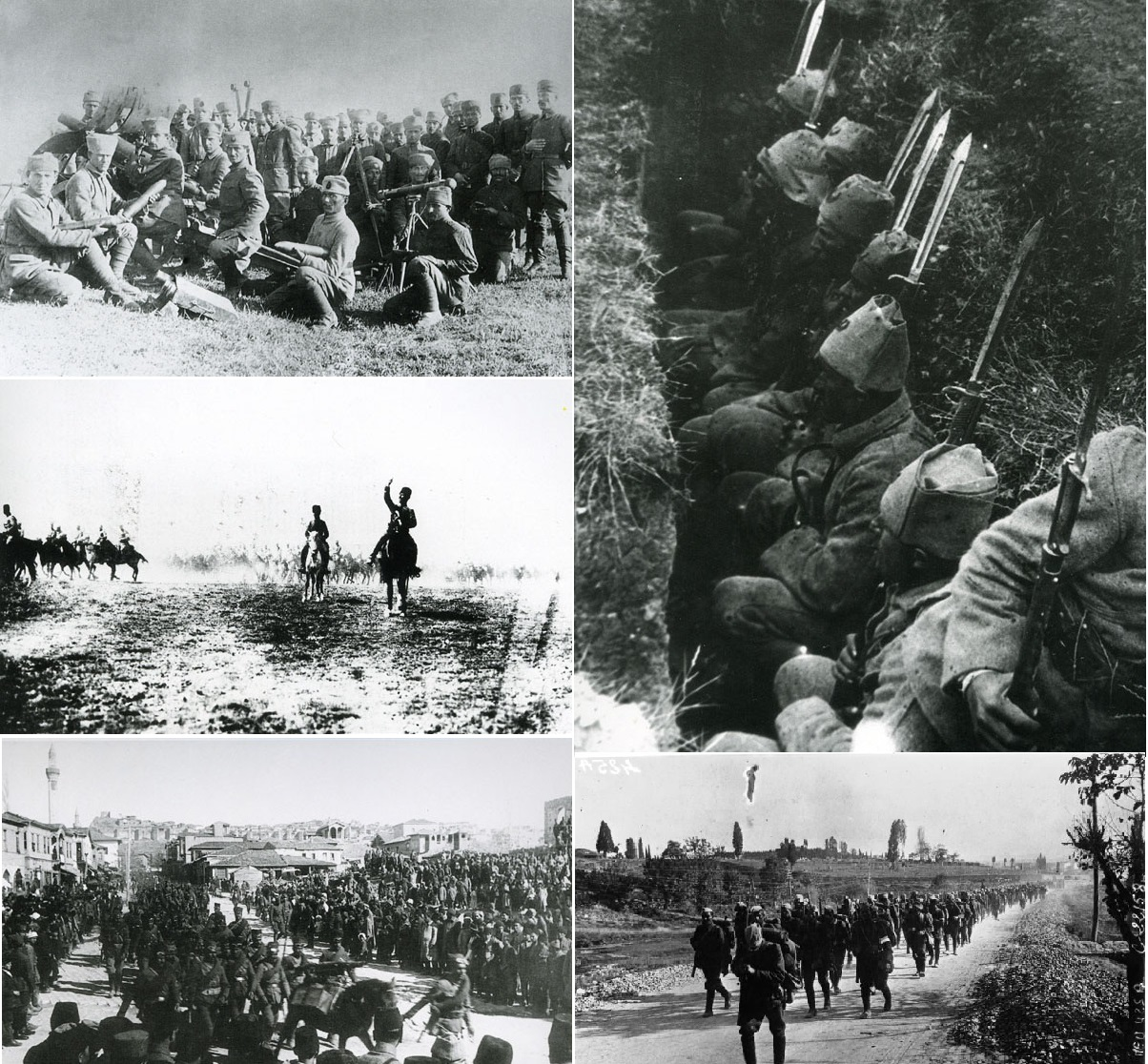
- From the top left: Turkish artillery units, the forward operation of a Turkish cavalry unit during the Battle of Dumlupınar, the last Turkish soldiers to join the attack being sent off from Ulus Square with ceremonies and prayers, Turkish infantry units wait in the trenches for the attack, Greek soldiers on backward way.
Date	26 August – 18 September 1922
Location	Western Anatolia (Afyon, Kütahya, Uşak, İzmir)
Result	Turkish victory: Armistice of Mudanya; Chanak crisis
Territorial changes	Turkish capture of Smyrna; Greek Army withdrawal from Western Anatolia

Belligerents
Ankara Government	(Kingdom of Greece) Greece

Commanders and leaders
Mustafa Kemal Pasha; Fevzi Pasha; İsmet Pasha	(Kingdom of Greece) Georgios Hatzianestis (Kingdom of Greece) Nikolaos Trikoupis (POW) (Kingdom of Greece) Kimon Digenis (POW) (Kingdom of Greece) Athanasios Sakettas †

Strength
207,942 personnel 100,352 rifles 2,025 light machine guns 839 heavy machine guns 323 artillery pieces	225,001 personnel 90,000 rifles 3,139 light machine guns 1,280 heavy machine guns 418 artillery pieces

Casualties and losses
2,318–2,358 killed 9,360–10,581 wounded/hospitalized 1,695–1,697 missing 57–101 captured Total: 12,000–18,000 casualties	Unknown, possibly: 18,250 killed 16,750 wounded and missing 35,000–40,000 prisoners 284 cannons 2,000 machine guns 15 aircraft Total: 75,000+ casualties
- c. up to 200,000 Christian civilians killed c. 1,000 Muslim civilians killed

The Great Offensive (Turkish: Büyük Taarruz) was the largest and final military operation of the Turkish War of Independence, fought between the Turkish Armed Forces loyal to the government of the Grand National Assembly of Turkey, and the Kingdom of Greece, ending the Greco-Turkish War. The offensive began on 26 August 1922 with the Battle of Dumlupınar. From 31 August to 9 September, the front moved a distance of 300 km (190 mi) as the Greek troops retreated. The Turkish army lacked motorized vehicles; its forces consisted of infantry and cavalry units, and logistical support was provided by a supply system based on ox carts.

The Turkish troops reached the sea on 9 September with the capture of İzmir. The operation ended on 18 September 1922 with the capture of Erdek and Biga. The staggering defeat caused great dissent within the Greek army and a general loss of morale, which led to an unwillingness to continue fighting. On top of this, numerous Greek divisions had been encircled and destroyed as effective fighting units, which meant that the Greek army had lost its offensive capabilities and was unable to organize a controlled retreat, leading to numerous Greek POWs.

== Advance ==
The offensive started with the Battle of Dumlupınar, where the Turkish army defeated the Greek army within four days, paving the way for a rapid offensive. After Mustafa Kemal Atatürk's order issued in the Forces of the Grand National Assembly of Turkey, the main part of the Turkish Army began moving toward İzmir and a secondary force began moving from Eskişehir toward Bursa. The commander-in-chief of the Greek forces in Asia Minor, Nikolaos Trikoupis, surrendered on 29 August. On 7 September, Aydın, Germencik and Kuşadası fell to Turkish control. On 16 September, the last Greek troops left Çeşme, and two days later the Greek III Corps left Erdek. The British Chief of Staff expressed his admiration for the Turkish military operation.

== Atrocities ==
During its retreat across western Anatolia toward Smyrna, the Greek army carried out a scorched-earth policy, burning towns and villages—including Uşak, Alaşehir, and Manisa—and committing atrocities against Turkish villagers. It is estimated that about 1,000 Muslims were killed, in total, during the entire retreat.

On the other hand, the collapse of the Greek Army exposed the Christian inhabitants of Anatolia to Turkish nationalist atrocities. During the latter's advance, they burned Greek and Armenian houses, deporting and massacring thousands of Christian inhabitants. The Burning of Smyrna and its aftermath cost up to 180,000 civilian lives, mostly Greeks, but also a smaller number of Armenians. It is also estimated that Turkish forces murdered 7,000 Greek civilians in Akhisar, 6,000 in Pergamon, 4,000 in Turgutlu, 2,000 in Çandarlı, 600 in Balya Maden, 200 in Çoruk, over 100 in Bademli and "several hundred" in Moschonisi.

== Gallery ==
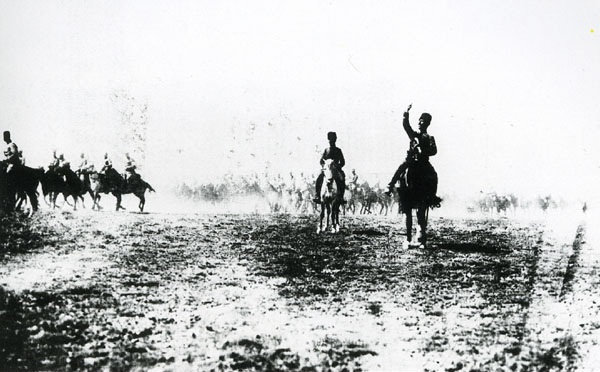
Turkish cavalry during a mopping-up operation

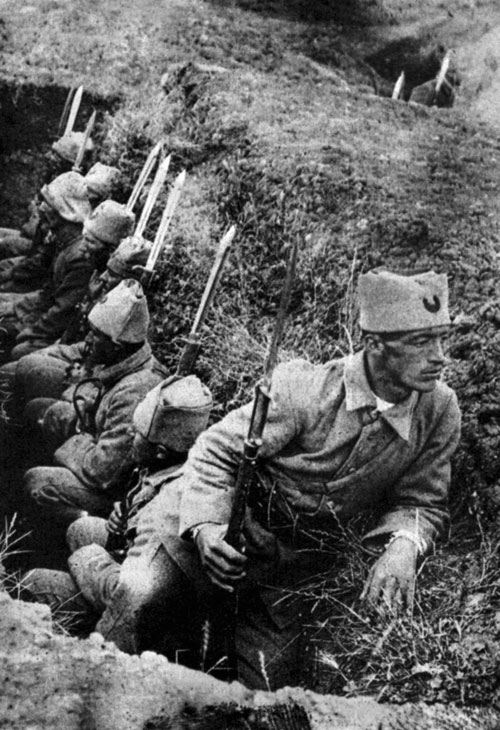
Turkish infantry in a trench

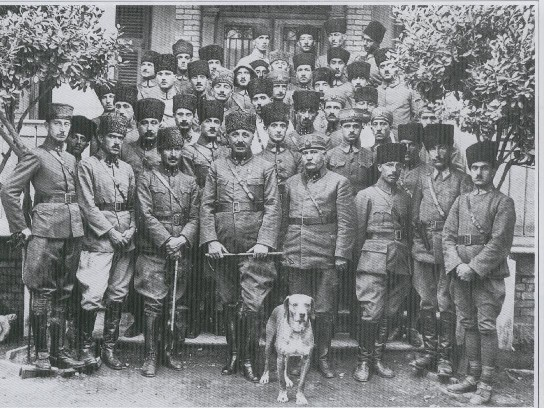
Fahrettin Altay and V Cavalry Corps officers

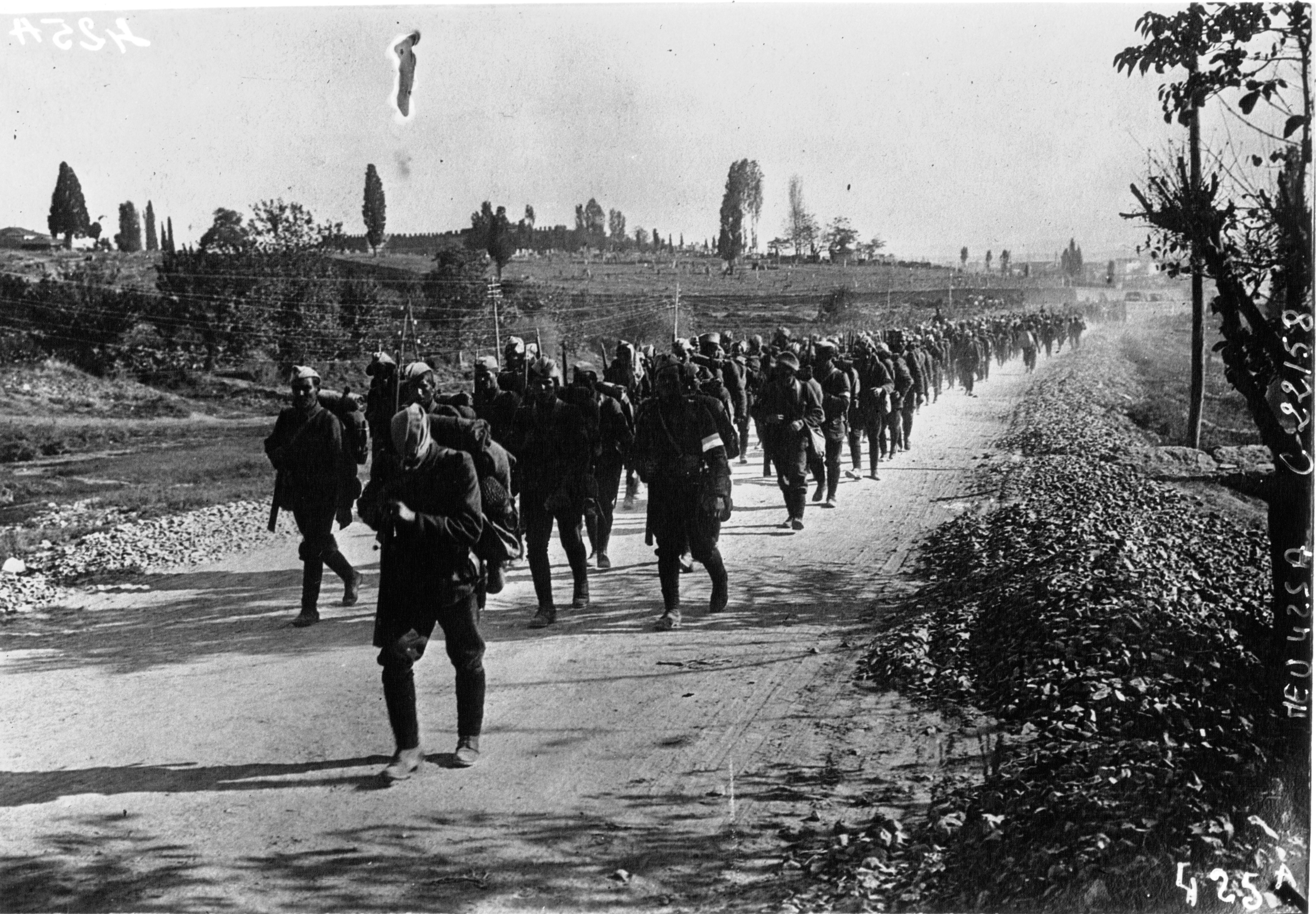
Greek soldiers retreating

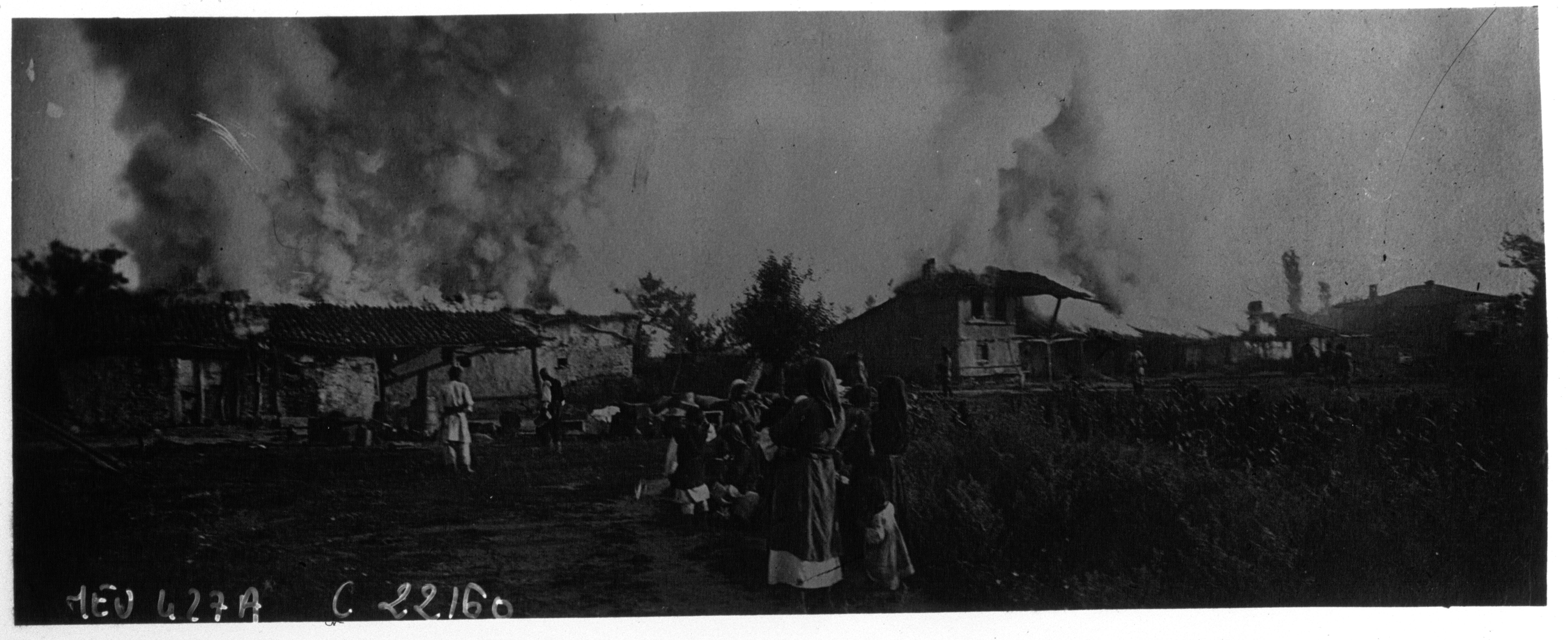
A Turkish village burnt by retreating Greek troops

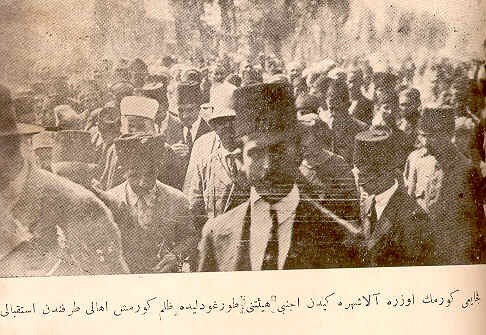
Inspection of the burned town of Turgutlu by a group of dignitaries and journalists

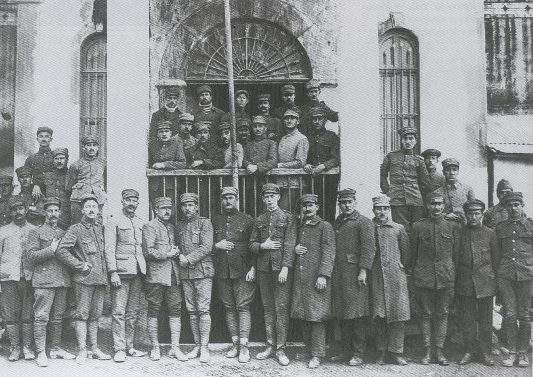
Greek POW officers in Ankara

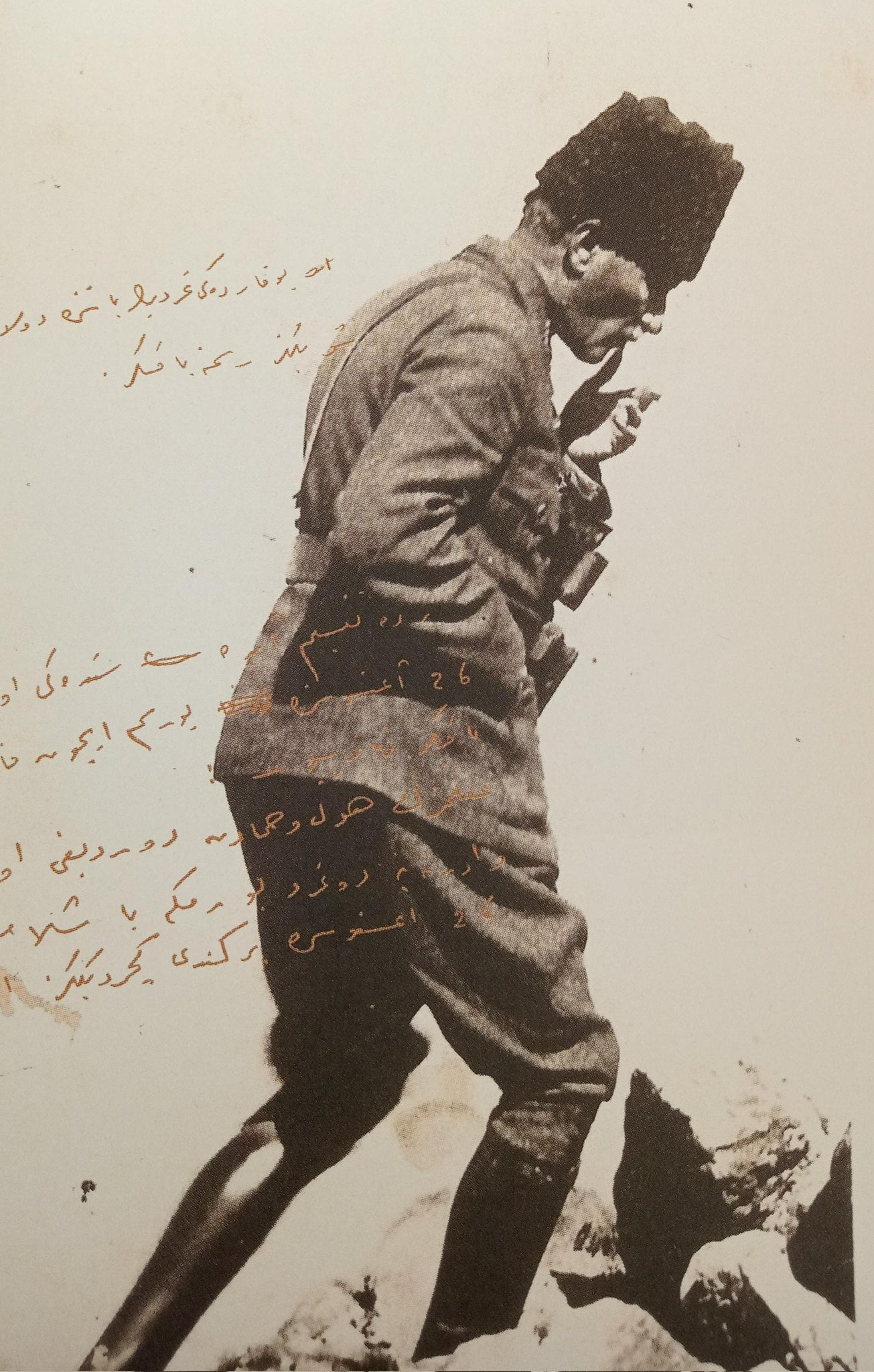
Mustafa Kemal Pasha at Kocatepe hill, Afyonkarahisar

== See also ==
- List of high-ranking commanders of the Turkish War of Independence
- Occupation of Smyrna
- Great Fire of Smyrna
- Great Thessaloniki Fire

== Bibliography ==
- Kemal Niş, Reşat Söker, Türk İstiklâl Harbi, Batı Cephesi, Büyük Taarruz’da Takip Harekâtı (31 Ağustos – 18 Eylül 1922), Cilt 2, Kısım. 6, 3. Kitap, Genkurmay Başkanlığı Basımevi, Ankara, 1969. (in Turkish)
- İsmet Görgülü, Büyük Taarruz: 70 nci Yıl Armağanı, Genelkurmay Başkanlığı Basımevi, Ankara, 1992. (in Turkish)
- Celal Erikan, Komutan Atatürk, Cilt I-II, Üçüncü Basım, Türkiye İş Bankası Kültür Yayınları, İstanbul, 2001, ISBN 975-458-288-2. (in Turkish)
