= Battle of Dumlupınar =

1922 battle during the Greco-Turkish War

- Part of the Great Offensive of the Greco-Turkish War of 1919–1922
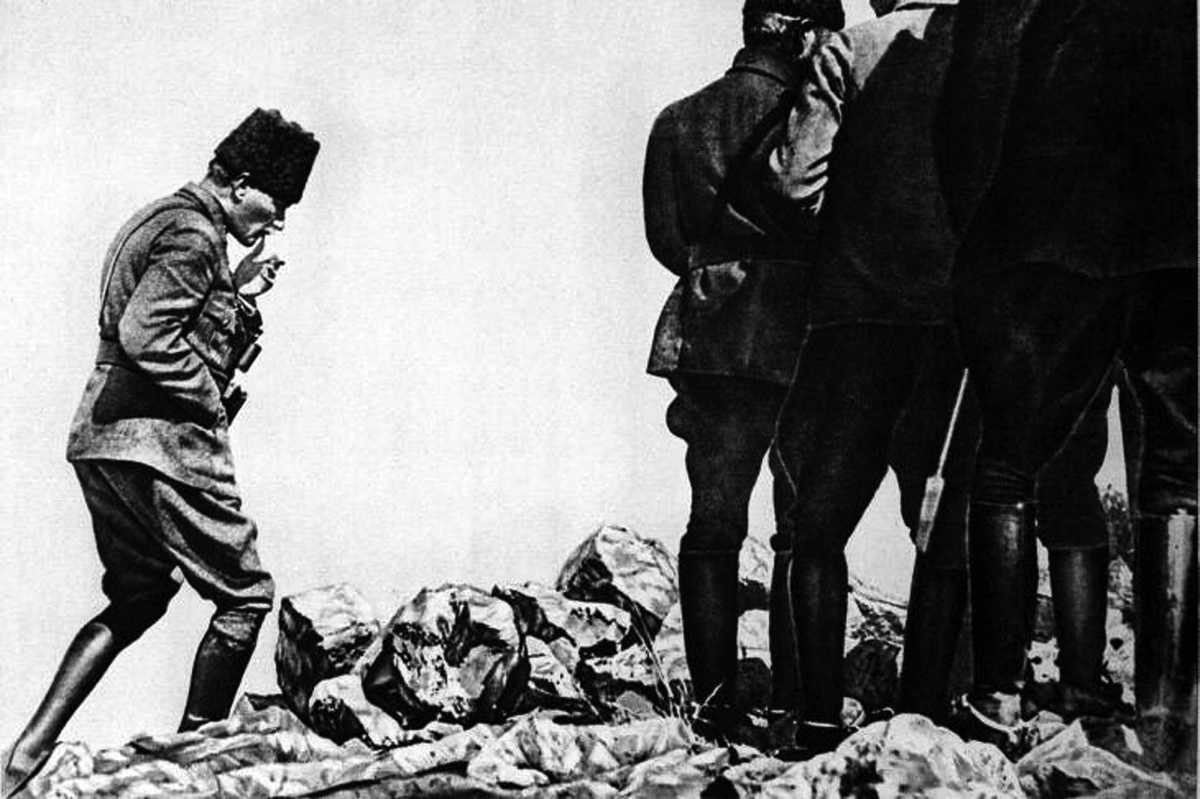
- Mustafa Kemal Pasha at Kocatepe, Afyonkarahisar
Date	26–30 August 1922
Location	Near Dumlupınar, Kütahya and Afyonkarahisar, Turkey
Result	Turkish victory

Belligerents
(Ottoman Empire) Ankara Government	(Kingdom of Greece) Greece

Commanders and leaders
Mustafa Kemal Pasha; Fevzi Pasha; Ismet Pasha	Georgios Hatzianestis; Nikolaos Trikoupis (POW); Kimon Digenis (POW); Petros Soumilas; Athanasios Sakettas †

Units involved
Order of battle	Order of battle

Strength
207,942 personnel 100,352 rifles 2,025 light machine guns 839 heavy machine guns 323 artillery pieces	225,001 personnel 90,000 rifles 3,139 light machine guns 1,280 heavy machine guns 418 artillery pieces

Casualties and losses
Turkish IV Corps only: 2,320 killed 6,996 wounded Total: 9,316	8,000 killed 2,000 wounded 2,000 captured 141 artillery 250 motorized vehicles Total: 12,000

The Battle of Dumlupınar (Greek: Μάχη του Τουμλού Μπουνάρ, romanized: Máchi tou Toumloú Bounár, Turkish: Dumlupınar (Meydan) Muharebesi, lit. 'Dumlupınar (Field) Battle'), also known as the Field Battle of the Commander-in-Chief (Turkish: Başkumandanlık Meydan Muharebesi) in Turkey, was one of the important battles in the Greco-Turkish War (1919–1922) (part of the Turkish War of Independence). The battle was fought from 26 to 30 August 1922 near Dumlupınar, Kütahya in Turkey.

== Background ==
Following the attrition battle on the Sakarya River (Battle of Sakarya) in August–September 1921, the Greek Army of Asia Minor under General Anastasios Papoulas retreated to a defensive line extending from the town of İzmit (ancient Nicomedia) to the towns of Eskişehir and Kara Hisâr-ı Sahib (present-day Afyonkarahisar). The Greek line formed a 700 km arc stretching in a north–south direction along difficult hilly ground with high hills, called tepes, rising out of broken terrain and was considered to be easily defensible. A single-track railway line ran from Kara Hisâr to Dumlupınar, a fortified valley town some 30 miles (48 km) west of Kara Hisâr surrounded by the mountains Murat Dağı and Ahır Dağı, and thence to İzmir (ancient Smyrna) on the coast. This railway was the main supply route of the Greeks. The Greek headquarters at Smyrna was effectively incapable of communicating with the front or exercising operational control.

== Preparations ==
The morale of the Greek troops was low, as many had already been under arms for several years, and there was no prospect for a quick resolution of the war. Political dissent and the fact that they were occupying unfriendly territories further depressed their morale.

Despite pressure to attack building up at Ankara, Mustafa Kemal who had been appointed Commander-in-Chief of the TBMM government, waited and utilized the breathing space to strengthen his forces and split the Allies through adroit diplomatic moves, ensuring that French and Italian sympathies lay with the Turks rather than the Greeks. This isolated in terms of diplomacy the pro-Greek British.

He finally decided to strike the Greeks in August 1922. Knowing that Turkish forces were only adequate to mount one major offensive, he strengthened the Turkish First Army under "Sakallı" Nureddin Pasha, which was deployed against the southern flank of the Greek salient jutting out to Kara Hisâr. This was a gamble, because if the Greek Army counter-attacked on his weakened right flank and pivoted south, his forces would be cut off.

=== Opposing forces ===
==== Greek forces ====
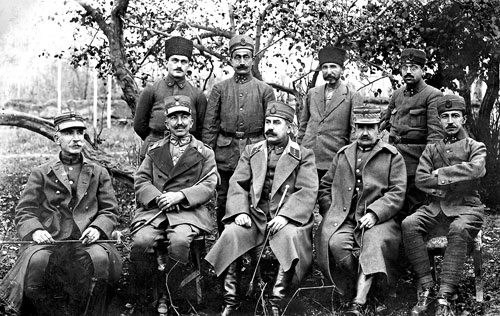
Greek senior officers at the Kırşehir POW camp: from left to right; Colonel Dimitrios Dimaras (commander of 4th Division), Major General Nikolaos Trikoupis (commander of I Corps), Staff Colonel Adnan or Kemaleddin Sami, Major General Kimon Digenis (commander of II Corps) and Lieutenant Emin.

The Greek forces were organized in the "Army of Asia Minor", under Lieutenant General Georgios Hatzianestis, with a total of 220,000 men in 12 infantry and 1 cavalry division. The Army HQ was located in Smyrna. The Army of Asia Minor comprised three Corps (I, II and III), under Major General Nikolaos Trikoupis (I Corps in Kara Hisâr), Major General Kimon Digenis (II Corps in Gazligöl) and Major General Petros Soumilas (III Corps in Eskişehir). It also included an independent Cavalry division and smaller regiment-sized Military Commands, mainly for interior protection and anti-guerrilla operations. The total Greek front spanned 713 km.

Each Greek corps had four divisions. Ι Corps consisted of the 1st, 4th, 5th and 12th divisions. II Corps consisted of the 2nd, 7th, 9th and 13th divisions. III Corps consisted of the 3rd, 10th, 11th and the "Independent" divisions. Each Greek division had 2–4 three-battalion regiments and 8–42 artillery pieces (artillery was redistributed between front-line and reserve divisions). Although numerically strong, the Greeks were very deficient in heavy artillery (only 40 outdated pieces existed in the entire front) and cavalry (one half-company per division).

==== Turkish forces ====
The Turkish forces were organized in the Western Front, under Mustafa Kemal Pasha, with a total of 208,000 men in 18 infantry and five cavalry divisions. For the purposes of the offensive, the Western Front HQ was located on Koca Tepe hill, some 15 km south of Kara Hisâr, very close to the battle lines. The Western Front consisted of the First Army under Mirliva Nureddin Pasha, based also on Koca Tepe hill, the Second Army under Mirliva Yakub Shevki Pasha (Subaşı) based in Doğlat, the Kocaeli Group under Colonel Halid Bey (Karsıalan), and the V Cavalry Corps under Mirliva Fahreddin Pasha (Altay).

For the purpose of the offensive, the Turkish command redistributed its forces, reinforcing the First Army. The First Army consisted of the I Corps (14th, 15th, 23rd, and 57th infantry divisions), the II Corps (3rd, 4th, and 7th infantry divisions), and the IV Corps (5th, 8th, 11th, and 12th infantry divisions). The Second Army consisted of the III Corps (Porsuk detachment (regiment) and 41st division), the VI Corps (16th and 17th infantry divisions plus one provisional cavalry division), and the independent 1st and 61st infantry divisions. The Kocaeli Group consisted of the 18th infantry division plus additional infantry and cavalry units. The V Cavalry Corps consisted of the 1st, 2nd, and 14th cavalry divisions. Each Turkish infantry division consisted of one assault infantry battalion, three three-battalion infantry regiments, and 12 artillery pieces, with an average total strength of 7,500 men.

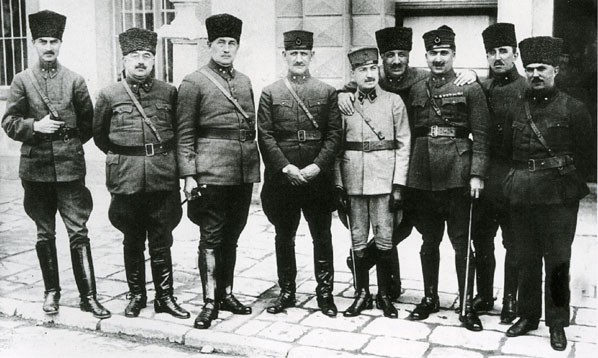
Commanders of Turkish Army, from left to right: Mirliva Âsım (Gündüz), Mirliva Ali Hikmet (Ayerdem), Ferik Ali Sait (Akbaytogan), Mirliva Şükrü Naili (Gökberk), Mirliva Kazım (İnanç), Ferik Fahreddin (Altay), Mirliva Kemalettin Sami (Gökçen), Mirliva Cafer Tayyar (Eğilmez), Mirliva İzzettin (Çalışlar).

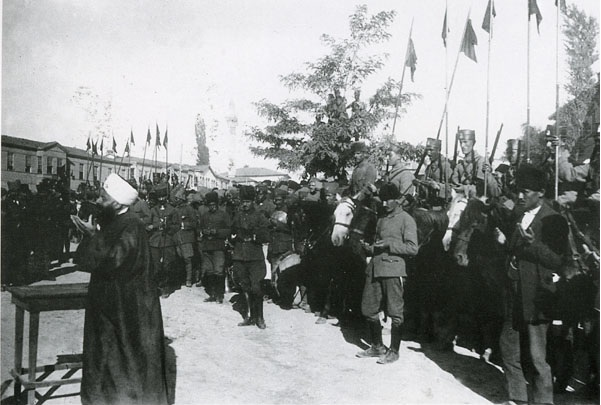
Turkish soldiers at prayer during Eid al-Adha before going to the front on 4 August 1922, Ulus Square, Ankara.

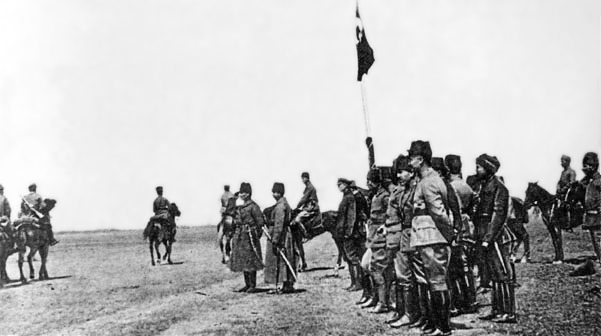
Mustafa Kemal and İsmet İnönü inspecting a military exercise of the Turkish First Army at Ilgin on 1 April 1922.

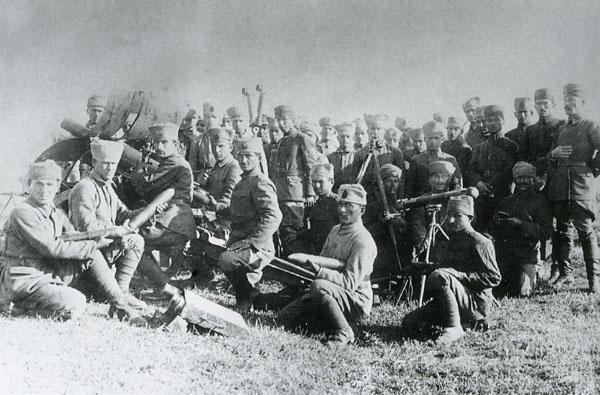
Turkish artillerymen before the Great Smyrna Offensive (Büyük Taarruz), August 1922.

=== Opposing plans ===
==== Turkish plan ====
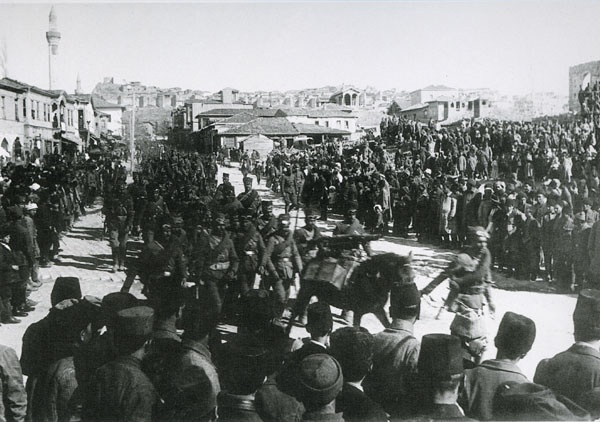
Turkish troops marching in the Ulus Square, Ankara on 15 August 1922.

The Turkish plan was to launch converging attacks with the 1st and 2nd Armies against the Greek positions around Kara Hisâr. The First Army would attack northwards, on the Greek positions southwest of Kara Hisâr, held by the Greek A' Corps. The V Cavalry Corps would assist the First Army by infiltrating through less guarded Greek positions in Kirka valley, and coming behind the Greek front lines. The Second Army would attack westwards, on the Greek positions north of Kara Hisâr.

The first objective was to cut the Smyrna-Kara Hisâr and the Kara Hisâr-Eskişehir railroad lines, thus cutting off the Greek forces in and around Kara Hisâr from Smyrna and the C' Corps in Eskişehir. In a second phase the 1st and 2nd Armies would meet in the area south of Kütahya, closing a ring around the Greek forces in Kara Hisâr and completely encircling them.

==== Greek plan ====
The Greek high command had anticipated a major Turkish offensive, it was however uncertain of the exact direction it would come. The Greeks expected the Turkish attack to come either along the Ankara-Eskişehir railroad line or the Konya-Kara Hisâr railroad line. Unknown to them at the time, the railroad from Ankara, that the Greeks destroyed in summer 1921 during the withdrawal after the battle of Sakarya, was still not restored and was not operational. Following the withdrawal from the Sakarya, initially the Greek Corps' commands were disbanded, and the Asia Minor Army was organised into two groups, the North and South groups, each sufficiently strong to fight independently and repel any Turkish attack. Following the replacement of the Army's commander, and the coming of Lt. General Georgios Hatzianestis the Greek disposition changed. Hatzianestis re-established the three Corps commands. All three Corps controlled parts of the front, but in essence the B' corps operated as a general reserve, while the I (around Kara Hisâr) and III (around Eskisehir) Corps were mostly deployed on the front.

In the case of a Turkish offensive the II Corps would fall under the command of the sector which was attacked (either I Corps to the south or III Corps to the north). Hatzianestis, despite reports indicating the opposite, believed that the Greek front-lines were sufficiently strong to withstand any Turkish attack for enough time that the B' Corps would launch its own flanking counterattack, on the flanks of the attacking Turkish armies.

Prior to the Turkish offensive Greek intelligence had revealed the Turkish preparations, but it failed to estimate correctly the size of the Turkish formations and the exact date of the Turkish attack. When the Turkish attack opened Greek reinforcements were still underway to the front.

== Battle ==
=== Turkish attack and breakthrough (26–27 August 1922) ===
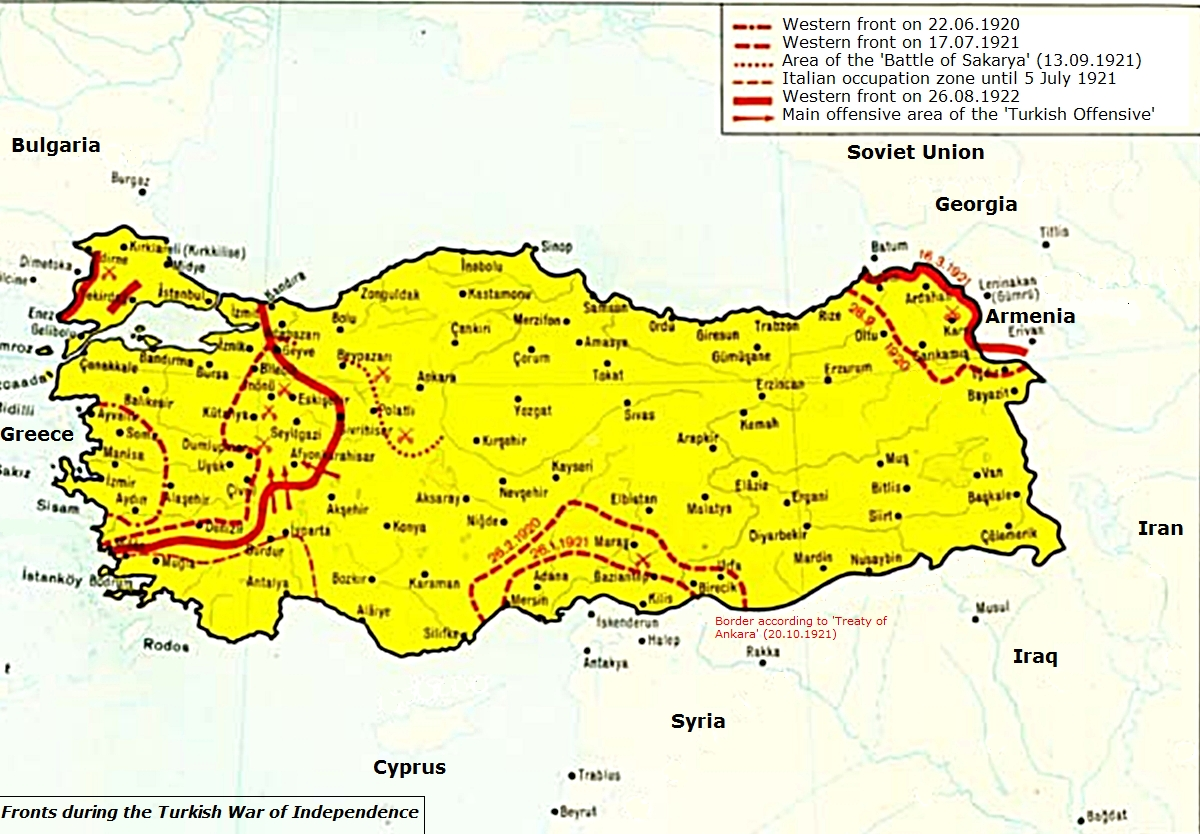
Map showing the situation on the western front on the eve of the Turkish Offensive on 26 August 1922.

The Turkish attack opened in the night of 25–26 August 1922, when the Turkish V Cavalry Corps passed through the Kirka gorge behind the Greek lines. The gorge was guarded by a patrolling Greek rifle company, which was easily overrun by the advancing Turkish cavalry. The Turkish cavalry proceeded to cut the Greek telegraph lines and the railway line (by 18:00 hours on 26 August both had been cut), thus seriously hampering communications between Smyrna and Kara Hisâr.

On the morning of 26 August the Turkish First and Second Armies attacked simultaneously. The Second Army's attack, following a powerful artillery barrage, took the Greeks by surprise and was able to take some front line positions of the 5th Greek division (of the Greek I Corps). Renewed Turkish attacks had little success. After being reinforced, the Greek 5th division carried limited counterattacks and restored its original front. The Second Army also attacked the positions of the III Corps keeping its forces pinned, thus preventing it from the reinforcing the II Corps.

The First Army's attack was preceded by a devastating and accurate artillery barrage. The much superior Turkish heavy artillery knocked out the light Greek batteries, and caused heavy casualties to the front-line Greek infantry battalions (some lost up to 50% of their strength during the artillery barrage alone due to inadequate trenches). The artillery barrage was followed by a general Turkish attack by 7 infantry divisions of the I and IV Corps, against 2 Greek divisions (1st and 4th). The situation for the Greek Ι Corps became almost immediately critical, as they faced overwhelming forces and soon all Corps' reserves were committed to battle. The Turkish attack was focused mainly on the seam of the Greek 1st and 4th divisions. By noon the Turkish I Corps had succeeded in carrying the Greek 1st division's trenches. The arrival as a reinforcement of the II Corps' 7th division in the afternoon prompted a Greek counterattack which was able to only partially restore the line.

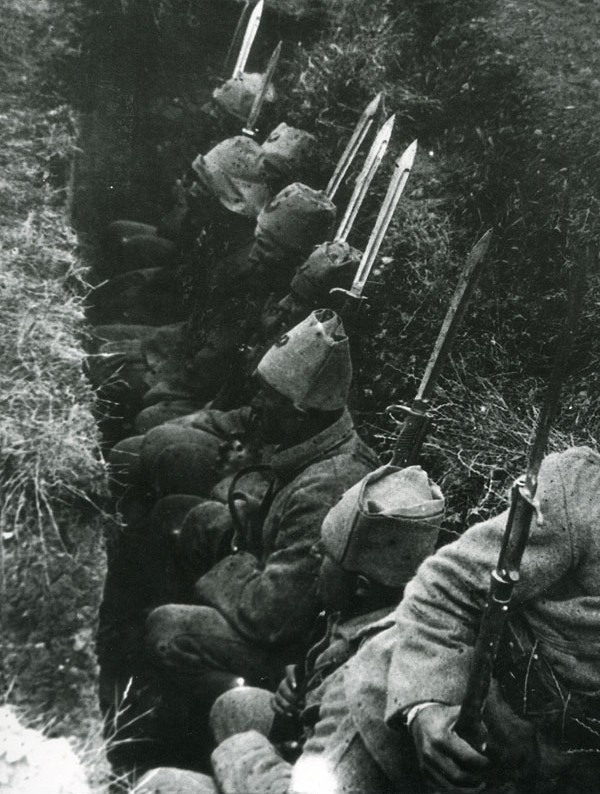
Turkish soldiers in a trench waiting for the order to attack with fixed bayonets on their rifles while the artillery lays down preparatory fire.

The Greek Army HQ in Smyrna had no clear picture of the situation. In its order at 23:00 hours on 26 August to the I and II Corps the Army expressed the opinion that the Turks had still not revealed the main axis of their offensive. The Army proceeded with its original plan, by ordering the Greek II Corps to prepare for a counteroffensive on the Turkish right flank, while the I Corps would keep its positions. The counter-offensive was expected to be launched on 28 August. These orders directly conflicted with the orders that the I Corps had already issued to the II Corps, and subsequently the I Corps ordered the II Corps to stop any preparations for a counteroffensive and resume sending its forces south to reinforce the badly battered 1st and 4th divisions. Due to the broken communications, the Army HQ in Smyrna didn't receive the notifications of the I and II Corps and had the impression that things developed as it had ordered.

At 02:00 hours on 27 August (Day 2 of the Turkish offensive) Turkish artillery began its barrage again, and at 06:00 hours Turkish infantry resumed its attacks. The Turkish forces focused again on the seam of the Greek 1st and 4th divisions, and advancing steadily they managed by 09:00 hours to achieve a clear breakthrough in the Greek line when the Turkish IV Corps under Colonel Sami took the 5,000-foot-high (1,500 m) peak of Erkmentepe (38°44′36.2″N 30°28′32.1″E). At 10:30 hours the Greek Ι Corps issued an order of general withdrawal some 20 km to the north of its original line, and the subsequent evacuation of Kara Hisâr. The order was not received by the Greek 1st division, whose telephone contact with the Ι Corps had been cut and couldn't establish wireless communication, and remained in position. By 13:30 hours its front was collapsing exposing the flank of the 4th division. The 1st division, together with the 7th division retreated without being seriously harassed by the Turks, and by 17:00 hours they had reached their new positions.

=== Greek retreat towards Dumlupınar and Alıören (27–29 August 1922) ===
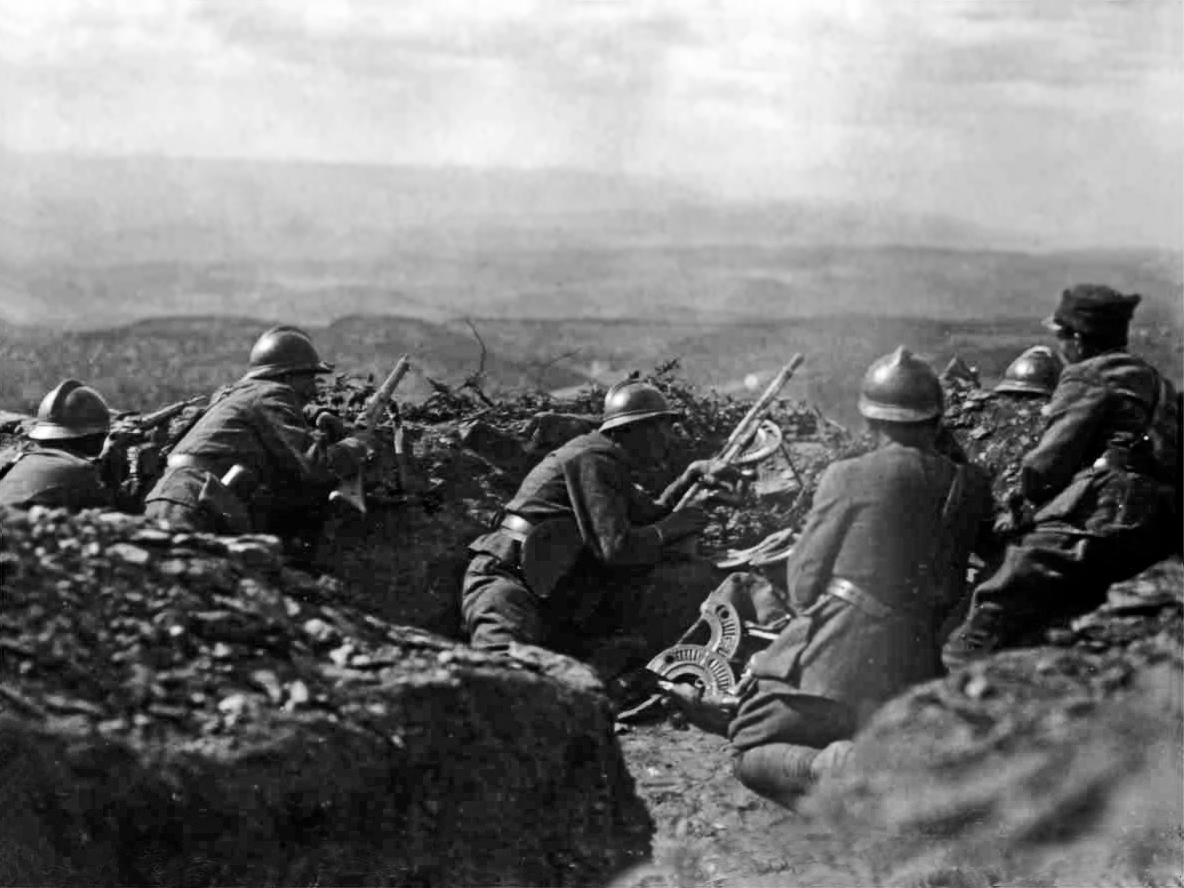
Greek soldiers on 29 August, west of Afyonkarahisar.

The commander of the 1st Greek division, Major General Frangou, received contact with the I Corps at 18:30 hours, via messengers. However he was only informally informed, and received no written orders. Frangou ordered his forces (1st and 7th divisions and other smaller units, henceforth referred to as "Frangou Group") to withdraw towards Dumlupınar in the night from 27 to 28 August, assuming this was the plan of I Corps commander Major General Trikoupis. In fact Trikoupis had kept his forces (the biggest part of I and II Corps, henceforth referred as "Trikoupis Group") in position, allowing his men to rest in the night, and preparing for the withdrawal towards Dumlupınar in the next morning of 28 August (Day 3 of the Turkish offensive). The result of this confusion was that a gap opened in the Greek line between Frangou and Trikoupis Groups. The forces of Frangou Group marching in the night withdrew towards Dumlupınar, but in poor order, while desertions began.

The Army HQ in Smyrna was losing touch with the situation. In its orders at 17:30 hours on 27 August, it ordered the I Corps to counterattack and restore its original line, or if unable, to conduct a fighting withdrawal, while the II Corps would counterattack immediately towards Çobanlar (southeast of Kara Hisâr). Similarly the I Corps with no communication with Frangou Group was not aware that Frangou Group was moving on its own, and gave orders that did not correspond to the actual situation on the field. At 02:00 hours on 28 August the Army of Asia Minor HQ cancelled the previous orders for counterattack, and placed the II Corps as well as a division from the III Corps under the Ι Corps and Major General Trikoupis.

At 05:00 hours on 28 August Trikoupis Group began its movement to the west. Unaware of the absence of Frangou Group's units, the Greek 4th division's exposed column was attacked at 07:00 and taken by surprise, and subsequently broken. The Greek 9th division (so far uncommitted to battle), on its way to the west at about 07:00 trapped the Turkish 2nd Cavalry division (of the V Turkish Cavalry Corps), which tried to block the way to the west, and inflicted heavy casualties on it, including prisoners and artillery pieces. Subsequently, the 2nd Cavalry division was withdrawn from action and was put in reserve. The rest of Trikoupis Group (5th, 12th and 13th divisions) retreated to the west without problems. Trikoupis Group spent the night of 28–29 August around Olucak (38°55′57.3″N 30°13′38.5″E).

At the same time the Frangou Group was under pressure by the incoming Turkish IV Corps. Frangou's units were deployed in line around Başkimse (38°51′48.8″N 30°12′10.7″E). After repeated failed efforts to establish wireless communication with the Greek I Corps Frangou ordered his units to begin their withdrawal to Dumlupınar position at 16:00 hours. At 05:00 hours on 29 August all units of Frangou Group had reached the positions around Dumlupınar, in good order despite the pressure of the Turkish IV corps.

=== The battle of Hamurköy-İlbulak Dağ (29 August 1922) ===
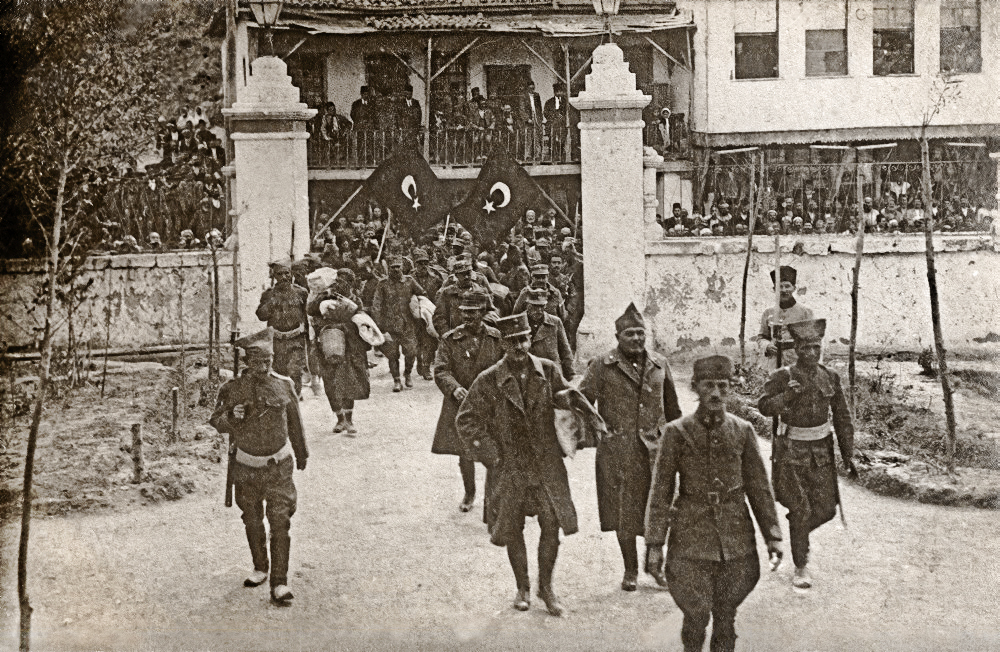
General Kimon Digenis with his soldiers being led away following their capture.

During the night of 28–29 August the Turkish VI Corps (of the Second Army) had advanced to the west and reached the north of Trikoupis Group. The Turkish V Cavalry Corps and the First Army's units (I, II and IV Corps) advanced towards the Greek Frangou and Trikoupis Groups. The Turkish I Corps advanced towards Dumlupınar and made contact with the Greek Frangou Group, while the V Cavalry Corps and the IV Corps separated the Greek Trikoupis and Frangou Group. Trikoupis Group was effectively encircled.

Trikoupis Group began its movement westwards on the morning of 29 August. Progressively and unexpectedly Greek units started running into the units of the Turkish V and IV Corps. Trikoupis ordered his 9th division to attack and break the Turkish line, in order to open the way to Dumlupınar. Quickly the Greek 9th division found itself attacking against superior Turkish forces (the 4th Corps) and fell into defense. The Turkish forces attacked also of the eastern flank of Trikoupis Group where the Greek 12th position was. Trikoupis progressively committed the 5th and 4th divisions in the defense of his Group, while keeping the 13th division in reserve. The battle lasted all day on 29 August, with heavy casualties on both sides. Trikoupis Group had been unable to open the way to Dumlupinar or establish communication with Frangou Group. The Turkish forces had similarly been unable to destroy the Trikoupis Group, despite having encircled it with their II, IV, V and VI Corps.

At 23:00 on 29 August, the badly battered Greek units of Trikoupis Group, disengaged and began marching towards Çalköy (38°55′47.7″N 30°04′6.7″E), which was thought to be weakly held by Turkish forces. The Greek units had already lost much of their cohesion, and the night march aggravated the mixing of units. The Greek 5th division lost its way and lost contact with the Trikoupis Group.

The Frangou Group on 29 August held a 20 km front around Dumlupınar. Its position was attacked by the Turkish 1st Corps and the right flank was broken with little fight. In order to leave open a window of hope to the Trikoupis Group to retreat towards Dumlupınar, Frangou ordered his left flank to hold positions at any cost.

=== The battle of Alıören (30 August 1922) ===
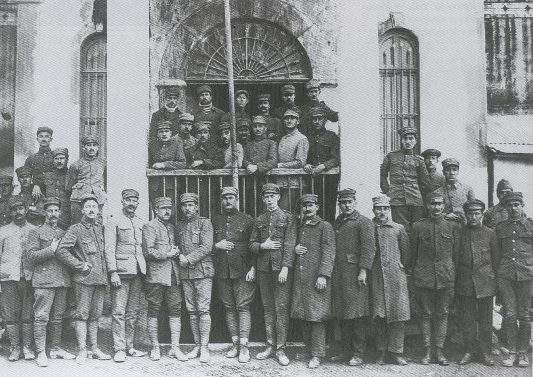
Greek POW officers in Ankara, 29 September 1922.

In the morning of 30 August, after breaking the weak Turkish force blocking the way, the Trikoupis Group arrived in Çalköy, where after 07:00 it began taking fire from Turkish artillery. Turkish columns (the IV, V and VI Corps) were visible marching both south and north of Trikoupis Group. Trikoupis made a council with the commanders of his divisions, who proposed that the Group continue its westward march through Alıören (38°56′47.0″N 29°59′57.3″E) to Banaz. Trikoupis rejected this opinion, and ordered his forces to continue south to Dumlupınar.

At 11:00 hours Trikoupis received the reports from his units, which indicated that the combatant strength of Trikoupis Group was reduced to 7,000 infantry, 80 cavalry and 116 artillery pieces. An additional 10,000–15,000 men were completely disorganised and largely unarmed. Food supplies had already been completely exhausted and ammunition stocks were very low.

After receiving the reports from his subordinate units Trikoupis, realising that his forces were insufficient to withstand a Turkish attack, changed his mind and ordered continuation of the march to Alıören and then Banaz. Even though the road to Alıören was open, Trikoupis had lost invaluable time before ordering the continuation of the march to the west. The Turkish forces had covered much of the northern and southern flank of Trikoupis Group.

At 13:30 hours the marching Greek column found the road to Alıören blocked by Turkish cavalry of the 14th Turkish Cavalry division. Trikoupis ordered his forces to attack and break the Turkish force. A Greek regiment pushed the Turkish cavalry back but new Turkish reinforcements arrived. It became evident that Trikoupis Group could not avoid a general engagement. Trikoupis ordered his divisions to deploy and defend until darkness arrived, when the march would resume.

By 16:00 hours, the Turkish artillery became particularly effective, inflicting heavy casualties to the densely concentrated Greek forces. The Turkish IV Corps exercised heavy pressure from the east and south while the VI Corps attacked from the north. The situation for the Greek units became critical. At dusk the Greek western flank was broken. Large numbers of non-combatants fled to the west. At 20:30 Trikoupis ordered the remnants of his Group to resume the march to the west. All heavy wagons, field artillery and wounded men unable to march were abandoned. Over 2,000 killed Greeks were counted by the Turks the next day in the battlefield, not counting the wounded who died later as a result of their severe wounds. The Trikoupis Group had greatly disintegrated. Its men were completely exhausted, and many were collapsing. Finally Kütahya was captured in this evening.

Trikoupis Group was divided in three columns which tried to march to the west. A column of 2,000 men (mainly from the Greek 12th division) surrendered at 20:00 hours on 1 September to Turkish cavalry units. Trikoupis' column, together with 5,000–6,000 of his men eventually surrendered to the Turkish forces at 17:00 hours on 2 September. A column of 5,000 men managed to escape the Turkish ring, but had lost any combat value. Trikoupis and General Digenis (CO of II Corps) were led to Mustafa Kemal, who informed Trikoupis that he had been appointed as commander-in-chief of the Greek Army in Asia Minor, an episode highlighting the level of confusion in the Greek command.

On 30 August, Frangou Group was also attacked, by the Turkish I Corps. Frangou Group held its positions all day, but at 23:30 its left flank was breached. Frangou ordered his forces to retreat towards Banaz. Thus the battle for Dumlupınar came to an end, and the Greeks began a fighting retreat west, which did not end until they left Asia Minor.

== Outcome ==
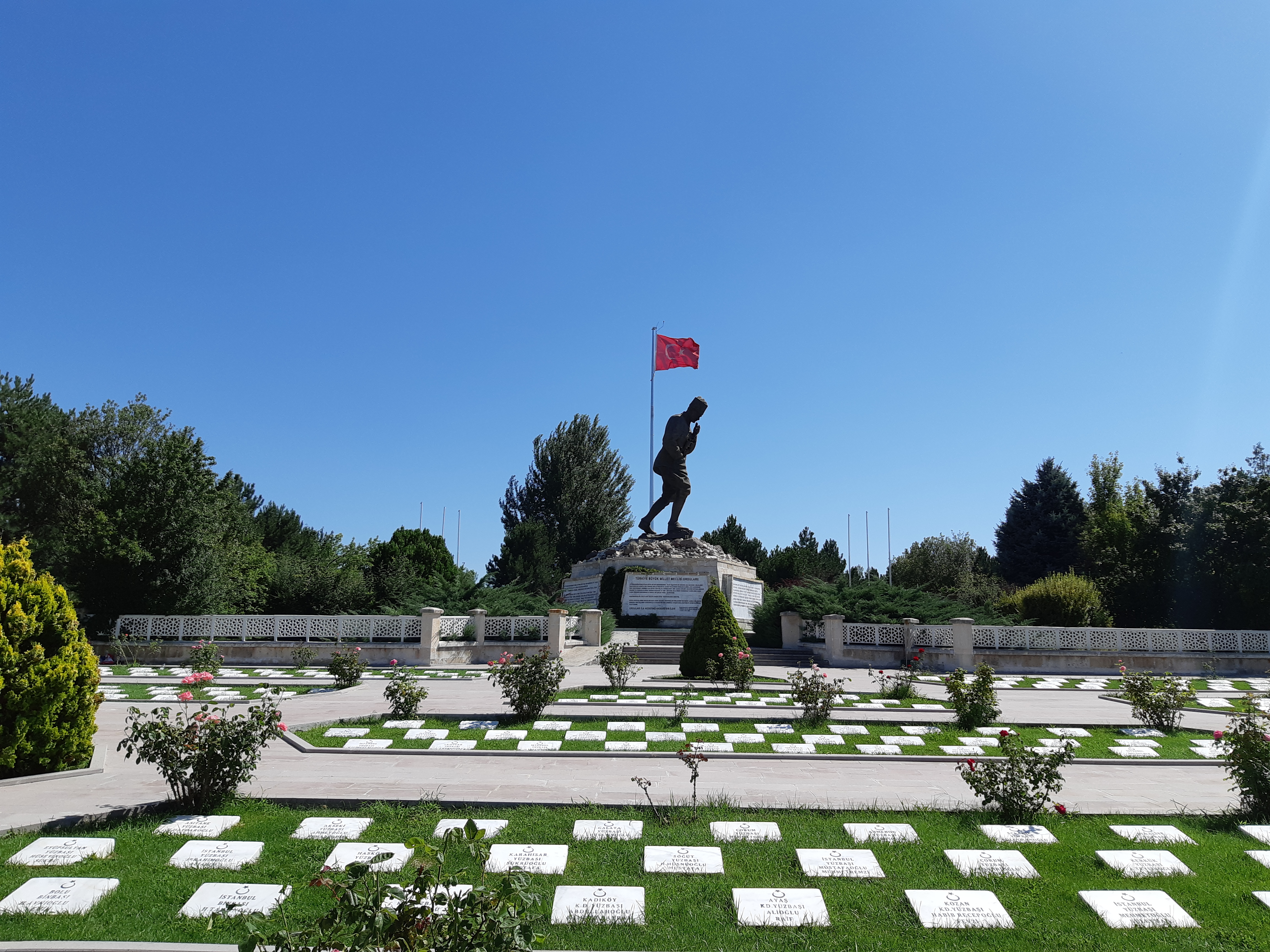
The Great Offensive cemetery, Afyonkarahisar Province.

The end of the battle of Dumlupınar spelt the beginning of the end for the Greek presence in Anatolia. Trikoupis Group, with some 34 infantry battalions and 130 artillery pieces was destroyed as an effective fighting force. The remaining Frangou Group was too weak to hold against the Turkish onslaught. Greek losses were heavy; by 7 September, the Greek Army had suffered 50,000 casualties (35,000 killed and wounded and 15,000 captured). Greek material losses were also heavy. Turkish losses were lower. Between 26 August and 9 September, the Turkish army sustained 13,476 casualties (2,318 killed, 9,360 wounded, 1,697 missing and 101 captured). In two weeks (26 August 1922 – 9 September 1922) the Turkish army re-captured all the territories which the Greek army had invaded since May 1919. The Turks chased the fleeing Greeks 250 miles (400 km) to Smyrna, which was later abandoned by the Greek soldiers. During this period the Greek Army numbered 300,000 men with an additional 100,000 in reserve. According to the Greek Directorate of Army History, during the Greco-Turkish War, the Greek army suffered ~101,000 casualties (24,240 killed 48,880 wounded, 18,095 missing and 10,000 captured) out of a 200,000–250,000-men-strong army stationed in Anatolia. Other sources put the total number of casualties even higher at 120,000–130,000. By 1921 the war in Anatolia had cost Greece a sum equivalent to $100,000,000 at the rate of exchange in 1921. Turkish casualties numbered 13,000 killed (additionally about 24,000 died of disease during and after the war) and 35,000 wounded for the whole Turkish War of Independence.

The last Greek troops, present in Erdek and Biga, left Anatolia on 18 September. The Armistice of Mudanya was signed by Turkey, Italy, France and Great Britain on 11 October 1922. Greece was forced to accede to it on 14 October. To commemorate this victory, 30 August (also liberation day of Kütahya) is celebrated as Victory Day (Zafer Bayramı), a national holiday in Turkey.

== Graves ==
Through research conducted using geophysical ground radar, 304 new graves belonging to the participants of the battle were found in 2022.
