= Dumlupınar, Kütahya =

Dumlupınar
- Municipality
- Location within Turkey Location within Turkey Aegean
- Coordinates: 38°51′N 29°58′E
- Country: Turkey
- Province: Kütahya
- District: Dumlupınar
- Population (2022): 1,214
- Time zone: UTC+3 (TRT)
- Area code: 0274

Dumlupınar is a town in Kütahya Province in the Aegean region of Turkey. It is the seat of Dumlupınar District. Its population is 1,214 (2022). It was the site of the 1921 Battle of Aslıhanlar–Dumlupınar and the 1922 Battle of Dumlupınar.

== Image gallery ==
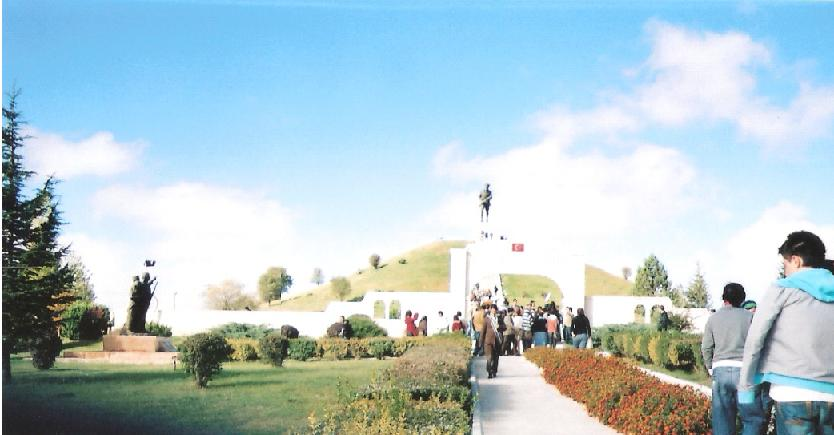
Battle of Dumlupınar

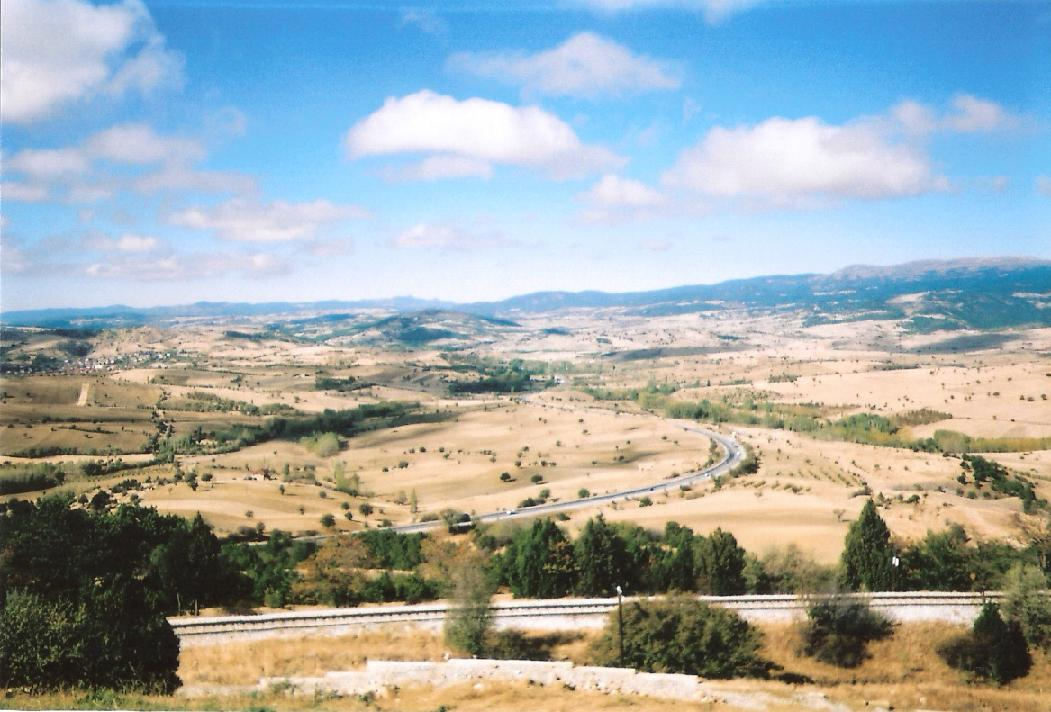
Battle of Dumlupınar(2)

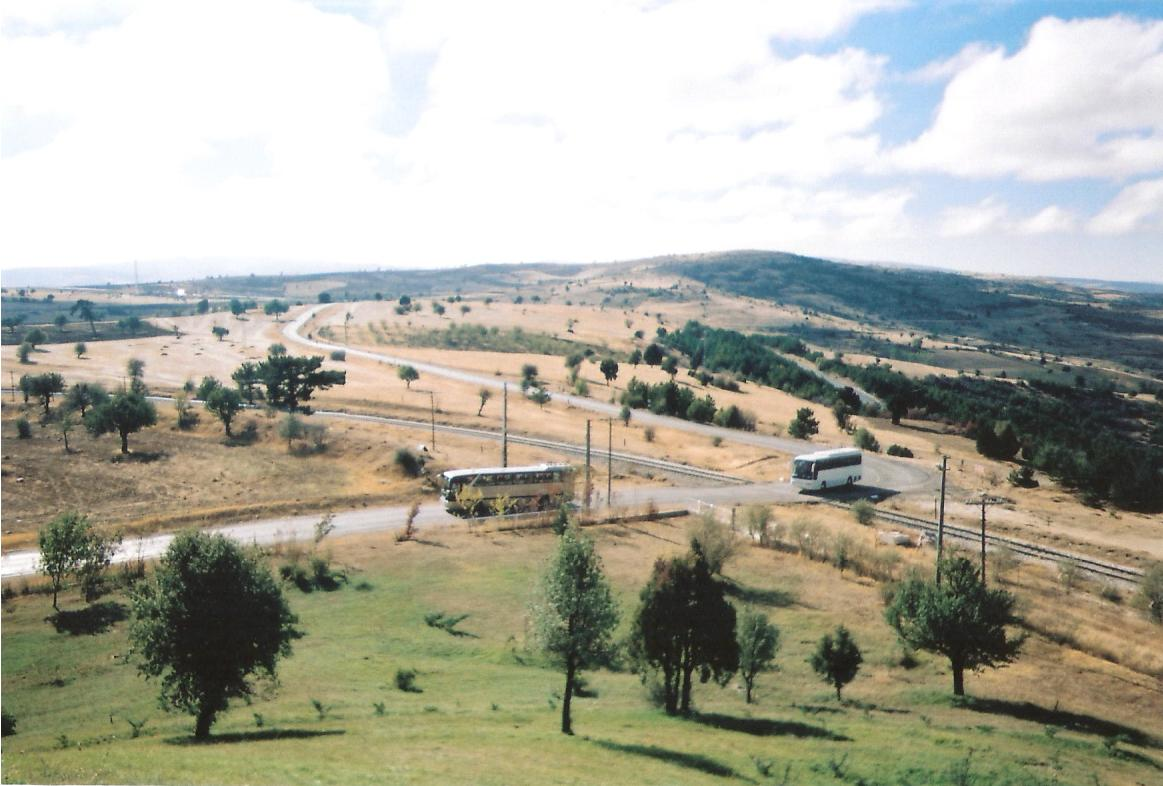
Battle of Dumlupınar(3)

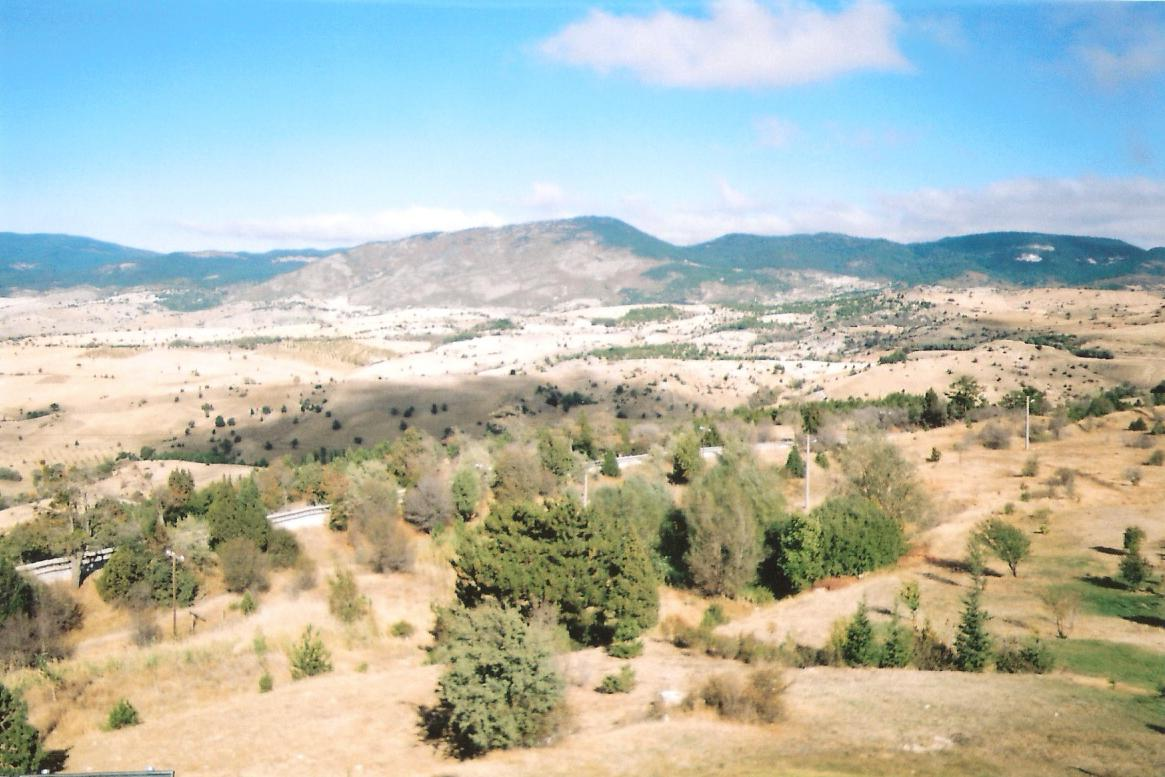
Battle of Dumlupınar(4)

== See also ==
- Kütahya Dumlupınar University
