= Kemalettin Sami Gökçen =

Turkish politician

Kemalettin Sami Gökçen 1321-İs. 1
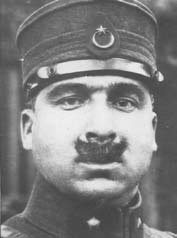
- Born: 1884; Sinop, Kastamonu Vilayet, Ottoman Empire
- Died: 15 April 1934 (aged 49–50); Berlin, Nazi Germany
- Burial place: State Cemetery
- Military career
- Allegiance: Ottoman Empire (1906–1919); Turkey (1920–1928)
- Service years: Ottoman Empire: 1906–1919, Turkey: 22 November 1920 – 24 September 1928
- Rank: Lieutenant general
- Commands: Chief of Staff of the Dardanelles Fortified Area Command, Staff of the Gallipoli Northern Group, Chief of Staff of the Inspectorate of Fortification and Fortified Area, Chief of Staff of the Hejaz Expeditionary Force, Chief of Staff of the VIII Corps, Military attaché to Ukraine, Chief of Staff of the Northern Caucasus Army, Inspector of the Rear Area of the Ninth Army, 10th Caucasian Division (deputy), Istanbul Guard, Deputy Commander of the XXV Corps, 10th Caucasian Division; 1st Division, Ankara Command, 4th Group, IV Corps
- Conflicts: Balkan Wars; World War I Turkish War of Independence
- Other work: Ambassador to Berlin

Kemalettin Sami Gökçen (1884 – 15 April 1934) was a Turkish career officer and politician. He was instrumental in establishing diplomatic relations between the Turkish Republic and Nazi Germany.

== Gallery ==
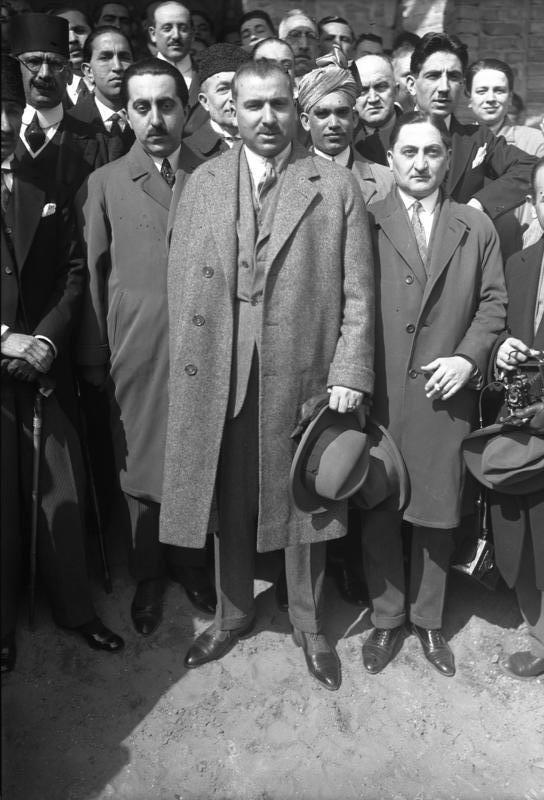
Kemalettin Sami Gökçen in Germany, 1926.

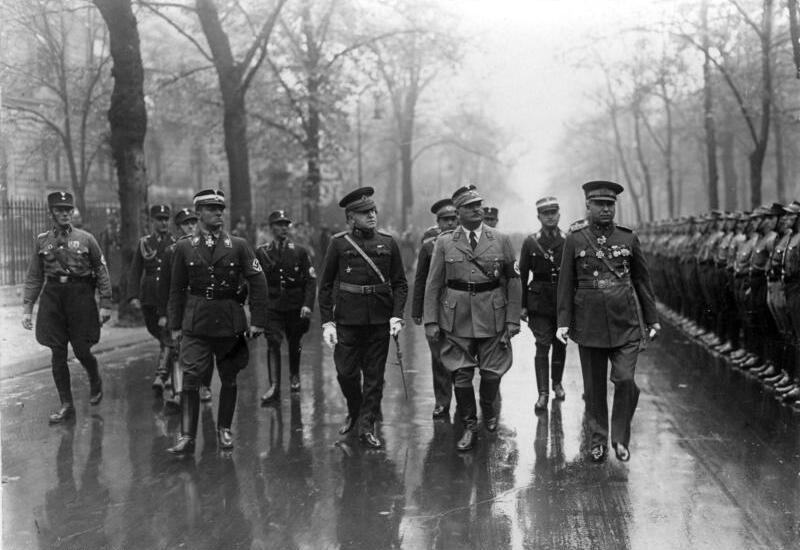
Kemalettin Sami Gökçen (far right) as ambassador to Berlin, during the 10-year anniversary of the Turkish Republic.

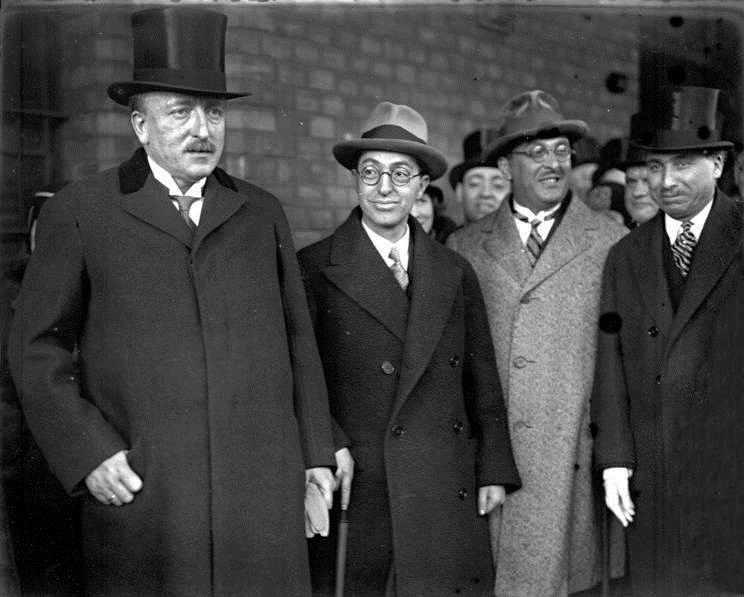
Kemalettin Sami Gökçen (far right) with Tevfik Rüştü Aras (second from left), and Carl von Schubert (far left)

== See also ==
- List of high-ranking commanders of the Turkish War of Independence
