= June 1918 =

Month in 1918

<<	June 1918					>>
Su	Mo	Tu	We	Th	Fr	Sa
						1
2	3	4	5	6	7	8
9	10	11	12	13	14	15
16	17	18	19	20	21	22
23	24	25	26	27	28	29
30

The following events occurred in June 1918:

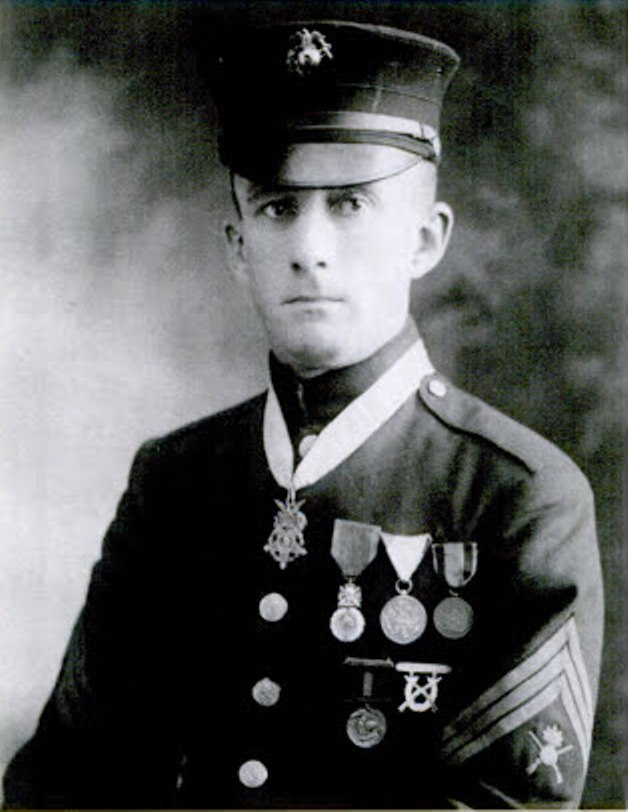
Gunnery Sergeant Ernest A. Janson, first U.S. Marine to receive the Medal of Honor in World War I.

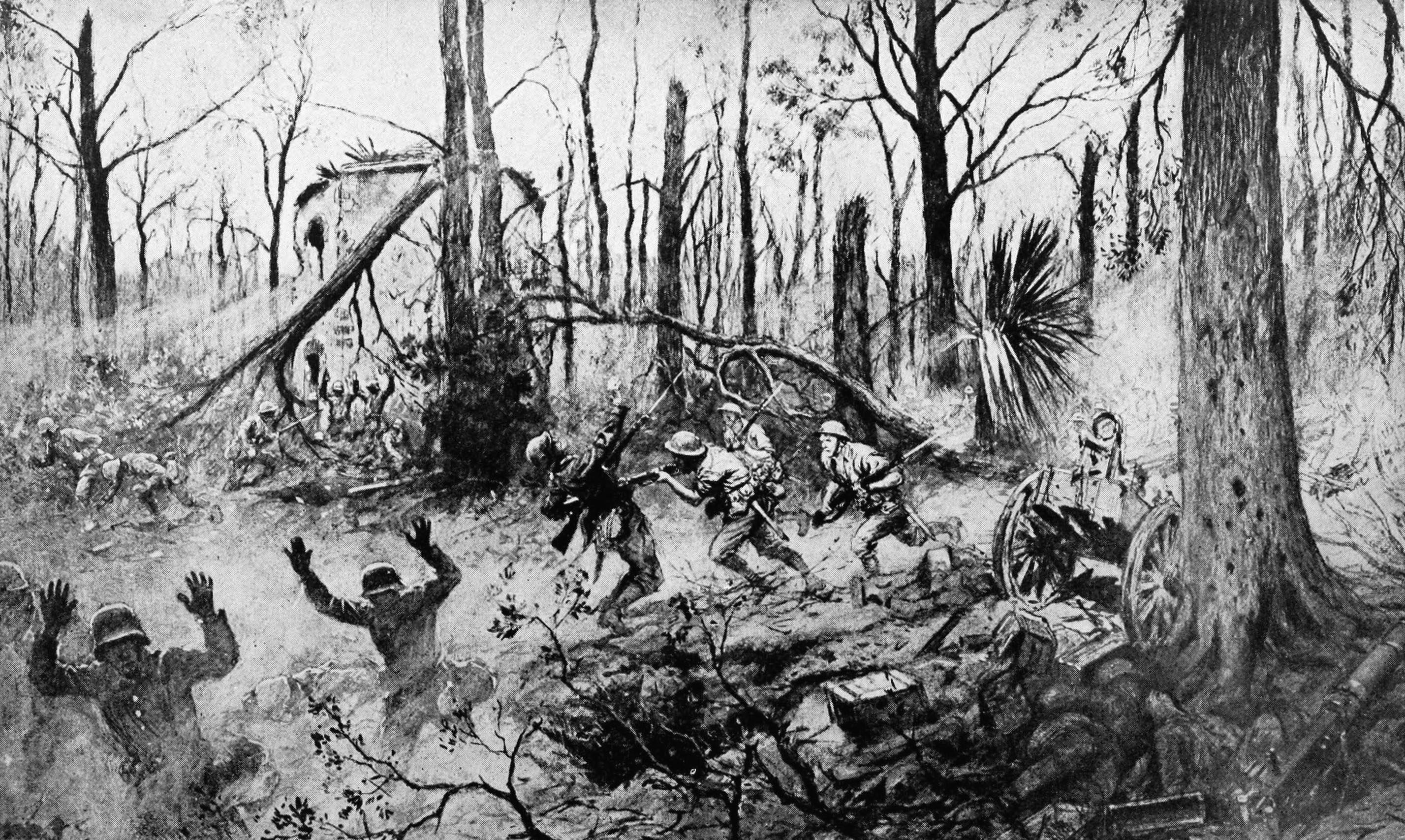
U.S. Marines attack German troops during Battle of Belleau Wood in France (painting by Georges Scott).

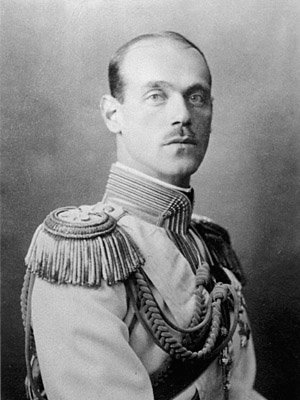
Grand Duke Michael Alexandrovich of Russia, assassinated

== June 1, 1918 (Saturday) ==
- The Spanish flu epidemic became a pandemic, killing over 30 million people over the next six months.
- Battle of Belleau Wood – The U.S. Army 2nd Infantry Division deployed troops, including the 5th and 6th Marine Regiments, to hold Belleau Wood near the Marne River in France after the towns of Château-Thierry and Vaux fell to the Germans.
- Australian flying ace Roderic Dallas was killed while flying a solo mission over Liévin, France. Dallas was the highest-ranking Australian ace of the World War I, with his victories ranging from an official count of 39 to other sources claiming up to 51 victories.
- The first of two giant German Zeppelin-Staaken bombers lost to enemy action in World War I was shot down by anti-aircraft guns over the French lines.
- The Royal Air Force established air squadrons No. 159 No. 162, and No. 163.
- The Royal Air Force Temporary Nursing Service was established, receiving the prefix Princess Mary in 1923 when the British princess (daughter of King George) became the service's patron.
- Tails Up!, a musical revue starring Jack Buchanan, opened at the Comedy Theatre in London where it ran for 467 performances.
- The bimonthly newspaper El Caribe published its first edition in Roatán, Honduras.
- U.S. President Woodrow Wilson signed a bill to direct the United States Mint to create the Illinois Centennial half dollar, a commemorative fifty-cent piece depicting Abraham Lincoln.

== June 2, 1918 (Sunday) ==
- Battle of Belleau Wood – The first battalion of the 5th U.S. Marines forced a march over 10 kilometres (6.2 mi) to plug a gap covering 20 kilometres (12 mi) in the Allied line that the Germans opened up the day before.
- German submarine SM U-151 shelled, torpedoed or scuttled six American ships off the coast of New Jersey in what was referred to as "Black Sunday", including passenger ship Carolina which resulted in 13 deaths.
- The American Expeditionary Forces set up military hospitals in Bazoilles-sur-Meuse, France, when Hospital No. 116 designed to treat over 2,000 wounded American soldiers.
- Marion Davies produced and starred in her second feature film Cecilia of the Pink Roses, released through Select Pictures.
- Born: Kathryn Tucker Windham, American columnist, known for narrative columns for the Selma Times-Journal; as Kathryn Tucker, in Selma, Alabama, United States (d. 2011)

== June 3, 1918 (Monday) ==
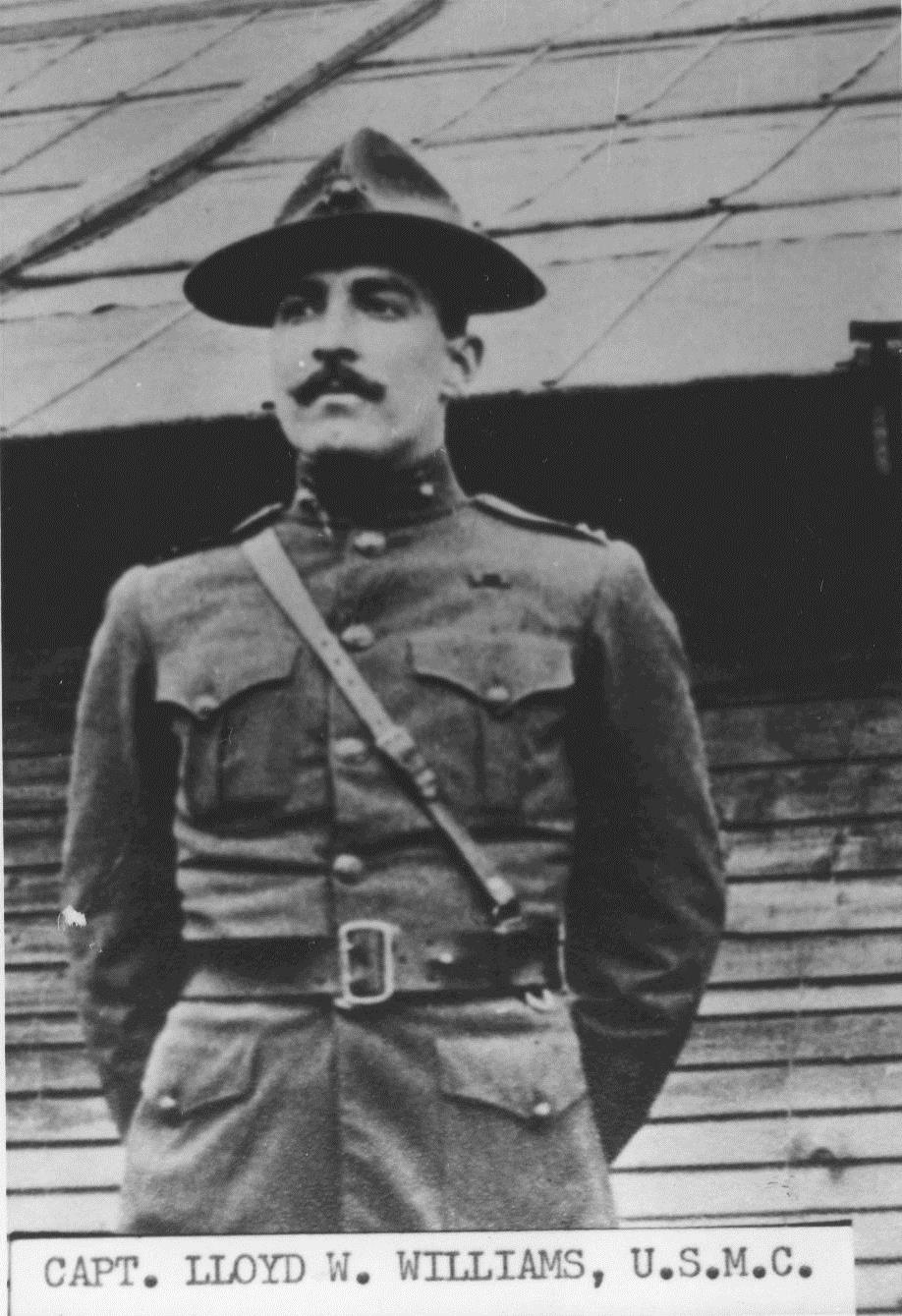
U.S. Marine Lloyd W. Williams

- Third Battle of the Aisne – Allied counterattacks halted the German advance at the Marne River. Allied casualties were massive at 127,000, including 98,000 French casualties and 29,000 British casualties. Germany suffered slightly more with 130,000 casualties.
- Battle of Belleau Wood – The first battalion of the 5th U.S. Marines held ground and inflicted heavy casualties on the attacking Germans, forcing them back to the village of Vaux. Captain Lloyd W. Williams was said to have famously responded to a general order to fall back with: "Retreat? Hell, we just got here!" He was killed in the battle on June 12 while waiting for the surviving Marines under his command to be evacuated by medics. For his bravery and sacrifice, Williams was posthumously awarded three Silver Stars and promoted to major.
- The British General Post Office increased postage rates to a penny halfpenny for ordinary letters, bringing an end to the Uniform Penny Post which had existed since 1840. The rate for postcards doubled from a halfpenny to a penny.
- The Distinguished Flying Cross (DFC) was established as the official medal of the Royal Air Force. By the end of World War I, some 1,100 DFCs were awarded.
- Bjørnøen was established as a mining company operating on Bear Island, Norway. It became nationalized in 1932 under the Ministry of Trade and Industry of Norway.
- The sports club Holter was established in Nannestad, Norway with sections for football and handball.
- Born: Patrick Cargill, British actor, best known for the lead title role in British television sitcom Father, Dear Father; in Bexhill-on-Sea, England (d. 1996)
- Died: Ramón Maximiliano Valdés, 50, Panamanian state leader, 7th President of Panama (b. 1867)

== June 4, 1918 (Tuesday) ==
- The Ottoman Empire signed a treaty with Armenia, Azerbaijan, and Georgia, ending most of the fighting in the Caucasus region.
- Battle of Belleau Wood – U.S. Army Major General Omar Bundy took command of the 2nd Infantry Division as the U.S. Marines continued to repel German attacks over the next 48 hours.
- The French Army established the 503rd Combat Tank Regiment.
- The inaugural flight of the Dornier-Zeppelin, the first all-metal stressed-skin fighter to be tested, took place.
- Born: Johnny Klein, American drummer, lead percussionist on The Lawrence Welk Show and second cousin to Lawrence Welk; as John A. Klein Jr., in Strasburg, North Dakota, United States (d. 1997)
- Died:
  - Charles W. Fairbanks, 66, American state leader, 26th Vice President of the United States (b. 1852)
  - Hāmiora Mangakāhia, 87–88, Māori leader, first Premier of Te Kotahitanga in New Zealand (b. 1838)
  - David Lawrence Anderson, 55–56, American law enforcement officer and former outlaw known as "Billy Wilson", shot and killed in the line of duty (b. 1862)

== June 5, 1918 (Wednesday) ==
- British armed boarding steamer HMS Snaefell was torpedoed and sunk in the Mediterranean Sea by German submarine SM UB-105, with all crew surviving.
- Douglas Campbell, the first American to become an ace while flying for an American-trained unit, scored his sixth and final victory. He was badly wounded during the flight and grounded from future combat missions.
- The Afrikaner Broederbond, a confidential cultural Afrikaner organisation, was founded in Johannesburg.

== June 6, 1918 (Thursday) ==
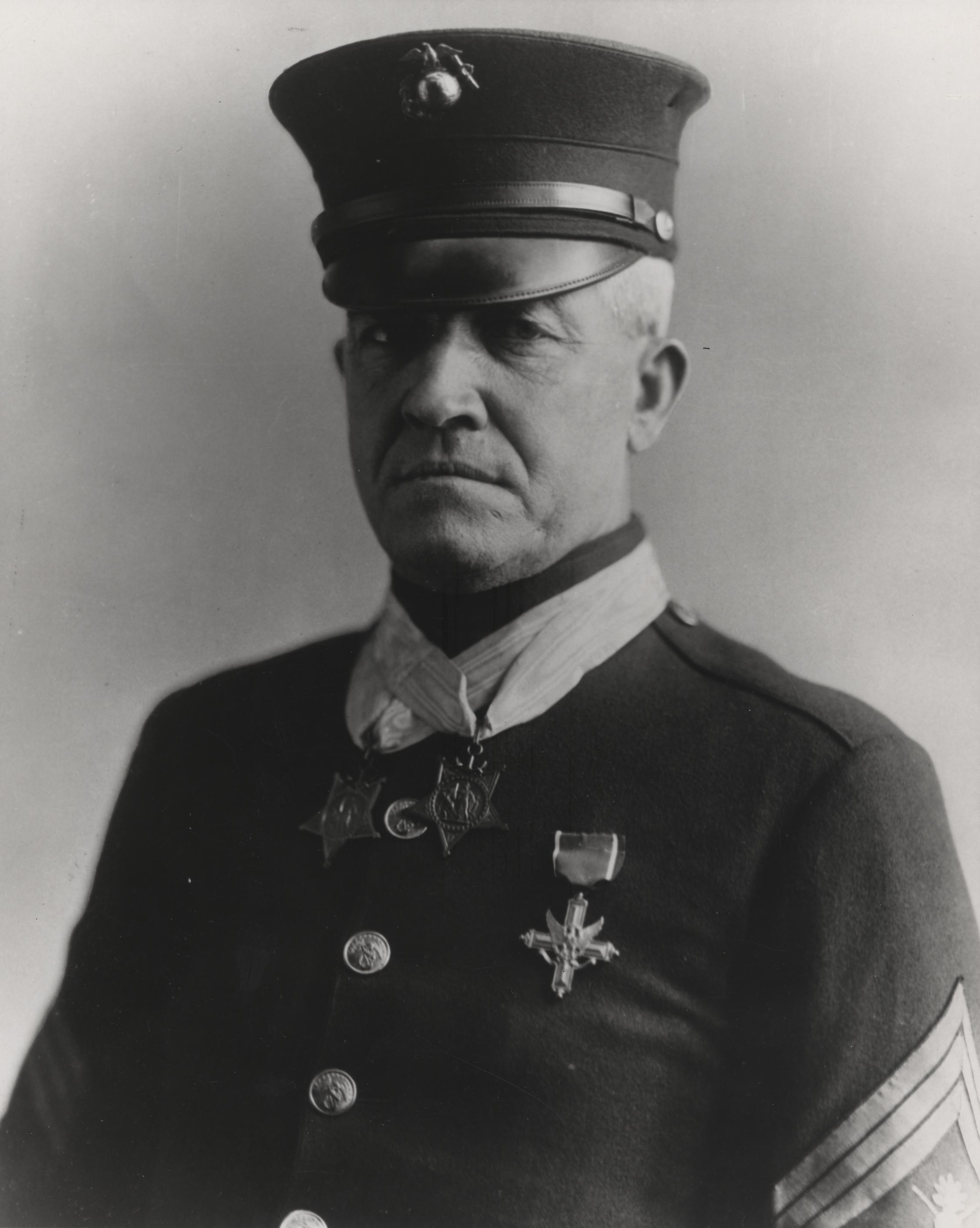
U.S. Marine Daniel Daly

- Third Battle of the Aisne – German forces were within 56 kilometres (35 mi) of Paris, forcing many civilians to flee and the French government to draw up plans to evacuate to Bordeaux. Casualties were high on both sides with 127,000 for the Allies and 130,000 for Germany.
- Battle of Goychay – Grigory Korganov, one of the Soviet commissars for Baku, issued an order for the Red Army to attack Ganja, Azerbaijan. This forced the Azerbaijani government to call on the Ottoman Empire for aide against the Soviet threat.
- Battle of Belleau Wood – The first battalion of the 5th U.S. Marines with French support launched an attack and captured the German defensive position Hill 142, at a cost of nine officers and 325 men. During German counterattacks, Gunnery Sergeant Ernest A. Janson held off a dozen German soldiers and became the first Marine to receive a Medal of Honor in World War I. The day was also marked in U.S. Marines historical lore as the day Gunnery Sergeant Daniel Daly was said to have shouted at his men to advance with the words: "Come on, you sons of bitches, do you want to live forever?"
- Dutch hospital ship Koningin Regentes was torpedoed and sunk in the North Sea by German submarine SM UB-107, killing seven crew.
- The Independent Air Force was established as a strategic bombing force separate from the Royal Air Force during World War I.
- The football club Sandviken was established in Sandviken, Sweden.
- Born:
  - Kenneth Connor, English comedian, known for his roles in the Carry On film series; in Islington, London, England (d. 1993)
  - Edwin G. Krebs, American biochemist, recipient of the Nobel Prize in Physiology or Medicine for his research into the phosphorylation; in Lansing, Iowa, United States (d. 2009)

== June 7, 1918 (Friday) ==
- Battle of Belleau Wood – The third battalions of the 5th and 6th U.S. Marines launched an assault on Belleau Wood where they gained a foothold in the forest, despite losing 31 officers and 1,056 men.
- The British colonial government in Nigeria arrested 70 chiefs of the Egba people as part of a crackdown on a general rebellion against direct taxation, forced labor laws, and other protests against the British authority.
- Died: Victor Duleep Singh, 51, Indian noble, last Maharaja of Lahore, Punjab, British India and the Sikh Empire, grandson of Ranjit Singh (b. 1866)

== June 8, 1918 (Saturday) ==
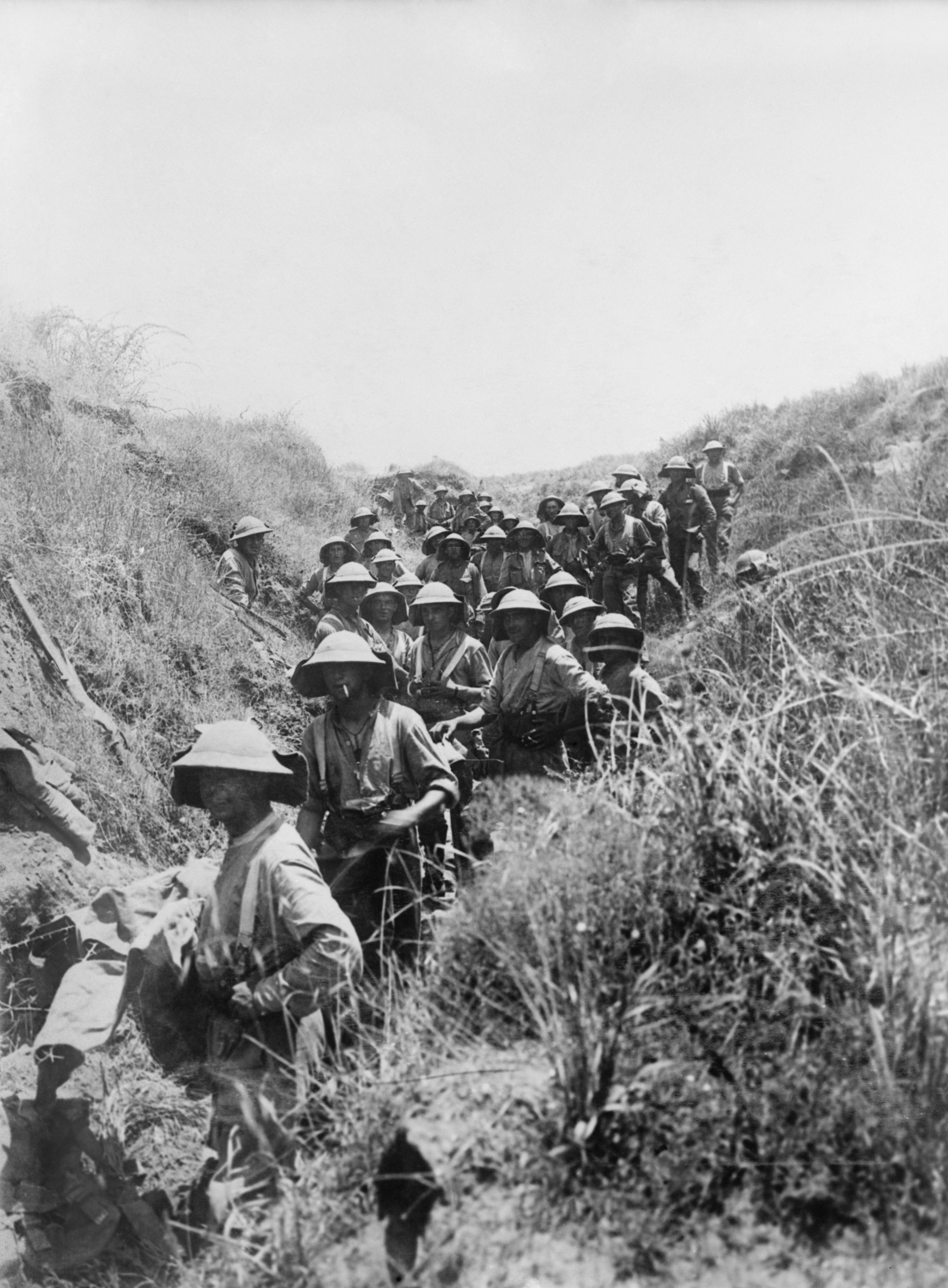
Troops with the Black Watch Scottish infantry defend trenches against Ottoman forces in Arsuf Palestine.

- German Caucasus expedition – A force of 3,000 German soldiers were dispatched to the port city of Poti, Georgia to support the Ottoman Third Army in the South Caucasus region.
- Battle of Belleau Wood – American and German forces were locked into a stalemate at Belleau Wood.
- Action of Arsuf – British captured two key Ottoman observation positions over the Auju River in central Palestine, killing 217 and capturing another 300 Ottoman troops. The British had 62 men killed and 110 wounded.
- The counterrevolutionary government Committee of Members of the Constituent Assembly was established in Samara, Russia, during the city's occupation by the Czechoslovak Legion.
- The nova V603 Aquilae, the brightest observed since Kepler's Supernova of 1604, was discovered by amateur astronomer Zygmunt Laskowski and later confirmed by amateur astronomer Grace Cook.
- The South African financial services group Sanlam was established in Cape Town.
- A solar eclipse was observed by the United States Naval Observatory in Baker City, Oregon, and crossed the United States from Washington to Florida.
- Born:
  - Robert Preston, American actor, known for leading roles in both the stage and film versions of The Music Man, as well as roles in How the West Was Won, S.O.B. and Victor/Victoria; as Robert Preston Meservey, in Newton, Massachusetts, United States (d. 1987)
  - George Edward Hughes, Irish-born New Zealand philosopher, known for works of logic and medieval philosophy, author of The Elements of Formal Logic; in Waterford, Ireland (d. 1994)
  - Leonard Greene, American aviation engineer, known to invent over 200 patents related to aviation technology; in New York City, United States (d. 2006)
- Died: Ben Brush, 24–25, American race horse, 1896 Kentucky Derby champion (b. 1893)

== June 9, 1918 (Sunday) ==
- German spring offensive – German forces launched the fourth stage of their offensive against the Allies on the Western Front with Operation Gneisenau, beginning with 21 German divisions attacking over a 23 mi (37 km) front along the Matz River in France, resulting in an advance of 9 miles (14 km).
- Battle of Belleau Wood – American and French artillery barraged Belleau Wood but failed to dislodge German defences.
- A general election was held in San Marino to elect the fifth Grand and General Council, with all politicians elected to its 60 seats being nonpartisan.
- Theda Bara starred in the silent drama Under the Yoke, which became noteworthy in its controversy in later years for its depiction of Filipinos and the one-sided view of American occupation in the Philippines.
- The Main Northern Line opened the North Strathfield railway station in Sydney.
- Born: John Hospers, American philosopher, developer of American libertarianism, presidential candidate for the Libertarian Party during the 1972 American presidential election; in Pella, Iowa, United States (d. 2011)
- Died: Anna Dostoevskaya, 71, Russian writer, second wife to Fyodor Dostoevsky, author of Anna Dostoyevskaya's Diary in 1867 and Memoirs of Anna Dostoyevskay (b. 1846)

== June 10, 1918 (Monday) ==
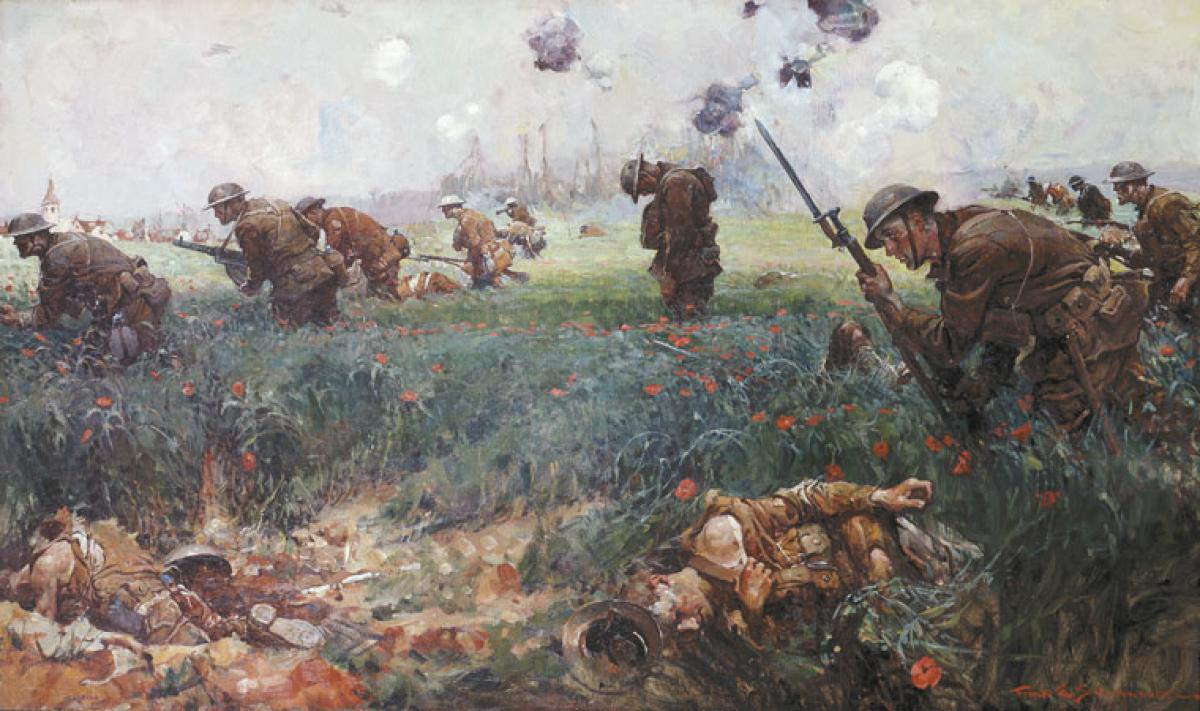
Members of the 6th U.S. Marines charging German defenses in Belleau Wood (painting by Frank Schoonover).

- Battle of Belleau Wood – The first battalion of the 6th U.S. Marines attacked German defenses at the north end of Belleau Wood, but were stopped by machine gun fire and mustard gas.
- German Caucasus expedition – Ottoman forces attacked Vorontsovka, Armenia, but it led to Germany threatening to pull its military support from the region. The Ottoman Empire conceded and stopped its advance into Armenia.
- Battle of Goychay – Red Army forces gathered at Kazi-Magomed, Azerbaijan, where they looted and burned Muslim villages in the surrounding area before marching on Ganja.
- Austro-Hungarian battleship SMS Szent István was sunk by two Italian torpedo boats off the coast of Dalmatia, killed 89 crew.
- Born: Barry Morse, English-Canadian actor, best known for the roles of Lt. Philip Gerard in the hit TV series The Fugitive and Professor Victor Bergman in the 1970s science fiction series Space: 1999; as Herbert Morse, in London, England (d. 2008)
- Died: Arrigo Boito, 76, Italian poet and composer, member of the Scapigliatura movement in Italy (b. 1842)

== June 11, 1918 (Tuesday) ==
- German spring offensive – A French force of four divisions and 150 tanks under command of Charles Mangin launched a surprise counterattack on the Germans at Compiègne, France, and halted the advance.
- Battle of Belleau Wood – The first battalion of the 5th U.S. Marines attacked German defenses on the west side Belleau Wood and managed to smash through despite heavy casualties.
- Battle of Goychay – Red Army forces occupied the towns of Kürdəmir, Maraza, and Shamakhi in Azerbaijan. However, their advance was halted at Bijo.
- British soldiers were dispatched from German East Africa to assist local authorities in quelling unrest in Nigeria.
- The Committees of Poor Peasants was established by the People's Commissariat for Food Supplies to address food shortages among the rural peasantry caused in part by the Russian Civil War.
- Born: Ruth Aarons, American table tennis player, gold medalist at the World Table Tennis Championships in 1936 and 1937; in Stamford, Connecticut, United States (d. 1980)

== June 12, 1918 (Wednesday) ==
- German spring offensive – Heavy casualties from French counterattacks forced the Germans to call off further advances along the Matz River in France. The Allies sustained 35,000 casualties and the Germans had 30,000 casualties.
- Haiti held a referendum on its new constitution, with 99% of voters approving it.
- Grand Duke Michael Alexandrovich of Russia was assassinated, the first of the Romanov family to be murdered by the Bolsheviks.
- Captain Roy Phillipps of the Australian Flying Corps No. 2 Squadron scored his 11th victory by shooting down five German fighters – three Fokker triplanes, an LVG, and a Fokker fighter plane – in a single patrol over Ribécourt-la-Tour, France. German flying ace Fritz Loerzer, commanding officer of the Jagdstaffel 26, was the pilot of the Fokker plane when it crashed, allowing him to be captured. Phillipps received the Distinguished Flying Cross for the patrol.
- The Royal Air Force established air squadron No. 151.
- Born:
  - Bruce Alger, American politician, U.S. Representative of Texas from 1955 to 1965; in Dallas, United States (d. 2015)
  - Arthur Iberall, American physicist, developer of homeokinetics; in New York City, United States (d. 2002)

== June 13, 1918 (Thursday) ==
- The Eastern Front formed in the Russian Civil War.
- A total of 30,000 rebels among the Egba people in Nigeria began coordinated strikes on British-held facilities.
- Royal Navy cruiser HMS Conquest struck a mine and was damaged in the North Sea with the loss of seven of her crew.
- Born:
  - Ben Johnson, American actor, best known for his roles in film Westerns for John Ford and Sam Peckinpah, recipient of the Academy Award for Best Supporting Actor for The Last Picture Show; as Francis Benjamin Johnson Jr., in Foraker, Oklahoma, United States (d. 1996)
  - Helmut Lent, German air force officer, commander of the Nachtjagdgeschwader (Night Flyer) squadrons for the Luftwaffe during World War II, recipient of the Knight's Cross of the Iron Cross; in Pyrehne, German Empire (present-day Pyrzany, Poland) (d. 1944, killed in action)
  - Frazier Thomas, American television personality, host of the television children's show Garfield Goose and Friends; as William Frazier Thomas, in Rushville, Indiana, United States (d. 1985)
- Died: Charles Johnston, 72, New Zealand politician, 14th Speaker of the New Zealand Legislative Council (b. 1845)

== June 14, 1918 (Friday) ==
- The Imperial Commercial College of Saint Petersburg was brought under control of the Commission on Public Education of the Northern Workers, and subsequently ceased functioning as an educational institution.
- Born: Francis Burt, Australian judge and politician, 11th Chief Justice of Western Australia and 29th Governor of Western Australia; in Cottesloe, Western Australia, Australia (d. 2004)
- Died: George Morton Randall, 76, American army officer, noted commander during the American Civil War and American Indian Wars (b. 1841)

== June 15, 1918 (Saturday) ==
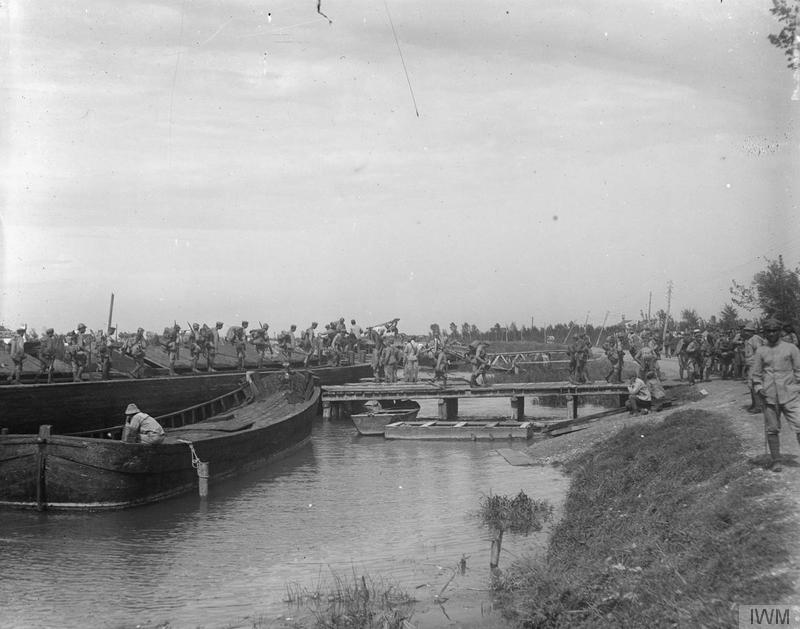
Italian marines of the San Marco Brigade land from barges to take up battle positions on the Piave River in northern Italy.

- Second Battle of the Piave River – The Austro-Hungarian Army under command of Svetozar Boroević launched 58 divisions against 52 divisions of the Italian Army under command of Armando Diaz, supported from by British and French units, along the Piave River in northern Italy. The attack was ill-timed with the river higher due to spring thaw, trapping many Austro-Hungarian troops on the wrong side and making them easy targets for Italian fire. It was estimated 20,000 soldiers drowned trying to cross the river.
- Lieutenant General Józef Haller, commander of the Polish Army, signed an agreement to fight with the Allies resulting in the reorganization of Polish military units into what was collectively known as the Murmańczycy.
- Australian steamship Makambo ran aground at the northern end of Lord Howe Island in the Tasman Sea. The vessel was refloated nine days later, but in that time black rats left the vessel and went ashore. The following years, the rat population exploded and wreaked havoc on the island's ecosystem, leading to the extinction of several of the island's birds and ravaging the sole crop on the island of kentia palm.
- Edward Brittain, brother to Vera Brittain, was killed by a sniper during the Second Battle of the Piave River on the Italian Front. His death added to the already heavy grief Vera experienced with the war deaths of Vera's fiancé Roland Leighton and close friends Victor Richardson and Geoffrey Thurlow earlier in World War I. All four men were featured prominently in her memoir Testament of Youth.
- Born: François Tombalbaye, Chadian state leader, first President of Chad; in Moyen-Chari, French Chad (present-day Chad) (d. 1975, assassinated)

== June 16, 1918 (Sunday) ==
- Second Battle of the Piave River – Austro-Hungarian forces under command of Franz Conrad von Hötzendorf failed to capture Vicenza, with a loss of 40,000 men.
- Battle of Goychay – Red Army forces defeated Azerbaijani and Georgian militias and forced them to retreat to the city of Goychay, while also threatening the towns of Aghsu, Garamaryam and Bygyr.
- British diplomat Henry McMahon published the Declaration to the Seven as the official British government response to a memorandum issued anonymously by seven Syrian notables in Cairo, which requested from the Allies a "guarantee of the ultimate independence of Arabia".

== June 17, 1918 (Monday) ==
- Battle of Goychay – The Red Army defeated Ottoman forces west of the town of Garamaryam with a loss of 200 casualties.
- German submarine SM U-64 was depth charged, shelled and sunk in the Mediterranean Sea by Royal Navy patrol ship HMS Lychnis with the loss of 38 of her 43 crew.
- The Ministry of Healthcare for the government of Azerbaijan was established.
- Ball State University was established in Muncie, Indiana, with an initial enrollment of 235 students.
- The Latvian Social Democratic Workers' Party was established in Riga.
- The Great Central Railway opened Sealand railway station to serve military personnel at the training camp in Sealand, Flintshire, Wales.
- Born:
  - Ajahn Chah, Thai religious leader, major founder of Theravada Buddhism; as Chah Chuangchot, in Ubon Ratchathani, Siam (present-day Thailand) (d. 1992)
  - Carmen Casco de Lara Castro, Paraguayan activist, founder of the Cultural Institute of Refuge for Women, the first independent human rights organizations in Latin America; in Asunción, Paraguay (d. 1993)
- Died: Frank Leaman Baylies, 22, American air force officer, member of French flight squadrons Escadrille 73 and Escadrille 3, recipient of the Legion of Honour, Médaille militaire and Croix de Guerre; killed in action (b. 1895)

== June 18, 1918 (Tuesday) ==
- The Imperial Russian Navy scuttled 10 warships, including battleship Svobodnaya Rossiya, at Novorossiysk, Russia, instead of handing them over to Germany under the stipulations of the Treaty of Brest-Litovsk.
- British cargo ship SS Dwinsk was torpedoed and damaged by German submarine U-151 in the Atlantic Ocean 400 mi (350 nmi; 640 km) from Bermuda. A total 22 crew were killed in the attack. U.S. Navy troopship USS Von Steuben chased the submarine and fired on it, but damage was minor and the German vessel escaped.
- The Second Red Army was established to defend the newly formed Eastern Front in the Russian Civil War.
- The first of the Guagua National Colleges was established in Guagua, Philippines.
- Born:
  - Jerome Karle, American chemist, recipient of the Nobel Prize in Chemistry for research into crystal structures; as Jerome Karfunkle, in New York City, United States (d. 2013)
  - Franco Modigliani, Italian-American economist, recipient of the Nobel Memorial Prize in Economic Sciences for development of Neo-Keynesian economics; in Rome, Kingdom of Italy (present-day Italy) (d. 2003)
  - Reinaldo Gorno, Argentine marathon runner, silver medalist at the 1952 Summer Olympics; in Yapeyú, Corrientes, Argentina (d. 1994)

== June 19, 1918 (Wednesday) ==
- Second Battle of the Piave River – General Armando Diaz, Chief of Staff of the Italian Army, ordered a counterattack against the flank of the attacking Austro-Hungarian force, which inflicted heavy casualties.
- Italian flying ace Francesco Baracca was killed during a flying mission in northern Italy. He had 34 confirmed victories at the time of his death.
- Columbia Pictures, an American film studio owned by Sony Pictures Entertainment, was founded by Harry Cohn, Jack Cohn and Joe Brandt.

== June 20, 1918 (Thursday) ==
- German submarine SM UC-64 struck a mine and sank in the Strait of Dover with the loss of all 30 crew.
- Eighteen United States Army Air Service cadets undergoing training by the Royal Italian Army's Military Aviation Corps arrived at the Italian Front for bombing operations against Austria-Hungary under the command of Captain Fiorello La Guardia. American cadet Clarence Young was shot down and killed during the mission, becoming the first of three American aircrew casualties suffered while flying with the Italians during World War I.
- Arthur Griffith of Sinn Féin won a by-election in East Cavan, Ireland making it the first victory of the year for the political party after three successive by-election defeats.
- Born: Sergei Scherbakov, Russian boxer, silver medalist at the 1952 Summer Olympics; in Moscow, Russian SFSR (d. 1994)

== June 21, 1918 (Friday) ==
- Pressure over the major loss of Skra, Macedonia forced Vasil Radoslavov to resign as Prime Minister of Bulgaria, allowing moderate leader Aleksandar Malinov to succeed him. Radoslavov fled the country shortly after the end of the war.
- U.S. Navy cruiser USS Schurz was accidentally rammed and sunk in the Atlantic Ocean by a U.S. Coast Guard ship with the loss of a crew member.
- Born: Josephine Webb, American engineer, inventor of the switchgear, founding member of the Society of Women Engineers; as Josephine Rohas, in Niagara Falls, New York, United States (d. 2017)

== June 22, 1918 (Saturday) ==
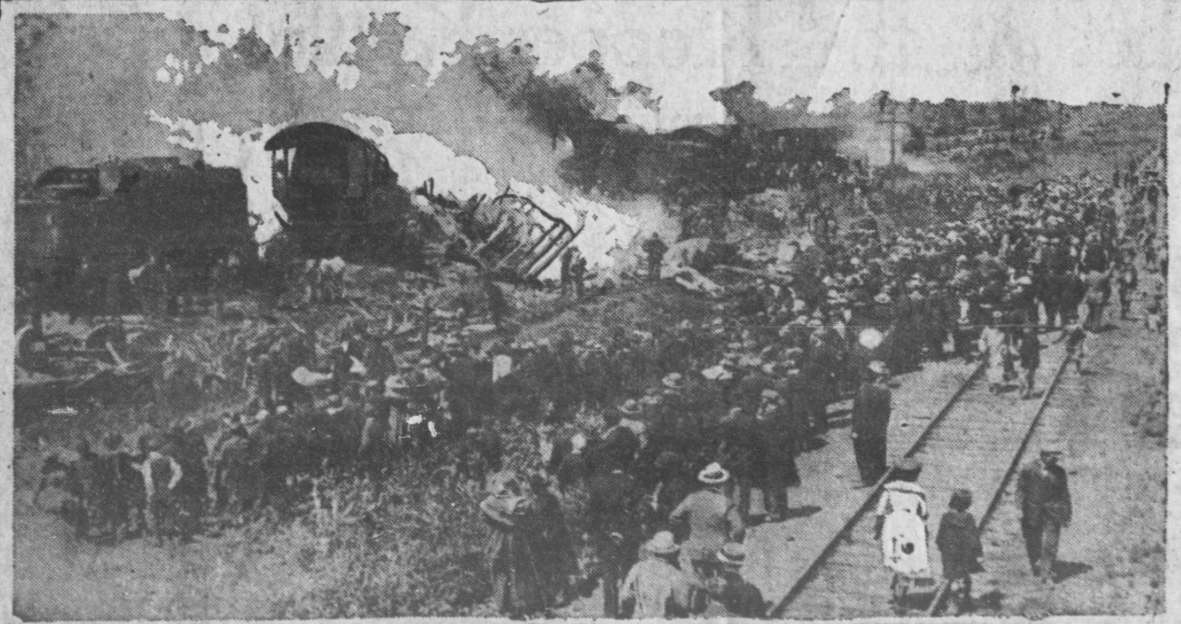
Onlookers surround a wrecked circus train in Hammond, Indiana.

- A collision between a circus train and passengers cars on the Michigan Central Railroad in Hammond, Indiana, caused a fire that killed 86 people and injured 127 others.
- Four suspects along with more than 100 waiters were arrested in Chicago after widespread incidents of restaurateurs being poisoned with antimony potassium tartrate, a drug better known for its street name Mickey Finn.
- Norwegian tennis player Molla Bjurstedt defeated American contender Eleanor Goss 6–4, 6–3 in a challenge round to win the title for the U.S. National Championships women's singles at the Philadelphia Cricket Club in Chestnut Hill, Philadelphia. It was the last time a challenge round was used in the women's championship final.
- Born:
  - Cicely Saunders, English nurse and physician, pioneer of hospice care; in Chipping Barnet, London, England (d. 2005)
  - Yeoh Ghim Seng, Singaporean politician, 5th Speaker of the Parliament of Singapore; in Ipoh, Perak, British Malaya (present-day Malaysia) (d. 1993)
- Died: John J. Keane, 78, Irish-American clergy, Bishop of Richmond from 1878 to 1900, Archbishop of Dubuque from 1900 to 1911, first rector for the Catholic University of America (b. 1839)

== June 23, 1918 (Sunday) ==
- Second Battle of the Piave River – Italian forces regained all ground lost in the Austro-Hungarian offensive and pushed the Austro-Hungarian Army back to its starting position. Allied forces suffered 87,181 casualties, but Austria-Hungary suffered more with 118,000 casualties.
- Born: James Young, Irish comedian, known for his sketch comedy work for Group Theatre in Belfast, and the longest-running one-man show according to Guinness World Records; in Ballymoney, Ireland (d. 1974)

== June 24, 1918 (Monday) ==
- Royal Navy submarine HMS D6 was sunk in the Atlantic Ocean by German submarine SM UB-73 with the loss of 24 of her 26 crew.
- The first scheduled Canadian airmail flight was made between Montreal and Toronto.
- Dickinson State University was established in Dickinson, North Dakota, first as a normal school to fill a need for qualified teachers in rural western North Dakota.
- The Royal Air Force employed its new 1,650-lb (748-kg) bomb in combat for the first time when a Handley Page bomber with the No. 216 Squadron dropped one on Middelkerke, Belgium.
- Born: Elizabeth Eames, British archaeologist, leading expert on the medieval Anglo-Saxons; as Elizabeth Sara Graham, in Northampton, England (d. 2008)

== June 25, 1918 (Tuesday) ==
- The Crimean Regional Government was established with support from Germany. The Red Army invaded and took control of the region the following year.
- The Original Dixieland Jazz Band released their third hit "Sensation Rag", written by band trombonist Eddie Edwards.
- Born: P. H. Newby, British writer, author of Something to Answer For; as Percy Howard Newby, in Crowborough, England (d. 1997)
- Died:
  - Jake Beckley, 50, American baseball player, first baseman for various Major League teams including the Cincinnati Reds and St. Louis Cardinals (b. 1867)
  - Walter Boyd, 85, Irish judge, member of the Privy Council of Ireland from 1885 to 1916 (b. 1833)
  - James Lide Coker, 81, American entrepreneur and philanthropist, founder of Sonoco and Coker College (b. 1837)
  - James Douglas, 80, Canadian-American industrialist, leading developer of the mining industry in Arizona including the Copper Queen Mine, grandfather to Lewis Williams Douglas (b. 1837)

== June 26, 1918 (Wednesday) ==
- Battle of Belleau Wood – The third battalion of the 5th U.S. Marines finally pushed the Germans out of Belleau Wood after 10 days of bloody hand-to-hand fighting. In total, the Americans suffered 1,811 men killed and 7,996 men wounded. German casualties were heavy but exact figures were unknown, although 1,600 German soldiers were taken prisoner.
- Australian passenger ship Wimmera struck a mine and sank in the Pacific Ocean off the coast of New Zealand, with the loss of 26 passengers and crew.
- German submarine SM UC-11 struck a mine and sank in the Strait of Dover with the loss of all but one of her 19 crew.
- Azerbaijan established its own armed forces, with Samad bey Mehmandarov as first Minister of Defense.
- The Cherepovets Governorate was established by the Soviet Russia for the city of Cherepovets, and remained active until 1927.
- American flying ace Field Eugene Kindley scored the first of his 12 victories, shooting down the Pfalz fighter of Jagdstaffel 5 commanding officer Wilhelm Lehmann over Albert, France while flying on missions with Royal Air Force's No. 65 Squadron.
- Born:
  - Ellen Liiger, Estonian actress, known for film roles including the film adaptation of Karge meri; in Tallinn, Estonia (d. 1987)
  - Roger Voisin, French-American classical musician, trumpeter for the Boston Symphony Orchestra, and noted for recordings with composers Paul Hindemith, Leroy Anderson and Alexander Arutiunian; in Angers, France (d. 2008)
  - Rama Raghoba Rane, Indian army officer, noted commander during the Indo-Pakistani War, recipient of the Param Vir Chakra; in Karnataka, British India (present-day India) (d. 1994)
- Died:
  - Kyrion, 62, Georgian religious leader, first Catholicos-Patriarch of All Georgia; assassinated (b. 1855)
  - Peter Rosegger, 74, Austrian poet, known for poetry collection such as Zither und Hackbrett, three-time nominee for the Nobel Prize in Literature (b. 1843)

== June 27, 1918 (Thursday) ==
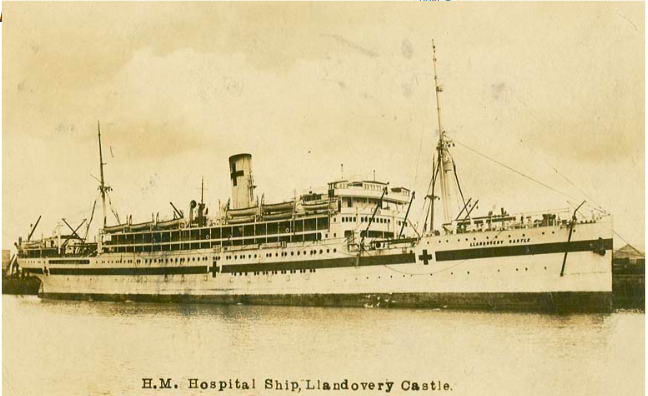
HMHS Llandovery Castle

- Battle of Goychay – The Islamic Army of the Caucasus under command of Nuri Killigil defended the city of Goychay, Azerbaijan from the 11th Red Army.
- Canadian hospital ship HMHS Llandovery Castle was torpedoed and sunk in the Atlantic Ocean by German submarine SM U-86 with the loss of 234 of the 258 people on board, making it the deadliest naval disaster in Canadian history.
- Axeman of New Orleans – Louis Besumer and his mistress Harriet Lowe were attacked in his New Orleans home with an axe that Besumer owned. Besumer survived the attack but the resulting investigation led to him becoming a suspect in the case. He served a nine-month sentence before a new trial acquitted him. The attack was similar to a previous murder involving an axe as a weapon and became connected to a series of subsequent murders in New Orleans.
- The Royal Navy established the Gunnery and Torpedo Division.
- Born:
  - Adolph Kiefer, American swimmer and businessman, gold medalist at the 1936 Summer Olympics, founder of aquatics equipment company Adolph Kiefer & Associates, Inc.; in Chicago, United States (d. 2017)
  - Edgar Kain, New Zealand air force officer, recipient of the Distinguished Flying Cross for action during the Battle of France; in Hastings, New Zealand (d. 1940, killed in action)
- Died: Joséphin Péladan, 60, French occultist, promoter of Catholic occultism, founder of the Salon de la Rose + Croix (b. 1858)

== June 28, 1918 (Friday) ==
- Born: William Whitelaw, British politician, cabinet minister for the Edward Heath and Margaret Thatcher administrations; in Nairn, Scotland (d. 1999)
- Died:
  - Albert Henry Munsell, 60, American inventor, creator of the Munsell color system (b. 1858)
  - Lizzie Halliday, 58–59, Irish-American serial killer, first woman to be sentenced to be executed by electric chair for murder (sentence was commuted) (b. 1859)

== June 29, 1918 (Saturday) ==
- The United States Army Air Service established the 2nd Pursuit Group at the Toul-Croix de Metz Airfield in France using pilots from the 13th Aero Squadron.
- The Massachusetts Bay Transportation Authority opened the Andrew station for the Red Line in Boston.
- Bronx International Exposition of Science, Arts and Industries opened in New York City.
- Born: Francis W. Nye, American air force officer, commander of the 28th Bomb Wing, Fairchild Air Force Base, and Sandia Base during the 1960s, two-time recipient of the Legion of Merit and Distinguished Flying Cross; in Barton, Vermont, United States (d. 2019)
- Died:
  - John Ames Mitchell, 73, American publisher, co-founder of Life magazine (b. 1845)
  - Tomás Claudio, 26, Filipino soldier, first Filipino soldier to serve and die in an international conflict; killed in action near Château-Thierry, France (b. 1892)

== June 30, 1918 (Sunday) ==
- Battle of Goychay – The Islamic Army of the Caucasus defeated the 11th Red Army at Goychay, Azerbaijan, allowing them to occupy lands between Goychay and Shamakhi.
- The first meeting between the Zionist leader Chaim Weizmann and Arab Revolt leader Prince Faisal took place at Faisal's headquarters in Aqaba in an attempt to establish favorable relations between Arabs and Jews in the Middle East.
