= Battle of Goychay =

Battle in 1918 in the Caucasus that the Ottoman–Azerbaijani forces won

- Part of the Armenian–Azerbaijani war during the Caucasus campaign of World War I and Southern Front of the Russian Civil War
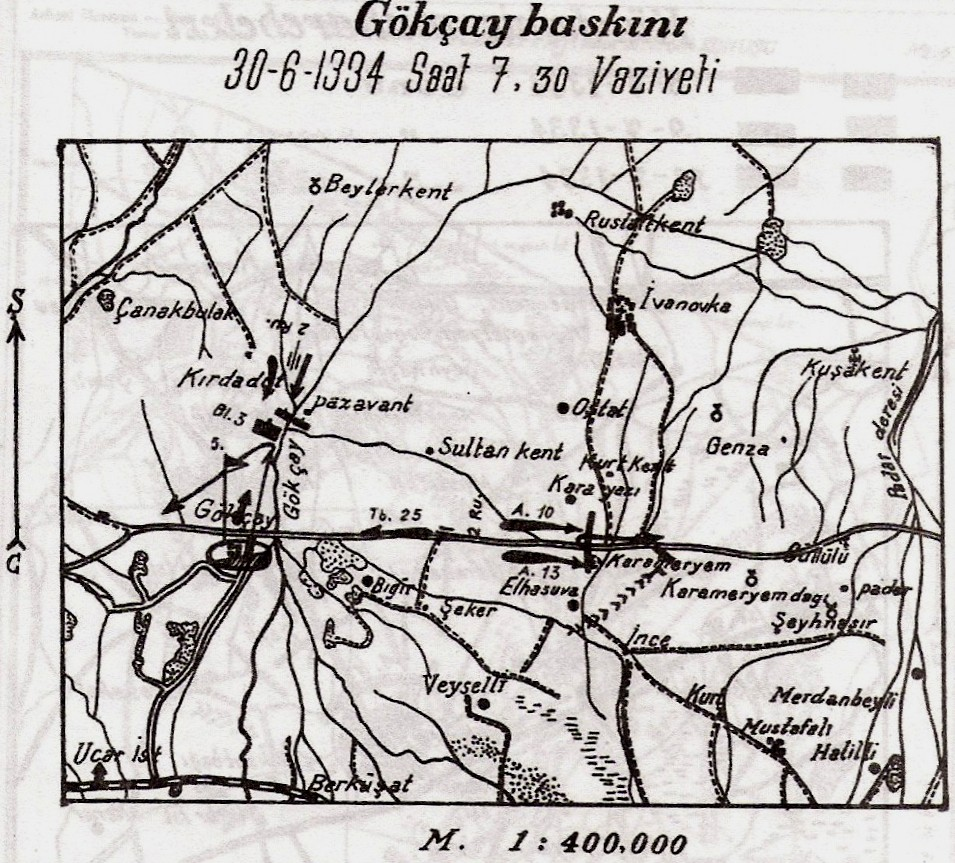
- Battle plan written in Turkish.
Date	27 June – 1 July 1918 (4 days)
Location	Goychay, Baku Governorate, Azerbaijan Democratic Republic 40°39′11″N 47°44′26″E
Result	Ottoman–Azerbaijani victory
Territorial changes	Ottoman–Azerbaijani coalition forces capture lands from Goychay to Shamakhi

Belligerents
Central Powers: Ottoman Empire (Azerbaijan Democratic Republic) Azerbaijan (Democratic Republic of Georgia) Georgian volunteers	Bolsheviks: Baku Commune (Russian Soviet Federative Socialist Republic) Russian SFSR Entente Powers: Armenian Revolutionary Federation White movement: Cossacks

Commanders and leaders
(Ottoman Empire) Ali İhsan Sâbis (Ottoman Empire) Cemil Cahit Toydemir (Ottoman Empire) Rüştü Pasha (Ottoman Empire) Topal Osman (Azerbaijan Democratic Republic) Ali-Agha Shikhlinski (Azerbaijan Democratic Republic) Habib Bey Salimov (Azerbaijan Democratic Republic) Ahmad Hamdi Bey	Stepan Shaumian; Grigory Korganov; Grigory Petrov (Russian Soviet Federative Socialist Republic) Sergey Kirov; Hamazasp Srvandztyan; Lazar Bicherakhov

Strength
(Ottoman Empire) 5,000 (Azerbaijan Democratic Republic) Less than 5,000 (Note: The Azerbaijan Democratic Republic declared its independence on 28 May 1918, but did not have any military strength. Until then, Azerbaijanis only served in the Caucasian Native Cavalry Division (Savage Division). (Note: Caucasian Native Cavalry Division consisted of less than ten thousand soldiers.) On 26 June, the Azerbaijani Special Corps was established, consisting of five thousand men that had served in the so-called "Savage Division".)	Unknown; 5,000

Casualties and losses
Unknown	Unknown

The Battle of Goychay (Azerbaijani: Göyçay döyüşü; Russian: Геокчайский бой; Turkish: Göyçay/Gökçay Savaşı) or Raid on Goychay (Azerbaijani: Göyçay basqını, Turkish: Göyçay/Gökçay Baskını), was a series of clashes that took place from 27 June to 1 July 1918, between Ottoman–Azerbaijani coalition forces led by Nuri Pasha and a coalition of the Soviet 11th Army and Armenian Dashnak forces. The initial battle ended on 30 June, but minor clashes continued until 1 July. Despite being outnumbered six to one, the Central Powers were able to defeat the Armenian–Soviet forces before they reached Ganja, the headquarters of the Ottoman Islamic Army of the Caucasus. The Ottoman–Azerbaijani forces seized control of the lands from Goychay to Shamakhi. Armenian–Soviet rule in the region ended as a result of the battle.

== Background ==
The Shaumian-led Baku Commune decided to launch a military operation to prevent the Ottoman Army from recovering in Ganja. The commander of the Military and Maritime Affairs Committee of the Baku People's Commissariat Grigory Korganov signed an order on 4 June 1918 asking the Red Army to take action. He gave instructions to the Armenian–Bolshevik–Russian forces to capture the plain up to Yevlakh and seize the Yevlakh bridge. On 6 June, Armenian and Russian–Bolshevik troops set off from Baku to Kazi-Magomed (modern-day Hajigabul). They pillaged Kazi-Magomed and using fire razed the surrounding villages.

The Red Army forces, which began to gather at Kazi-Magomed Station, set off on 10 June for Ganja, then the capital of the Azerbaijan Democratic Republic. There was a small military unit led by Georgian-born Levan Makalov, consisting of Georgians and Azerbaijanis against the Red Army. The coalition forces seized the Syghyr Station on 10 June. At this time, Shaumian learned the Ottoman military forces had not yet reached Ganja, where Armenian residents were clashing with the Ottoman–Azerbaijani troops. He wanted to take advantage of this situation, which was favourable to the Baku commissioner. The seizure of the Syghyr Station greatly encouraged Shaumian. In a telegram he sent to Vladimir Lenin, he wrote:

The frontal forces of the military occupied the Syghyr Station on 11 June. Our intelligence branch is currently under heavy fire in Karrar Station. Our military forces are moving forward.

— Stepan Shaumian,

=== Kyurdamir ===
The first branch of the Red Army forces moved westward along the Baku–Hajiqabul railway, leading to the Myusyuslyu Station, while the other branch passed through Hajigabul and reached Kyurdamir. The Red Army forces in the region gathered and attacked Kyurdamir. Resistance by the militia forces, which consisted of Azerbaijanis who tried to defend the city, was unsuccessful. The Red Army took control of the station, along with the city itself. The occupation of Kyurdamir by the Bolshevik-Dashnak forces made the coalition forces in Ganja nervous. This was a serious hindrance to the advance of the Islamic Army of the Caucasus to Baku.

=== Shamakhi, Aghsu and Ismailly ===
The third branch of the Red Army also moved from the north of Baku. Moving along the Baku–Ganja highway to the north-west, they entered Maraza and Shamakhi. The Bolshevik-led Armenian forces attacked the village of Bijo, resulting in a battle between the village population and 400 Armenian troops. The battle ended in a decisive Azerbaijani victory. Having suffered an unexpected heavy defeat, the Bolsheviks sent a larger invasion force to the village. Hearing of this, the village residents were forced to move to Aghsu and then to Goychay. After burning down Bijo, the Armenian–Bolshevik force advanced to the town of Aghsu, then to the villages of Garamaryam and Bygyr. The 1st and 3rd divisions of the 11th Army captured Ismailly and its surrounding settlements to the north of Garamaryam. On the morning of 16 June, the 11th Army's 3rd division forces attacked the Azerbaijani, Dagestani and Georgian militants in the region. At the end of the battle, which lasted over seven hours, the coalition forces were forced to retreat to Goychay. The 11th Army started to gain more support from the Armenian and Russian-populated villages in the region.

== Comparison of forces ==
Soviet historians claim the Ottoman Army had a numerical advantage over the Bolsheviks, but Mustafa Görüryılmaz notes that in reality, the opposite was true. He writes that "during the beginning of the battle, the Turkish military force that had reached Azerbaijan numbered fewer than five thousand. While the Red Army force had surpassed 30 thousand soldiers with the arrival of the Armenian groups". The number of Azerbaijani soldiers who fought in the battle is unknown but had to be fewer than 5,000. The first military institution, the Azerbaijani Special Corps (ASC) led by Ali-Agha Shiklinski, which was established on 26 June, consisted of fewer than 5,000 men, although their possible involvement is unclear. Ali-Agha Shiklinski's minor involvement in the battle also indicates that the ASC might have fought alongside the Ottoman army. Furthermore, an unknown number of volunteers from Aghdash, Aghstafa, Aghsu, Barda, Ganja, Goychay, Shaki, Yevlakh and Zagatala also joined the Ottoman–Azerbaijani coalition forces.

Shaumian's and the Red Army's forces were not composed of soldiers who originated from Azerbaijan. They had served previously in the Russian Imperial Army, defecting after the October Revolution. Although most of the Dashnak forces that also fought during the battle were from Western Armenia, many of them were from the Armenian Democratic Republic and the Azerbaijan Democratic Republic. In a telegraph sent to Lenin Shaumian said that the "Bolshevik–Dashnak forces showed great courage at the Battle of Goychay, but the commanders leading the army acted extremely cowardly". He also noted that anti-communist propaganda carried out by members of the British Secret Intelligence Service had a great impact on the defeat of the army.

A Russian cossack detachment in Persia, with around one thousand men, was led by Lazar Bicherakhov. Although aligned with the White movement, Bicherakhov entered into negotiations with the Baku Commissars who were trying to save the situation. They accepted his offer of assistance in the fight against the Ottoman-Azerbaijani coalition forces. His detachment arrived in Alat via the Caspian Sea from the port of Bandar-e Anzali. On 7 July, his detachment was sent to the Kyurdamir front, but suffered heavy casualties. Bicherakhov was appointed commander of the Bolshevik-Dashnak-Cossack forces under the overall supervision of the Grigory Korganov. However, Bicherakhov did not fully obey Grigory Petrov's orders, which caused confusion among the Bolsheviks, Armenians and Cossacks. On 30 July, Bicherakhov, abandoned by the Bolshevik and Armenian units that surrounded him having realized the futility of military operations against the Ottoman-Azerbaijani troops. He fled to Dagestan with his detachment, thereby exposing the northern section of the front. "I refused the command of the army of deserters and cowards", he wrote to his brother, Georgi Bicherakhov. According to Bicherakhov, over the period of the fighting, his unit lost more than 100 soldiers.

== First assault ==
=== Veysalli and Garamaryam ===
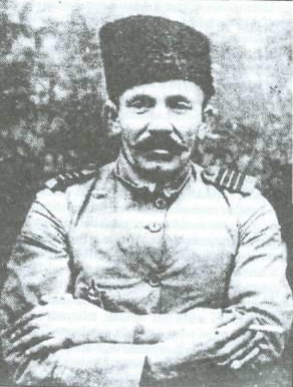
An Ottoman officer serving in Azerbaijan, c. 1918.

The headquarters of the Islamic Army of the Caucasus was located in Ganja, then known as Elisabethpol. Their members concluded there was no physical barrier between them and the railway, and this situation would pose a great threat to the capital. Nuru Pasha calculated the real threat to Ganja would come from the Red Army forces near Goychay. The clashes that had occurred in the Goychay region were a turning point for the Red Army, causing their withdrawal from Azerbaijan leading to the nation's independence.

All of the soldiers of the 5th Caucasian Infantry Division of the Caucasus Army Group had not yet reached Ganja. The 10th Caucasian Infantry Regiment crossed the Vanadzor-Dilijan road and entered Aghstafa. They reached Goychay on 15 June. Nazım Bey and his soldiers were sent to the Myusyuslyu and Kyurdamir fronts. The 10th Caucasian Infantry Regiment, led by Topal Osman, was sent to the Garamaryam front. After some days of fighting, the Ottoman forces defeated the Armenian troops, resulting in them retreating to the village of Galakar.

The Chief of Staff of the Islamic Army of the Caucasus in Myusyuslyu, Nazım Bey, instructed Osman Bey to carry out an intelligence assault on Armenian-Soviet forces. According Topal Osman's order, the 28th Battalion took action on 17 June against the Armenian-Bolshevik forces to the west of Garamaryam. Continuing the operation along the road, the 28th Battalion were caught in a Soviet ambush having failed to take timely measures. After a bloody fight, the Ottoman forces retreated to the village of Veysalli.

Seeing the situation had become dangerous, Topal Osman moved his 30th and 28th Battalions to protect both sides of the 28th Battalion. However, Bolshevik forces attacked these battalions in an area of extremely steep valleys and hills. The 29th Battalion, were attacked from both sides, were able to move to the village of Veysalli after a very bloody fight.

During the day, neither side were able to defeat the other in the hot summer weather. When darkness fell, they interrupted the clashes and moved to their original positions. This, the first significant battle of the Ottoman Islamic Army of the Caucasus in the region, resulted in failure near Garamaryam. The morale of the Bolsheviks, especially the 3rd division and its leader Hamazasp Srvandztyan, had risen dramatically. They were strengthened further in occupied Garamaryam and seized some important positions allowing an attack on Goychay.

The Ottoman–Azerbaijani coalition army lost around 200 soldiers in the first battle that occurred near the village of Garamaryam; the number of wounded was 156. The Armenian-Soviet forces captured a few cannons and ammunition from the coalition army.

=== Myusyuslyu ===
The commander of the 10th Caucasian Infantry Regiment ordered Topal Osman to distract the Bolsheviks near Garamaryam to prevent them from attacking Goychay. Topal Osman did not expect additional forces from Ganja to reach the front. The Caucasian Army of Islam troops in Myusyuslyu, under the leadership of Nazım Bey, decided to launch an intelligence attack on the Red Army forces without permission from the commander, Nuru Pasha. They launched this operation to gather information about the enemy's strength and positions. At the time of the attack, the Ottoman-Azerbaijani reserve forces were not even released. At the same time, the double envelopment manoeuvre used by the Ottoman Army in such battles were not applied.

== Second assault ==
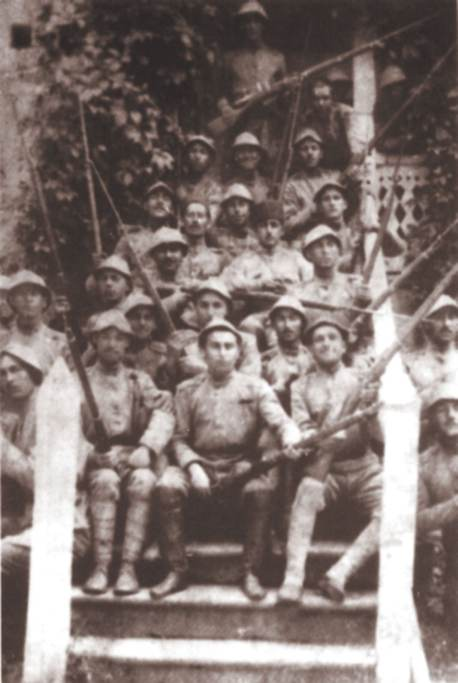
Soldiers of the Azerbaijani Democratic Republic, c. 1918.

After this defeat, Nuru Pasha, commander of a force consisting of Azerbaijanis Ali-Agha Shikhlinsky and 5th Caucasus Infantry Division chief of staff Rüştü Bey, left Ganja and arrived at Myusyuslyu Station on 18 June. There, they met with the chief of staff of the Islamic Army of the Caucasus, Nazım Bey, and commanders of the 29th Regiment in Veysalli and discussed the status of the war. Then, Nuru Pasha and few other high-ranking generals moved to Goychay, where they met with the commander of the 10th Caucasian Infantry Battalion, Lieutenant Colonel Topal Osman, and again discussed the state of the war.

According to reports, Bolshevik Red Army forces had burnt down more than 50 villages on the road between Baku and Garamaryam. They massacred many of the Azerbaijanis living in those villages. Those able to escape sought refuge in Goychay and surrounding settlements. The number of refugees from Shamakhi, Ismailly and surrounding settlements surpassed 400,000.

Red Army forces were able to recruit Armenians and Russians from surrounding villages and gather an army of 30,000 men. An attack on the Bolsheviks by the 5th Caucasian Infantry Division alone would have been suicidal.

Nuru Pasha thought thousands of Azerbaijanis would join the Islamic Army of the Caucasus after their formation, but he was wrong. The few thousand militia that joined the army did not gave Nuru Pasha the help he wanted. He went to Goychay and expressed his disappointment to the public in a speech given in the town centre. In his speech, he explained that: "The Ottoman Empire, sent soldiers to Caucasus from their homeland to liberate their Azerbaijani brothers and other Turks living in the region from the enemy's oppression". He stressed the importance of "everyone joining the army voluntarily and serving with great spirit". He also said:

Many of our soldiers fighting in this fierce warmth died of dehydration. Since you're not joining the army, at least you have to help by carrying food and water for these soldiers.

— Nuri Kiligil,

Nuru Pasha met and discussed with Azerbaijani intellectuals and elders in the Geokchaysky Uyezd. He was able to obtain their support, which resulted in more people joining the army. Many teenagers and adults from Goychay, Aghdash, Yevlakh and even Barda arrived at the front line to receive military training.

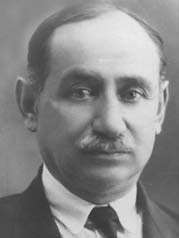
Rüştü Pasha was one of the Ottoman commanders who participated in the battle. In later years, he would write a book called Büyük harpda Bakü yollarında. 5-ci Kafkasya piyade firkası. (In the Roads of Baku, during the Great War. 5th Caucasian Infantry Regiment.), recalling the events that occurred during the Caucasus Campaign, in the perspective of the Islamic Army of the Caucasus.

Nuru Pasha had asked Eastern Army Group officers to send two important reports to Istanbul. The first report was sent on 27 June, while the second was sent on 1 July. According to these reports, the Bolsheviks were gaining power in the Caucasus, and the Azerbaijanis could not form a major force for the army. It was concluded that 5th Caucasian Infantry Division could not operate in the region. In the reports, Nuru Pasha stated that "the newly formed Caucasian Islamic Army cannot achieve success from its activities. We expected that at least 30 thousand Turks [Azeris] in here would join the army. Whereas the number of recruits is 37. Under these circumstances, to solve the Baku question, the arrival of another division would be appropriate. Muslims [Azeris] here talk much, but work less. They are coarse and greedy people. We see little to no help and selflessness from them. To ensure the liberation of Azerbaijan and Baku under these circumstances, it has become very essential for the Ottoman State to protect its faith among the people. The 5th Division needs urgent support. Otherwise, our situation would not be good at all".

The frontline between Ottoman–Azerbaijani and Red Army forces was at a stalemate. Nuru Pasha feared imminent defeat. He knew the Entente was going to launch more attacks on the Ottomans, which would result in the army not sending additional men to the Caucasus. He sent a letter to the commander of the 5th Caucasian Infantry Division, Mürsel Bey. In the letter, Nuru Pasha stated the troops would move to the lines on 23–24 June and an assault was expected to launch on 27–28 June.

During the preparations, Bolshevik spies passed along crucial information to the Red Army. The Bolsheviks launched an assault on 27 June with three battalions. Some of them moved to the north and struck the 10th Caucasian Infantry Regiment from behind. From the south, they conducted minor skirmishes to lower Ottoman morale. Meanwhile, the 25th Infantry Battalion and 2nd Cavalry Regiment, that had been requested a few days earlier, arrived and immediately became part of the 10th Caucasian Infantry Regiment. Fierce fighting resulted in the Ottoman forces successfully defending against the Bolshevik assault.

The 10th Caucasian Infantry Regiment initiated a counter-attack on the Red Army and pushed them about 3 kilometres (1.9 mi) away from their previous positions. On 29 June, the 5th Caucasus Infantry Division was preparing for its first combined operation in Azerbaijan. The initial attack was going to be carried out with the 10th and 13th Caucasian Infantry Regiments, while the 2nd Cavalry Regiment were going to attack the Bolsheviks from their left flank. At this point, the Ottoman's water, food and ammunition supplies were scarce.

Due to extremely hot weather, neither side could initiate a full assault. Ottoman water supplies were coming from Goychay. Because of supply issues, both sides were fighting with bayonets. At the end of the day Ottoman–Azerbaijani forces fully controlled western parts of the Garamaryam and partially controlled the northeastern part. Western parts of Garamaryam were flat. The Bolsheviks' retreat routes were drastically reduced because of the high hills of Aghsu to the east. The Bolshevik forces decided to flee Garamaryam as quickly as possible.

On 30 June, the Red Army launched an unsuccessful surprise attack on the 10th Caucasian Infantry Regiment. During the battle for Garamaryam, the Azerbaijani volunteer cavalry forces were led by Habib Bey Salimov.

Red Army forces launched a night attack on the 5th Caucasus Infantry Division in Goychay from their left flank with the help of local Armenian and Russian villages. The attack force consisted of about a thousand troops, two cannon and two machine guns. Bolshevik forces under the leadership of Emirov, an ethnic Armenian, launched an attack on the villages of Pazavand and Kyrdadut. The civilian population of Goychay fled to Ujar. There were no regular soldiers in the city. That night, a new volunteer cavalry division, under the leadership of General-Major Ahmad Hamdi Gara Agha Zadeh arrived at Ganja from Gazakh. They immediately marched to the city. The head of the General Staff informed the 25th Infantry Battalion of the attack and ordered them to help Goychay. The head also called for the commander of the Aghdash region, General Ali İhsan Sâbis, to help. The Azerbaijani cavalry forces under Ahmad Hamdi's leadership tried to hold off the Bolshevik forces, but were fully defeated by 7:00 am.

The 25th Infantry Battalion and some militia from the Garamaryam front had reached Goychay. Nuru Pasha, seeing that Goychay was on the verge of occupation and there was a threat of encirclement, sent some of the forces serving in Garamaryam and Aghdash to aid those defending in Goychay. The 9th Caucasian Regiment, were stationed in Poylu under the command of Cemil Cahit Toydemir, and militia from Shaki and Zagatala, led by Yusif bey Tahirov, were ordered to move to Goychay. Receiving artillery and fire support, the 25th Infantry Battalion and local militia successfully encircled the Bolshevik forces. The Bolsheviks suffered mass casualties. The rest of the now defeated Bolshevik forces fled to Garamaryam, although they were attacked by the 13th Caucasian Infantry. Afterwards, these Bolshevik forces were attacked by 5th Caucasian Infantry Division, which resulted in them suffering more casualties. Stationed in Garamaryam, the Bolshevik forces were attacked yet again. This forced them to flee east to Baku.

== Aftermath ==
Large numbers of weapons and ammunition were seized from the Red Army. Minor Armenian and Russian uprisings in Aghdash, Goychay and Ismayilli were suppressed. The coalition forces also seized their weapons. Most of the Ottoman casualties and injured personnel were sent to Ganja. Fallen Turkish soldiers were buried in Khanlar and Goranboy.

Enver Pasha was busy reviewing the battle reports. Germans did not want Ottoman forces to enter Baku, while Enver Pasha was trying to delay them. The following is from an order sent by Enver Pasha to the commanders of the Eastern Army Group on 26 June:

As moving to Baku will create a threat of Bolsheviks destroying the oil reserves in Baku, we must avoid doing this at any cost for the sake of general military goodwill and administration. For this reason, I order that the 5th Caucasian Infantry Division cannot attack Baku without my approval. Please, do not send additional forces to Nuru Pasha without my approval, and return the additional forces already sent to his command. As previously informed, Nuru Pasha will concentrate his forces and will be limited to stop the Bolshevik advance.

— Enver Pasha,

The following is from an order sent to Nuru Pasha by his brother Enver Pasha:

It is not clever to send you help. Your objective was not to move to Baku. I'm repeating that you have to concentrate your forces and stop the Bolshevik movement to Ganja

— Enver Pasha,

Enver Pasha informed the commanders of the Eastern Army Group about him "sending the 38th Infantry Division and one mountain-artillery battalion to aid Nuru Pasha via the Gazakh highway" in a secret order. Enver Pasha was trying to convince the Germans that the Ottoman Army would not enter Baku, but he was also secretly ordering Nuru Pasha to capture the oil-rich city as quickly as possible. On 2 July Enver Pasha sent a personal letter to Mehmet Esat Bülkat ordering him not to talk about the secret orders with Otto von Feldmann while he was in Batum to see the conditions of war. The following is from an order sent by Enver Pasha to the commanders of the Eastern Army Group:

Briefly speaking, I'm requesting you to prioritize the strengthening of Nuru Pasha's and our forces in Ganja with available additional soldiers, weapons and ammunition without wasting more time before the situation worsening with Feldmann's arrival, and informing of Nuru Pasha with my personal and secret letters sent to you, and not allowing Germans to know about this immoral style of communication.

— Enver Pasha,
