= Azerbaijani Special Corps =

Military unit of the Azerbaijani Democratic Republic

- Azerbaijani: Əlahiddə Azərbaycan korpusu
- Active: 26 June 1918–January 2, 1919
- Country: Azerbaijan Democratic Republic
- Branch: National Army of the Azerbaijan Democratic Republic
- Type: Special operations forces
- Size: 5,000 men
- Headquarters: Baku
- Engagements: Armenian–Azerbaijani War; Battle of Goychay (disputed); Battle of Baku

Commanders
- Commander: Ali-Agha Shikhlinsky
- Chief of Staff: Habib Bey Salimov

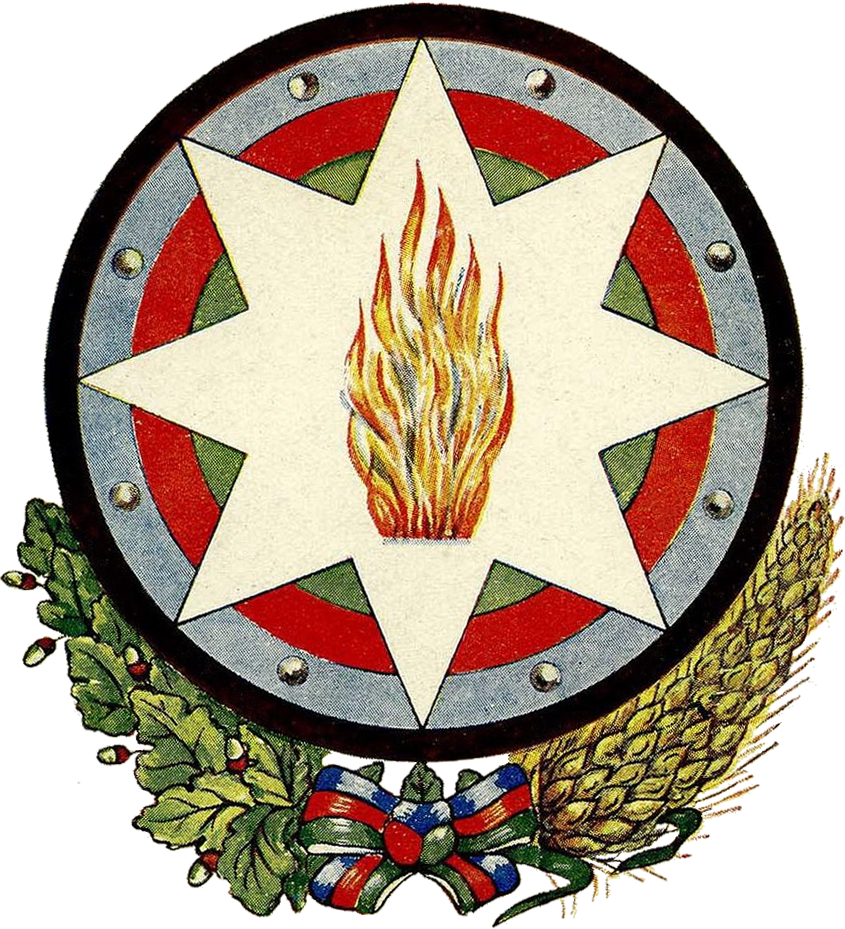
Coat of Arms of the Azerbaijan Democratic Republic

Azerbaijani Special Corps (ASC; Azerbaijani: Əlahiddə Azərbaycan korpusu), was a military unit of the Azerbaijani Democratic Republic (ADR), formed from the basis of Caucasian Native Cavalry Division, or so-called "Savage Division". It was the first military unit of ADR's National Army, consisting of 5,000 men who served in the Russian Imperial Army.

== History ==
Caucasian Native Cavalry Division, formed in 1917 was the military force of the Transcaucasian Commissariat. On 26 June 1918 government of the Azerbaijani Democratic Republic (ADR) established the Azerbaijani Special Corps, or ASC. This military unit consisted of 5,000 men who served in the Savage Division.

Coat of arms of the ASC was a silver-colored, eight-pointed star and a crescent.

Reconstruction the corps soon followed. The documents indicate that the commander-ship of the ASC was abolished. Under the order of the Islamic Army of the Caucasus, signed on 13 August, ASC must have no commander in charge, and its divisions must be subordinated to the Islamic Army of the Caucasus. With the abolition of the commander-ship, high ranking officers of ASC were also dismissed.

On September 2, 1918, the ASC was reestablished and lieutenant Ali-Agha Shikhlinsky became the commander of the corps, while colonel Habib Bey Salimov became the chief of staff. Initially, there were two infantry divisions within the ASC. The commander of the 1st Infantry Division was Colonel Cemil Cahit Bey, while the commander of the 2nd Infantry Division was Nazım Bey, both Ottoman officers. Each division consisted of three infantry regiments. In October 1918, the division consisted of three cavalry, one border, and one infantry regiment.

The existence of the ASC was formalized after the restoration of the Ministry of War. The commander-ship of ASC and its activities were concentrated in the hands of the Ministry of War. On November 15, 1918, ASC's Chief of General Staff Habib Bey Salimov was appointed chief of staff of ADR's National Army. on December 29, 1918, Ali-Agha Shikhlinsky was appointed deputy minister of the Ministry of War. Many of the high-ranking officers of ASC were assigned to new posts. Azerbaijani Corps was abolished on January 2, 1919, with the decision of the Parliament of Azerbaijan Democratic Republic.
