= Khanlar (disambiguation) =

Khanlar (Goygol) is a city and municipality and the capital of the Goygol Rayon in Azerbaijan.

Khanlar may also refer to:

== People ==
- Khanlar Hajiyev (born 1956), Azerbaijani judge
- Khanlar Maharramov (1950–1998), Azerbaijani ashiq
- Khanlar Mirza (died 1862), Persian prince of the Qajar dynasty
- Khanlar Safaraliyev (c.1878–1907), Azerbaijani oil field worker and labor organizer

== Places ==
- Bibiheybət, a municipality in Baku, Azerbaijan, formerly named "Khanlar"
- Xanlar, Goygol, a village in the Goygol District in Azerbaijan
- Khanlar, Iran, a village in Khodabandeh County, Zanjan Province, Iran
- Khanlar, West Azerbaijan, a village in Oshnavieh County, West Azerbaijan Province, Iran
- Khanlar Rayon (Goygol District), a district in Azerbaijan
