= Eastern Army Group (Ottoman Empire) =

- Active: June 7 – October 21, 1918
- Country: Ottoman Empire
- Type: Army group
- Patron: Sultans of the Ottoman Empire
- Engagements: Caucasus Campaign (World War I)

Commanders
- Notable commanders: Vehip Pasha (June 7 – June 29, 1918); Halil Pasha (June 29-October 21, 1918)

The Eastern Army Group of the Ottoman Empire (Turkish: Şark Ordular Grubu or Şark Orduları Grubu) was one of the army groups of the Ottoman Army. It was formed during World War I.

== World War I ==
=== Order of Battle, June 1918 ===
In June 1918, the army group was structured as follows:

Eastern Army Group (Ferik Vehip Pasha)

- Third Army, (Ferik Mehmed Esad Psaha)
  - VI Corps (Mirliva Hilmi Pasha)
    - 3rd Caucasian Division (Kaymakam Edib Bey)
    - 36th Caucasian Division (Kaymakam Hamdi Bey)
  - 5th Caucasian Division (Miralay Mürsel Bey)
  - 37th Caucasian Division (Miralay Köprülü Kâzım Bey)
  - Rumeli Detachment
- Ninth Army, (Mirliva Yakub Shevki Pasha)
  - I Caucasian Corps (Mirliva Kâzım Karabekir Pasha)
    - 9th Caucasian Division, 10th Caucasian Division, 15th Division
  - IV Corps (Mirliva Ali Ihsan Pasha)
    - 5th Division, 11th Division, 12th Division
  - Independent Cavalry Brigade

=== Order of Battle, September 1918 ===
In September 1918, the army group was structured as follows:

Eastern Army Group (Ferik Halil Pasha)

- Third Army, (Ferik Mehmed Esad Pasha)
  - 3rd Caucasian Division, 10th Caucasian Division, 36th Caucasian Division
- Ninth Army, (Mirliva Yakub Shevki Pasha)
  - 9th Caucasian Division, 11th Caucasian Division, 12th Division, Independent Cavalry Brigade
- Army Of Islam (Mirliva ve Fahri Ferik Nuri Pasha)
  - 5th Caucasian Division, 15th Division

== After Mudros ==
=== Order of Battle, November 1918 ===
In November 1918, the army group was structured as follows:

- Ninth Army, (Mirliva Yakub Shevki Pasha)
  - 3rd Caucasian Division (Ahıska)
  - 9th Caucasian Division (south of Erzincan)
  - 10th Caucasian Division (Batum – moving to Constantinople)
  - 11th Caucasian Division (Hoy)
  - 36th Caucasian Division (from Third Army, Gümrü)
  - 12th Division (Serdarabad)
  - Independent Cavalry Brigade
- Army Of Islam (to October 27, 1918)
  - 5th Caucasian Infantry Division (Bakü)
  - 15th Division (North Caucasus)
