= Belleau, Aisne =

Belleau
- Commune
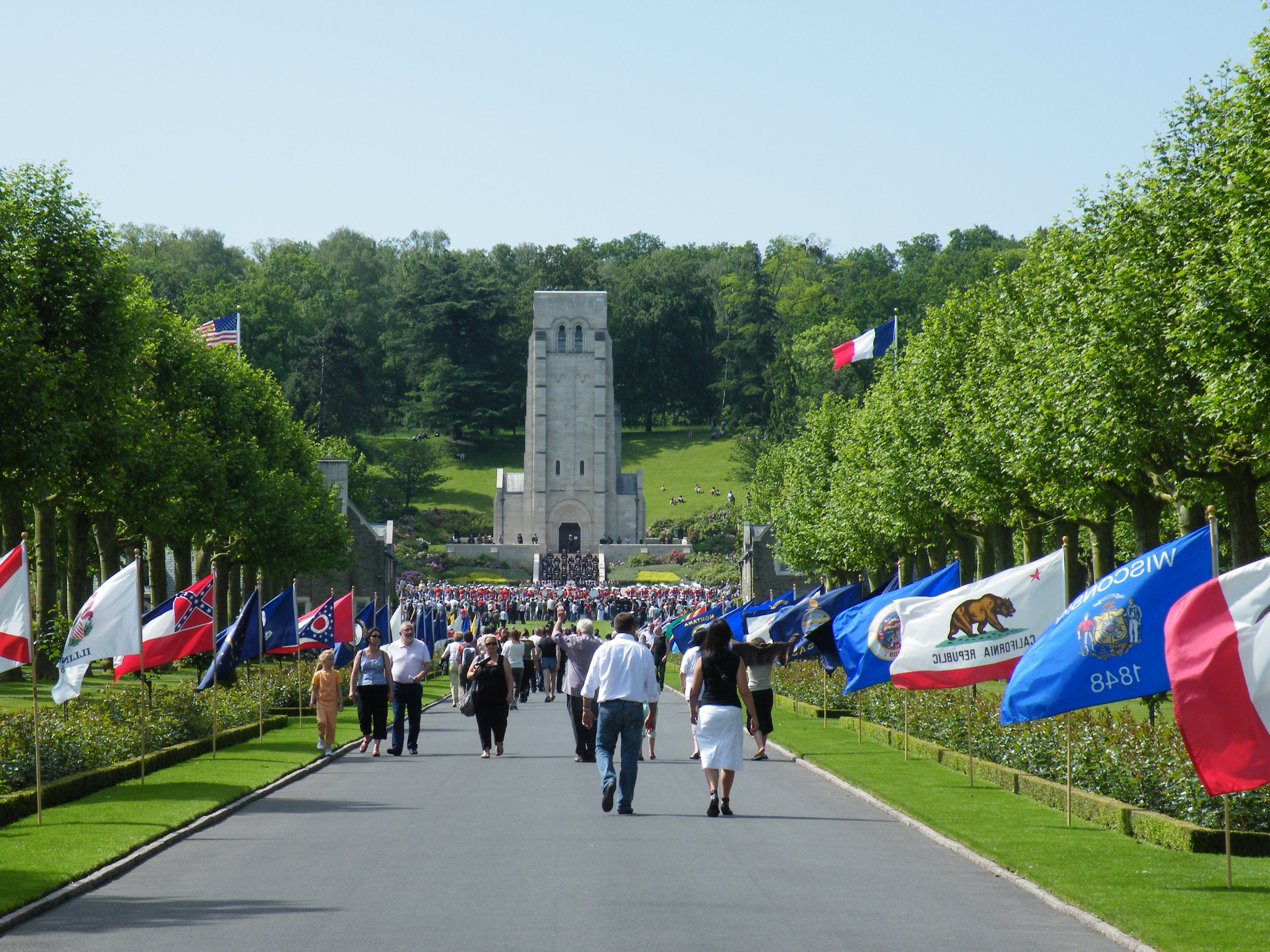
- Commemoration of the Battle of Belleau Wood, 2009

- Coat of arms
- Location of Belleau
- Location within France Location within Hauts-de-France
- Coordinates: 49°05′04″N 3°17′37″E
- Country: France
- Region: Hauts-de-France
- Department: Aisne
- Arrondissement: Château-Thierry
- Canton: Château-Thierry
- Intercommunality: CA Région de Château-Thierry

Government
  - Mayor (2026–32): Christian Brossault
- Area^{1}: 6.72 km^{2} (2.59 sq mi)
- Elevation: 106 m (348 ft)
- Highest elevation: 198 m (650 ft)
- Lowest elevation: 87 m (285 ft)
- Population (2023): 131
  - Density: 19.5/km^{2} (50.5/sq mi)
- Time zone: UTC+01:00 (CET)
  - Summer (DST): UTC+02:00 (CEST)
- INSEE/Postal code: 02062 /02400
- ^{1} French Land Register data, which excludes lakes, ponds, glaciers > 1 km^{2} (0.386 sq mi or 247 acres) and river estuaries.

Belleau (French pronunciation: [bɛlo]) is a commune in the department of Aisne in Hauts-de-France in northern France.

== Population ==
Historical population
Year	Pop.	±% p.a.
1968	117	—
1975	109	−1.01%
1982	119	+1.26%
1990	134	+1.50%
1999	135	+0.08%
2007	130	−0.47%
2012	139	+1.35%
2017	136	−0.44%
2023	131	−0.62%
Source: INSEE

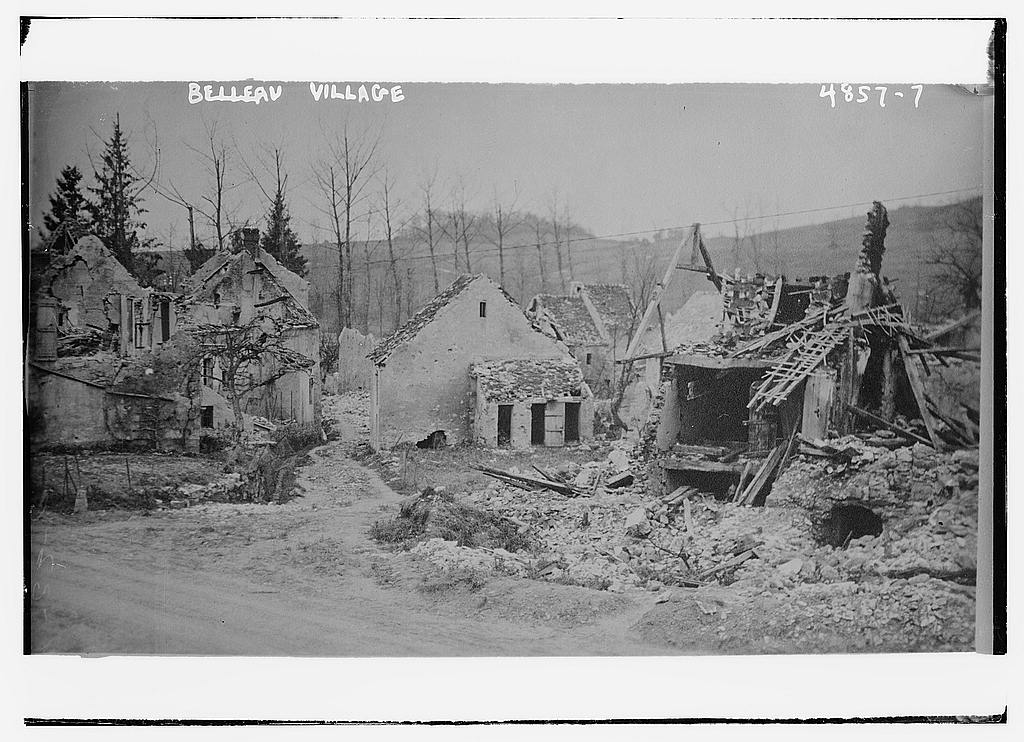
Destroyed Belleau Village in World War I

== See also ==
- Communes of the Aisne department
- Battle of Belleau Wood
- The Marine Memorial
- Aisne-Marne American Cemetery and Memorial
- American Battle Monuments Commission
