= Ellen Liiger =

Estonian actress (1918–1987)

- Born: 26 June 1918; Tallinn, Estonia
- Died: 4 August 1987 (aged 69); Tallinn, then part of Estonian SSR, Soviet Union
- Other names: Ellen Tammur; Ellen Liiger-Tammur
- Occupation: Actress
- Years active: 1924–1987
- Spouse: Ilmar Tammur
- Children: Dr. Mare Liiger

Ellen Liiger (26 June 1918 – 4 August 1987), was an Estonian stage, television, radio and film actress and theatre teacher. Her stage career began at age six and lasted until she died in 1987.

== Early life and education ==
Ellen Liiger was born in Tallinn to parents Jaan Liiger and Mari Liiger (née Treufeldt) in 1918. She was the youngest of three siblings; her brother Eduard was born in 1907 and her sister Hilda-Alice was born in 1910. She had one half-sibling, Arnold Liiger, born in 1902, from her father's first marriage to Reet Liiger (née Närska). Her father worked as a small business owner.

Liiger attended Tallinn 1st Girls' Secondary School, graduating in 1937. Afterward, she studied theatre and acting at the Tallinn Conservatory of Dramatic Arts School (now, the Estonian Academy of Music and Theatre), graduating in 1941.

== Stage career ==
In 1924, at age six, Ellen Liiger began appearing onstage in small roles for children at the Estonia Theatre in Tallinn. Her stage debut was a small role in a 1924 production of Polish dramatist Tadeusz Rittner's 1916 play Wolves at Night. After graduation from theatre school in 1941, she became engaged at the Estonian Drama Theatre while the country was under German occupation. She would remain an actress at the theatre until leaving in 1960 for an engagement at the Vanemuine theatre in Tartu, which lasted until 1966. In 1967, she would rejoin the Estonian Drama Theatre, remaining there until 1987; the year of her death.

Throughout her many years on the stages of Estonia, she appeared in numerous stage productions of works by such international authors and playwrights as: George Bernard Shaw, Brecht and Weill, Molière, Maxim Gorky, Leo Tolstoy, Anton Chekhov, Mikhail Lermontov, István Örkény, Nikolai Gogol, Max Halbe, Clare Booth, and Erich Kästner, among others. Additionally, she performed in a number of productions of works by Estonian authors and playwrights as: A. H. Tammsaare, August Kitzberg, Henrik Visnapuu, Aadu Hint, Jaan Kruusvall, Jaan Kross, and Egon Rannet.

As well as appearing onstage as an actress, Liiger later became a drama teacher at the University of Tartu, Tallinn Pedagogical Institute (now, Tallinn University), and the Estonian Drama Theatre.

== Television, radio and film career ==
Ellen Liiger also performed as a radio and television actress; although, not as prolific in these mediums as her stage career. Several plays featuring Liiger were broadcast on Estonian television. Some of the more memorable radio plays include Kippari unerohi (1955), Tsitadell (1956), and Paadiga metsas (1967).

Liiger made her film debut in a small, uncredited role in the 1951 Herbert Rappaport directed Valgus Koordis for Lenfilm. The film is notable as being the second Estonian feature film made following the annexation of the country by the Soviet Union (the first being 1947's Elu tsitadellis), and starring Estonian singer Georg Ots. The plot of Valgus Koordis follows the struggle of a small village to set up a collective farm after the end of World War II. The film was based on a story of the same name by author Hans Leberecht.

Liiger's first substantial film role came in 1966 when she played the role of Helmentiine in the Veljo Käsper directed black and white drama Tütarlaps mustas for Tallinnfilm. The film was adapted from a short story penned by Estonian author Lilli Promet. Another prominent film role was that of the character Praakli's wife in the 1981 Arvo Kruusement directed drama Karge meri, also for Tallinnfilm. The film was based on the 1938 novel of the same name by August Gailit.

== Personal life ==
Ellen Liiger was married to actor Ilmar Tammur, who died in 1989. The couple had a daughter, Mare Liiger, who became a medical doctor. Ellen Liiger died in Tallinn in 1987 at age 69 of gastric cancer.

== Acknowledgements ==
- Merited Artist of the Estonian SSR (1955)
- Order of the Red Banner of Labour (1956)
- People's Artist of the Estonian SSR (1957)
