= Veysəlli, Goychay =

Veysəlli
- Municipality
- Location within Azerbaijan
- Coordinates: 40°32′41″N 47°54′35″E
- Country: Azerbaijan
- Rayon: Goychay

Population
  - Total: 278
- Time zone: UTC+4 (AZT)
  - Summer (DST): UTC+5 (AZT)

Veysəlli (also, Veysalli and Veyselli) is a village and municipality in the Goychay Rayon of Azerbaijan. It has a population of 278.
