= Action of Arsuf =

- Part of Middle Eastern theatre of World War I
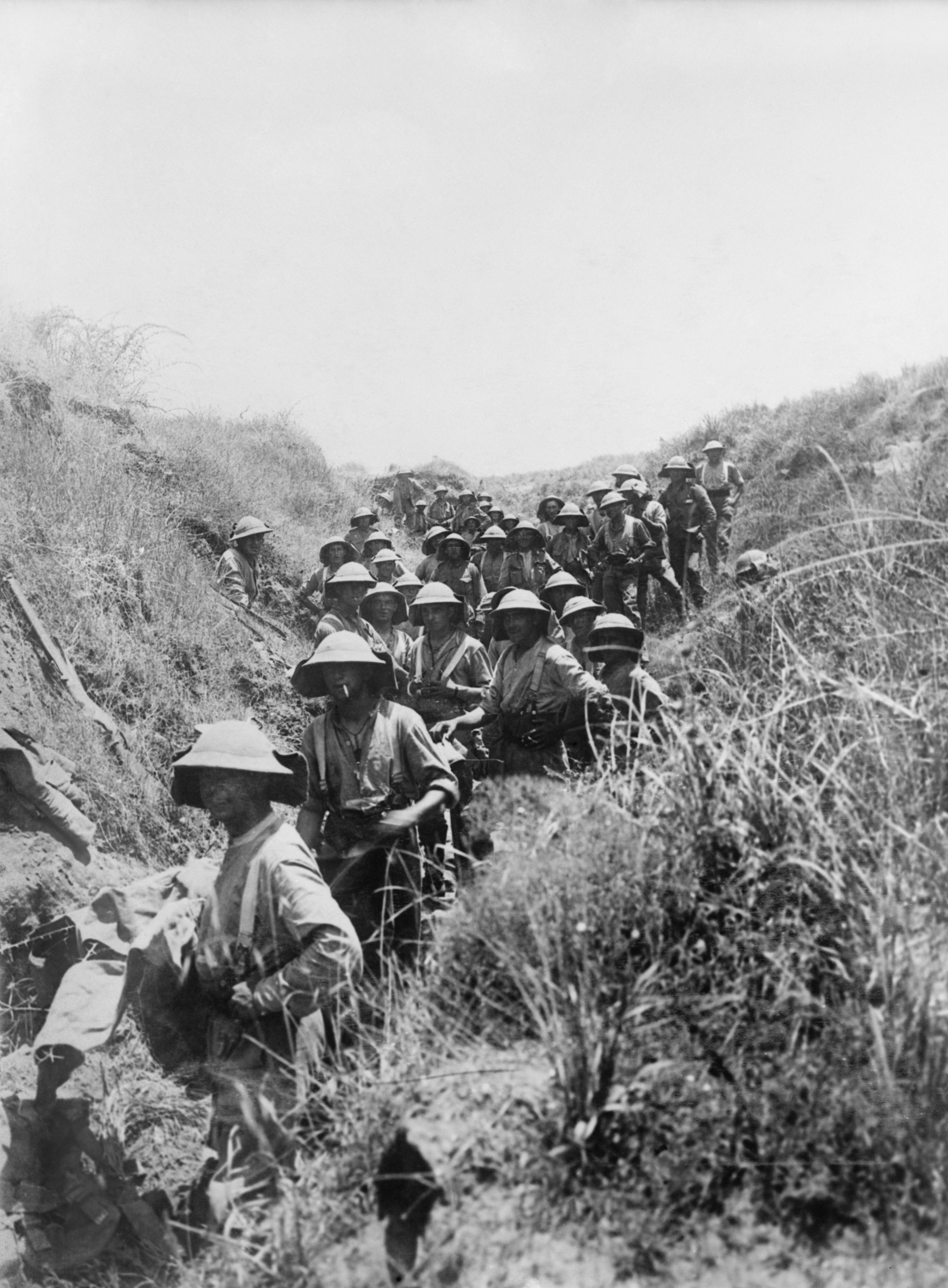
- 2nd Battalion Black Watch in trenches on Brown Ridge after the action at Arsuf
Date	8 June 1918
Location	Apollonia-Arsuf
Result	British victory

Units involved
(British Raj) 21st (Bareilly) Brigade	(Ottoman Empire) Ottoman 7th Division

Casualties and losses
62 killed and 110 wounded	Approx. 300 POWs and 217 killed in action

The action of Arsuf (8 June 1918), was fought between the forces of the British Empire and those of the Central Powers, namely the Ottoman Empire, German Empire and Austria-Hungary, during the Sinai and Palestine Campaign of the First World War. The British Empire forces involved was the 21st (Bareilly) Brigade comprising the 2nd Battalion, Black Watch, the 1st Guides Infantry, the 29th Punjabis and the 1/8th Gurkha Rifles.

On 8 June 1918 the 21st (Bareilly) Brigade, part of the 7th (Meerut) Division, was tasked with the capture of two hills, 1 mile (1.6 km) from the Mediterranean Sea known as the two sisters, defended by elements of the Ottoman 7th Division. The hills were being used as observation posts and the intention was to deprive the Turkish forces of their use. The successful assault was carried out by the Black Watch and the Guides Infantry. The Turkish forces responded with two counter-attacks of their own. The first succeeded in recapturing a section of their previous position before being driven back. The second counter-attack was defeated before they managed to reach the British position. The Turkish forces suffered "considerable" losses, and four officers and 101 other ranks were taken prisoner. Equipment captured included two heavy and five light machine guns.

The capture of the two Turkish positions greatly improved the British position. Their loss deprived the Turkish forces an observation post that overlooked a large portion of the British lines and rear areas. They also now gave the British their own observation post that could see the Turkish rear areas. There capture was significant enough to be mentioned in army despatches.
