= Grigory Korganov =

Armenian revolutionary and communist activist (1886-1918)

- Григорий Корганов
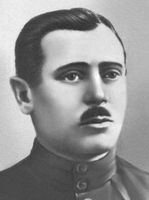

People's Commissar for Military and Navy Affairs of the Baku Commune
- In office 1 April 1918 – 20 September 1918

Personal details
- Born: 30 July 1886 Tiflis, Russian Empire (now Tbilisi, Georgia)
- Died: 20 September 1918 (aged 32) 207th verst of the Trans-Caspian Railway between the stations of Akhcha-Kuima and Pass, Krasnovodsk district, Trans-Caspian region, RSFSR
- Citizenship: Russian
- Education: Imperial Moscow University

Grigory Nikolayevich Korganov (Russian: Григорий Николаевич Корганов; Armenian: Գրիգոր Նիկոլի Կորղանյան, romanized: Grigor Nikoli Korganyan; 30 July 1886 – 20 September 1918) was an Armenian Bolshevik revolutionary and communist activist. He was one of the 26 Baku Commissars and Bolshevik Party leaders in the Caucasus during the Russian Revolution.

== Biography ==
=== Early years ===
Korganov was born in Tiflis in the Armenian family of a military officer. From 1907 he attended Moscow University and headed the Caucasian student association, but he was expelled due to his revolutionary work. After finishing his studies in 1914, he served in the Army as an officer during World War I and was sent to the Caucasian Front where he conducted revolutionary propaganda.

=== October Revolution, Baku Commune and death of Korganov ===
After the October Revolution he became Chairman of the Revolutionary Army in the Caucasus and, from March 1918, member of the Committee of the Revolutionary Defense of Baku. From April 1918 he became Commissar of military and naval affairs for the Baku Commune and from the spring of 1918 he headed the Soviet Armed Forces. When the Commune was toppled by the Centro Caspian Dictatorship, a British-backed coalition of Dashnaks, SRs and Mensheviks, Korganov and his comrades were captured by British troops and executed by a firing squad between the stations of Pereval and Akhcha-Kuyma of the Transcaucasian Railroad.

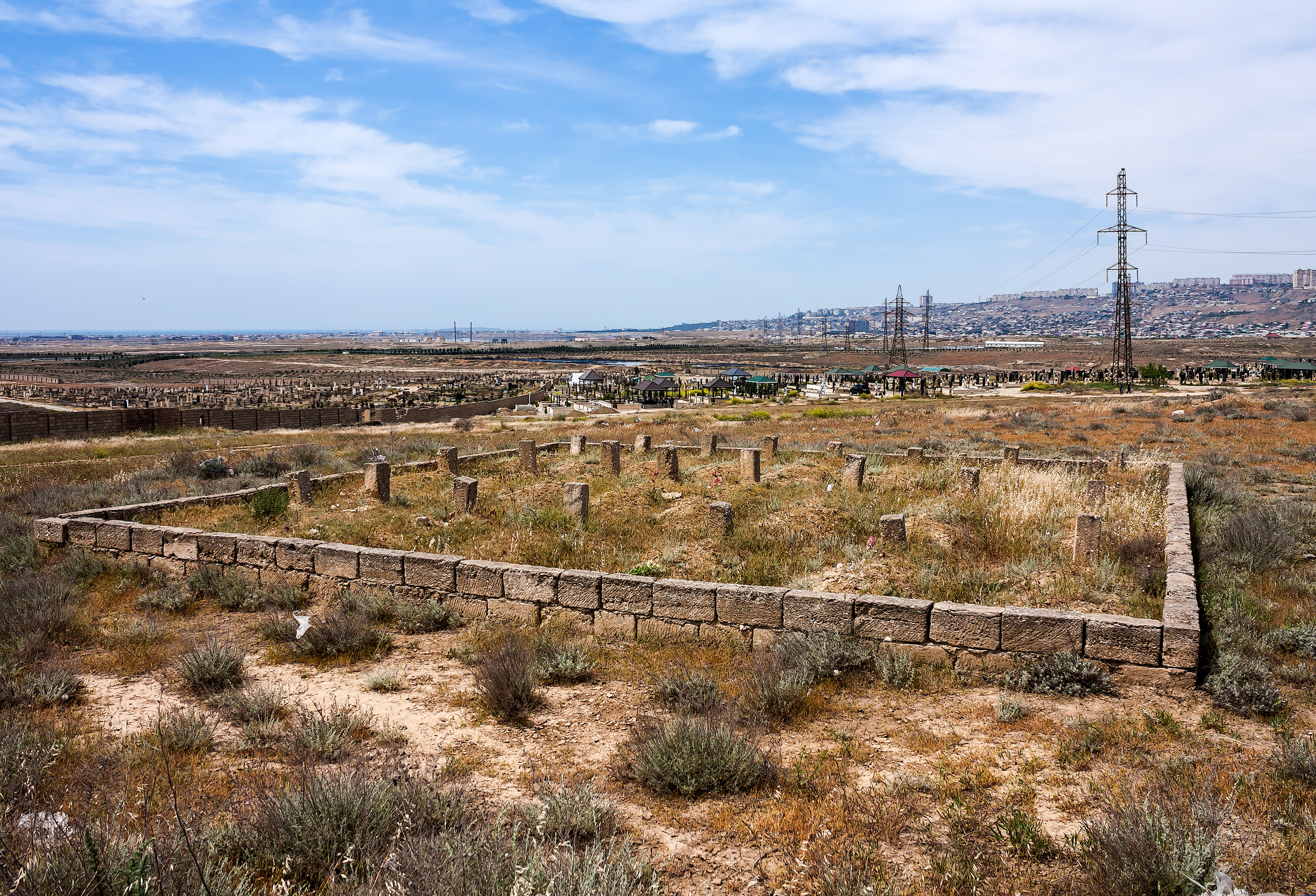
The burial site of the 26 Baku commissars. Hovsan Cemetery
