= Bijo, Azerbaijan =

Bijo Bico
- Municipality village
- Location within Azerbaijan
- Coordinates: 40°27′43″N 48°28′34″E
- Country: Azerbaijan
- Rayon: Agsu

Area
  - Total: 4,324 km^{2} (1,670 sq mi)
- Elevation: 60–929 m (197–3,048 ft)

Population (2012)
  - Total: 1,860
- Time zone: UTC+4 (AZT)
  - Summer (DST): UTC+5 (AZT)

Bijo (also, Bijoy, Bidzhov) is a village and municipality in the Aghsu district (Agsu Rayon) of the Republic of Azerbaijan. It has a population of 1,860 as of 2012

== Etymology ==
Some sources indicates the name of village as "Bijoy" or "Bija". During the Tsar Russian and most part of the Soviet empires periods it has been mainly called as "Bijov" or "Bidzov".

Though it would not be realistic to strict upon one of the versions about the etymology of "Bojo", the two of them are grounded on more reliable sources as well as reasonable explanation methods:

1. It comes from the name of "pechoys" or a pecheneg tribes that is related to Oghuz Turks.
2. It is from the same origin which is used in the name of the country - Azerbaijan. In Middle Ages the name "Azerbaijan" has been mostly used as "Azerbijan" ("أذربيجان") in Arabic alphabet.

== History ==
Bijo is one of the ancient village of Azerbaijan. Although its history has not yet been investigated properly, the obvious evidence inform us the ancient and rich culture of Bijo.

== Culture ==
=== Bijo rugs ===
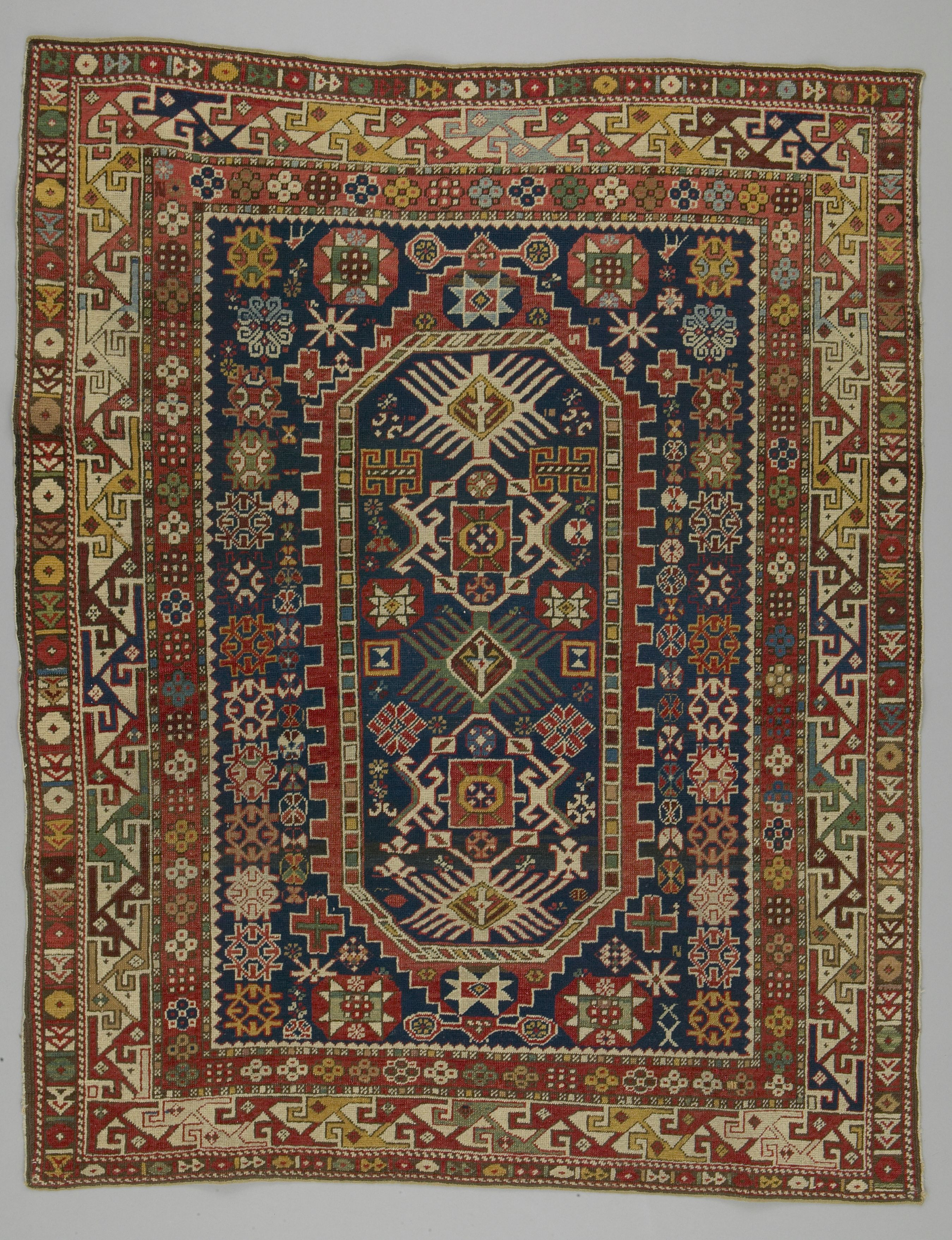
Carpet of the 19th century from Bijo. Textile Museum of Canada
