= Nuri Killigil =

Ottoman general (1889–1949)

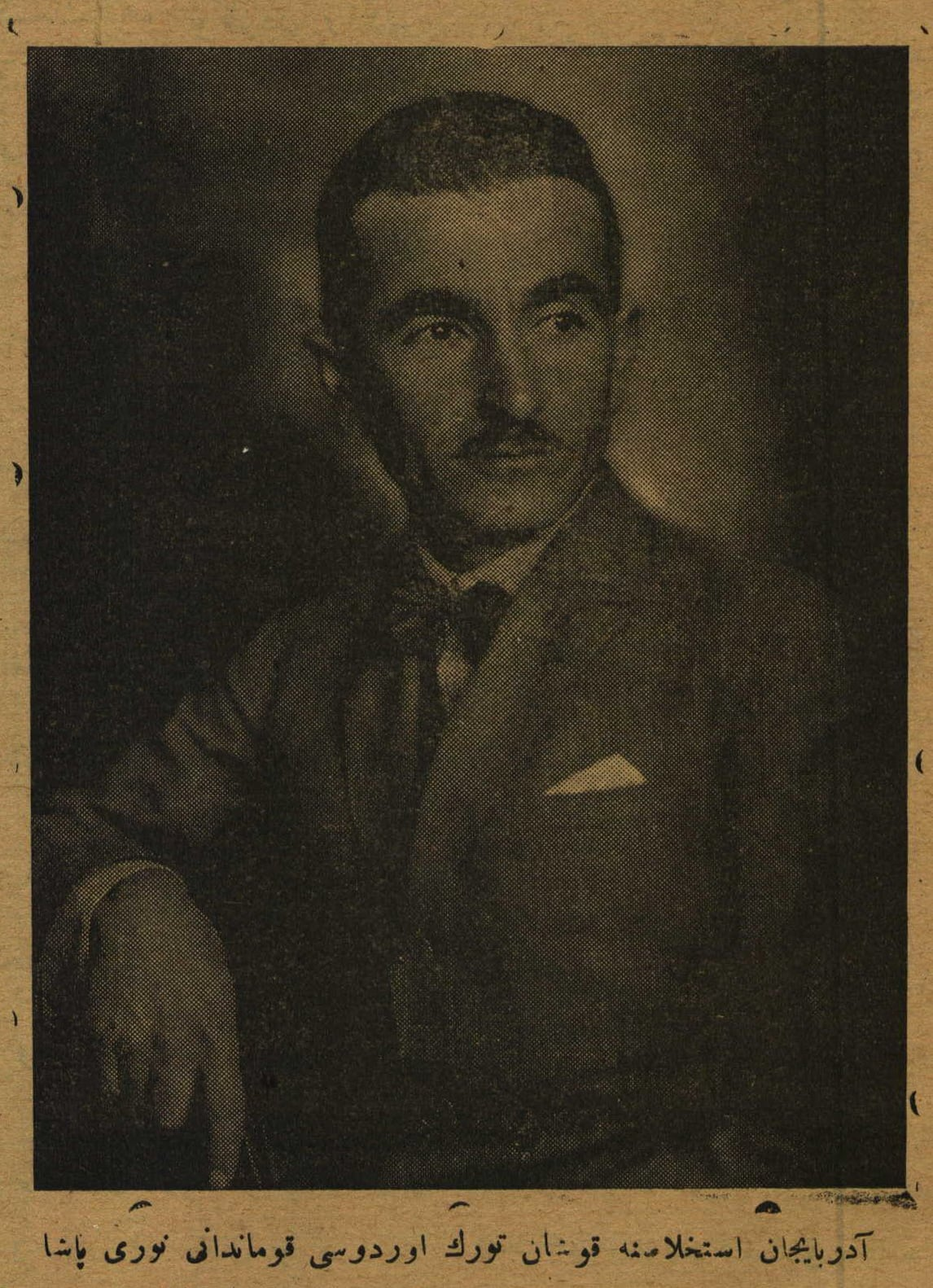
- Born: 1889; Manastır, Ottoman Empire
- Died: 2 March 1949 (aged 59–60); Sütlüce, Istanbul, Turkey
- Military career
- Allegiance: Ottoman Empire
- Branch: Ottoman Army
- Service years: 1911–1919
- Rank: Lieutenant general
- Commands: Islamic Army of the Caucasus
- Conflicts: Italo-Turkish War; First World War; Senussi campaign; Caucasus campaign; Battle of Baku; Battle of Goychay; Battle of Binagadi; Battle of Aghsu

Nuri Killigil, also known as Nuri Pasha (Turkish: Nuri Paşa; c. 1889– died; 1949) was an Ottoman general in the Ottoman Army. He was the half-brother of Ottoman Minister of War, Enver Pasha.

== Military career ==
=== Libya ===
Infantry Machine-Gun Captain Nuri Bey was sent to Libya on a German ship with Major Jafar al-Askari Bey and 10,000 pieces of gold. His mission was to organize and coordinate operations of Teşkilat-ı Mahsusa forces with local forces against Italian and British forces. They landed on the shore between Tobruk and Sallum on February 21, 1915, and then went to Ahmed Sharif es Senussi in Sallum. In 1917, in an attempt to organize the efforts which was dispersed by the British, the Ottoman General Staff established the "Africa Groups Command" (Afrika Grupları Komutanlığı), of which the primary objective was the coastal regions of Libya. Lieutenant Colonel Nuri Bey was appointed its first commander and his chief of staff was Staff Major Abdurrahman Nafiz Bey (Gürman).

=== Caucasus ===
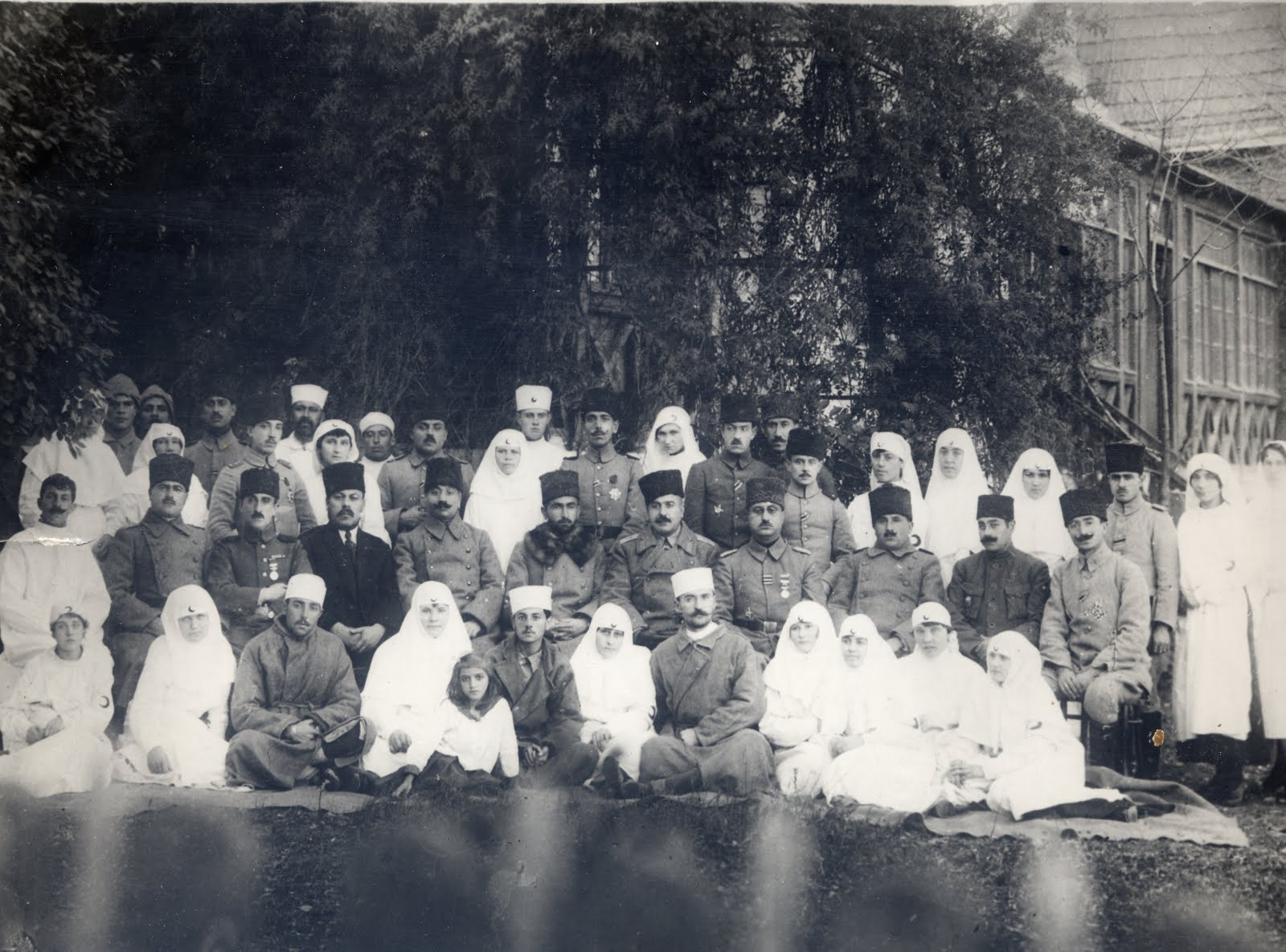
Staff officers of the Army of Islam with Nuri Pasha (Killigil) in the centre (middle row) and staff of the Ministry of Health of the Azerbaijan Democratic Republic in Yelizavetpol

Nuri Bey's elder brother Enver Pasha, commander of the Ottoman Army, who saw an opportunity in the Caucasus after the Russian Revolution took Russia out of World War I, called back Nuri Bey from Libya. He was promoted to Mirliva Fahri (honorary) Ferik and gave the mission to form and command the volunteer-based Islamic Army of the Caucasus. Nuri Bey arrived in Elizabethpol (present day: Ganja) on May 25, 1918, and began to organize his forces. The Army of Islam was formed officially on July 10, 1918. Liberation of the Caucasus campaign begun and fierce fighting happened between Bolshevik Baku Commune-Armenians Dashnaktsutyun and Islamic Army of the Caucasus. The Islamic Army of the Caucasus led by Nuri Pasha took control of the whole Azerbaijan and the capital Baku on 15 September 1918. During this time, Nuri presided over the massacre of 30,000 Armenian civilians in the city of Baku.

At the end of the war, Nuri was arrested by British troops and held in detention in Batum, awaiting trial for wartime crimes. In August 1919, his supporters ambushed guards escorting him and helped him escape to Erzurum.

== Later life ==
In 1938, Killigil bought a coal mining plant in Turkey. He began to organize the production of guns, bullets, gas masks, and other war equipment. After some time, he announced the end of the production of weapons, but still secretly continued production.

Killigil established contact with Franz von Papen, the Nazi ambassador in Ankara in 1941 in order to win German support for the Pan-Turkic cause. With his assistance, the Turkestan Legion was formed by the Germans. During World War II, Killigil was in Germany, attempting to develop strong relationships between Nazi Germany and Turkey and achieve the recognition of the independence of Azerbaijan. He was unsuccessful. In September 1941, Killigil offered to organize an anti-Soviet, pan-Turkic uprising in the Caucasus, but the Germans declined the offer. In 1942, Killigil ordered his factories to send weapons and ammo to the Azerbaijani Legion which had been recently formed under the command of Abdurrahman Fatalibeyli.

== Death ==
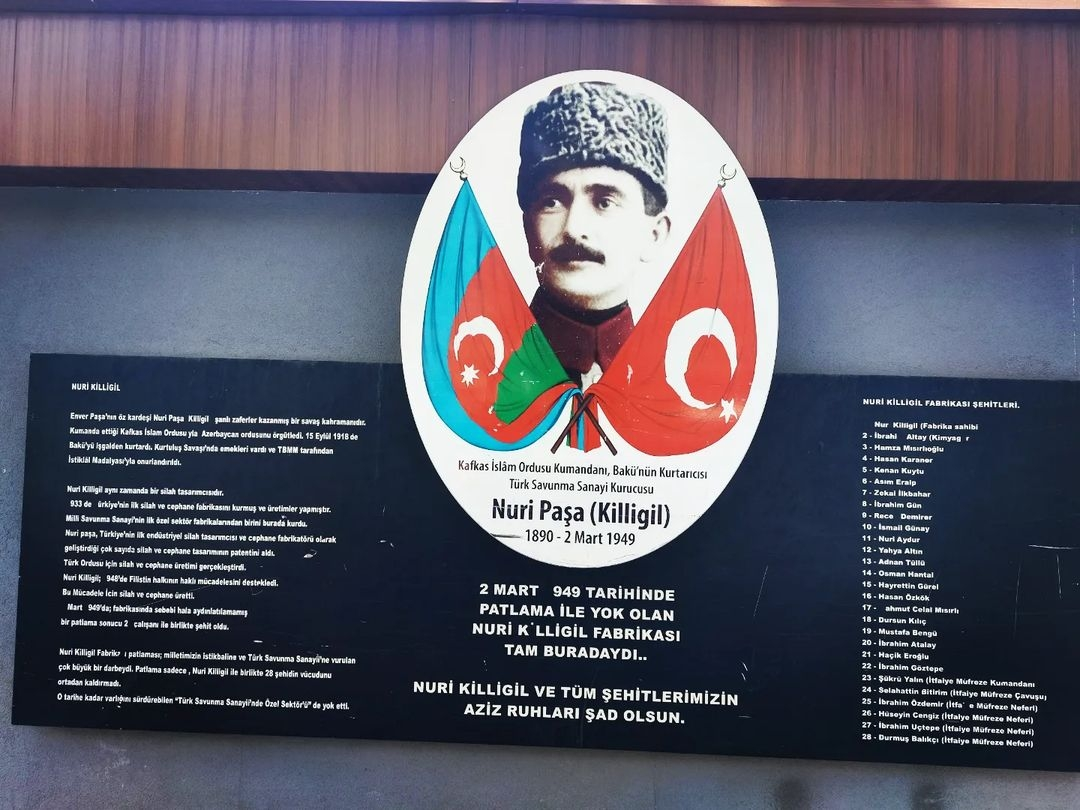
Nuri Killigil's memorial in Istanbul

Killigil was killed on 2 March 1949 by an explosion in his weapons factory in Istanbul that also killed 28 other people. He was buried without a proper funeral ceremony at the time, as it was viewed as contrary to religious beliefs for dismembered corpses. A formal funeral service, attended by the Azerbaijani politician Ganira Pashayeva and representatives from the Municipality of Istanbul, was only held in 2016.
