= Ağdağ, Goygol =

Village in Goygol, Azerbaijan

Ağdağ
- village
- Location within Azerbaijan
- Coordinates: 40°33′39″N 46°19′52″E
- Country: Azerbaijan
- Rayon: Goygol
- Elevation: 767 m (2,516 ft)

Population (2008)
  - Total: 19,079
- Time zone: UTC+4 (AZT)

Ağdağ, Xanlar (?–12.06.2018) (also, Khanlar) is a small village in the Goygol Rayon of Azerbaijan. It is just south of the city of Goygol.
