= Qaraməryəm =

- Municipality
- Location within Azerbaijan
- Coordinates: 40°36′58″N 48°01′08″E
- Country: Azerbaijan
- Rayon: Goychay

Population
  - Total: 1,145
- Time zone: UTC+4 (AZT)
  - Summer (DST): UTC+5 (AZT)

Qaraməryəm (also, Karamar’yan and Yukhary Karamar’yan) is a village and municipality in the Goychay Rayon of Azerbaijan. It has a population of 1,145.
