= Prokofy Dzhaparidze =

Azerbaijani politician

Prokofy "Alyosha" Dzhaparidze Прокофий "Алёша" Джапаридзе (in Russian) პროკოფი ჯაფარიძე (in Georgian) Alyoşa Caparidze (in Azerbaijani)
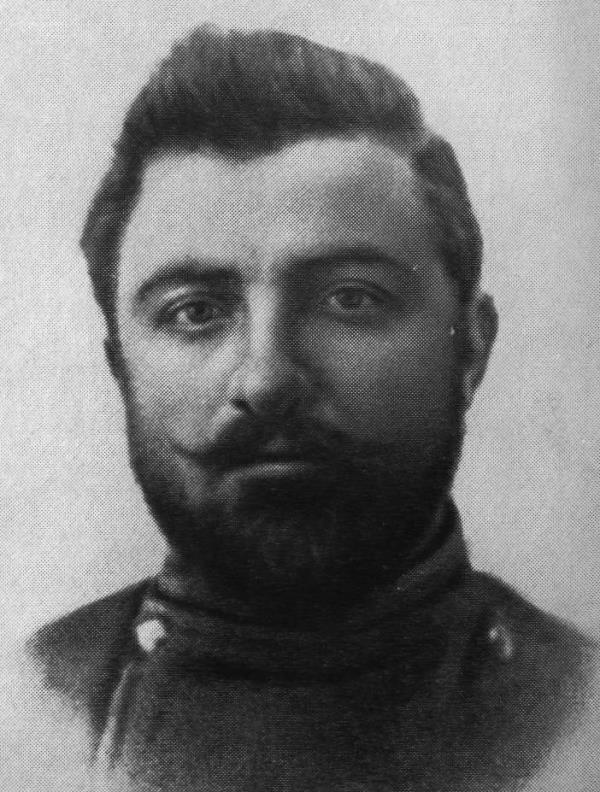
- Bolshevik revolutionary Prokofy Dzaparidze

Chairman of the Executive Committee of the Baku Commune

Personal details
- Born: January 15, 1880 Racha, Russian Georgia
- Died: September 20, 1918 (aged 38) Krasnovodsk, Turkmenistan
- Party: RSDLP (1898–1903); RSDLP (Bolsheviks) (1903–1918)
- Occupation: Politician, revolutionary

Prokofy "Alyosha" Aprasionovich Dzhaparidze or Japaridze, (Georgian: პროკოფი აფრასიონის ძე ჯაფარიძე, Russian: Прокофий Апрасионович Джапаридзе; 15 January 1880 – 20 September 1918), was a Bolshevik revolutionary of Georgian origin. He was one of the leaders of the Red Army and the Bolshevik Party in Azerbaijan during the Russian Revolution.

Dzhaparidze joined Bolsheviks in 1898 where he earned the nickname Alyosha, then moved to Baku. Helping the founding of the Azerbaijani socialist party Hummet, he became Delegate of the Caucasian Union of the RSDLP at the 3rd Congress of the RSDLP in London. He was arrested or exiled many times for his anti-tsarist activities in the Russian Empire.

After the February Revolution, he became a member of the Caucasian Regional Committee, and became one of the 26 leaders or commissars of the Baku Commune. He took several different positions in the commune. Dzhaparidze, along with Stepan Shaumian, Mashadi Azizbekov, Ivan Fioletov and other commissars tried to spread the communist ideology throughout the whole Caucasus. Soon after the fall of the commune, on the night of September 20, he was executed by firing squad at a remote location between the stations of Pereval and Akhcha-Kuyma on the Trans-Caspian railway along with other Commissars.

Dzhaparidze was one of the main four commissars who gained a notable status in the Soviet Union as a fallen hero of the Russian Revolution. A street in Sochi (Russia) is still named after him and he has a small bust in Moscow. His monument in Baku, capital of the Republic of Azerbaijan, was demolished in 2009.

== Biography ==
=== Early life and ancestry ===
Prokofy Dzhaparidze was born in Schardometi village of Racha, Kutais Governorate in the Russian Empire (present-day Racha-Lechkhumi and Kvemo Svaneti, Republic of Georgia) into the untitled petite branch of the House of Japaridze, then part of the Georgian nobility. He was the son of Aprasion Dzhaparidze, a landowner, dvoryanin of Kutaisi and his wife, Anna Gotsiridze. As his father died very early, the family soon became impoverished. Prokofy had to go to a village school and learnt the profession of a bootmaker.

He was educated at the Alexandrovsk Teachers Institute in Tbilisi, Dzhaparidze joined the Russian Social Democratic Labour Party in 1898. He participated in the preparation of the May Day demonstration in 1900. He was arrested and held in jail 11 months, and then was sent home. In 1901, he led a strike of tobacco workers in Kutaisi.

In 1904 he moved to Baku, became one of the founders of Gummet organization, set up to do political work amongst Muslims, which grew into a mass organisation, drawing large masses of Muslim people behind the Bolsheviks. Some of its most known members included Meshadi Azizbekov, Nariman Narimanov and Sultan Majid Afandiyev. He led delegate of the Caucasian Union of the RSDLP at the 3rd Congress of the RSDLP in London. He was one of the leaders of the December strike of the workers in Baku, also actively participated in the publishment of the Bolshevik journals and magazines Bakisnkie Rabochi, Gudok and Bakinski prolitari.

In 1909 he was arrested and exiled to the North Caucasus for five years. He lived in Rostov-on-Don. In 1913 he returned to Tbilisi, present-day capital of Georgia.

In preparation for the 1915 May Day demonstration was exiled to Vologda Province, where in 1916 he fled to Petrograd, and then to Tbilisi.

=== Baku Commune ===
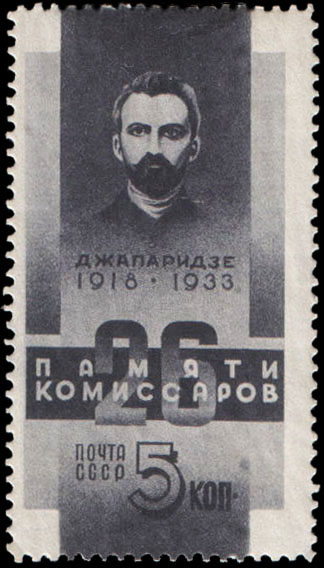
USSR postcard dedicated to Dzhaparidze in 1933.

Funeral of 26 Baku Commissars in 1920 (crying woman is the mother of Mir Hasan Vezirov).

After the February Revolution of 1917, Dzhaparidze was a member of the Baku Committee of the Bolshevik Party (see Baku Commune); as a delegate to the 6th congress of the Bolshevik Party, he was selected as a candidate member of its Central Committee, and became a member of Caucasian Border Committee. From December 1917 Deputy Chairman, during January–July 1918 the chairman of the executive committee of the Baku Soviet.

During March, Dzhaparidze was the member of the Committee of Revolutionary Defense in Baku; from April, he was the Commissar for Internal Affairs in Baku, and, from June, he also served as Commissar for Food. During this time, he was actively involved in March Events, as he tried to spread the communist ideology to Azerbaijan and the whole South Caucasus in general.

After the fall of Baku to the Azerbaijani-Turkish Army of Islam in the Battle of Baku, he fled to Krasnovodsk. On September 20, 1918, he was one of the 26 Baku Commissars shot by the local government of the Socialist Revolutionary Party. His legacy was appreciated highly across the Soviet Union. However, in post-Soviet Azerbaijan, the places named after Dzhaparidze were renamed and his monument was demolished. His grave was also relocated along with the other commissars in Baku, which was strongly opposed by the Azerbaijan Communist Party and other local left-wing politicians. In his native Georgia, the name of Dzhaparidze was also removed almost everywhere.

The blood of your never cool - never!

26 —
Dzhaparidze and Shahumyan!

— Vladimir Mayakovsky

== See also ==
- 26 Baku Commissars
- Stepan Shahumyan
- Meshadi Azizbekov
