= Jalal Garyaghdi =

Cəlal Qaryağdı
- Born: Cəlal Məhərrəm oğlu Qaryağdı; June 2, 1914; Shusha, Elizavetpol Governorate, Russian Empire
- Died: January 1, 2001 (aged 86); Baku, Azerbaijan
- Known for: sculptor
- Awards: Honored Art Worker of the Azerbaijan SSR (1954), People’s Artist of the Azerbaijan SSR (1960)

Jalal Maharram oglu Garyaghdi (Azerbaijani: Cəlal Məhərrəm oğlu Qaryağdı; 2 June 1914, Shusha, Elisabethpol Governorate, Russian Empire – 1 January 2001 Baku, Azerbaijan) was an Azerbaijani monumentalist sculptor and People's Painter of Azerbaijan SSR (1960). He was one of the pioneer monumentalist sculptors of Azerbaijan, along with Fuad Abdurahmanov.

== Life and works ==
Jalal Garyaghdi was born on 2 June 1914 in Shusha. He was keen on painting and modeling in his school years. After graduating from the secondary school, he was sent to Baku and entered Azerbaijan State College of Arts. Such eminent Russian realist artists as Gerasimov, Pridatok and Kosichkin taught at that school at the time. The latter had a great role in the development of Garyaghdi's interest in landscape painting. While studying at the college, he attended the studios of Yelizaveta Tripolskaya and Pinhas Sabsai.

After graduating from college in Baku, he entered the Tbilisi State Academy of Arts, where he was admitted in the class of sculptor and pedagogue professor Iakob Nikoladze (1976–1951), in 1934. Nikoladze's teaching system was based on thorough and attentive study of landscape. He helped Garyaghdi develop the skill of seeing nature and giving it sharp plastic forms. Results of Nikoladze's system are reflected in earlier works of Garyaghdi. Even during his education, he made a bas-relief of Alexander Pushkin timed to the poet's anniversary in 1937.

After returning to Baku, Garyaghdi started working independently. The bas-relief portrait of Shota Rustaveli and the sculptural figure of young Stalin were among his works created in that period. Two-metre tall sculpture of a kolkhoz farmer man, which was used in the design of the Gagajukh-chab pipe (a line of Samur-Davachi canal) along with a monumental statue of a kolkhoz farmer woman by Yelizaveta Tripolskaya and bas-reliefs of Pinhas Sabsai, was one of Garyaghdi's first monumental works.

The statues Kolkhoz farmer, Vagif, the bas-relief sketch Farhad, cleaving the Bisutun rock, the project of Nizami's monument, portraits of Stalin, Dzhaparidze and Fioletov – all these works are related to pre-wartime period. Garyaghdi taught at the Azerbaijan State College of Arts for many years. In 1954, he was awarded with the honorary title of Honoured Art Worker of the Azerbaijan SSR for his creative activity. Portraits of Bulbul, Rashid Behbudov, Jahangir Jahangirov, Khurshidbanu Natavan, Mirza Alakbar Sabir and Niyazi are considered the best creations of the sculptor. Sculptural portrait of Gara Garayev (1965) is among the best portrait images by Garyaghdi. Compositional portraits such as Young girl, Kamancha player, Tar player and others occupy a distinct place in Garyaghdi's creative work. In 1950, the Ministry of Culture of Azerbaijan announced a contest for the best project of a monument to Vladimir Lenin to be installed at the Government House of Azerbaijan. Jalal Garyaghdi won this contest. The work on the image of Lenin lasted for four years. The sculptor thoroughly researched the approaches of Nikolay Andreyev, Sergey Merkurov and Matvey Manizer, who created the best sculptures of Lenin in the Soviet Union. In 1955, the 11-metre bronze sculpture was installed.

In the mid-1950s, Garyaghdi began to work on a monument to Sabir, an Azerbaijani satirical poet of the nineteenth century which was erected in 1958 in the centre of Baku, in a garden named after the poet replacing a monument of the poet made by Keylikhis in 1922. The bronze sculpture was thoroughly harmonized with its pedestal (architects Ismayilov and Alizadeh). The most significant works of the sculptor, created in the 1970s, were dedicated to participants of October Revolution and the Great Patriotic War. The best of them are the monument to Nariman Narimanov, installed in Baku (1972), the memorial to fallen soldiers in Barda city (1979) and the monument to General Hazi Aslanov, installed in Lankaran – motherland of the twice Hero of Soviet Union, in 1984.

Jalal Garyaghdi died in 2001 and was buried in the Alley of Honor, in Baku.

== Awards ==
- Honored Art Worker of the Azerbaijan SSR (1954)
- Order of the Red Banner of Labour (1959)
- People's Painter of the Azerbaijan SSR (1960)
