= Muslim Social Democratic Party =

1904–1920 political party in Azerbaijan

The Muslim Social Democratic Party, usually referred to as Hummet or Hummat (Azerbaijani: Hümmət, lit. 'Endeavor'), was a left-wing political party in the South Caucasus. In 1920, it merged with the Baku communist group Adalat (Azerbaijani: Ədalət 'Justice') to form the first Communist Party of Azerbaijan.

== "Old" Hummet (1904 – 1920) ==
At the end of 1904, the Baku committee of the Russian Social Democratic Party created the Hummet in order to attract Muslim workers. Prominent Hummet politicians included Mammed Amin Rasulzade (until 1913), Meshadi Azizbekov, Prokopius Dzhaparidze, Sultan Medjid Efendiev, Zeynal Zeynalov and Nariman Narimanov. During the 1905 revolution, the support of the Hummet and the Armenian Hunchak party permitted the Bolsheviks to seize the leadership of the strike committee that oversaw the Baku oilfield strike.

A series of arrests in 1911 weakened the activities of the party, but after the February Revolution, the Hummet renewed its operations. From 1918 to 1920 the Hummet was represented in the parliament of the Azerbaijan Democratic Republic. On 20 February 1920, it merged with the Adalat Party, the Ahrar Party of Iran and Baku Bolsheviks to establish the Azerbaijan Communist Party.

Some sources report that pro-Bolshevik Muslims from the Hummet party participated in the March Events, massacres by the Bolshevik-led Baku Commune and Dashnak militias against Azerbaijanis in Baku, in a bid to suppress the Musavat party and to gain control of Baku. Other sources, on the contrary, report that Hummet party members were very critical of the conduct of the events. Sultan Majid Efendiyev, a member of the Hummet party, wrote:

The Dashnaks, who for handsome pay protected the capitalists, Taghiev, Naghiev, and others, massacred to a man, in the name of the Soviet, the population of entire blocks and sections inhabited by the Muslim poor. The Dashnaks under the command of such millionaires as Lalaiev and others, were now destroying not only the Musavatists but Muslims in general... The course of events led to a situation in which the comrades who stood at the head of the Soviet, Shaumyan, Japaridze, and others, became themselves prisoners of Dashnaks.
