= Mashadi Azizbeyov =

Soviet revolutionary (1876–1918)

- Məşədi Əzizbəyov
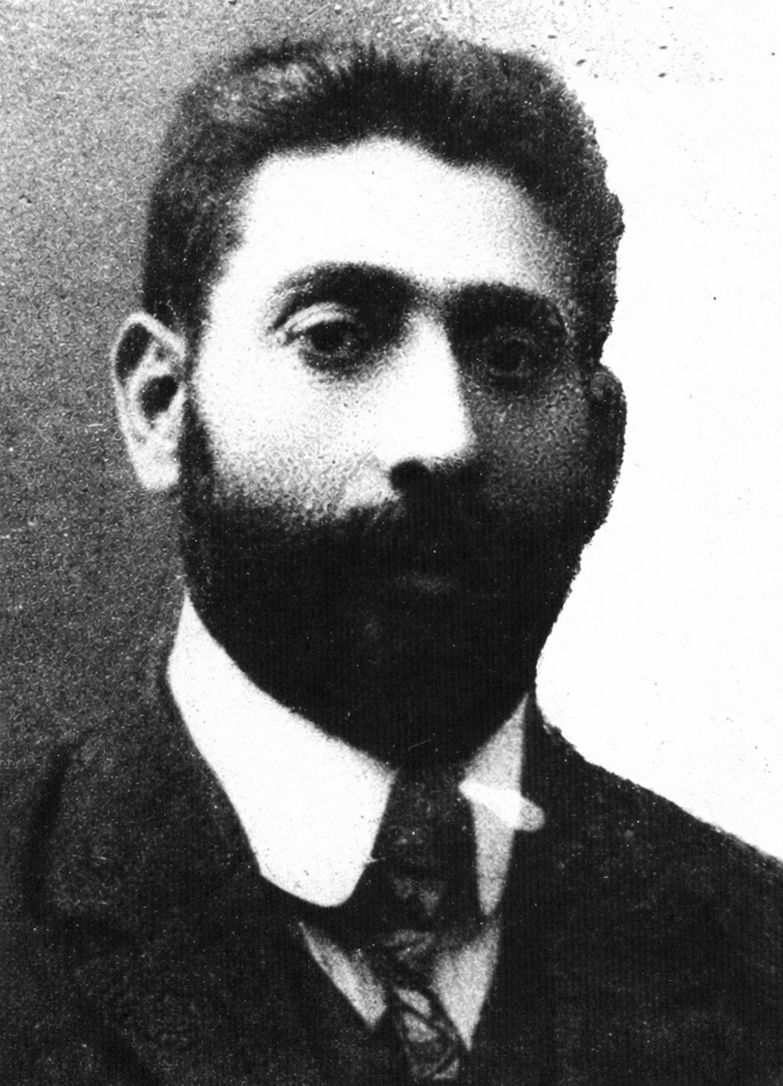
- Bolshevik revolutionary Mashadi Azizbeyov

Deputy People's Commissar of Internal Affairs of Caucasus

Personal details
- Born: January 6, 1876 Baku, Baku Governorate, Russian Empire
- Died: September 20, 1918 (aged 42) Krasnovodsk, Turkmenistan
- Party: Russian Social Democratic Labour Party (Bolsheviks); Hummet Party; Adalat Party
- Children: Azizagha Azizbeyov; Aslan Azizbeyov; Safura Azizbeyova; Beyimkhanum Azizbeyova
- Occupation: Politician, revolutionary

Mashadi Azizbey oghlu Azizbeyov, also spelled Azizbekov (Azerbaijani: Məşədi Əziz bəy oğlu Əzizbəyov; Russian: Мешади Азиз-бек оглы Азизбеков; January 6, 1876 – September 20, 1918) was a leader of the revolutionary movement in Azerbaijan, one of the first Azeri Marxists, Provincial Commissioner and Deputy People's Commissar of Internal Affairs, gubernial commissar for Baku. He was one of the 26 Baku Commissars.

Azizbeyov became a member of Russian Social Democratic Labour Party and a leader of the Muslim Social Democratic Party. After the October Revolution, he joined the Baku Commissars. As the Baku Commune was voted out of power in July 1918, Azizbeyov and the rest of the Commissars abandoned Baku and fled across the Caspian Sea. However, they were captured by anti-Soviet forces. On the night of September 20, Azizbeyov was executed by a firing squad in a remote location between the stations of Pereval and Akhcha-Kuyma on the Trans-Caspian railway.

Currently, views on Azizbeyov in Azerbaijan are mixed. Azerbaijani nationalists, the ruling New Azerbaijan Party, and the main opposition parties Musavat and APFP do not see Azizbeyov as a positive figure. Meanwhile, the Azerbaijan Communist Party and many other local left-wing politicians and sees Azizbeyov as a notable and positive figure in the history of Azerbaijan.

== Biography ==
=== Early life ===
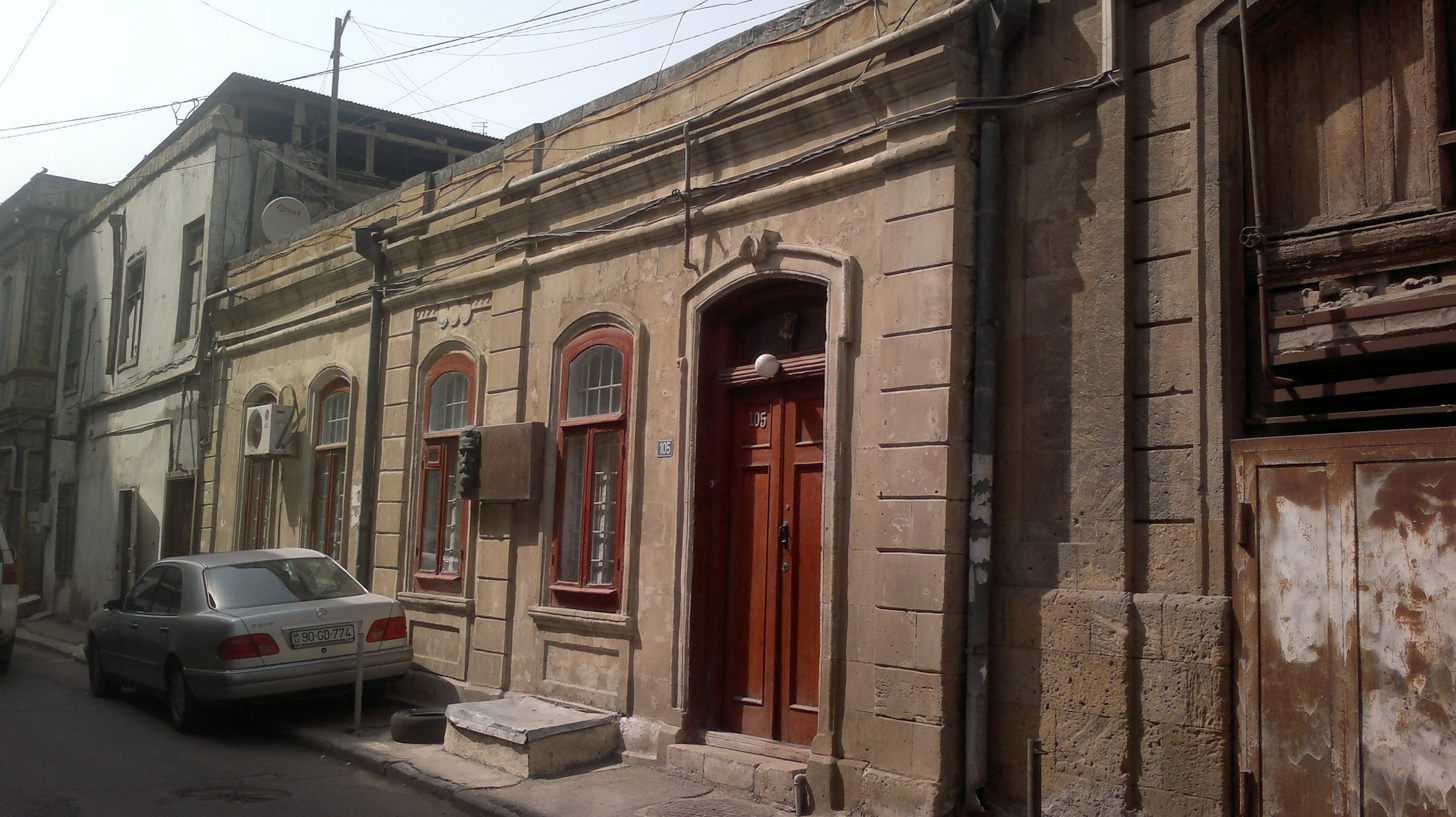
Building in Baku, where Azizbeyov was born

Soviet sources claimed that he was born into the family of bricklayers, but according to the Azizbeyov's grandson, he was born into a family of noblemen. Azizbeyov's father was close friends with Zeynalabdin Taghiyev, but he was executed during the rule of the Russian Empire.

Mashadi finished secondary school in Baku in 1896 and moved to St. Petersburg to enter civil engineering school. He joined the Russian Social Democratic Party in 1898 and took part in student movements. In 1899, he entered the St. Petersburg Technological Institute and graduated in as an electrical engineer. He was fluent in Russian and German.

=== Political and social activities ===
==== Russia and Iran ====
He took part in the protest of Saint Petersburg factory workers in 1902, for which he was persecuted, and in the Russian Revolution of 1905, as well as the famous "Mazut" constitution movement in Azerbaijan. He was an organizer of the Baku Oil Workers Union. During World War I, he helped many war refugees and wounded regardless of their nationality.

Azizbeyov was a member of the İctimaiyyun-amiyyun (Mujaheed) party in Iran. He was elected to the State Duma as a representative from Baku. During the Iranian revolution of 1908–10, he went to Iran and provided support in terms of literature and weaponry. In 1909, he was chosen as the head of the organization called "Help for the Iranian Revolution" in Baku. He was invited to Rasht and Anzali to participate in revolutionary activities. He personally knew Sattar Khan.

==== Azerbaijan ====
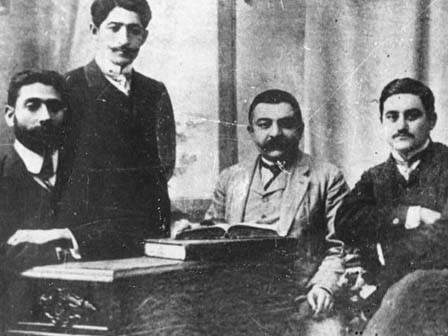
Azizbeyov, along with the other members of Hummet organization included Mammad Amin Rasulzade, who would later turn out to be a Musavatist.

He played a very active role in the establishment of the National Drama Theater of Azerbaijan (the Academy National Drama Theater was named after him for a short time) and also contributed to the construction of Shollar water in Baku, as a financial supporter and as an engineer. During his job in Elektrichiskaya Sila, he tried to stop the Azerbaijani-Armenian ethnic clashes. In 1906, he created the "druzhina" (paramilitary group) in Baku called Bayraği-nüsrət (Flag of the Glory). Then he played a role in the publishment of the Bolshevik papers called Devet-Qoch and Priziv. He became the co-head of the cultural-educative society of Nijat and opened a new place to help the poor population of Baku. In 1914 he participated and actively supported the protest of Baku industrial workers. Jalil Mammadguluzadeh gave the first publication of Molla Nasraddin to Azizbeyov for his contributions to education in Azerbaijan at that time.

==== Baku Commissars and Death ====
Funeral of the 26 Baku Commissars in 1920 (the crying woman is the mother of Mir Hasan Vezirov)

After the 1917 revolution, he was elected to the leadership of the Baku Commune. In March, he began participating in Hummet organizations. In April, he became a member of the bureau of the Muslim Social Democratic Party in Baku. He continued these activities for the rest of the year. He was one of the 26 Commissars of the Baku Commune that was established in the city after the October Revolution. According to the Azizbeyov's grandson, during the March Days Azizbeyov was in charge of the Shamakhi district and he saved the large part of population from the mass killings by Dashnaks, as he believed the poor village population can not be dangerous to the revolution.

Azizbeyov was friends with Mammad Amin Rasulzade in the early 1900s when he was also a member of the Hummet organization. When the Commune was toppled by the Centro Caspian Dictatorship, a British-backed coalition of Dashnaks, SRs and Mensheviks, Azizbeyov and his comrades were captured by British troops and executed by firing squad between the stations of Pereval and Akhcha-Kuyma of the Transcaucasian Railroad.

Azizbeyov, along with other Baku Comissars were buried in a huge ceremony in the center of Baku. In January 2009, the Baku authorities began the demolition of the city's 26 Commissars Memorial. The monument itself had been fenced-off since July 2008. The remains of the commissars were reburied at Hovsan Cemetery on 26 January 2009, with participation of Muslim, Jewish and Christian clergy who conducted religious ceremonies.

The dismantling was opposed by some local left-wingers and by the Azerbaijan Communist Party. During the reburial, no information was given to Azizbeyov's relatives, who wanted Azizbeyov to be reburied in the graveyard of Suvelan next to the grave of his mother. Currently, it is impossible to recognize which grave belongs to Mashadi Azizbeyov in the graveyard.

=== Personal life ===
Mashadi was married to the daughter of millionaire Zarbaliyev. He had four children; Aslan, Beyimkhanum, Safura and Aziz, who later became a major-general of the Soviet intendant service. His granddaughter Pustekhanum wrote a number of books about him. His wife Khanum Azizbeyova became the chairman of the first women club in 1919 organized by the oil magnate Shamsi Asadullayev. She was also active in the notable women's magazine Şərq qadını (Woman of the East). The grandson of his uncle's son Janibek Azizbeyov was killed during the First Nagorno-Karabakh War.

== Legacy ==
In the Soviet Union, Azizbeyov was portrayed as one of the fallen heroes of the Russian Revolution. The first historical novella in Azerbaijani literature, Komissar, by writer Mehdi Huseyn, features Azizbeyov as the main character. In cinema, he was portrayed in 26 Commissars (Russian: Двадцать шесть комиссаров, 1933), Morning (Azerbaijani: Səhər, 1960, by Azeri actor Nodar Şaşıqoğlu), an adaptation of Komissar, and 26 Baku Commissars! (Russian: Двадцать шесть бакинских комиссаров, 1966, by Azeri actor Məlik Dadaşov). He, along with the other Baku Commissars, was the subject of many films, documentaries, novels and poems of the Soviet Union, notably the 26-lar by Samad Vurgun, the novels Fighting City and Mysterious Baku by Mammad Said Ordubadi, as well as works by Nikolai Tikhonov, Nairi Zarian, Suleyman Rustam, Yeghishe Charents, Mikayil Mushfig, Vasily Kamensky, Paolo Iashvili, Semyon Kirsanov, Mirvarid Dilbazi, and Sergey Yesenin.

The towns of Vayk, Aregnadem and Zarritap, all in Armenia, were officially named Azizbeyov during the Soviet era. Busts of him in a metro station in Georgia, one of the central parks of Armenia, and a metro station in Azerbaijan were removed in the last decades. Khazar raion was officially called Azizbeyov until 2010. A street named after him in Turkmenistan was changed in recent years as well.

However, an avenue, a street in Baku, villages in the Goygol and Goranboy regions of Azerbaijan, and a city in the Nakhichevan Autonomous Republic are still officially called Azizbeyov. There are streets named after him in Kazakhstan (Almaty, Taraz), Russia (Volgograd, Astrakhan), Tajikistan (Dushanbe), Ukraine (Kryvyi Rih, Donetsk), and Uzbekistan (Jizzakh). There is also an alleyway in Magaramkent (Dagestan) named after him.
