= Yakov Zevin =

Russian politician (1888–1918)

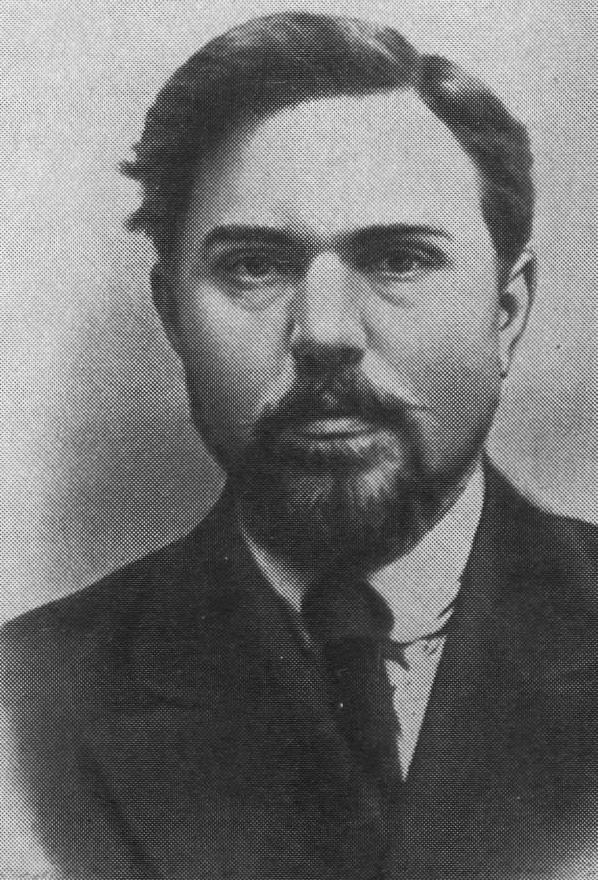
Yakov Zevin in the 1910s

Yakov Davidovich Zevin (Russian: Я́ков Дави́дович Зе́вин; 1888–1918) was a Russian revolutionary activist and one of the Bolshevik Party leaders in Azerbaijan during the Russian Revolution. Zevin was born in Krasnapolle, a town in present-day Mahilyow Voblast, Belarus. He became a member of Russian Social Democratic Labour Party in 1904 and was arrested several times for conducting revolutionary activities.

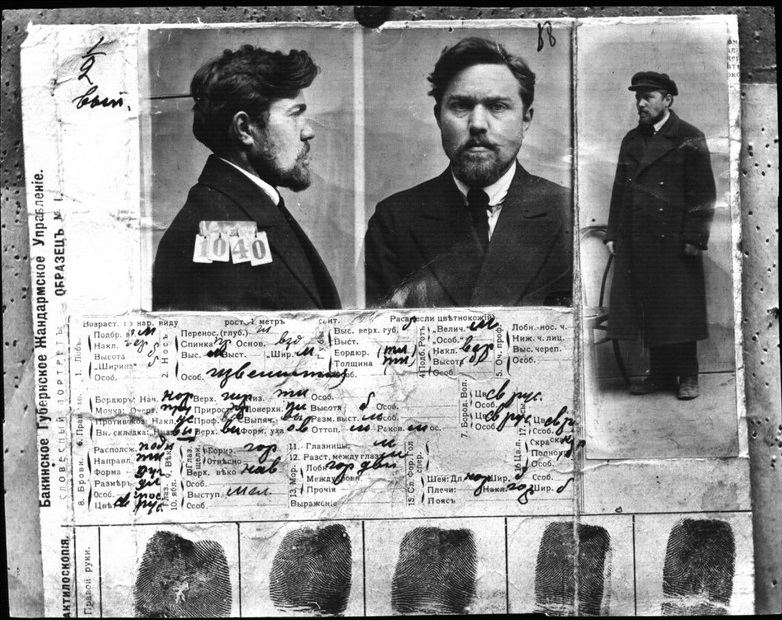
Mugshot of Yakov Zevin

He was a delegate in the 6th (Prague) conference of the Russian Social Democratic Labour Party in 1912, where he represented the group of Mensheviks. After the conference he became close to the Bolshevik positions. In 1915 he was a member of the Baku committee of Bolsheviks. After the February Revolution of 1917 he worked in the Moscow council of working deputies. Zevin became one of the 26 Baku Commissars (he was the Commissar of Labor) of the Soviet Commune that was established in the city after the October Revolution.

Funeral of 26 Baku Commissars in 1920 (crying woman is the mother of Mir Hasan Vezirov).

When the Commune was toppled by the Centro Caspian Dictatorship, a British-backed coalition of Dashnaks, SRs and Mensheviks, Zevin and his comrades were captured by British troops and executed by a firing squad between the stations of Pereval and Akhcha-Kuyma of Transcaucasian Railroad on September 20, 1918.
