= Meyer Basin =

Belarusian Caucasian Army member

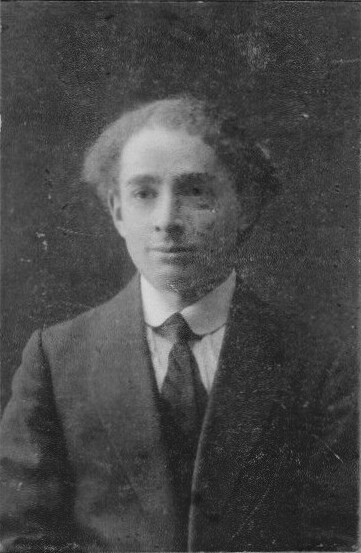
- Basin in 1918

Personal details
- Born: Meyer Velkovich Basin; 8 June 1890 Cherykaw, Mogilev Governorate, Russian Empire (now Belarus)
- Died: 20 September 1918 (aged 28) Krasnovodsk, Transcaspian Government (now Türkmenbaşy, Turkmenistan)
- Party: Communist Party of the Soviet Union
- Occupation: Politician, revolutionary

Meyer Velkovich Basin (8 June 1890 – 20 September 1918) was a member of the Military Revolutionary Committee of the Caucasian Army.

In 1909, he graduated from a local school in Mogilev, and soon after, in 1912 joined the newly formed Communist Party of the Soviet Union. After moving to Baku, he became a prominent organizer of strikes in 1914.

He was one of the 26 Baku Commissars who were Bolshevik and Left Socialist-Revolutionaries members of the Baku Soviet Commune that was established in the city of Baku after the October Revolution. The commune was led by Stepan Shahumyan until 26 July 1918 when the Bolsheviks were forced out of power by a coalition of Dashnaks, Right Socialist-Revolutionaries and Mensheviks. After their ouster, the Baku commissars attempted to escape but were captured by the White Army and placed in a Baku prison. On 14 September Red Army soldiers broke into the prison and freed the commissars who then boarded a ship to Krasnovodsk, where they were promptly arrested, and on the night of 20 September 1918 executed by a firing squad between the stations of Pereval and Akhcha-Kuyma of the Transcaspian Railway.

On 28 August 1918, while under arrest, he was elected to the council of Baku as a representative of the Bolshevik party.

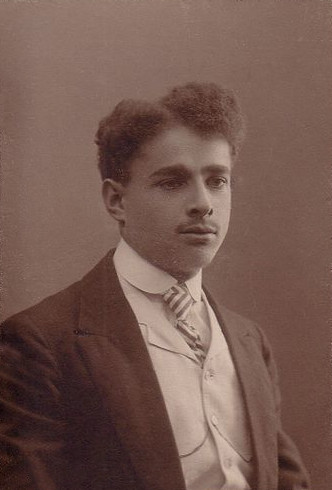
Meyer Basin, 1913

Funeral of 26 Baku Commissars in 1920 (the crying woman is the mother of Mir Hasan Vezirov).
