= Grigory Petrov (revolutionary) =

Russian politician (1892–1918)

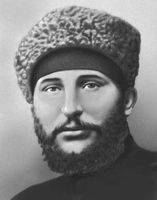
Grigory Petrov

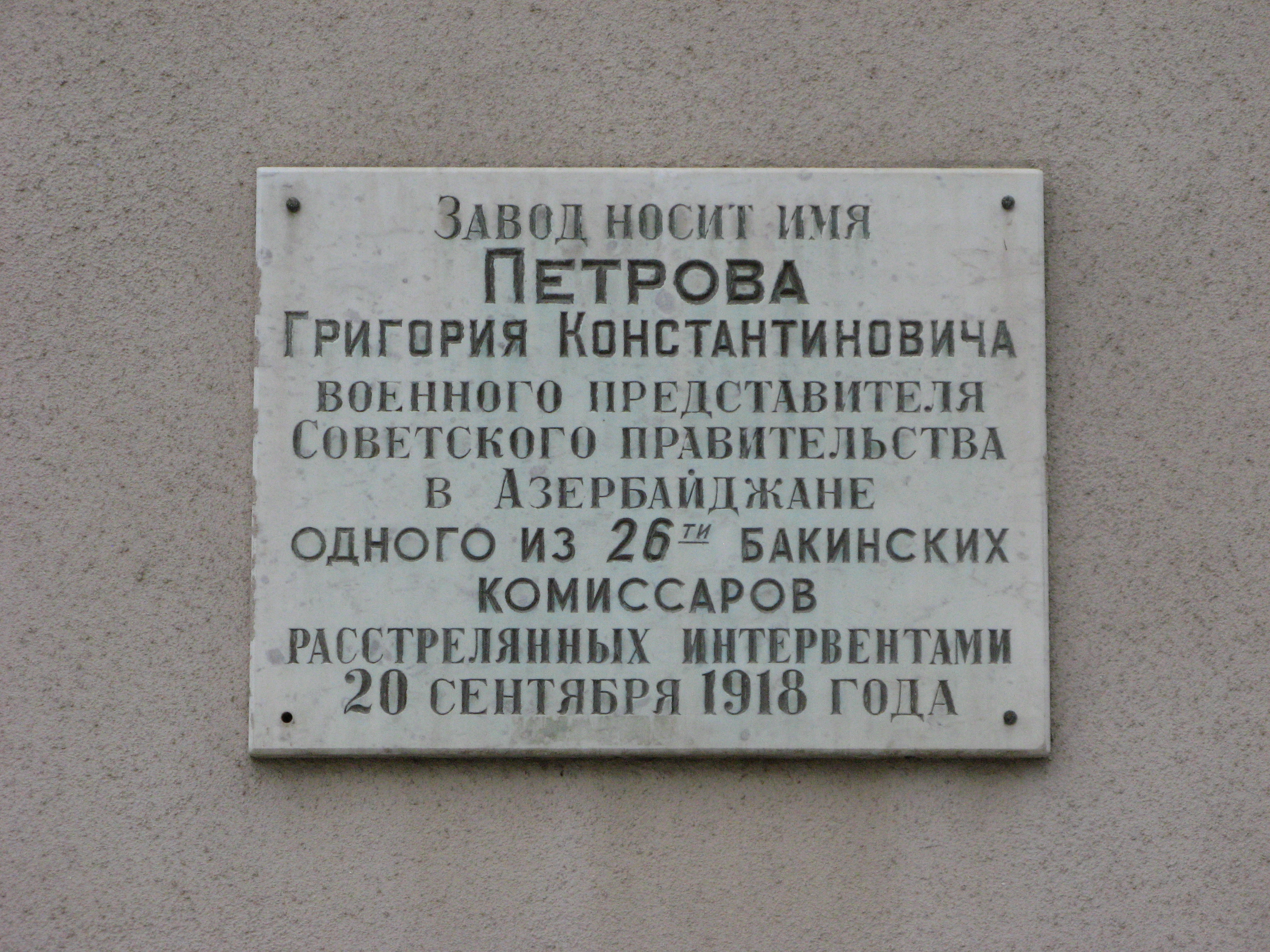
Memorial plaque at the Petrov Plant in Volgograd, named in honor of Grigory Konstantinovich Petrov.

Funeral of 26 Baku Commissars in 1920 (the crying woman is Mir Hasan Vezirov's mother).

Grigory Constantinovich Petrov (Russian: Григорий Константинович Петров) (1892-20 September 1918) was a Russian Left Socialist-Revolutionary activist in Baku, Azerbaijan, during the Russian Civil War. Petrov became one of the 26 Baku Commissars of the Soviet Commune that was established in the city after the October Revolution. He was the Military Commissar of the Baku region. When the Commune was toppled by the Centro Caspian Dictatorship, a British-backed coalition of Dashnaks, SRs and Mensheviks, Petrov and his comrades were captured by British troops and executed by a firing squad between the stations of Pereval and Akhcha-Kuyma of Transcaucasian Railroad on the night of 20 September 1918.
