= March Days =

1918 inter-ethnic clashes and Bolshevik takeover attempt in Baku

- Part of the Armenian-Azerbaijani War
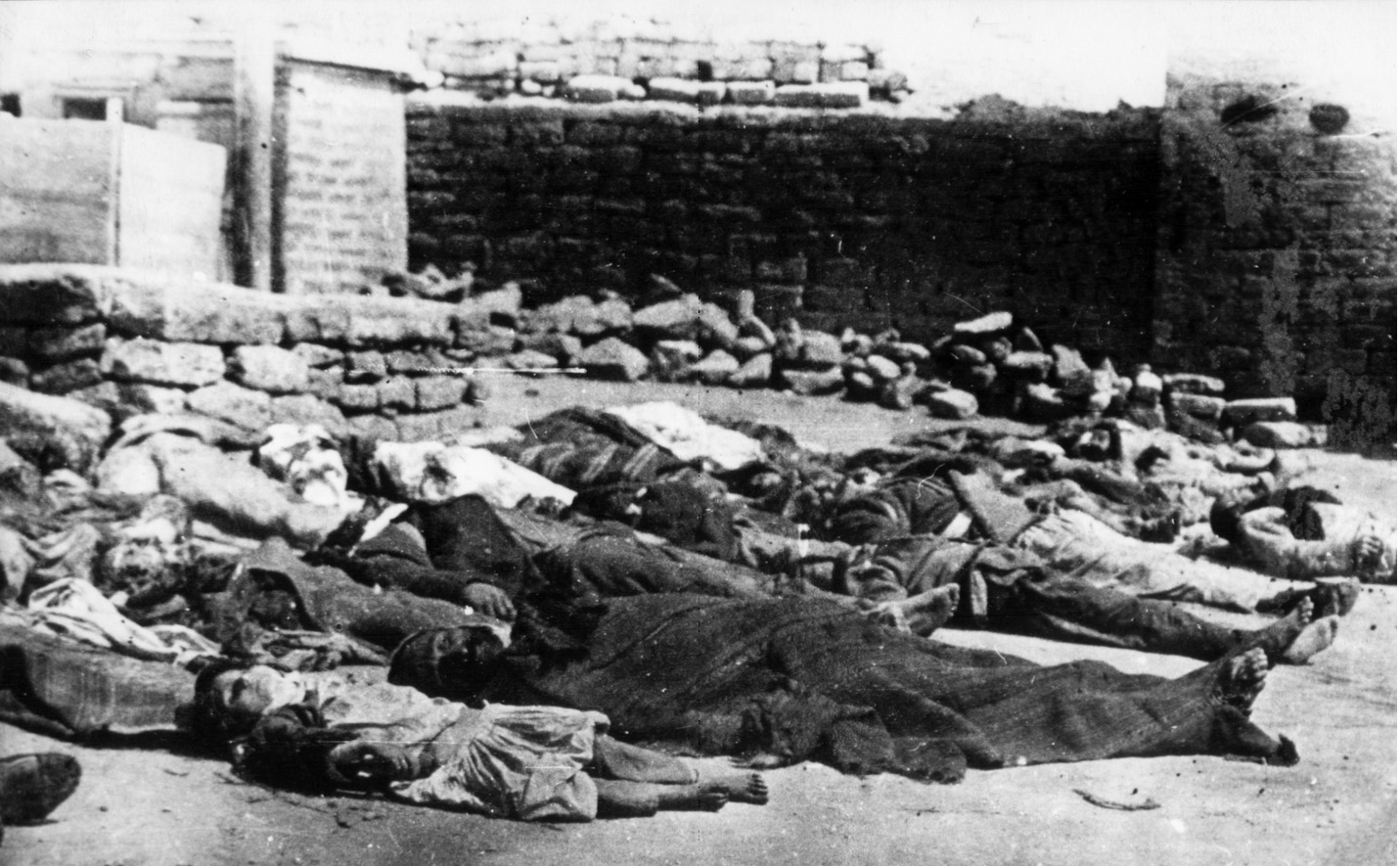
- Azerbaijani victims in Baku
Date	30 March – 2 April 1918
Location	Baku Governorate, Transcaucasian Commissariat
Result	Bolshevik and Dashnaktsutyun victory: Musavat lost control in Baku; Baku Commune was established in April 1918

Belligerents
Bolsheviks; Armenian Revolutionary Federation	Musavat Party

Commanders and leaders
Stepan Shahumyan	Mahammad Amin Rasulzade

Strength
Bolsheviks; 6,000 regular troops, Russian Fleet gunboats Dashnaks; 4,000 militiamen	10,000 troops and militiamen

Casualties and losses
- See § Death toll

The March Days or March Events (Azerbaijani: Mart hadisələri) was a period of inter-ethnic strife and clashes which took place between 30 March – 2 April 1918 in the city of Baku and adjacent areas of the Baku Governorate of the Transcaucasian Commissariat.

Facilitated by a political power struggle between Bolsheviks with the support of the Armenian Revolutionary Federation on one side and the Azerbaijani Musavat Party on another, the events led to rumours of a possible Muslim revolt on the part of Bolshevik and Dashnak forces and the establishment of the short-lived Baku Commune in April 1918.

The majority of historic sources and accounts interpret the March Days in the context of civil war unrest. The clashes resulted in "interethnic bloodletting", according to Ronald Grigor Suny, with massacres and atrocities being committed by both sides.

== Background ==
=== Political situation ===
Following the February Revolution, a Special Transcaucasian Committee, including Armenian, Azerbaijani and Georgian representatives, was established to administer parts of the South Caucasus under the control of the Russian Provisional Government. After the October Revolution, on 11 November 1917, this committee was replaced by the Transcaucasian Commissariat, also known as the Sejm, with headquarters in Tbilisi. The Sejm opposed Bolshevism and sought separation of the South Caucasus from Bolshevik Russia. To prevent that, on 13 November 1917, a group of Bolsheviks and Left Socialist-Revolutionaries (SR) proclaimed the Baku Soviet, a governing body which assumed power over the territory of Baku Governorate under the leadership of Bolshevik Stepan Shahumyan. Although the Baku Soviet included Azerbaijanis and Armenians who were neither Bolsheviks nor necessarily sympathetic towards Bolshevik ideas, the two nationalist parties and members of the Sejm ― the Musavat and Armenian Revolutionary Federation ― refused to recognize its authority. The Baku-based Musavat dominated the Muslim National Councils (MNCs), a representative body which eventually formed the first Parliament of the Azerbaijan Democratic Republic (ADR). Mammad Hasan Hajinski chaired the Temporary Executive Committee for the MNCs, while Mammed Amin Rasulzade, Alimardan Topchubashev, Fatali Khan Khoyski and other prominent political figures were among the 44 Azerbaijani delegates to the Sejm. Meanwhile, the ARF, which was established in Tbilisi, formed a 27-member Armenian delegation to the Sejm. The leader of the Baku Soviet, Shahumyan, kept contacts with ARF and viewed it as a source of support for eliminating Musavat influence in Baku.

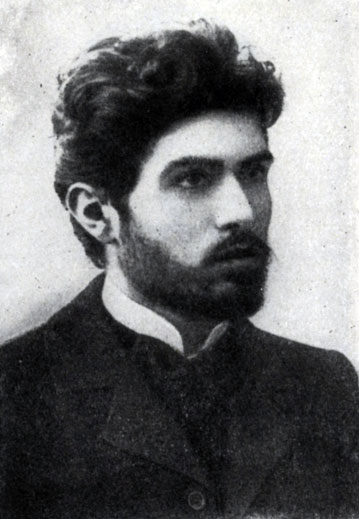
Stepan Shahumyan, an ethnic Armenian leader of the Bolshevik Baku Soviet

After the October Revolution, the Russian army fell apart and its units fled the front lines en masse, often harassing local residents. Concerned with the situation, the Sejm established a Military Council of Nationalities, with Armenian, Azerbaijani and Georgian representatives, which had troops at its disposal. When a large group of Russian soldiers withdrew from the Ottoman front line in January 1918, the head of the council, Georgian Menshevik Noe Ramishvili, ordered their disarmament. The Russian soldiers were stopped near Shamkhor station and, upon a refusal to surrender, were attacked by Azerbaijani bands in what became known as the Shamkhor massacre. The Baku Soviet played out this incident into its favor against the Sejm. (Note: Here is what Bakinsky Rabochy reports about it: In the first half of January 1918, on the railway line between Tbilisi and Yelizavetpol, armed bands of Moslems many thousand strong, headed by members of the Yelizavetpol Moslem National Committee and with the support of an armoured train sent by the Transcaucasian Commissariat, forcibly disarmed a number of military units leaving for Russia. Thousands of Russian soldiers were killed or mutilated; the railway line was strewn with their corpses. They were deprived of about 15,000 rifles, some 70 machine guns and a score of artillery pieces. — Joseph Stalin (26–27 March 1918). "Transcaucasian Counter-revolutionaries Under a Socialist Mask". Marxists Internet Archive.)

On 10–24 February 1918, the Sejm adopted a declaration of independence. In the meantime, to support Armenian resistance against the Ottoman Empire, the British government attempted to re-organize and train a group of Armenians from the Caucasus under the leadership of General Lionel Dunsterville in Baghdad. The Allies had also provided Armenians with 6,500,000 rubles ($3,250,000 of 1918 value) in financial assistance. In addition, the Armenian National Organization of the Caucasus formed an Armenian Military Committee in Petrograd under General Bagradouni and called upon all Armenian military personnel scattered throughout Russia to mobilize on the Caucasus front. In response to this call, by early March 1918, a large number of Armenians had gathered in Baku, joining a group of 200 trained officers accompanied by General Bagradouni and the ARF co-founder Stepan Zorian (Mr. Rostom).

The Azerbaijanis grew increasingly suspicious that Shahumyan, who was an ethnic Armenian, was conspiring with the Dashnaks against them. The units of the Caucasian Native Cavalry Division, composed of Caucasian Muslims who had served in the Imperial Russian Army, thus nicknamed the "Savage" Division, disarmed a pro-Bolshevik garrison in Lankaran, and Dagestani insurgents under imam Najmuddin of Gotzo drove the Bolsheviks out of Petrovsk, severing Baku's land communications with Bolshevik Russia. The Armistice of Erzincan, followed by the Treaty of Brest-Litovsk signed on 3 March 1918, formalized Russia's exit from World War I. According to Richard G. Hovannisian, a secret annex to the Treaty of Brest-Litovsk obligated the Bolsheviks to demobilize and dissolve ethnic Armenian bands on territories previously under Russian control. At the subsequent Trabzon Peace Conference, the Ottoman delegation called for a unified position of the Sejm before the negotiations could be completed. The Bolsheviks grew increasingly concerned about the emerging Transcaucasian Federation, and in the given situation, had to choose between Musavat and ARF in the struggle to dominate Transcaucasia's largest city. Thus the Baku Soviet was drawn into the nationalistic struggle between the Azerbaijanis and the Armenians, trying to utilize one people against the other.

As Baku produced 7 million tons of oil per year (about 15% of global oil production), during World War I the city remained in the sights of the major warring powers. Even though most of the oil fields were owned by Azerbaijanis and less than 5 per cent by Armenians, most of the production/distribution rights in Baku were owned by foreign investors, primarily the British. At the beginning of 1918, Germany transferred General Friedrich Freiherr Kress von Kressenstein from the Sinai and Palestine Campaign to establish the German Caucasus Expedition with the aim of capturing Baku. In response, in February 1918, the British dispatched General Lionel Dunsterville with troops to Baku through Enzeli, in order to block the German move and to protect the British investments.

=== Demographics and armed groups ===
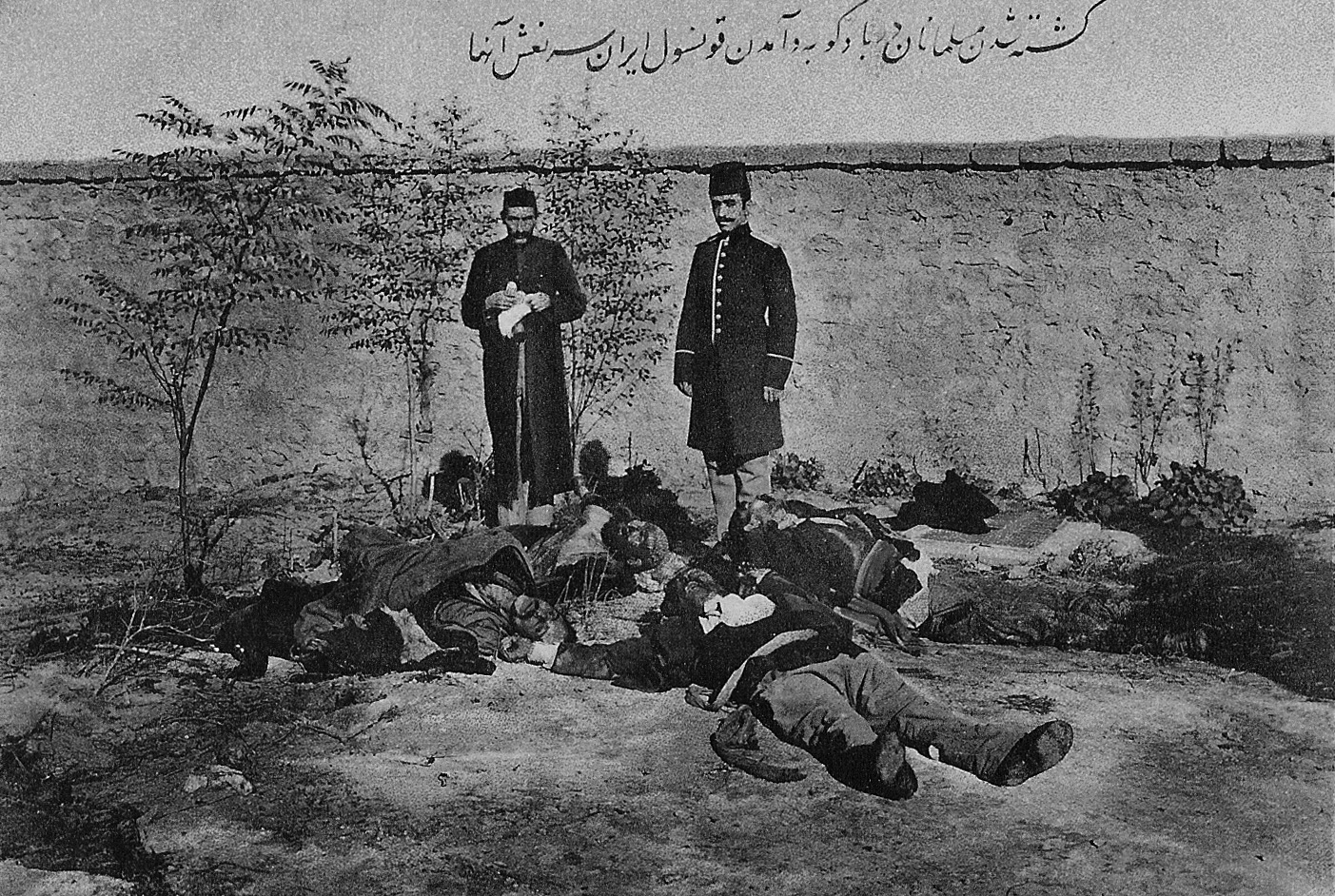
Postcard from Iran. Iranian consul M.S. Vezare-Maragai near Muslim victims in Baku after March days

Before World War I, the population of Baku, including the Bailoff promontory, the White Town, the oil fields and the neighboring villages, amounted to over 200,000, distributed as follows: 74,000 temporary migrants from various parts of Russia, 56,000 Azerbaijani natives of the town and district, 25,000 Armenians, 18,000 Persians, 6,000 Jews, 4,000 Volga Tatars, 3,800 Lezgins, 2,600 Georgians, 5,000 Germans, 1,500 Poles and many other nationalities numbering less than 1,000 each. Azerbaijanis formed the majority among natives and owned the greater part of land including the oil fields. They also constituted most of the labor force and small trading class as well as some commercial and financial posts. The petroleum industry was largely owned by a small number of foreign capitalists.

Prior to the 1918 March events, the major armed groups in Baku consisted of 6,000 men from the remnants of the Russian Caucasus Army which had withdrawn from the Ottoman front line, about 4,000 men of the Armenian militia organized under the ARF Dashnaktsutiun, and an undefined number of soldiers of the Caucasian Native Cavalry Division disbanded in January 1918.

== Events of 30 March – 2 April 1918 ==
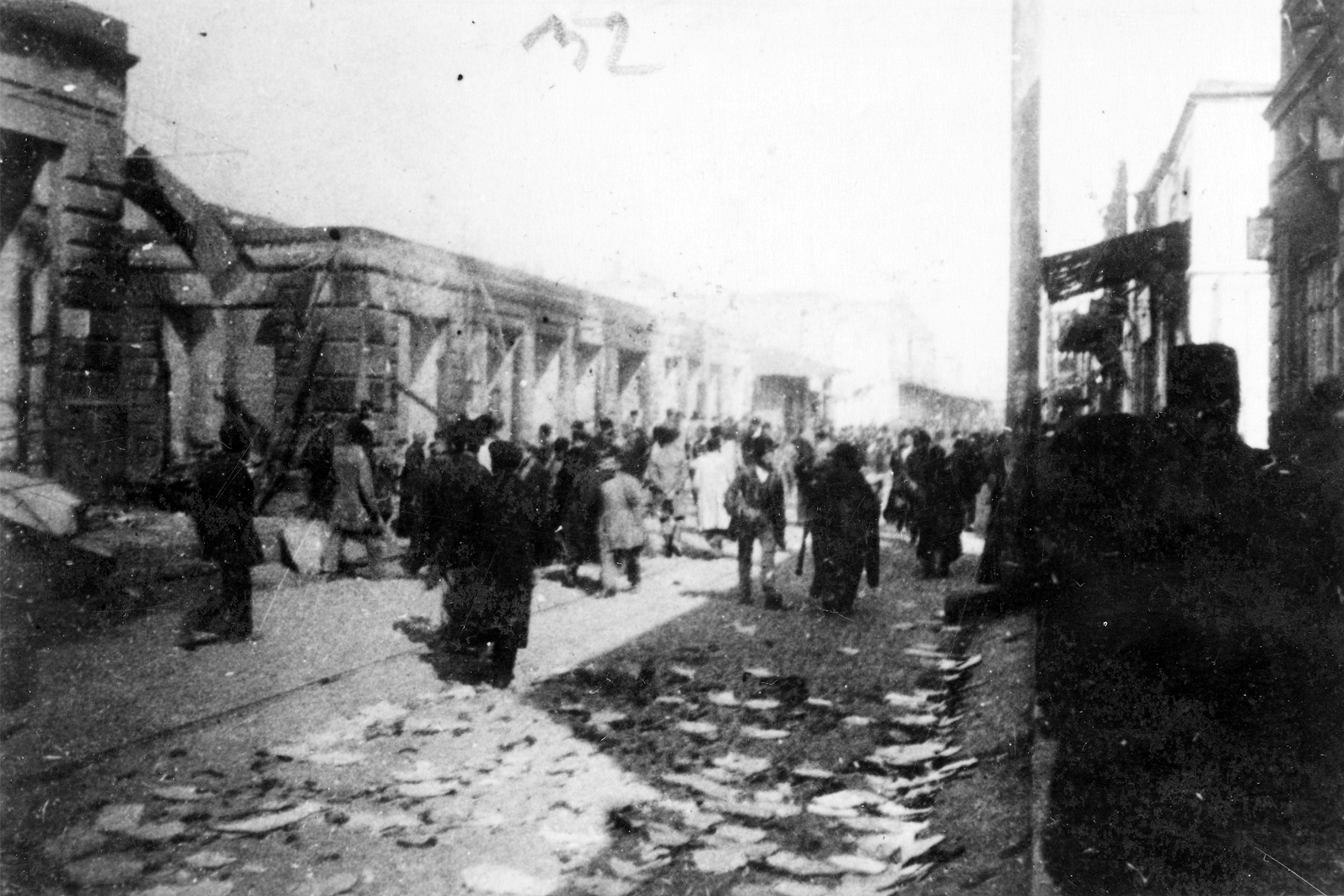
Bazarnaya Street (modern day Azerbaijan Avenue) during the March days in 1918

When the staff of the disbanded Caucasian Native Cavalry Division arrived in Baku on 9 March 1918, the Soviet immediately arrested its commander, General Talyshinski. The move sparked protests from the Azerbaijani population, with occasional calls to offer armed resistance to the Soviet. According to the historian Firuz Kazemzadeh, Shahumyan could have prevented bloodshed, had he been less impulsive and stubborn. Only a few days earlier, Shahumyan had received a telegram from Lenin, in which he was advised "to learn diplomacy", but this advice was ignored. (Note: Dear Comrade Shahumyan: Many thanks for the letter. We are delighted by your firm and decisive policy; do unite with it a most cautious diplomacy, which is doubtlessly made necessary by the present most difficult situation, and we shall win. The difficulties are unfathomable; up to now we have been saved by the contradictions and conflicts and the struggle among imperialists. Be able to use these conflicts; now it is necessary to learn diplomacy. Best wishes and greetings to all the friends. — V. Ulyanov (Lenin), Stepan Shahumyan, Статьи и речи, Bakinskii Rabochii, Articles and speeches of the Bolshevik Extraordinary Commissar for the Caucasus, 1924, p. 224)

The March 1918 confrontation was triggered by an incident with the steamship Evelina. On 27 March 1918, fifty former Caucasian Native Cavalry Division servicemen arrived in Baku on this ship to attend the funeral of their colleague Mamed Tagiyev, son of a famous Azerbaijani oil magnate and philanthropist, Haji Zeynalabdin Taghiyev. M. Tagiyev had been killed in a skirmish by Russian-Armenian forces in Lankaran. When the soldiers got back on board the Evelina to sail out of Baku on 30 March 1918, the Soviet received information that the Muslim crew of the ship was armed and waiting for a signal to revolt against the Soviet. While the report lacked foundation, the Soviet acted on it, disarming the crew which tried to resist. Other sources claim that (Note: Peter Hopkirk: alarmed by the growing military strength of the Armenians, to which British support had undoubtedly contributed, the Baku Muslims had secretly sought help from their co-religionists elsewhere. Among those who responded were units of the all-Muslim Savage Division, which had until the Revolution formed part of the Tsarist forces. Flush with their success in overthrowing the Bolshevik garrison at the Caspian port of Lenkoran, some detachments now set sail for Baku. Their arrival, on March 30, caused great consternation among both Bolsheviks and Armenians. When officials were sent down to the dockside to try to discover what their intentions were, they were driven back by gunfire, a number of them being killed. Eventually the newcomers were disarmed by a stronger Bolshevik force, but when more units of the Savage Division arrived on April 1, in MacDonell's words, "the Baku cauldron boiled over". No one really knows who fired the first shot, but very soon it had become a battlefield, with trenches and barricades being hastily prepared everywhere. — Peter Hopkirk, Claims of the Peace Delegation of the Republic of Caucasian Azerbaijan presented to the Peace Conference in Paris, Paris, 1919, pp. 18–19.) Azerbaijanis were alarmed by the growing military strength of the Armenians in Baku, and called for the help of the Caucasian Native Cavalry Division units in Lenkoran. Their arrival caused great concern among both Bolsheviks and Armenians, and when officials were sent down to the dockside to try to discover what their intentions were, they were driven back by gunfire, a number of them being killed. Eventually these newcomers were disarmed by a stronger Bolshevik force, but when more units of the Caucasian Native Cavalry Division arrived on 1 April, in MacDonell's words, "the Baku cauldron boiled over". No one really knows who fired the first shot, but very soon Baku became a battlefield, with trenches and barricades being hastily prepared throughout the city.

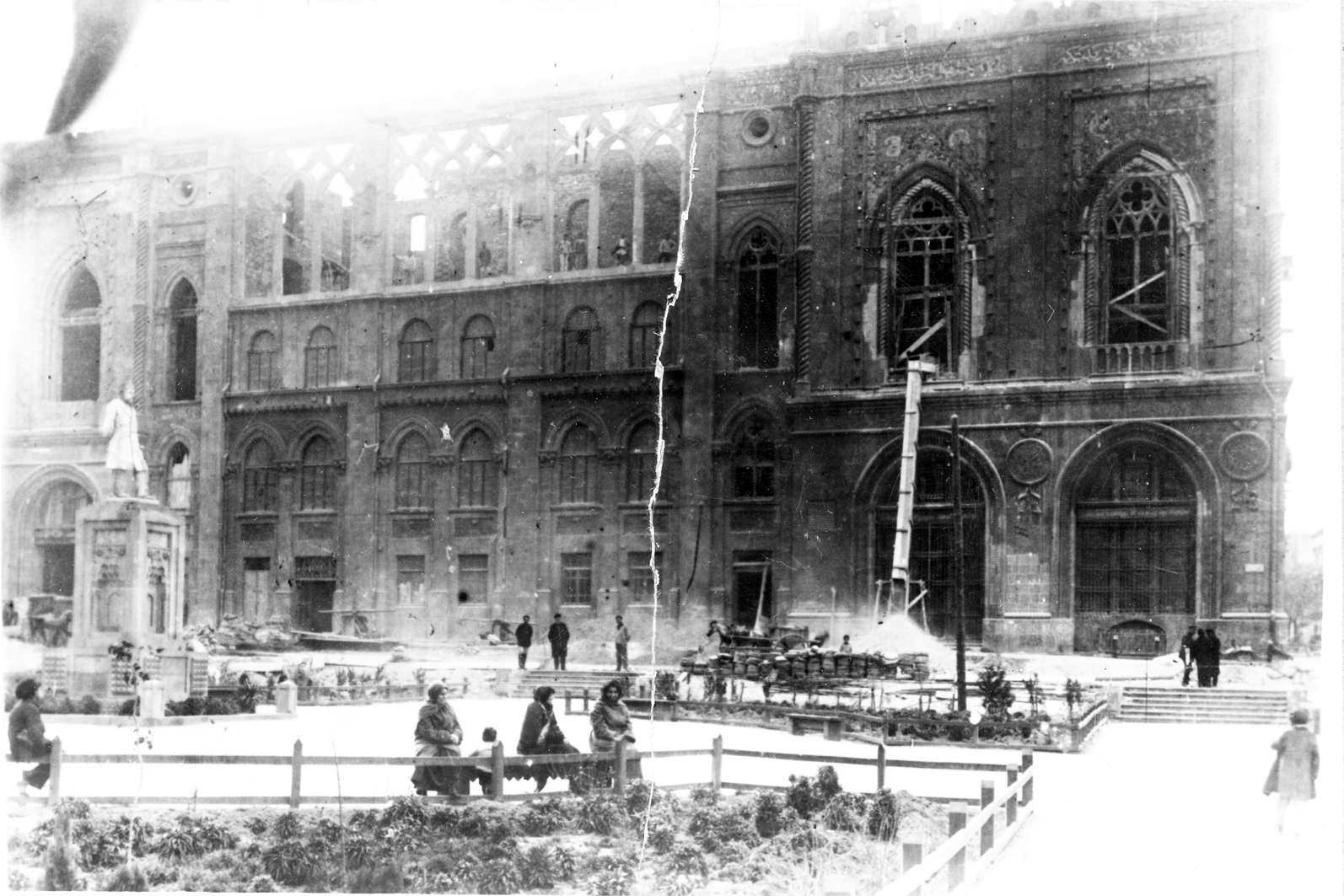
Ismailiyya building

By 6 p.m. on 30 March 1918, Baku was filled with fighting. The Soviet side, led by Shahumyan, realized that full civil war was starting and its own forces were insufficient against Azerbaijani masses led by Musavat. Allies were found among the Mensheviks, SRs, and the Kadets (right-wing liberals), which promised to support the Bolsheviks as the champions of the "Russian Cause." In response to these, Musavat's Achiq Söz newspaper noted that while Bolsheviks and Mensheviks were fighting all year, both were uniting against Musavat even with the Kadets and the Dashnaks. The paper attributed such alliance to national factors, and concluded that the Soviet's attempt to provoke "one nationality against another, instead of fighting a class war, was a tragic capitulation of democracy".

On the morning of 31 March, Azerbaijanis opposed to the Bolshevik disarming of the Caucasian Native Cavalry Division held protests in Baku, demanding to arm the Muslims. The Azerbaijani Bolshevik organization Hümmet attempted to mediate the dispute, proposing that the arms taken from the Caucasian Native Cavalry Division be transferred to the custody of the Hümmet. Shahumyan agreed to this proposal, but on the afternoon of 31 March, when Muslim representatives appeared before the Baku Soviet leadership to take the arms, shots were already being heard in the city and the Soviet commissar Prokofy Dzhaparidze refused to provide the arms. He informed the Hümmet leadership that "Musavat had launched a political war". The talks broke off abruptly when the Soviet's soldiers were fired upon. The Bolsheviks accused the Muslims of responsibility for the incident, stopped negotiations, and opened hostilities. Later Shahumyan admitted that the Bolsheviks deliberately used a pretext to attack their political opponents:

We needed to give a rebuff, and we exploited the opportunity of the first attempt at an armed assault on our cavalry unit and began an attack on the whole front. Due to the efforts of both the local Soviet and the Military-revolutionary committee of the Caucasus Army, which moved here (from Tbilisi and Sarikamish) we already had armed forces – about 6,000 strong. Dashnaktsutiun also had 3,000 – 4,000 strong national forces, which were at our disposal. The participation of the latter lent the civil war, to some extent, the character of an ethnic massacre, however, it was impossible to avoid it. We were going for it deliberately. The Muslim poor suffered severely, however they are now rallying around the Bolsheviks and the Soviet.

Armenians initially remained neutral as the Muslim rebellion against the Soviet began. The Musavat Party proposed an alliance with the Dashnaks, but was given a rebuff. The Armenian leadership withdrew its forces to the Armenian areas of Baku and limited its action to self-defense. On the evening of 31 March, machine-gun and rifle fire in Baku intensified into a full-fledged battle. On the morning of 1 April 1918, the Committee of Revolutionary Defense of Baku's Soviet issued a leaflet which said:

In view of the fact that the counterrevolutionary Musavat party declared war on the Soviet of Workers', Soldiers', and Sailors' Deputies in the city of Baku and thus threatened the existence of the government of the revolutionary democracy, Baku is declared to be in a state of siege

Forced to seek support from either Muslim Musavat or Armenian Dashnaktsutyun, Shahumyan, himself an Armenian, chose the latter. Following initial skirmishes in the streets, the Dashnaks proceeded to initiate a massacre, wildly killing Musavat military elements and Muslim civilians alike without mercy or discrimination in both Baku and the surrounding countryside.

There were descriptions of Dashnak forces taking to looting, burning and killing in the Muslim sections of the city. According to Peter Hopkirk, "Armenians, seeing that at last they had their ancient foes on the run, were now out for vengeance". In Balakhany and Ramany districts of Baku, the majority of Muslim workers stayed at their places and avoided the battles, while the peasants were not moved to join the anti-Soviet rebels. The Persian workers remained passive during all of the fighting, refusing to take sides. Left-wing Muslim leaders, including those of SRs and Hümmet Party, such as Narimanov, Azizbekov, Bunyat Sardarov and Kazi-Magomed Aghasiyev, supported the Soviet forces During the battles, Bolsheviks decided to use artillery against the Azerbaijani residential quarters in the city.

On the afternoon on 1 April, a Muslim delegation arrived at the Hotel Astoria. The Committee of Revolutionary Defense presented them with an ultimatum (Note: The contents of the ultimatum presented by the Bolsheviks and accepted by the Musavat: We demand the immediate end of the military activity opened against Soviet power in the city of Baku; we demand the immediate surrender of fortified posts and the destruction of trenches. In order to avoid repetition in the future of such acts, the Committee of Revolutionary Defense demands: 1. Open and unconditional recognition of the power of the Baku Soviet of Workers, Soldiers, and Sailors Deputies and the complete subordination to all its orders.; 2. The "Savage Division" as a counterrevolutionary military units cannot be tolerated with the bounds of Baku and its districts. Other national Moslem military units, as well as Armenian ones, should be either led out of the city or subordinated completely to the Soviet. Whole armed population must be under the control and check of the Soviet.; 3. We demand the acceptance of immediate measures to open the railroads from Baku to Tbilisi and from Baku to Petrovsk.; — (Suny 1972, pp. 217–221)) and demanded that representatives of all Muslim parties sign the document before the shelling stopped. Early in the evening, the agreements were signed and the bombardment stopped. The fighting did not subside, however, until the night of 2 April 1918, when thousands of Muslims started leaving the city in a mass exodus. By the fifth day, although much of the city was still ablaze, all resistance had ceased, leaving the streets strewn with dead and wounded, nearly all of them Muslims.

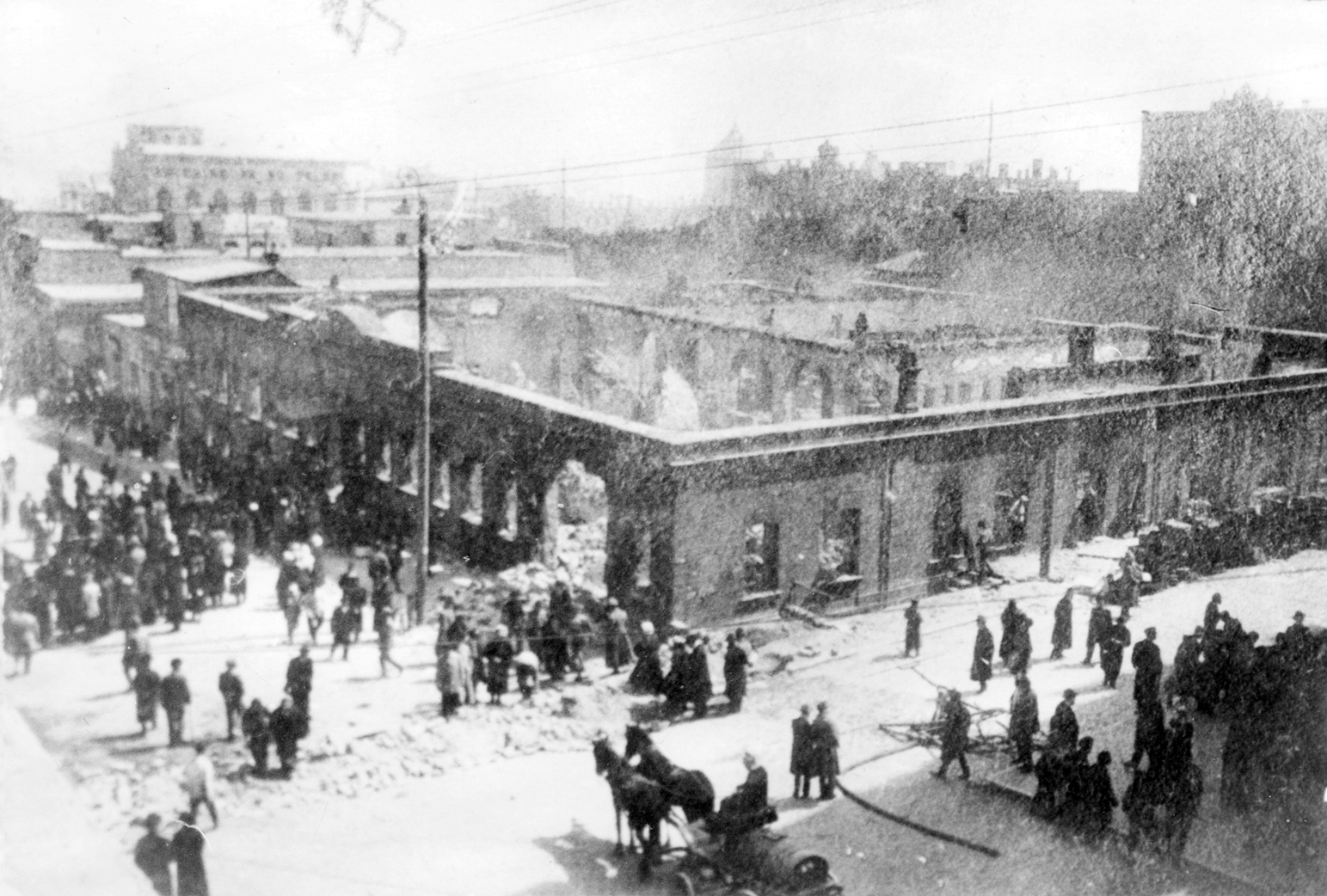
Ruins of the editorial office of the Kaspi newspaper on Nikolayevskaya Street (present-day Istiglaliyyat Street)

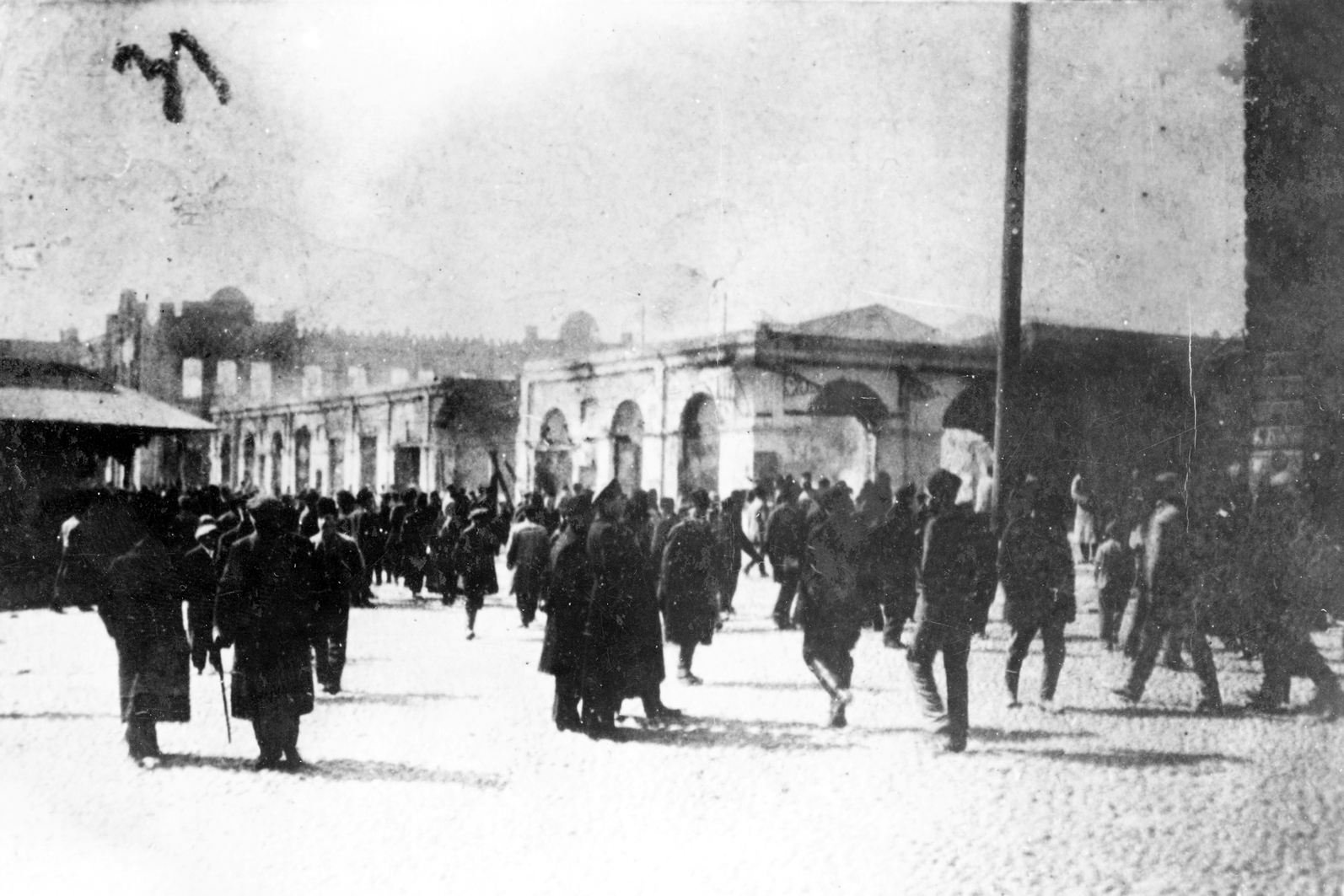
Gubernskaya Street (present-day Nizami Street)

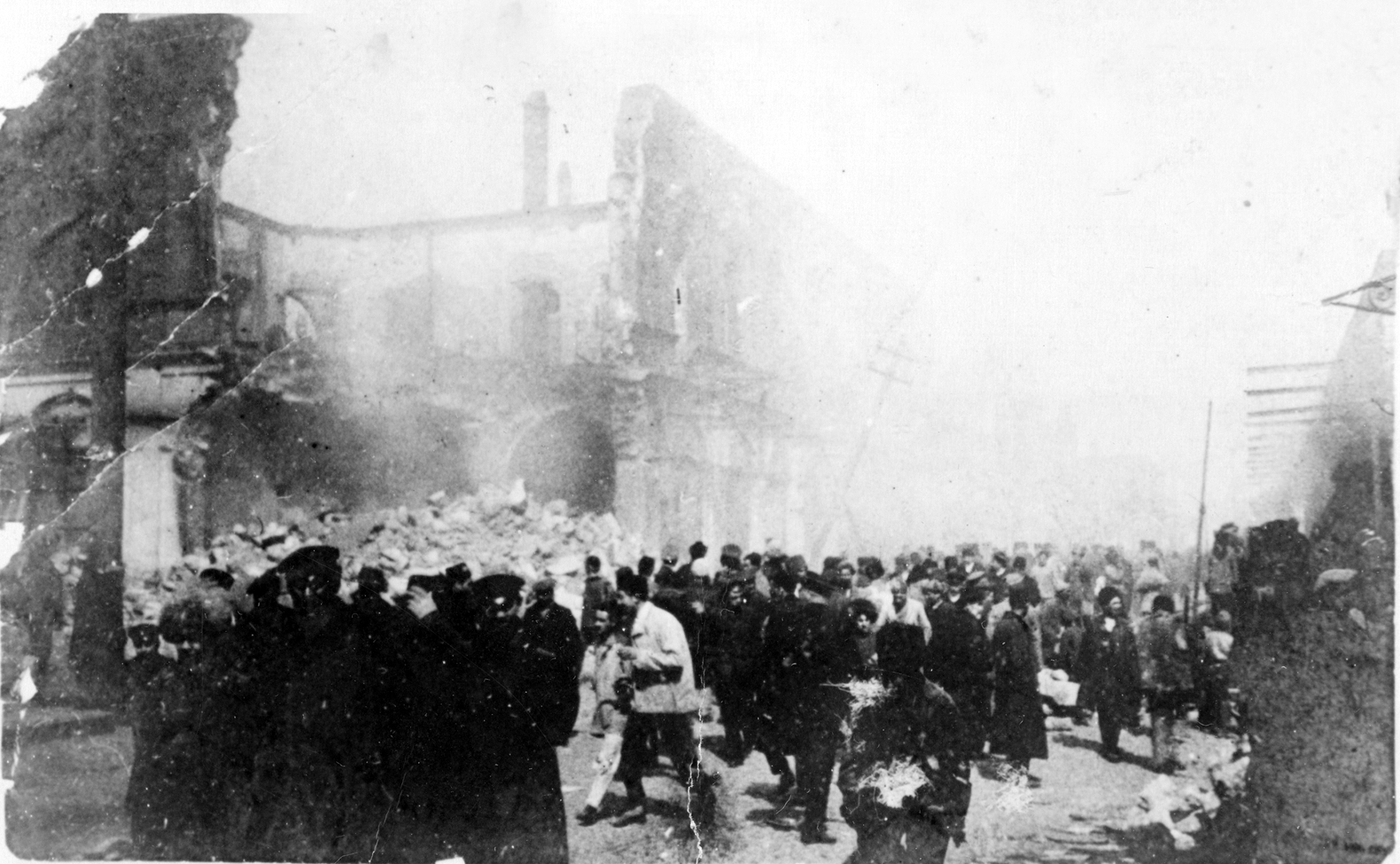
Bazarnaya Street (present-day Azerbaijan Avenue)

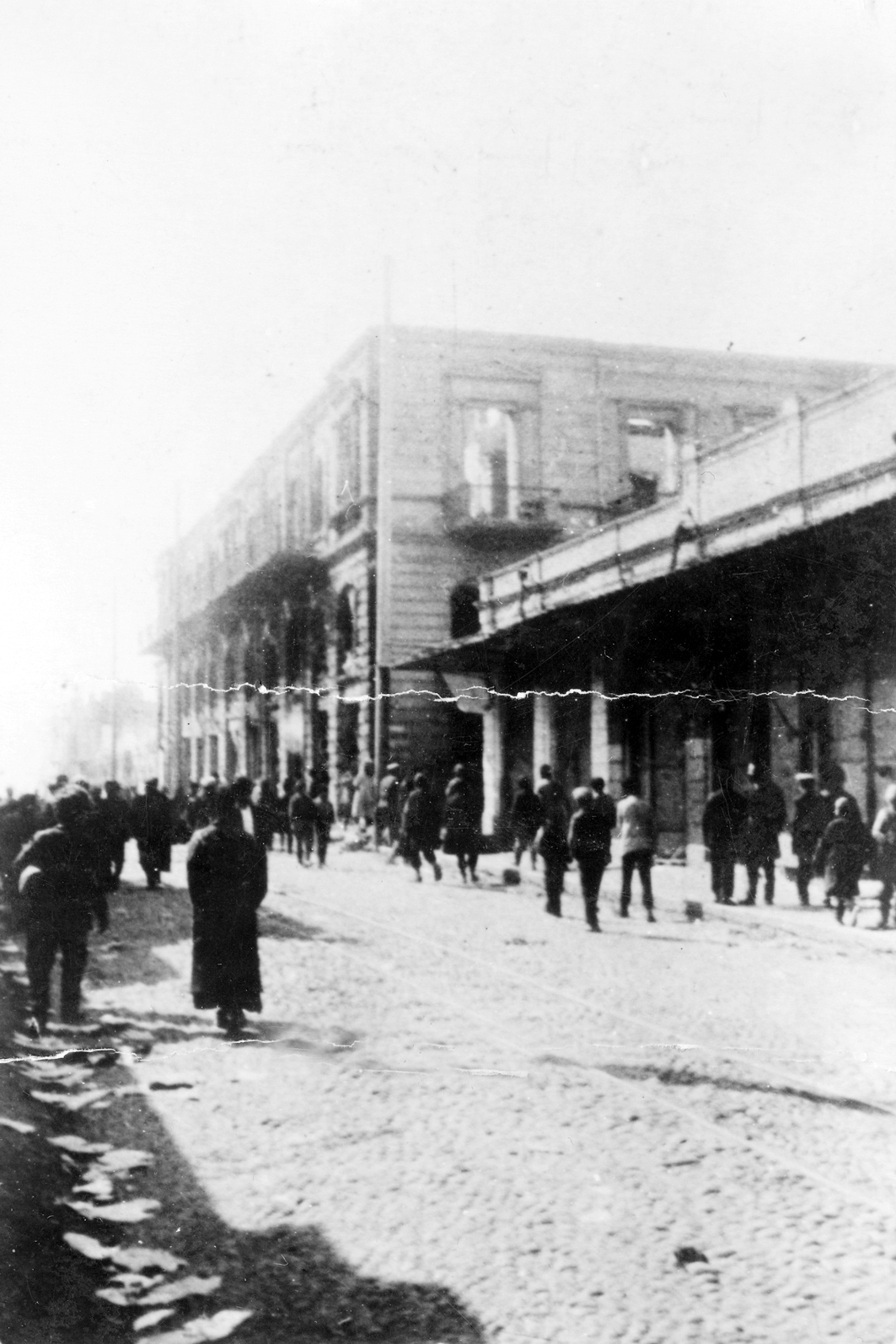
Pochtovaya Street (present-day Taghizadeh Street)

== Death toll ==
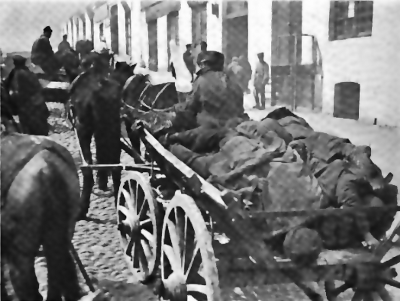
Removing the dead from the streets

The May 1918 dispatch of The New York Times stated that "2,000 were killed and 3,000 were wounded in [the] struggle between Russians and Mussulmans". A later 1919 publication by The New York Times reported – presumably citing Azerbaijani officials – that 12,000 people were killed during the events. The same publication wrote that, according to Azerbaijani representatives, the Bolsheviks crushed Muslims with assistance from Armenians who wanted to "wipe out old enemies and seize their lands". The 1920 New York Times Current History edition used the same figure of 12,000 victims. French journalist Henry Barby estimated in 1921 that 7,000 Muslims and 3,000 Bolsheviks and Armenians had died. The leader of Baku Soviet, Stepan Shahumyan, claimed that more than 3,000 killed in two days from both sides. ARF leader Karekin Pastermadjian, in his October 1918 article for the Armenian Herald – a publication of the Boston-based Armenian National Union of America – asserted that over 10,000 Azerbaijanis and nearly 2,500 Armenians were killed, without mentioning whether these casualties were military, civilian or both.

The Azerbaijani delegation to the 1919 Paris Peace Conference provided the following interpretation of the March Days:

In that bloodthirsty episode, which had such fatal effects upon the Muslims, the principal part was played by the Armenians, who were then in Baku, clustering as elsewhere around their nationalist party [ARF]... The truth is that the Armenians under the guise of Bolshevism, rushed on the Muslims and massacred during a few frightful days more than 12,000 people, many of whom were old men, women, and children.

Other sources mention varying estimates. For example, Archbishop Bagrat of Baku stated that 300 Russians and Armenians were killed, while estimating 700 Muslim deaths. Iranian newspapers, using information from Iranian subjects who had returned from Baku immediately after the violence, reported a death toll of 1,200 for Russians and Armenians, while estimating that 2,000 Muslims had also died. The Persian consul to Baku estimated 5,000 Muslim deaths, without mentioning Russian and Armenian deaths. A surviving 1919 deposition before the Azerbaijani Extraordinary Investigation Commission records a witness saying that up to 3,000 Muslims were killed, again omitting to mention deaths of Armenians or Russians.

In partisan scholarship, Armenian sources put the number of Muslim victims at around 3,000, while Azerbaijani sources estimate 12,000. The figure of 3,000, a number also cited by Shaumyan in a private letter to Vladimir Lenin, is more widely accepted amongst independent historians.

According to Firuz Kazemzadeh:

The brutalities continued for weeks. No quarter was given by either side: neither age nor sex was respected. Enormous crowds roamed the streets, burning houses, killing every pass-by who was identified as an enemy, many innocent persons suffering death at the hands of both the Armenians and the Azerbaijanis. The struggle which had begun as a political contest between Musavat and the Soviet assumed the character of a gigantic race riot.

Contemporary Azerbaijani sources refer to the March Days as a genocide, although the majority of historic sources and accounts interpret the March events in the context of civil war unrest. The massacres committed by Armenians, in particular, are interpreted by some historians as retaliation for the Armenian genocide.

== Aftermath ==
The March Days were followed by the September days where 10,000–30,000 ethnic Armenians were massacred by Army of Islam and their local Azerbaijani allies upon capturing Baku.

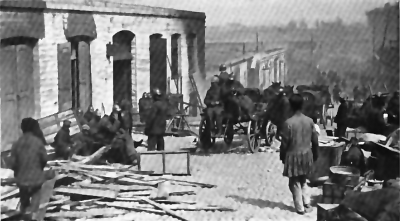
The aftermath in the Tatar (i.e. Azerbaijani) quarter

In the immediate aftermath of the March Days, many of the Muslim survivors fled to Elisabethpol (Ganja) in central Azerbaijan. While the Temporary Executive Committee of the Muslim National Councils and the Musavat ceased their activities in the territory of the Baku Governorate, the left-wing Azerbaijani political groups, such as the SRs and the Hümmet, benefited from the developments and became effective leaders of the Azerbaijani community in Baku. The Muslim Socialist Bureau appealed to the Committee of Revolutionary Defense to redress some of the grievances of some of the Muslims.

On 13 April 1918, within few days of the massacres, the Bolsheviks under the leadership of Stepan Shahumyan proclaimed the Baku Commune. This new body endeavored to nationalize Baku's oil fields, drawing the ire of the British, and formed the "Red Army of Baku", an undisciplined and poorly managed force composed largely of ethnic Armenian recruits. The 26 Baku Commissars were not all commissars and were not all Bolsheviks; There were many ethnicities among them: Greek, Latvian, Jewish, Russian, Georgian, Armenian and two of them were ethnic Azerbaijani revolutionaries, Meshadi Azizbekov and Mir Hasan Vazirov. Nevertheless, in the Azerbaijani psyche, the Baku Commune symbolized the Bolshevik – Armenian collusion born out of the March Days bloodbath.

The March Days of 1918 had a profound effect on the formulation of Azerbaijani political objectives as well. While previously Azerbaijani leaders had sought only autonomy within the Russian domain, after the Bolshevik-perpetrated massacres in Baku, they no longer believed in the Russian Revolution and turned to the Ottomans for support in achieving total independence. Therefore, when the Azerbaijan Democratic Republic was proclaimed on 28 May 1918, its government immediately dispatched a delegation to Istanbul to discuss the possibility of Ottoman military support for the young republic. The Ottoman triumvir, Enver Pasha, agreed to the Azerbaijani requests and charged his brother, Nuru Pasha, with forming an Ottoman military unit, known as the Caucasus Army of Islam, to retake Baku. When in July 1918, the Ottoman-Azerbaijani force defeated the "Red Army of Baku" in several key battles in Central Azerbaijan, Bolshevik power in Baku started crumbling under pressure from the Russian Socialist Revolutionaries, Dashnaks, and British agents in the city. On 1 August 1918, the Baku Commune was replaced by the Centrocaspian Dictatorship, which desperately invited a 1000-strong British expeditionary force led by General Lionel Dunsterville to the city. This proved a futile effort and, in the face of an overwhelming Ottoman-Azerbaijani offensive, the Dunsterforce fled and the Caucasus Army of Islam entered the Azerbaijani capital on 15 September 1918.

The March Days brought underlying tensions between Armenians and Azerbaijanis to the fore. Less than six months after the March massacres, when the Ottoman-Azerbaijani force entered Baku, the city fell into chaos and nearly 10,000 Armenians were massacred. A special commission formed by the Armenian National Council (ANC) reported a total of 8,988 ethnic Armenians massacred, among whom were 5,248 Armenian inhabitants of Baku, 1,500 Armenian refugees from other parts of the Caucasus who were in Baku, and 2,240 Armenians whose corpses were found in the streets but whose identities were never established. Although these figures were gathered by the Armenian National Council, and have been questioned by some, given the general run of events, they were unlikely to be greatly exaggerated.

While trying to escape Baku amidst the Ottoman-Azerbaijani offensive, the Bolshevik Baku Commissars were taken by ship across the Caspian to Krasnovodsk, where they were imprisoned by the Social Revolutionary Transcaspian Government, with the alleged support of the British. A few days later, on 20 September 1918, between the stations of Pereval and Akhcha-Kuyma on the Trans-Caspian railway, 26 of the Commissars were executed by firing squad.

== Analysis and interpretations ==
According to Michael Smith, Muslims faced a crushing defeat at the hands of Baku Soviet followed by an "unrestrained brutality of Dashnak forces". While in the aftermath of the tragic events, Musavat used them to foster a national memory of pain, its leader M. E. Rasulzade provided an analysis which seems to reflect the essence of witness accounts. In Rasulzade's view, Bolsheviks and their supporters sought to diminish Musavat's influence among Azerbaijani masses for a long time, and Muslim elites felt frustrated and powerless in face of this pressure. March Days were a violent culmination in this assault of Russian Bolshevism against the unprepared Azerbaijani people.

=== Azerbaijani position ===
The leader of Musavat Mammed Amin Rasulzade stated with regard to the March Days:

Musavat was blamed for the March events. It is absolutely baseless, because to declare a war one must possess at least some physical strength, which Musavat lacked. Others accuse Musavat that it provoked the March events by defending the idea of autonomy for Azerbaijan. This could resemble the truth to a certain extent. If we obediently bowed to the enemies of our freedom, these events might not have happened. But we could not have done that. We openly claimed the autonomy for Azerbaijan, and this increased the number of our enemies.

In Soviet Azerbaijan, historical accounts of March Days were made to support the actions of Baku Soviet and to condemn Musavat as the culprit of the tragedy. Soviet historiography also tried to suppress the memory of 1918 massacres and omitted the fact that Bolsheviks used the Armenian-Azerbaijani ethnic confrontation to gain power. However, in 1978, then-leader of Soviet Azerbaijan, Heydar Aliyev recalled the forgotten March Days in his speech dedicated to the 100th anniversary of Stepan Shahumyan as follows:

In March 1918, the Musavatist anti-Soviet rebellion was raised in Baku, intending to strangle the Soviet Government. Thanks to the firm and resolute action of the Bolsheviks, however, the rebellion was extinguished."

Exactly twenty years later, as the President of independent Azerbaijan, Heydar Aliyev issued a decree condemning March Days as the beginning of Azerbaijani genocide. Text of the 1998 Presidential decree describes the March events as follows:

Taking advantage of the situation following the end of the First World War and the February and October 1917 revolutions in Russia, the Armenians began to pursue the implementation of their plans under the banner of Bolshevism. Under the watchword of combating counter-revolutionary elements, in March 1918 the Baku commune began to implement a criminal plan aimed at eliminating Azerbaijanis from the whole of Baku province.

=== Soviet position ===
The Baku Soviet's Committee of Revolutionary Defense issued a proclamation early in April explaining the events and their causes. The statement claimed an anti-Soviet character of the rebellion and blamed Musavat and its leadership for the events. Soviet's statement asserted that there was a carefully laid out conspiracy by Musavat to overthrow the Baku Soviet and to establish its own regime:

The enemies of Soviet power in the city of Baku have raised their head. The malice and hatred with which they viewed the revolutionary organ of the workers and soldiers began recently to overflow into open counterrevolutionary activities. The appearance of the staff of the Savage Division, headed by the unmasked Talyshkhanov, the events in Lenkoran, in Mugan, and at Shemakha, the capture of Petrovsk by the Daghestan regiment and the withholding of grain shipments from Baku, the threats of Elisavetpol, and in the last few days of Tbilisi, to march on Baku, against soviet power, the aggressive movements of the armored train of the Transcaucasian Commissariat in Adzhikabul, and, finally, the outrageous behavior of the Savage Division on the steamship Evelina in shooting comrades—all this speaks of the criminal plans of the counterrevolutionaries grouped mainly around the Bek party Musavat and having as its goal the overthrow of Soviet power.

Shahumian considered the March events to be a triumph of the Soviet power in the Caucasus:

Transcaucasia has entered a period of active armed struggle for the Soviet power. For three days, 30th, 31 March and 1 April, a furious battle raged in the city of Baku. On one side were fighting the Soviet Red Guard; the Red International Army, recently organized by us; the Red Fleet, which we had succeeded in reorganizing in a short time; and Armenian national units. On the other side the Muslim Savage Division in which there were quite a few Russian officers, and bands of armed Muslims, led by the Musavat Party... For us the results of the battle were brilliant. The destruction of the enemy was complete. We dictated to them the conditions which were signed without reservation. More than three thousand were killed on both sides. The Soviet power in Baku has always been hanging by a thread, due to the resistance of Muslim nationalistic parties. These parties led by feudal intelligentsia (beks and khans), which settled in Elisavetpol and Tbilisi thanks to the degraded and cowardly politics of the Mensheviks became very aggressive in Baku too. ... If they had taken the control of Baku, the city would have been declared the capital of Azerbaijan and all non-Muslim elements would have been disarmed and killed.

In the opinion of the American historian Tadeusz Swietochowski, "in his enthusiasm, Shahumyan might not have remembered that in 1905 he himself had accused the tsardom of reaping in benefits of the Muslim-Armenian massacres. It is doubtful that to him, as opposed to the Azerbaijanis, any similarity suggested itself."

Joseph Stalin, who was Bolshevik People's Commissar at the time, stated in the "Pravda" newspaper that the March Days happened in protest of Transcaucasian Commissariat in Tbilisi:

All of Armenia is protesting against the usurpation of the self-proclaimed Tiflis "government", demanding the resignation of the Sejm deputies. And the center of Muslims, Baku, the citadel of Soviet power in Transcaucasus, unified around itself the entire Eastern Transcaucasus, from Lenkoran and Kuba till Elizavetpol, with arms in hands is asserting the rights of people of Transcaucasus, who try by all forces to maintain a link with Soviet Russia.

Victor Serge in Year One (First Year) Of the Russian Revolution: "The Soviet at Baku, led by Shahumyan, was meanwhile making itself the ruler of the area, discreetly but unmistakably. Following the Moslem rising of 18 (30) March, it had to introduce a dictatorship. This rising, instigated by the Musavat, set the Tartar and Turkic population, led by their reactionary bourgeoisie, against the Soviet, which consisted of Russians with support from the Armenians. The races began to slaughter each other in the street. Most of the Turkic port-workers (the ambal) either remained neutral or supported the Reds. The contest was won by the Soviets."

=== Armenian position ===
The Armenian view of the March 1918 events was documented in a letter written by Archbishop Bagrat to the American mission in Baku. The letter began with the accusation that the Azerbaijanis, being the disciples of the Turks and the Germans, could not be trusted. Having thus disposed of the Azerbaijani version of the events, Bagrat stated that the battle was waged by the Musavat and the Soviet, while the Armenians remained neutral. The Archbishop claimed that some Armenian soldiers took part in the fighting, but that those were only isolated individuals for whom the Armenian National Council could not be held responsible. He also claimed that the Armenians gave shelter to some 20,000 Muslims during the struggle.

Armenians had been inflamed by the sight and pitiful stories of several hundred thousand refugees who had succeeded in reaching Transcaucasia, fleeing before the Ottoman Army. Consequently, when the Russian Army broke up, the Armenians preserved their discipline against all attempts of the Bolsheviks, and were the only force upon which the Allies could count in southwestern Asia during the last year of the war. The two million Armenians of Transcaucasia, increased by several hundred thousand refugees from the Ottoman Empire, persisted in their loyalty to Russia until the Treaty of Brest-Litovsk delivered them to the Ottoman Empire. Then they moved to form their own state, which succeeded in maintaining itself during the period of anarchy and famine that Bolshevism brought upon the Russian Empire. At the Peace Conference, speaking before the Council of Ten, M. Aharonian, delegate of the Armenian Republic of the Caucasus, stated that the two and a half million Armenians in Transcaucasia wanted to cast in their fortunes with the Armenians of Ottoman Empire to form a Greater Armenia. According to Michael P. Croissant, the ARF set out to take revenge for the persecution and genocide suffered by Armenians at the hands of the Ottomans, while Tadeusz Swietochowski states that "Armenian historians do not offer an explanation for the political calculations behind this move, which was bound to entail terrible retribution, and they hint rather at an uncontrollable emotional outburst".

=== Other positions ===
According to Firuz Kazemzadeh, the Soviet provoked March events to eliminate its most formidable rival – the Musavat. However, when Soviet leaders reached out to ARF for assistance against the Azerbaijani nationalists, the conflict degenerated into a massacre with the Armenians killing the Muslims irrespective of their political affiliations or social and economic position.

Following an investigation, the Scientific Service of the German Bundestag came to the conclusion that, in specialist literature and journalism, there are different accounts of the events, incidents and casualty figures, which makes a reliable account difficult.

=== International recognition ===
On 27 March 2012, the New York State Senate adopted the first-ever legislative resolution J3784-2011 proclaiming 31 March 2012 as the Azerbaijani Remembrance Day. The resolution was introduced by the State Senator James Alesi at the initiative of the members of Azerbaijan Society of America and Azerbaijani-American Council.

On 31 December 2010, Governor Jim Gibbons of the U.S. State of Nevada proclaimed 31 March as Remembrance Day of 1918 massacres of Azerbaijani civilians in what became the first such recognition by the U.S. government institution.

== See also ==
- List of massacres in Azerbaijan
- Azerbaijan Democratic Republic
- September Days

== Bibliography ==
- Kazemzadeh, Firuz (1950). The Struggle for Transcaucasia (1917–1921). Anglo Caspian Press Lted. p. 360. ISBN 978-0-9560004-0-8.
- Alstatdt, Audrey L. (1992). The Azerbaijani Turks: power and identity under Russian rule. Hoover Press. ISBN 978-0-8179-9182-1.
- Ratgauzer, Iakov A. (1927). Революция и гражданская война в Баку, 1917–1918. Красный Восток.
- Swietochowski, Tadeusz (2004). Russian Azerbaijan, 1905–1920: The Shaping of a National Identity in a Muslim Community. Cambridge University Press. ISBN 978-0-521-52245-8.
- Suny, Ronald Grigor (1972). The Baku Commune. Princeton University Press. pp. 217–221. ISBN 978-0-691-05193-2.
- Northcote, Dudley S. (1922). "Saving Forty Thousand Armenians". Current History. New York Times Co.
- Pasdermadjian, Garegin (1918). Why Armenia Should be Free: Armenia's Role in the Present War. The Armenian National Union of America. pp. 188–199.
- Balayev, Aydin (October 2008). "A Defining Moment For Azerbaijan". Azerbaijan in the World. I (18). Archived from the original on 5 April 2023.
- Smith, Michael G. (2001). "Anatomy of a Rumour: Murder Scandal, the Musavat Party and Narratives of the Russian Revolution in Baku, 1917-20". Journal of Contemporary History. 36 (2): 211–240. doi:10.1177/002200940103600202. ISSN 0022-0094. S2CID 159744435.
