= Ivan Fioletov =

Russian revolutionary activist (1884-1918)

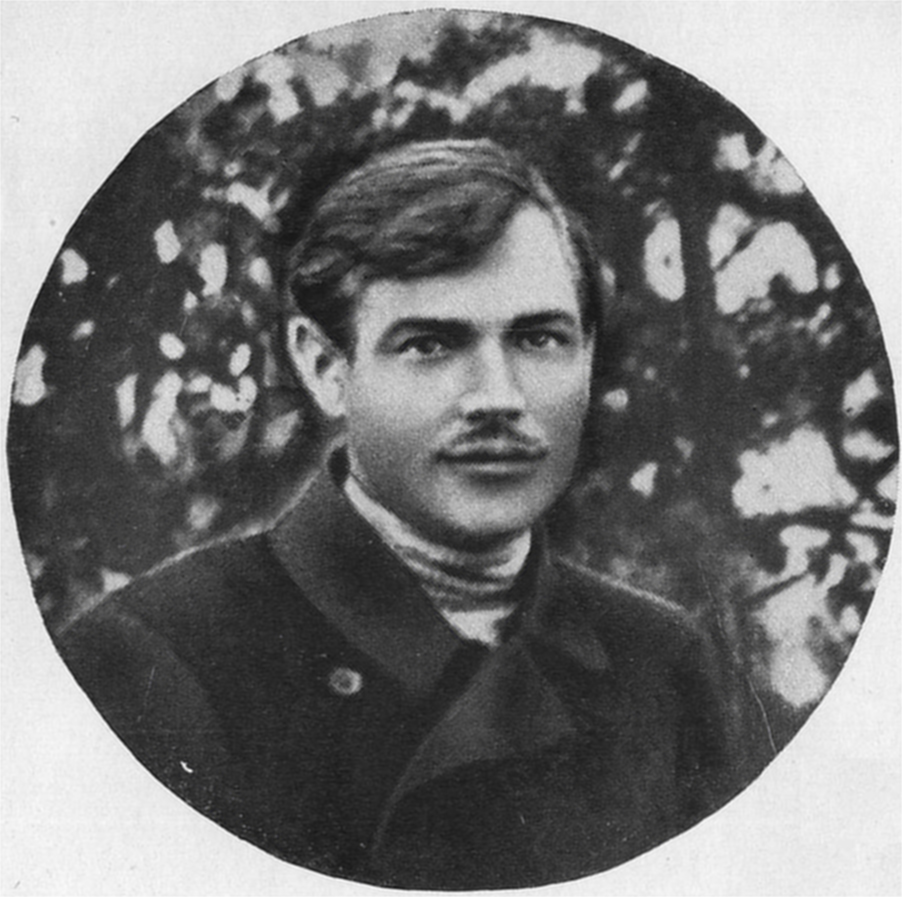
Ivan Fioletov

Funeral of 26 Baku Commissars in 1920 (the crying woman is Mir Hasan Vezirov's mother).

Ivan Timofeevich Fioletov (Russian: Иван Тимофеевич Фиолетов; 1884 – 20 September 1918) was a Russian revolutionary activist and one of the Bolshevik Party leaders in Azerbaijan during the Russian Revolution.

== Biography ==
Fioletov was born into a poor peasant family in Tugolukovo, in the Tambov Governorate of the Russian Empire. In 1890 his family moved to Baku where he worked as a metalworker. He became a member of Russian Social Democratic Labour Party in 1900 and during the Russian Revolution of 1905 he was one of the trade union activists of oil-industry workers in Groznyy and Baku. Fioletov became one of the 26 Baku Commissars of the Soviet Commune that was established in the city after the October Revolution. When the Commune was toppled by the Centro Caspian Dictatorship, a British-backed coalition of Dashnaks, SRs and Mensheviks, Fioletov and his comrades were captured and executed by firing squad between the stations of Pereval and Akhcha-Kuyma of Transcaucasian Railroad.

The Molokan town of Fioletovo, situated in the North of Armenia, is named after him as is the Fioletovo Commuter Train Station in Baku.
