= Adalat Party (Azerbaijan) =

Adalat Party (Azerbaijani: Ədalət, lit. 'justice') or also "Adalat" organization was formed after the first Russian Revolution by Iranian workers in Baku in 1916 or in 1912. It was a transnational political party with branches abroad, especially in Iran.

Its members included revolutionary members of the Social Democratic Party of Iran. The Adalat Party was inspired by the activities of the Russian social-democratic organizations. Its program, manifesto and method were adopted from the Russian Social Democratic Party. It started to operate openly in May 1917. The head of the party was Asadulla Gafarzade from Ardabil. The party published the newspaper "Adalat" and the magazine "Beyraqi-Adalat" in Azeri and Persian.

The office of the party was in the Iranian owned school "Tamaddun" in the Sabunchu. Armed groups were also included in the party.

Adalat Party cooperated with Hummet and the Baku bolsheviks. In 1920, Adalat Party together with Hummet and the Baku branch of Russian Communist Party were absorbed by Azerbaijani Communist Party. Its Iranian branch was renamed to Communist Party of Iran.

== See also ==
- Gilan republic
