= 26 Baku Commissars =

Bolshevik and Left SR members of the 1918 Baku Commune

Baku Commune Бакинская коммуна (Russian) Bakı Kommunası (Azerbaijani)
- 1918
- Capital: Baku
  - Type: Commune
- Historical era: World War I
  - March Days: 13 April 1918
  - July 26 Baku Coup d'état: 26 July 1918
Preceded by	Succeeded by
Baku Governorate; TDFR	Centrocaspian Dictatorship
- Today part of: Azerbaijan

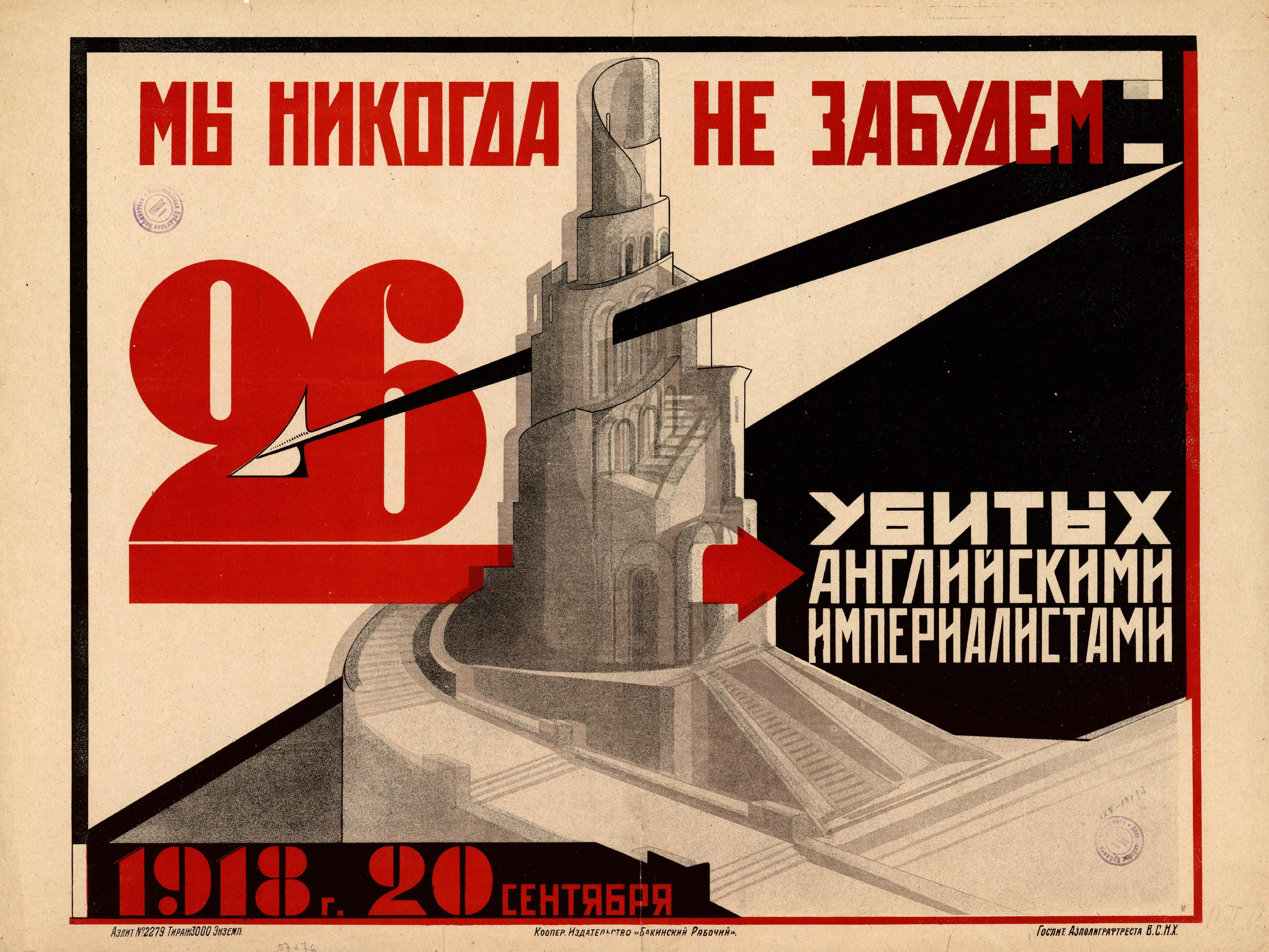
Soviet poster: "We will never forget the 26 murdered by British imperialists. 1918, September 20." By unknown artist. Baku, 1925

The 26 Baku Commissars were Bolshevik and Left Socialist Revolutionary (SR) members of the Baku Commune. The commune was established in the city of Baku, which was then the capital of the briefly independent Azerbaijan Democratic Republic, and is now the capital of the Republic of Azerbaijan. The commune, led by Armenian revolutionary Stepan Shahumyan, existed until 26 July 1918, when the Bolsheviks were forced out of power by a coalition of Dashnaks, Right SRs and Mensheviks.

After their overthrow, the Baku commissars attempted to leave Baku but were captured by the Centrocaspian Dictatorship and imprisoned. On 14 September 1918, during the fall of Baku to Ottoman forces, Red Army soldiers broke into their prison and freed the commissars; they then boarded a ship to Krasnovodsk, where they were promptly arrested by local authorities and, on the night of 20 September, executed by a firing squad between the stations of Pereval and Akhcha-Kuyma on the Transcaspian Railway by Turkmen SR soldiers of the Ashkhabad Committee. They were executed for essentially letting the Islamic Army of the Caucasus seize Baku.

== Baku Commune ==
The Baku Commune lasted from 13 April to 25 July 1918. It came to power after the bloody confrontation with the Muslim population, known as the March Days in Baku. During its brief existence, the Commune had to face several problems: from the shortage of food and supplies to the threat of a strong army of the Ottoman Empire which wanted to attack Baku. Despite the difficult conditions, the Commune carried out several social reforms, such as the nationalization of the oil industry.

Modeled on the Paris Commune, the Baku Commune included its own Council of People's Commissars (Sovnarkom) and Commissariat of Foreign Affairs.

On 5 June 1918, the Baku Red Army repulsed an assault by overwhelming Ottoman forces, but later it launched an unsuccessful assault on Ganja, the headquarters of the Ottoman Army of Islam, and was obliged to retreat to Baku. At this point, Dashnaks, Right SRs and Mensheviks started to negotiate with General Dunsterville, the commander of the British troops in Persia, inviting his troops to Baku to defend the city from an imminent Ottoman attack. The Bolsheviks and their leftist allies opposed this scheme, but on 25 July the majority of the Soviet voted to call in the British, and the Bolsheviks resigned. The Baku Commune was imprisoned by Turkmen Social Revolutionaries for participation in unlawful military formations, particularly for the March Days atrocities and was replaced by the Central-Caspian Dictatorship.

In contrast to what happened in many parts of Russia, where the Bolsheviks earned a reputation for ruthlessness in executing those who did not support them, the Bolsheviks of Baku were not so strict. The Cheka in Baku executed only two persons, both members of the Soviet caught embezzling public funds: the Commissar for Finance, Aleksandr Kireev, and the commissar of the steamship Meve, Sergei Pokrovskii.

== The executions ==
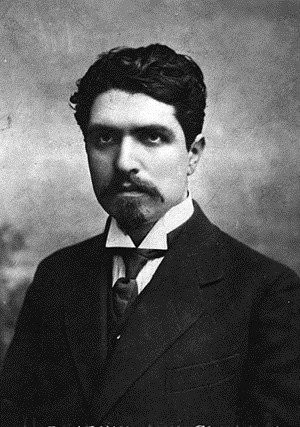
Stepan Shahumyan, the leader of the 26 commissars

After the fall of the Baku Soviet in July 1918, the Bolshevik leaders and some loyal troops tried to reach Astrakhan, the only Caspian port still in Bolshevik hands. However, their ship was intercepted by the military vessels of the Caspian fleet and after undergoing an hour's bombardment mid-sea, they surrendered and returned to Baku. Most of the Bolshevik militants were arrested and remained in prison until a commando unit led by Anastas Mikoyan freed them from their prison.

Shahumyan, Dzhaparidze, Azizbekov, and their comrades, along with Mikoyan, then boarded the ship Turkmen, intending to reach Astrakhan by sea. According to recent historians, the sailors chose instead to sail to Krasnovodsk for fear of being arrested in Astrakhan. At Krasnovodsk the commissars were arrested by the town's commandant, who requested further orders from the "Ashkhabad Committee", led by the Socialist Revolutionary Fyodor Funtikov, about what should be done with them. Three days later, British Major-General Wilfrid Malleson, on hearing of their arrest, contacted Britain's liaison-officer in Ashkhabad, Captain Reginald Teague-Jones, to suggest that the commissars be handed over to British forces to be used as hostages in exchange for British citizens held by the Soviets. That same day, Teague-Jones attended the committee's meeting in Ashkabad which had the task of deciding the fate of the Commissars. For some reason, Teague-Jones did not communicate Malleson's request to the committee, and claimed he left before a decision was made. He further claimed that the next day he discovered the committee had eventually decided to issue orders that the commissars should be executed. According to historian Richard H. Ullman, Teague-Jones could have stopped the executions if he wanted to, since the Ashkabad Committee was dependent on British support and could not refuse a request from its powerful ally, but he decided not to intervene.

On the night of 20 September 1918, three days after being arrested, 26 of the commissars were executed by a firing squad between the stations of Pereval and Akhcha-Kuyma on the Trans-Caspian railway. How Anastas Mikoyan, who was part of the group, managed to survive is still uncertain, as is the reason why his life was spared. In 1922, V. Chaikin, a Socialist Revolutionary journalist, published a description of the moments before the execution.

At around 6 A.M. [relates a witness], the 26 commissars were told of the fate awaiting them while they were in the train. They were taken out in groups of eight or nine men. They were obviously shocked, and kept a tense silence. One sailor shouted: "I'm not afraid, I'm dying for liberty." One of the executioners replied that "We too will die for liberty sooner or later, but we mean it in a different way from you." The first group of commissars, led from the train in the semi-darkness, was dispatched with a single salvo. The second batch tried to run away but was mown down after several volleys. The third resigned itself to its fate ...

== Impact ==
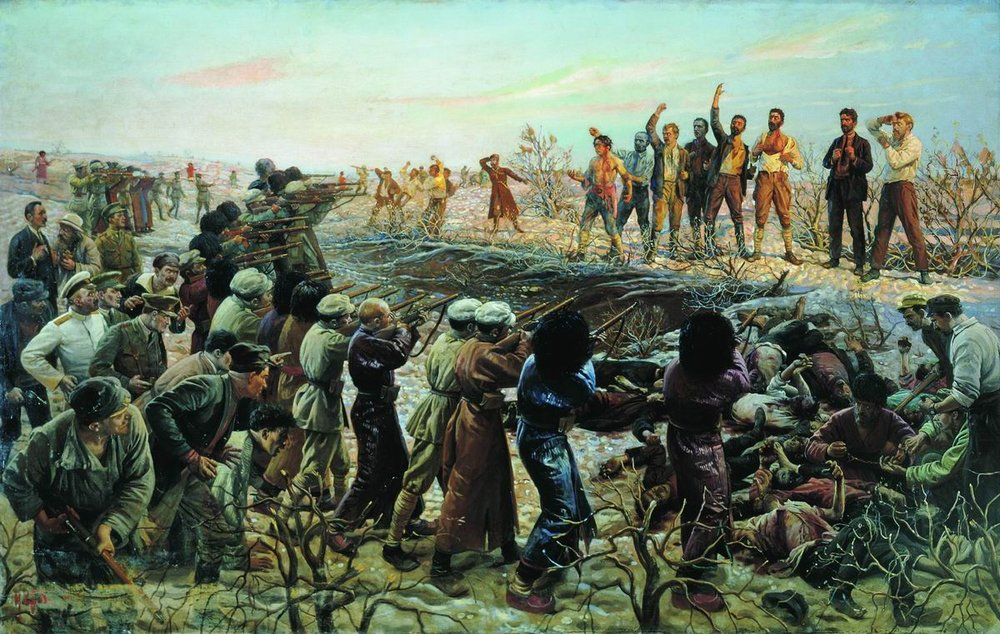
Isaak Brodsky's The Execution of the Twenty Six Baku Commissars (1925) depicting the Soviet view of the execution.

Soviet officials later blamed the executions on British agents acting in the Baku area at the time. When Soviet rule was established in the whole Caspian area, Funtikov, the head of the Ashkhabad 'Directorate' responsible for the executions, was imprisoned. Funtikov put all blame for the executions onto Britain and, in particular, Teague-Jones, who, he claimed, had ordered him to have the commissars shot. Funtikov was tried and shot in Baku in 1926. Britain denied involvement in the incident, saying it was done by local officials without any knowledge of the British.

This accusation caused a further souring of relations between Britain and the nascent Soviet government and helped lead to the confrontational attitude of both sides in the coming years.

According to Soviet historiography, two British officers on board the commissars' ship ordered it to sail to Krasnovodsk instead of Astrakhan, where they found a government led by SRs and British officers who immediately ordered the arrest of the commissars. The Soviets would later immortalize the 26 commissars as fallen heroes, through movies, artwork, stamps, and public works, including the 26 Commissars Memorial in Baku. In Isaak Brodsky's famous painting, British officers are depicted as being present at the executions.

== Soviet investigations ==
Boris Vladimirovich Sennikov published a book in 2004 about his findings on the Tambov Rebellion where he mentioned several facts about the event.

Sennikov claims that the famous Brodsky's painting is an invention of the Soviet historiography. The truth was established by the special commission of the All-Russian Central Executive Committee (VTsIK) that arrived from Moscow. The commission was headed by Vadim Chaikin (PSR). The commission also consisted of a big group of a high-ranking Moscow's Cheka officers headed by Jēkabs Peterss, an international criminal associated with the Siege of Sidney Street. Sennikov also brings up a quote of Chaikin in the article of Suren Gazaryan "That should not be repeated" in the Leningrad magazine "Zvezda": "The painting of Brodsky Execution of the 26 Baku Commissars is historically false. They were not shot, but rather decapitated. And the executioner of the penalty was a single man - a Turkmen, a gigantic strength bogatyr. That Turkmen by himself with his own hands using a shashka beheaded all of them." The pit with remains of the commissars and their heads was uncovered under the surveillance of the VTsIK special commission and representatives of Cheka. The report on the death of Baku commissars was sent by the commission to VTsIK, Sovnarkom, and the Central Committee of RKP(b).

In 1922 Vadim Chaikin published his book To the history of the Russian Revolution through the Grazhbin Publishing (Moscow) commemorating the first part "Execution of 26 Baku Commissars" to the event. After serving time in the Oryol Prison Chaikin on 11 September 1941, was executed by a firing squad along with 156 other Oryol prison inmates during the Medvedev Forest massacre.

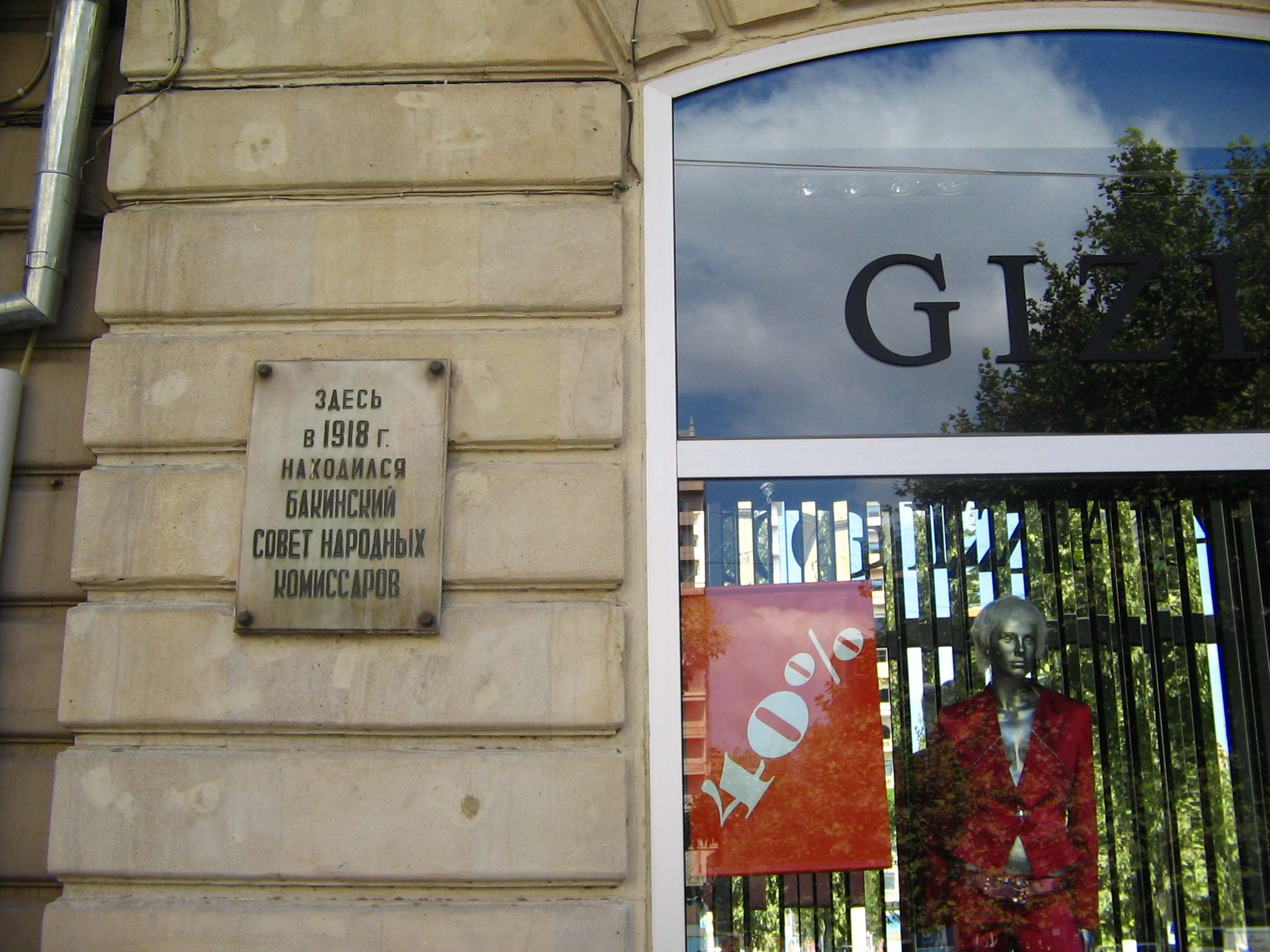
Baku, 2005. The wall of the house of the Baku Commissariat (1918)

== The Commissars ==
Funeral of the 26 Baku Commissars in 1920. The crying women is the mother of Mir Hasan Vezirov.

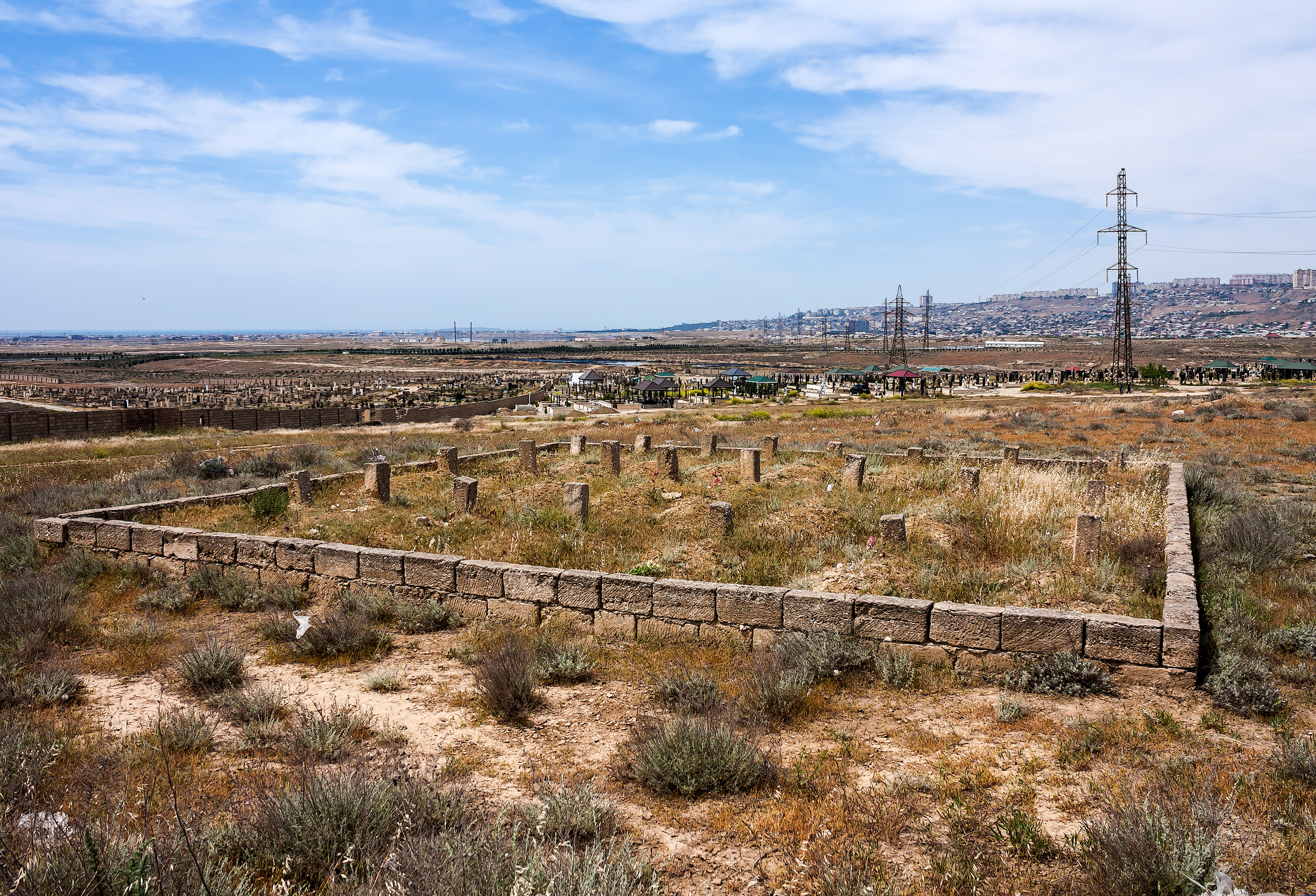
Burial site of 23 of the Baku commissars. Hovsan Cemetery. 9 May 2017

The 26 Baku Commissars comprised Bolsheviks and Left Social Revolutionaries, and excluded the Right SRs, Mensheviks, and Dashnaks. There were many ethnicities among them: Greek, Latvian, Jewish, Russian, Georgian, Armenian and Azerbaijani.

The 26 "commissars" were:

- Stepan Shaumian – Chairman of the Baku Council of the People's Commissars, Commissar Extraordinary for the Caucasus
- Meshadi Azizbekov – Deputy People's Commissar of Internal Affairs, gubernial commissar for Baku
- Prokopius Dzhaparidze – Chairman of the executive committee of the Baku Soviet
- Ivan Fioletov – Chairman of the Soviet of National Economy
- Mir-Hasan Vazirov – People's Commissar for Agriculture
- Grigory Korganov – People's Commissar for Military and Navy Affairs
- Yakov Zevin – People's Commissar for Labor
- Grigory Petrov – Military Commissar of the Baku region from the Sovnarkom of the Russian SFSR
- Ivan Malygin – Deputy Chairman of the Military Revolutionary Committee of the Caucasian Army
- Arsen Amiryan – Chief Editor of Baku Worker newspaper
- Meyer Velkovich Basin – Member of the Military Revolutionary Committee
- Suren Osepyanhy – Chief Editor of Izvestia of the Baku Council newspaper
- Eizhen Berg – Sailor
- Vladimir Polukhin – Collegiate Commissar for Military and Navy Affairs of the Russian SFSR
- Fyodor Solntsev – Commissar of the military instruction school
- Armenak Boriyan – Journalist
- Ivan Gabyshev – Political commissar of a brigade
- Mark Koganov – Member of the Military Revolutionary Committee
- Bagdasar Avakyan – Military Commandant of Baku
- Irakly Metaksa – Shahumyan's bodyguard
- Ivan Nikolayshvili – Dzhaparidze's bodyguard
- Aram Kostandyan – Deputy People's Commissar for Agriculture
- Solomon Bogdanov – Member of the Military Revolutionary Committee
- Anatoly Bogdanov – Clerk
- Isay Mishne – Secretary of the Military Revolutionary Committee
- Tatevos Amirov – Commander of a cavalry unit, member of Dashnaktsutiun

== Demolition of the 26 Commissars Memorial and reburial ==
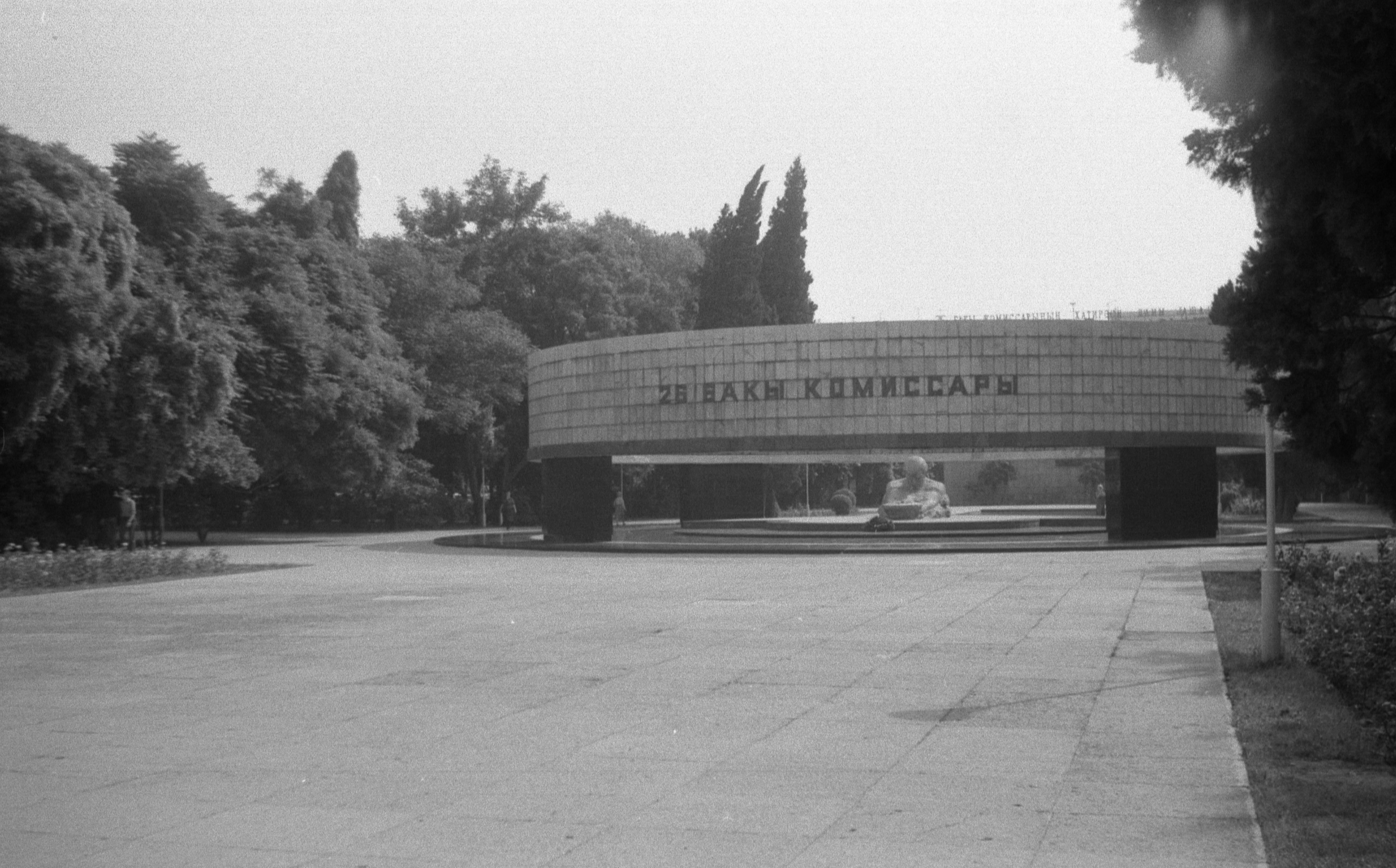
26 Commissars Memorial was a symbol of Azerbaijan SSR.

In 1920, the remains of the commissars were exhumed and reburied as Soviet martyrs in a central square in Baku. They remained there until 2009, when Azerbaijani authorities began demolishing the city's 26 Commissars Memorial. This was the latest monument of several that had been built to commemorate the commissars, erected in that park during the Soviet period. This last monument itself had been fenced-off since July 2008. The remains of the commissars were reburied at Hovsan Cemetery on 26 January 2009, with participation of Muslim, Jewish and Christian clergy, who conducted religious ceremonies.

The dismantling was opposed by some local left-wingers and by the Azerbaijan Communist Party in particular. It also upset Armenia, as the Armenian public believed that the demolition and reburial was motivated by the reluctance of the Azerbaijanis, after the Nagorno-Karabakh War to have ethnic Armenians buried in the center of their capital. Another scandal happened when Azerbaijani press reports claimed that during the exhumation only 21 bodies were discovered and that "Shahumyan and four other Armenian commissars managed to escape their murderers". This report was questioned by Shahumyan's granddaughter Tatyana, now living in Moscow, who told the Russian daily Kommersant that:

It is impossible to believe that they weren't all buried. There is a film in the archives of 26 bodies being buried. Apart from this, my grandmother was present at the reburial.

Almost all monuments in Azerbaijan dedicated to the commissars, including Shahumyan, Azizbekov, Dzhaparidze and Fioletov, have been demolished. Most streets named after the commissars have been renamed.

== In popular culture ==
The prominent Russian poet Sergei Yesenin wrote "Ballad of the Twenty-six" to commemorate the Baku Commissars, poem first published in The Baku Worker, 22 September 1925.

Russian band WOMBA named one of its albums The 27th Baku Commissar.

The prominent Italian writer Tiziano Terzani wrote about the Baku Commissars in his book Buonanotte, signor Lenin (Goodnight, Mr Lenin: A Journey Through the End of the Soviet Empire, 1992).

A street in southwest-central Moscow is named after the 26 Baku Commisars Ulitsa 26 Bakinskikh Komissarov.

== See also ==
- Transcaspian Government
