= 26 Baku Commissars Memorial =

Coordinates: 40.373090°N 49.845643°E

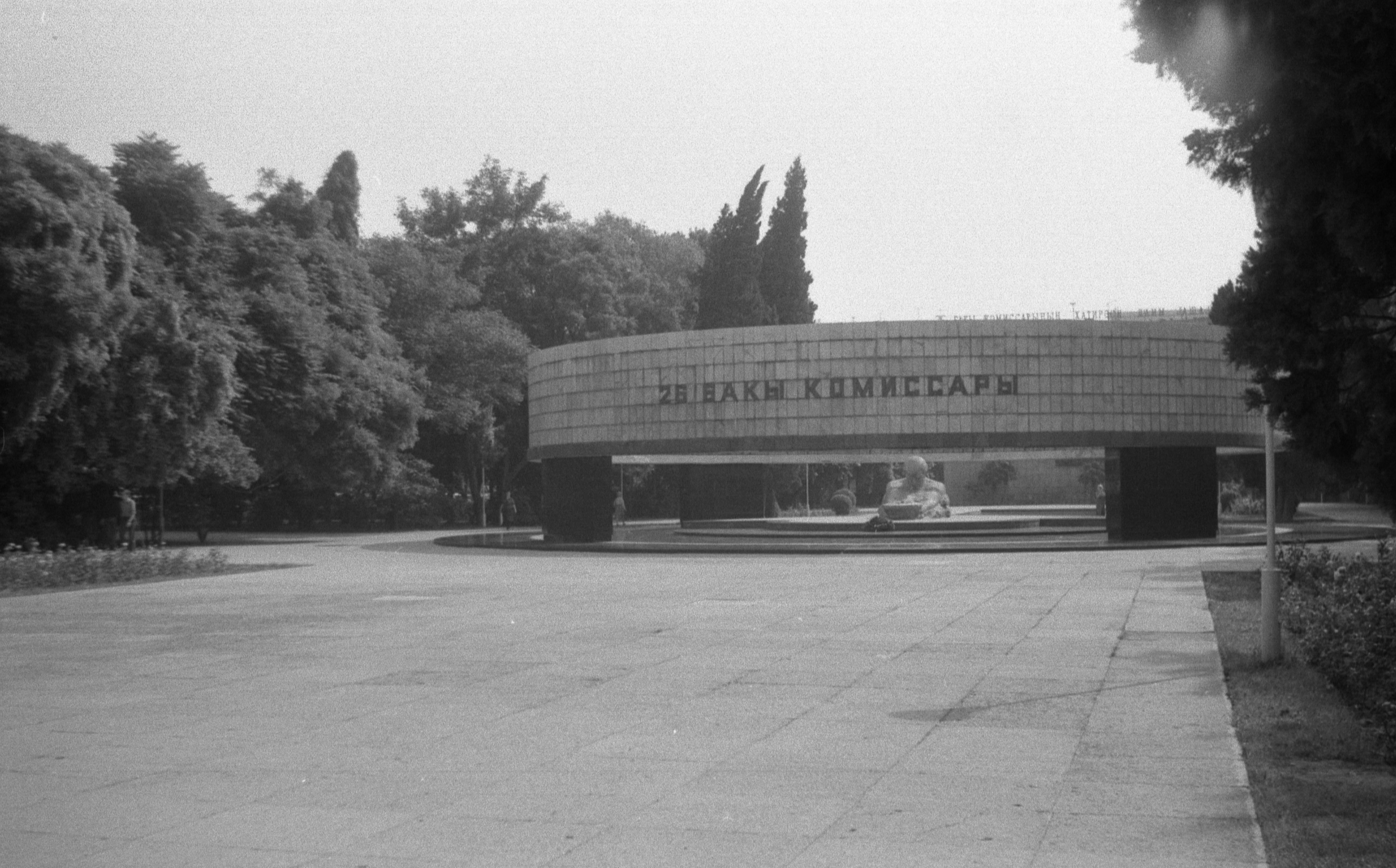
The 26 Baku Commissars Memorial in 1987.

The 26 Baku Commissars Memorial was a Soviet-era monument located in Baku, Azerbaijan, that paid tribute to the 26 Baku Commissars from the Baku commune. The commune was overthrown in 1918 and the commissars were later executed near Krasnovodsk (now Türkmenbaşy). The monument was constructed by sculptors I. Zeynalov and N. Mamedov, and architects G. Aleskerov and Alesker Huseynov, who eventually became prominent politicians in Azerbaijan. The remains of the Commissars were buried at the site of the memorial.

== Description ==
The centre of this large square was a theatrical monument with a man coming out of the ground holding what was previously an "eternal flame" (later extinguished). Hovering above him was a large stone circle that was once inscribed with the names of the slain commissars. All the wording on the monument was removed in the years after the dissolution of the Soviet Union, making the whole monument more ambiguous.

The square has a quiet garden and is the location of the Turkish embassy and the Akhundov National Library, Azerbaijan's main book repository.

== Demolition of the 26 Baku Commissars Memorial ==
The 26 Baku Commissars Memorial in Baku before its demolition in January 2009.

In January 2009, the Azeri authorities started the demolition of the 26 Baku Commissars Memorial, where the works were soon completed. The monument site itself had been fenced off since July 2008. The remains of the commissars were reburied at Hovsan Cemetery on 26 January 2009, with the participation of Muslim, Jewish, and Christian clergy who conducted religious ceremonies.

The dismantling was opposed by some local left-wingers and by the Azerbaijan Communist Party in particular. It also upset Armenia, as the Armenian public believed that the demolition and reburial were motivated by the reluctance of the Azerbaijanis (because of the Nagorno-Karabakh War) to have ethnic Armenians buried in the center of their capital. Another scandal happened when Azerbaijani press reports claimed that during the exhumation, only 21 bodies were discovered out of the expected 26 and that "Shaumian and four other Armenian commissars managed to escape their murderers". This report was questioned by Shahumian's granddaughter, Tatyana, now living in Moscow, who told the Russian daily Kommersant that:

It is impossible to believe that they weren’t all buried. There is a film in the archives of 26 bodies being buried. Apart from this, my grandmother was present at the reburial.
