= Mir Hasan Vazirov =

Azeri revolutionary

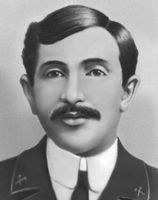
- Mir Hasan Vazirov

Deputy Chairman of the Council of Peasant Deputies of the Baku District
- In office May – June 1918
- Preceded by: Post established

Personal details
- Born: February 13, 1889 Shusha, Shusha Uyezd, Elisabethpol Governorate, Russian Empire
- Died: September 20, 1918 (aged 29) Krasnovodsk, Turkestan Autonomous Soviet Socialist Republic (now Bereket District, Balkan Region, Turkmenistan)
- Party: Socialist-Revolutionary Party
- Occupation: Politician, revolutionary

Mir Hasan Kazim oglu Vazirov, also spelled Vezirov (Azerbaijani: Mir Həsən Kazım bəy oğlu Vəzirov; Russian: Мир Гасан Кязим оглы Везиров; February 13, 1889 – September 20, 1918), was an Azerbaijani socialist revolutionary. Vazirov participated in revolutionary movements in the Russian Empire from his youth, for which he was persecuted by the authorities. Later on, he joined the Socialist-Revolutionary Party and became one of the 26 Baku Commissars. He was the great-grandson of Mirza Ali Muhammad Aga, vizier of Ibrahim Khalil Khan of Karabakh Khanate.

Together with his cousin Yusif Vazir Chamanzaminli, he published a satirical magazine in Russian language in Shusha called Trickster. Mir Hasan Vazirov's house in Karabakh was turned into a museum in the Azerbaijan SSR.

== Biography ==
Son of a teacher, he was born in the city of Shusha (then in Russian Empire). During his years in secondary school, he joined the revolutionary movement and became a member of the Socialist-Revolutionary Party. From 1917, he worked with the Bolsheviks and became one of the 26 Baku Commissars of the Soviet Commune which was established in the city of Baku after the October Revolution. He was the People's Commissar of agriculture from May 1918, Deputy Chairman of the Council of Peasant Deputies of the district of Baku.

On June 18, 1918, he authored a law that confiscated landowners' land and transferred it to the peasants who worked on it.

=== Death ===
Funeral of 26 Baku Commissars (the crying woman is the mother of Mir Hasan Vazirov).

When the Commune was toppled by the Centro Caspian Dictatorship, a British-backed coalition of Dashnaks, SRs and Mensheviks, Vazirov and his comrades were captured by British troops and executed by a firing squad between the stations of Pereval and Akhcha-Kuyma of Transcaucasian Railroad.
