= Novopokrovka =

Novopokrovka may refer to:

- Novopokrovka, Russia, name of several inhabited localities in Russia
- Novopokrovka, Kyrgyzstan, a village in Chüy Region, Kyrgyzstan
- Novopokrovka, Ukraine, name of several inhabited localities in Ukraine

== See also ==
- Pokrovka (disambiguation)
- Pokrov (disambiguation)
