= Lankaran operation =

Lankaran operation (1919)
- Part of the Mughan clashes
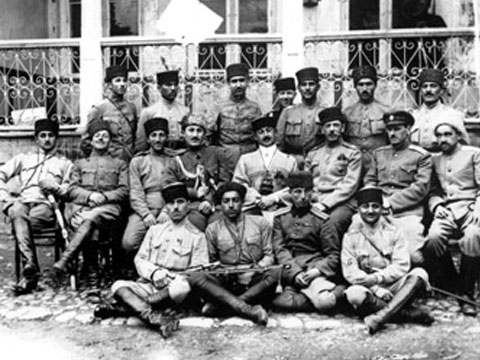
Date	1919
Location	Lankaran
Result	Azerbaijani victory

Belligerents
(Azerbaijan Democratic Republic) Azerbaijan	(Russian Empire) White Movement

Commanders and leaders
(Azerbaijan Democratic Republic) Habib Bey Salimov	(Russian Empire) Colonel Ilyashevich

Strength
3,500 soldiers	About 6,000

The Lankaran Operation (1919) was a military operation carried out by the Azerbaijani Army Corps (ADR) in the southern region of Azerbaijan to ensure the country's territorial integrity in August 1919.

When the ADR was announced, it could not immediately extend its sovereignty over the entire country, and the Lankaran Operation gradually evolved. During this time there was a struggle in the southern territories of the ADR, particularly in the districts of Javad and Lankaran, involving Azerbajani partisans, Bolsheviks, and the White Army. As a result of this struggle, the Azerbaijani forces emerged victorious, and the Lankaran Operation led to the complete dominance of the entire region under the authority of the ADR.

== Background ==
Until the fall of 1918, the Azerbaijani Army and the Islamic Army of the Caucasus cleared Baku and Karabakh of foreign forces. So except for Lankaran, a new government took control over the entire territory of Azerbaijan. Despite the next intended march direction being elsewhere, the situation changed due to the defeated state of the Ottoman Empire signing the Mudros Armistice, and the arrival of British forces in Baku. Consequently, the march planned for Lankaran was postponed. Lankaran held a strategically significant position that attracted the attention of various powers. Hence, despite being under the control of the Musavatists in early 1918, Bolsheviks arrived in the region aboard the ship "Aleksandr Jander" in April of the same year and took control of the area.

=== The White army takeover and the local population's reaction ===
However, the Bolsheviks' position weakened with the liberation of Baku. This time, the Russian nationalist forces, supported by the Russian population previously relocated to the region, gained strength. Colonel Ilyashevich, an Agha Javadi, and closely associated with Denikin, led these forces. He was formerly the commander of the 29th Russian Army stationed here to safeguard the Russian Empire's border with Iran. Ilyashevich, like other combatant Russian officers, regarded the territories of the Russian Empire as indivisible and did not acknowledge Azerbaijan's independence. One of his main objectives was to establish bases and create conditions for the Denikinist forces attacking here. Therefore, he relocated his headquarters from Bilasuvar village of Javad district to Prishib village of Lankaran District. Historian Mehman Suleymanov estimates his army to have had around 6,000 troops at that time. Under the pressure of these forces, the establishment of the ruling body was discussed in a meeting held on August 4–5. According to the decision made, a "Temporary Dictatorship" consisting of five people was created to govern these districts. This dictatorship was also referred to as the "Pentarchy Dictatorship." The forces behind their support were the Russian population in the region, aided by Denikin's forces and the Russian National Committee in Baku. Due to the activities of these forces, the local population sought assistance from the Azerbaijani army and Nuru Pasha in due time. Although they indicated they would resolve this issue shortly, the necessity of withdrawing the Ottoman forces from the region made it impossible. As the British supported the Denikinists, they could not organize a march into the region officially after October.In response to the locals' new appeal, the Foreign Minister of Azerbaijan Central Executive Committee (CEC) responded that this matter should be raised before General Thomson, the British military commander in Baku. The delegation led by Teymur bey Bayrampashov met with Thomson, expressing their desire for the reorganization of the region with Russian officers and the establishment of Azerbaijani authority. Thomson indicated that measures would be taken in response. However, shortly after, the Russian officers declared the creation of the Lankaran Republic and formed a government under Suxorukov. This new government sought recognition from Azerbaijan and therefore dispatched representatives to Baku under Gerasimov's leadership. Upon the representatives' return, a council was organized in the Prishib village, and according to the decision made, the region was not to be handed over to Azerbaijan. It was envisaged that the area would be included as an independent entity under the Mugan province.

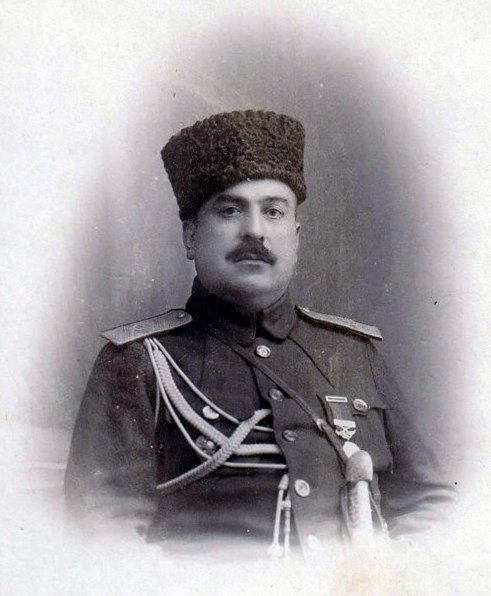
General Habib Bey Salimov

=== Establishment of Mughan Soviet Republic and resistance of local Azerbaijanis ===
Because it was relatively easy to march to Baku from there, the Bolsheviks were drawn to the area and sought to foment rebellion. In the summer of 1919, the Communist party's Caucasus Regional Committee began preparations to seize power in Lankaran through armed rebellion. According to the plan devised for the uprising, the Red partisans and other Bolshevik forces were to seize the toy institution's building, the military headquarters, the radio station, and the naval agency. The rebellion started on April 25. On that day, there was to be a meeting of Russian officers in the city, and at midday, the officers had dispersed to their homes for lunch. It was at this time that the Bolsheviks launched a sudden attack. Within a few hours, crucial parts of the city were taken. All the key figures in the institution set up by the officers were arrested. Jirikov was brought in as the temporary leader of the newly established revolution. On May 15, a council of Mughan village deputies was called in Lankaran to resolve the issue of authority. Many of the individuals at the congress were not Azerbaijani. David Chitkin was appointed as the president of the "Mughan Country Council," and Shirali Akhundov became his deputy. Following this announcement, a substantial amount of Bolshevik aid was brought to the region. After being defeated by Denikin in the Northern Caucasus, a part of the XI Army was compelled to retreat to Baku. Under Sergo Ordzhonikidze's orders, 200 of them went to Lankaran. Following some other activities, the military forces of the new institution grew to about 5,000 people. However, the Bolshevik authority was not welcomed by the local population, and even the Russian population started to gather around the White army officers. Around the villages of Novo-Qulyayevka and Petropavlovka, the White Army officers successfully organized a 5,000-strong armed unit. On June 15, they held a congress in Prişib and decided to attack Lankaran to overthrow the Soviet authority. Additionally, Azerbaijani-formed units against the Bolshevik rule also resisted. Huseyn Ramazanov organized a unit in Astarabad that launched an attack on the villages of Shahagac and Alekseyevka in May. However, despite the efforts of Ramazanov's partisan unit, the more substantial Bolshevik forces repelled their attack. In June, Ramazanov attacked Astarabad again, and although additional forces were sent to the Bolsheviks from Lankaran during several days of intense fighting, they could not secure a victory and had to retreat. Despite multiple attempts by the Bolsheviks to escape the situation they found themselves in, none of their efforts improved their condition. On June 23, the White army officer Khoshev attacked Lankaran with a force of 500. However, the White army forces were defeated and retreated from Lankaran. Despite their victory, the Bolsheviks suffered considerable losses in battles, and Ulyansev, the President of the Military Revolutionary Council, was killed. In the region, alongside the increasing number of Azerbaijani forces desiring the restoration of the Azerbaijani government, their activities were also expanding. Towards the end of June, a live force led by Malik Yeghanov arrived from Baku and merged with Ramazanov's unit. Small groups led by Huseyn Ali and Rashid Khan also joined another partisan unit led by Ramazanov and Shahvere. Shahvere's units were concentrated in the Zirvand Mountains. In late July, Ramazanov and Shahverə's units attacked Astara, Shahagac, and Alekseyevka. In Astara, 20 Czechs, 10 Mensheviks, and 10 soldiers were killed. In Shahagac, a 15-member Soviet post was eliminated. Another group of partisans encountered 200 Bolshevik infantrymen, 60 cavalrymen, and a mountain artillery battery in Alekseyevka. Bolshevik cavalry blocked the partisans' path to Iran. The activation of the artillery complicated their situation significantly. The active movements of the first division of the Lankaran camp under the command of Armenian Bolsheviks and the Muğan cavalry squadron resulted in the loss of the military initiative for the partisans, forcing them to retreat back towards the border mountains.

==== Overthrow of Bolshevik power ====
On July 5, 1919, a new congress of the White army, Malakan, and other Russians was held in Prisib. The decision was made to clear the region of Bolsheviks. In the latter half of July, the White Army launched a decisive attack on Lankaran. Azerbaijani partisans in the region simultaneously assaulted the Bolsheviks. Ramazanov and Shahverə's units merged, and it was decided in the Military Council to attack the city from three directions. Ramazanov was to attack from the south, Shahvere from the west, and Haji Osman from the east. The Azerbaijani attack succeeded, compelling the Bolsheviks to retreat. Although the Bolsheviks were pressed towards the lighthouse, they were able to resist due to the heavy weapons they had. The remaining part of the city fell into the hands of Azerbaijani partisans. The territory from the northern point of the city to Haji Qurban Street was under Shahvere's control, from the western side of the city to the left bank of the coast was under Ramazanov's control, and from Sutamordob to the right bank of the Lankaran river was under Haji Osman's control. The Azerbaijani partisans were resolute in continuing the assault due to the consistent support they received. However, the Bolsheviks knew they would ultimately be defeated and thus decided to head to the Sari island. However, when they were evacuating the city, they decided not to give these places to the Azerbaijanis, but to the Russians, even if they were White army. Thus, on July 24–25, Mughan's forces, that is the White army, were released in various significant locations within the city, and all captured officers were set free.

==== The re-establishment of the White army power and the struggle of Azerbaijanis ====
The White army convened their new congress in Prishib, and according to the decision, the decisions made at the congress called by the Soviets in May are considered null and void, and it transfers its powers to the current congress. After being released from prison, Ilyashevich took over the leadership again and the first actions he took were against the Azerbaijani partisans. In the letter he sent to Yusif Bey, the head of one of the partisan groups, he stated that the Bolshevik government had already been overthrown, that his armed group was no longer needed in the region, therefore, he had to leave Russian Astara within 12 hours, otherwise he would attack. Yusif Bey said in his answer that he does not recognize any other government except the Azerbaijani government, and therefore, he will not lay down his arms.

=== AXC intervention in the events ===
The government in Baku was carefully monitoring what was happening and appointed Malik-Yeganov as a temporary representative. Malik-Yeganov did not come to Lankaran, but to Astara. Ilyashevich, who believed that he could easily defeat the armed Azerbaijanis in the region due to his belief in his own forces, decided to change his decision after hearing the news of the arrival of representatives of official Baku to the region. He sent a new letter to Yusif Bey. In the letter, he was surprised that the representative of Azerbaijan had come to the region, and stated that the issue of Muga's integration with Azerbaijan should be considered at the Paris peace conference. He said that the new representative should come to Lankaran and show a document confirming his authority, if this happens, his safety will be ensured, and discussions about the fate of the region will be started. Along with Malik-Yeganov, Azerbaijani military units were also sent to Astara. The negotiations took several days. The Guards tried to prolong the negotiations and hoped that the British would intervene and defend them.[9] The British reached their demands to the supporters of Ilyashevich. It was stated in that request:

According to the agreement accepted by the representatives of the Allied Powers and Admiral Kolchak in Paris, the British government decides that the Muğan province and Lankaran district, as territories within Azerbaijan's borders, should be administered by the governing authorities of that republic, and these territories should fall under that administration. The British government, which aims to uphold the legal actions of the Azerbaijan Republic striving for lawful governance in Lenkoran and Muğan, sends its special commission to assist in establishing the necessary governing bodies that consider the interests of the Russian population in the region.

The support from the British for Azerbaijan caused confusion among the Bolsheviks, but they were not considering handing over control easily. In their responses, they mentioned that this matter would be discussed in the next council. As the council consisted entirely of Russians, what decision would be reached was not without dispute. Additionally, by firing at Azerbaijani forces daily, they aimed to secure more favorable terms for themselves in the negotiations.

=== An attack attempt by the White Army ===
On the night of August 10, 1919, the White Army attacked. Initially of the attack, the White Army, who made some progress, were defeated and sent a message to the British delegation, stating that they agreed to recognize the government of Azerbaijan.During the council held on August 11, they declared their affiliation with the ADR (Azerbaijan Democratic Republic). However, their hope of not considering themselves as part of Russia seemed to remain unbroken despite the decision made.

Considering ourselves as a part of Great Russia and not losing our Russian inclination, the legal authority of Azerbaijan over the Mughan and Lankaran region should be recognized, and until this issue is resolved in the All-Russian Assembly of Enterprises, it should be accepted that it be temporarily incorporated into the Republic of Azerbaijan on the basis of conditions that do not humiliate the honor of Russia and the Russian people.

The representatives of the British, and Azerbaijan's governing bodies convened to discuss the terms under which the region would transition to Azerbaijani control. According to the agreement, both sides were to withdraw from August 11, with the British overseeing how the agreement was carried out by monitoring the battle positions. From August 13 onwards, Lankaran was to come under Azerbaijani control. It was decided that initially, a small military force would accompany government representatives to the city, taking possession of property and administrative buildings. On August 12, a group of soldiers and officers set out for the city. Despite heavy rain, the local population gathered to welcome Azerbaijani representatives. The people chanted "Long live Azerbaijan" and "Long live our soldiers and officers" as they awaited the Azerbaijani representatives. A formal reception was held near the mosque. The officials praised the cautious actions of Azerbaijan's government representatives and the military units in the region, expressing their gratitude. The interim representative, addressing the crowd, emphasized the necessity of restoring the rule of law in the region and highlighted the determination of Azerbaijani soldiers, saying, "We must either liberate Lankaran or die."

== Reasons for military action ==
On the same day, Malik-Yeganov signed an appeal to the people of Lankaran:

I declare martial law in Lankaran district after full law and order and tranquility have been restored. In this regard, it is allowed:

1. Engage in strong propaganda work of the Republic of Azerbaijan;

2. Unauthorized carrying of weapons and walking around the city with weapons,

3. Finding the price of goods for primary demand.

4. Unnecessary firing that violates the peaceful car of citizens;

5. Walking around the city in a drunken state;

6. Walking around town after 10pm,

7. Selling stolen goods. All technical items in the public should be monitored by the competent authorities.

The white army commanders, despite being compelled to surrender authority, held significant military strength. Their forces comprised experienced officers and powerful heavy-armored vehicles. Removing this army would pose a perpetual threat to the ADR. Considering their potential, the Aghvardiyachi troops could create a dangerous situation for Azerbaijan from three sides – the north, south, and sea. The threat from Denikin in the north was a very real concern, and it was highly probable that unrest would commence in the south. Taking all these factors into account, the ADR decided to deploy its own forces to the region.

== Preparations for operation ==
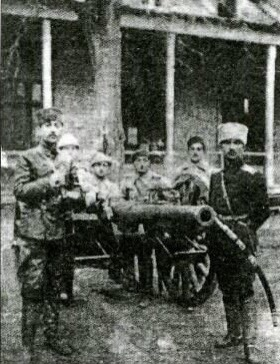
Azerbaijani soldiers from Salimov's detachment during the Lankaran operation, August 1919

ADR's Ministry of Defense had received orders to prepare its troops when the region was still under Bolshevik occupation. As circumstances changed, the ADR planned to discuss a military solution alongside consultations with the British, sending special representatives to the region. In July, the Ministry of Defense was instructed to prepare for a military campaign. In a letter to the head of the Council of Ministers on July 7, 1919, Minister Samed bey Mehmandarov conveyed his views. He mentioned the impossibility of deploying troops to Lankaran due to active Armenian actions in Karabakh. He did not consider it feasible to move the army from Karabakh to Lankaran under the current circumstances. Mehmandarov emphasized the undesirable consequences of moving the forces stationed in Khachmaz to the south and highlighted that withdrawing the army from Ganja would leave Ganja defenseless. He also highlighted the problem of insufficiently equipped armies in the regions. Mehmandarov believed that sending troops to Lankaran might be possible within a month. He had planned to deploy the following units: an infantry regiment, a cavalry squadron, a light battery, a howitzer battery, a mountain artillery battery, two armored cars, and two airplanes. According to the archives obtained by Suleymanov, Mehmandarov had invited Mahammad Amin Rasulzade to the consultation regarding the Lankaran events. This meeting took place on July 5, 1919, in Baku. Simultaneously, detailed reconnaissance operations were conducted to understand the forces controlled by the Bolsheviks in Lankaran. These intelligence-gathering efforts provided detailed information about Bolshevik force locations, military capabilities, terrain specifics, demographic composition of villages along the movement routes, dominant elevations, and other relevant details. Despite planning to send the army there in August 1919, as of July 23, Mehmandarov had already signed an appeal to the residents of Lankaran district.

Citizens! By the will of the government of the Republic of Azerbaijan, I am sending a detachment to Lankaran district. This group is tasked with putting an end to the civil war once and for all, creating order, and freeing you from the violent gangs and murderers who are tormenting the civilian population.

The Azerbaijani troops, who have a fair attitude towards all the nationalities settled in the region, which is an integral part of Azerbaijan, come to you as the bearer of legality.

Under the auspices of the armed forces, civilian administration bodies will be restored immediately in the management of all areas of the country. I am sure that you, as the future full-fledged citizens of the Republic of Azerbaijan, are in the interest of establishing a solid foundation for peaceful coexistence, and you will help the representatives of the government of the Republic of Azerbaijan with your benevolent attitude to restore law and order in the country and fulfill all the legal orders of the government at a voluntary speed.

At the same time, I declare that the creation of soviets, committees or any arbitrary organization under the name of "Mugan Republic" will not be allowed.

Only the authority of the Republic of Azerbaijan should be recognized in the Lankaran region, and those who disobey its instructions will be prosecuted as insurgents under the laws of the war period.

By the order of the leader of the group, the population must hand over the weapons. Whoever does not comply with this will be sent to the Military Desert Court.

I warn that I will not allow any kind of cruelty and robbery against the Russian population, because I consider them as citizens of the Republic of Azerbaijan, as well as representatives of other nationalities living in the region.

While guaranteeing the identity and inviolability of the Russian population, I also demand that they comply with the laws issued by the local authorities.

Any armed resistance would be punishable by death, and in such cases the troops were ordered to be ruthless.

In this regard, I also warn those who intend to show violence against the army and the authorities under these and other pretexts.

I also ordered the detachment commander to take measures to ensure that the troops do not pose any danger to the population and that those who show any violence against the civilian population should be severely punished.

The original of the petition was prepared in Russian, translated into Azerbaijani Turkish by Chief of Staff Sulkevich and given to the head of the Special Lankaran Branch, Habib Bey Salimov, to distribute it among the local population when he went to the region. In August, the Lankaran detachment was already formed and ready for action. In this regard, on August 4, the military minister signed a corresponding order. By that order, the chief of the General Staff, Major General Habib Bey Salimov, who was entrusted with the command of the detachment, was instructed to move with the units included in the detachment to the Lankaran cone along the route of Hajigabul, Salyan, Pokrovsk, Prishib and Lankaran and establish peace there. It was assumed that the total number of the gang would be 3.5 thousand people. In the order, the feed, number, etc., to be given to the animals for this number of personnel. was determined. Apparently, 67 pounds of meat, 197 pounds of bread, 55 pounds of vegetables per day for 3.5 thousand people. 10 pounds of salt, 6.5 pounds of sugar, 18.25 pounds of tea, 250 pounds of barley and 250 pounds of hay for 1000 head of horses. In total, 335 pounds of food and 500 pounds of animal feed were to be consumed during the day. 42 carts were required to transport these loads. The parts were to be supplied not from the stocks in their warehouses, but from the supplies department of the Ministry of War. Since meat cannot be stored for a long time in hot weather, it was planned to provide meat animals to the team. Bread was planned to be baked in Hajigabul, Salyan and Pukrovsk. The Cavalry Division was also supposed to help bring the parts and property included in the squad to Hajigabul. In this regard, the leadership of the Military Ministry gave the appropriate instruction to the commander of the cavalry division.

According to the order signed by General Suleyman bey Sulkevich, the Lankaran detachment was supposed to gather in Haciqabul on August 12 and move towards Salyan on August 13. The headquarters of the Lankaran detachment had already been established, and its activities were managed by the headquarters. Podpolkovnik Ehsan khan Nakhchivansky was appointed as the head of the headquarters. The documentation of the detachment's activities was carried out, and daily combat orders were signed. Although not all combat orders have been preserved, the remaining documents in the archives provide a glimpse into the overall picture of the detachment's activities and movements. The units and divisions entering the Lankaran detachment assembled in Haciqabul on August 12. On that day, preparations for the military campaign were conducted in all units and divisions, orders were clarified, and necessary consultations for coordinating mutual activities were held. However, as indicated in the available documents, the detachment could not embark on its journey on August 13, as originally planned. From the existing documents, it is evident that the gathering of units and divisions that formed the Lankaran detachment in Haciqabul continued until the morning of August 13. On the same day (August 13), a parade was held at the assembly point of the units and divisions entering the Lankaran detachment. The parade was attended by a large number of local residents and was received by General Habib Bey Salimov. According to the newspapers, the units and divisions forming the detachment had quickly formed into a cohesive and skilled collective within a short period, demonstrating high agility and expertise. This brought great joy to the commander of the detachment, General H. Salimov.

The first combat order for the detachment was signed on August 13. The order outlined the tasks, composition, movement time, movement rules, and other relevant matters for the detachment. The detachment included the 5th Baku Infantry Regiment, the 3rd Shaki Cavalry Regiment, the 2nd Light Artillery, the 6th Mountain Artillery, and separate howitzer batteries, engineering company, and armored vehicle company.

The combat order restricted the army from drinking untreated water from areas where malaria was prevalent. Additionally, the consumption of berries, fruits, and other items that could facilitate the spread of malaria was limited. The detachment was equipped with boiled water, and everyone was provided with tea before the movement. According to General Salimov's directive, units and divisions were required to adhere to movement regulations, maintain distance between each other, and refrain from changing their positions. The units and divisions, as per the Desert Regulations, were to be stationed according to daily distances and ensure the detachment's protection.

Respectful treatment towards the local population, regardless of their national or religious identities, and compliance with local laws and regulations were ordered for all army divisions.

== Operation initiation and progress ==
On August 15, the army units arrived in Salyan. Due to the fatigue along the way, Salimov declared August 16 as a day of rest. Salimov sent his representative to the Azerbaijani Guard or possibly the Russian Mujahideen upon arriving in Salyan, inviting them to act through peaceful means. At the same time, Salimov gave orders for the dissemination of Mehmandarov's petition among the residents of the Lankaran district. On August 14, as the Lankaran detachment began its movement, Mehmandarov sent a telegram to Səlimov, ordering the return of the light artillery battery to Baku. He stated the change in the situation, demanding the prompt return of the troops to Baku due to the circumstances and mentioning that the detachment should start heading back one day after reaching Lankaran. To maintain order in Lankaran, a force of 600 soldiers needed to be retained. Once a supportive camp was organized with locals in Lankaran, this force also had to return to Baku.

Anton Denikin's Volunteer Army posed a threat that urged the Lankaran army to swiftly fulfill its orders and return. The situation in Karabakh was also becoming complex, with no temporary agreement reached with the Karabakh Armenians. Additionally, in Shamakhi, the Malakan Russians were showing resistance to the authorities. Consequently, the regional chief of Shamakhi requested the dispatch of troops, specifically the Shaki cavalry regiment, to disarm and remove the Malakans from the center. Taking all this into account, Mehmandarov requested Salimov to send all the artillery and powerful weapons first to Haciqabul, and then to Ganja.

So, although the Cossack Russians had agreed to come under control for a while before the operation began, their full integration had not been possible yet. On August 17, the Lankaran detachment set off from Salyan. At 4 in the morning, the 3rd Shaki Cavalry Regiment, the 6th mountain artillery battery, and an armored car hit the road. Thirty minutes later, the 5th Baku Infantry Regiment, howitzer batteries, and other units began their movement. The plan was for the detachment to spend the evening of August 17 at the Shorsulu-Ramazanli area. In his final telegram sent to General Salimov on August 14, Mehmandarov reminded about the issue of collecting all kinds of weapons among the Russian population. The local population claimed that there was no mention of disarmament in the agreement obtained by Colonel Ilyashevich and the representative of the Azerbaijani government with the participation of the British command, and they feared that if the Russian population surrendered all their weapons, they would be defenseless against raids by existing armed groups in the region. In a letter sent to the center, Salimov inquired about which of the two directives sent from Baku to follow, stating that the Russians in Lankaran claimed there was no disarmament clause in the agreement reached. They asked for guidance on how to proceed. In response, the Chief of Headquarters stated in a telegram to him that on August 11, the Russians had made a dual decision against the Azerbaijani government after their own assembly, hence all their weapons needed to be seized.

On August 18, the army continued its movement. According to the combat order signed by Səlimov and the Chief of Headquarters, Ehsan Khan Nakhchivanski, the army was supposed to cover 18 versts that day. The Sheki Cavalry Regiment took the lead to ensure the safety of the road and were instructed not to enter any village without orders. At crossroads, guards were to be posted, and the supply wagons and accompanying groups were to move in a predetermined sequence. Upon reaching the rest area, the V Infantry Regiment was to secure the perimeter of the encampment, and no civilian was to be allowed outside after dusk.

On August 19, the detachment was already in Pokrovsk. The 20th was declared a rest day. Along the way, the Lankaran detachment not only moved forward but also collected weapons from the Russian villages on the route. On August 17 and 18, the detachment obtained 3 cannons and 5 machine guns from the Russian villages and sent them on the road to Baku. By the 19th, these weapons had already reached Baku. In a telegram sent on the same day, Mehmandarov urged Salimov to take more decisive action to maintain the state's influence and ensure the detachment's maximum swift return to Baku. In another telegram sent on the same day, the minister informed Səlimov that there was no agreement between the state and the temporary Russian settlers, emphasizing that those resisting the collection of arms had no valid grounds. He ordered for Colonel Ilyashevich and his son to be arrested and sent to Baku if they continued to oppose Azerbaijan's demands.

The detachment was supposed to move towards Prishib on August 21. The vanguard section of the detachment would be commanded by Khosrov Mirza Qajar, a prince from the Qajar dynasty. It included one company from the V Baku infantry regiment, 4 cannons from the VI artillery battery, a platoon from the III Shaki cavalry regiment, and a vehicle from the armored car squadron. The vanguard was scheduled to set out at 4 am in the direction of Prishib-Nikolayevsk, with plans to send an advance unit forward, leaving Prishib 3 verst behind. The infantry units were to take frontline positions, while cavalry would be stationed in their rear, and the cannons were to be placed on hills 4 verst from Prishib. In accordance with additional orders from the detachment commander, as the vanguard continued forward, they were to reach and halt near Ahmadli village, cross the river near Ahmadli, and stop on the southern side of the road leading to Nikolayevka, sending guard detachments to the north and northwest of Ahmadli. The main forces of the detachment, led by Colonel Israfilov, were to start their movement half an hour later, at 4:30 am, and reach the camp near Ahmadli village by the end of the day. One platoon from the V Baku infantry regiment was designated to form the rear guard of the detachment. This rear guard was to commence movement at 5 am and follow after all the carts.

Historian Mehman Suleymanov acknowledges the difficulty in determining the amount of arms collected from the population in this region. However, it is known that in Prishib, they gathered 105 horses and 101 livestock. On the 22nd, they were set to depart from Ahmadli, cover a distance of 27 versts, and establish a camp near Gumbashi station along the road leading to Lankaran. On the same day, Staff-Rotmistr Agalarov was appointed as the commander of Prishib. His tasks involved accounting for the collected arms, ammunition, and other military supplies from the locals and then sending them to Salyan under guard. On August 23, the detachment arrived in Lənkəran, greeted with immense joy and excitement by the local population. Rest was provided to the units on August 24 and 25. On August 26, they started moving towards the Yeddi Oymaq village, reaching Astrakhanka on the 28th and Bilasuvar on the 26th. In Bilasuvar, they seized 6 cannons and various much-needed equipment from the locals.

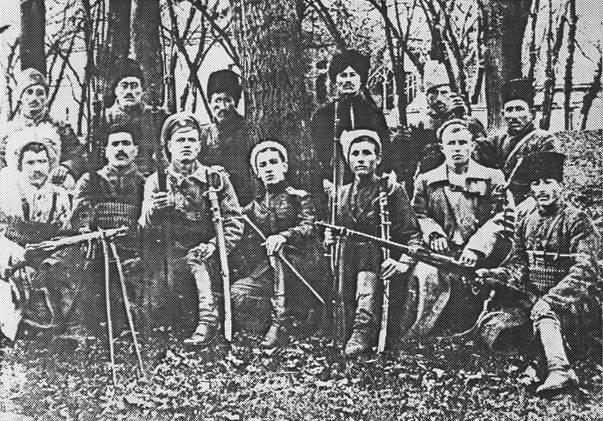
Lieutenant Khoshev's detachment (center), consisting of Mughan soldiers and allied Azerbaijanis, late 1918

== Conculasion ==
Towards the end of August, the Lankaran detachment successfully fulfilled all the assigned tasks. The detachment completely disarmed the armed group led by Colonel Ilyashevich without encountering any particular armed resistance from the Russian population in the region. This action eliminated the threat to Azerbaijan's independence in the southern part of the republic. During the disarmament, 22 cannons were confiscated from the locals and Russian military forces, of which 20 were in fully operational condition, and 2 were dismantled. Additionally, 25 fully operational machine guns and 7 non-operational machine guns were seized. Alongside the arms mentioned earlier, during the activities of the Lənkəran detachment in the southern region, 517 Berdan rifles, 93 Turkish rifles, 382 hunting rifles, 289 various firearms, 36 bayonets, 670 English cartridges, 12454 Berdan cartridges, 26 field bombs, 3 airplane bombs, 15 swords, and 40 daggers were also collected from the Mughan forces and Russian population. All the collected weapons and ammunition were to be handed over to the auxiliary unit formed in Lankaran. On September 3, 1919, after fulfilling the assigned combat order, the Lankaran detachment returned to Hajıgabul. On the same day, the commander of the detachment, Major General Salimov, and the chief of the detachment's headquarters, Ehsan Khan Nakhchivanski, signed the final combat order numbered 23.The assigned task for the Lankaran detachment was quite challenging. The detachment, consisting of a personal contingent of 2500 individuals and eight cannons, was tasked to collect all arms and supplies from the Russian-speaking population of Mughan that could potentially allow the formation of an army of up to 8000 individuals and six cannon batteries. The detachment successfully accomplished this mission without resorting to any coercion on the local and Russian residents, mainly through demanding ultimatums for the surrender of a significant amount of arms and equipment. Apart from cannons and machine guns, they gathered up to four thousand rounds of ammunition, three cargo vehicles, 209 service horses, and various other military equipment from the local population. The inventory included motorcycles, telephone apparatus, and reserve parts for cannons and machine guns. The detachment covered a distance of 425 verst (1 verst = 1.07 kilometers) during the fulfillment of its assigned mission. Even former soldiers from the Russian army noted the strong discipline and order within the Azerbaijani Army, comparing it to the times of Napoleon. Finally, General Salimov expressed gratitude individually to each fighter. Specifically, he thanked Podpolkovnik Israfilov, commander of the V Baku infantry regiment, Polkovnik Khosrov Mirza Qajar, commander of the III Shaki regiment, Podpolkovnik Tarkhanov, commander of the VI mountain artillery battery, Podpolkovnik Ehsan xan Nakhchıvansky, the detachment's chief, Bulatova, the medical officer, and Khan Talıshınsky, the logistics chief. Furthermore, the issue of removing all members of the former regime from the country's borders was raised by the Ministry of Defense before the government.

Two days after Lankaran operation towards the end of October 1919, is illuminated through correspondence conducted between the Minister of War, Samad bey Mehmandarov, and the South Russian Armed Forces Commander-in-Chief's representative in Azerbaijan. It is evident from this exchange that none of the Russian officers in Mughan remained there; they had all left the republic and their visits were also subject to the permission of the Azerbaijan Central Executive Committee (ADR).

In the first half of September 1919, Mehmandarov himself traveled to Lankaran. By witnessing the activities of the Lankaran detachment and becoming familiar with the situation in the region, upon his return to Baku, he signed Order No. 420 dated September 19, 1919, concerning the results of the Lankaran detachment's operations. The second paragraph of the order stated:

Lankaran city's capture, the restoration of law and order in that region, and the affirmation of the Azerbaijani government's authority required the deployment of a special detachment under my command to Lankaran, led by Major General Salimov, the General Headquarters Chief. This force consisted of three branches of the military. Covering the challenging distance of 430 versts from Hacıqabul to Lankaran, our young and resilient army accomplished this feat within 15 days, demonstrating immense strength even without any sick or lagging individuals. Throughout the expedition, the detachment maintained discipline, ensuring no breach of order and no harm to any local residents. Along the way, the city and village inhabitants commended the respectful conduct of the detachment's officers and soldiers. This was reaffirmed during my personal visit after the detachment had left Lənkəran. I witnessed firsthand the impressive demeanor and exemplary discipline of the entire detachment during my visit after their departure from Lənkəran. This efficient and disciplined unit, with its rich military knowledge, returned Lankaran district and Muğan to our beloved Azerbaijan, pacified the suffering population from oppression and anarchy, and ensured peace and security without shedding a drop of blood. These successful outcomes of the expedition, primarily owing to the organized movement and thoughtful consideration of the detachment leader, Major General Hebib bey Selimov, merit my sincere appreciation. I extend my gratitude to the heads of the units within the detachment, all officers, and the medical team for their diligence, ensuring strict adherence to regulations during travel and rest stops. I extend my heartfelt "thank you" to the young soldiers who displayed themselves as courageous and honorable fighters during Azerbaijan's first military campaign.

== Losses ==
According to Suleymanov's report, there is no information regarding anyone being martyred during the operations. However, the English journalist Scottlan Liddell, in one of his articles from Baku, described the burial ceremony of 9 soldiers who were reportedly martyred in the battles around Lənkəran. The author mentioned their deaths in combat against the Bolsheviks. It can be deduced that these 9 martyrs might have fallen not during the Lənkəran operation but earlier, in clashes with the Bolsheviks.

Last Monday, I witnessed a completely different funeral in Baku. 9 Azerbaijani soldiers were killed near Lankaran. The military operation against the Bolsheviks was the first combat activity of the young Azerbaijani Army. The corpses of 9 soldiers were brought to Baku by sea and a grand funeral ceremony was organized for them. Rarely have I witnessed such a massive scene. Representatives of all ministries and public organizations of Azerbaijan were in the long line of those following the coffins. Distinguished people and several thousand soldiers with their rifles turned down lined up behind 9 coffins carried by Azerbaijanis on their shoulders. The streets were surrounded by people and soldiers.

== See also ==
- Habib Bey Salimov
- Islamic Army of the Caucasus
- Azerbaijan Democratic Republic
