= Pokrov =

Pokrov may refer to:

- Pokrov, Ukraine, a town in Ukraine
- Pokrov (Russian) or Pokrova (Ukrainian), name for the Intercession of the Theotokos, one of the Orthodox feasts
- Pokrov Urban Settlement, a municipal formation into which the town of Pokrov in Pokrovsky District of Vladimir Oblast is incorporated
- Pokrov, Russia, several inhabited localities in Russia
  - Corrective colony No. 2, Vladimir Oblast, located in Pokrov, Vladimir Oblast.
- Pokrov Cemetery, a cemetery in Riga, Latvia

== See also ==
- Pokrovka (disambiguation)
- Pokrovsky (disambiguation)
- Novopokrovka (disambiguation)
