= Pokrovka, Azerbaijan =

Pokrovka, Azerbaijan may refer to:

- Pokrovka, Jalilabad, Azerbaijan
- Pokrovka, Sabirabad, Azerbaijan
