= Şorsulu =

Şorsulu or Shorsulu or Shorsuli or Shorsuly may refer to:

- Şorsulu, Gobustan, Azerbaijan
- Şorsulu, Salyan, Azerbaijan
