= Mughan clashes =

Confrontation between Russian Whites, Bolsheviks and Azerbaijani forces in Mugan

- Part of Southern Front of the Russian Civil War
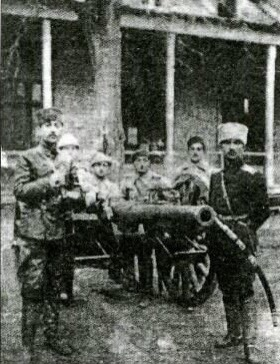
- Azerbaijani soldiers from Salimov's detachment during the Lankaran operation, August 1919
Date	March 1918–August 1919
Location	Lenkoran uezd, Javad uezd and Baku Governorate
Result	Azerbaijani victory
Territorial changes	Mughan invaded by Azerbaijan

Belligerents
(Azerbaijan Democratic Republic) Azerbaijan	(Russian Empire) White Movement; (Russian Empire) Mughan Territorial Administration	Bolsheviks; Mughan Soviet Republic

Commanders and leaders
(Azerbaijan Democratic Republic) Samad bey Mehmandarov (Azerbaijan Democratic Republic) Habib Bey Salimov (Azerbaijan Democratic Republic) Javad bey Malik-Yeganov	(Russian Empire) Colonel Ilyashevich (Russian Empire) Dmitry Kropotov † (Russian Empire) Colonel Avetisov † (Russian Empire) Boris Khoshev (Russian Empire) Colonel Ermolaev †	Timofei Ulyancev †; Ivan Kolomicev (executed); Iliya Orlov; Grigory Arustamov

Strength
Lenkoran troops: 5th Baku Infantry Regiment; 3rd Shaki cavalry Regiment Muslim partisans: ~800–1,000 partisans	Anti-Bolshevik troops of Lieutenant Khoshev, June 1919: About 5,000	May 1919: ~5,000–6,000 including Cavalry

The Mughan clashes (Azerbaijani: Muğan hadisələri) or Mugan events (Russian: Муганские события, romanized: Muganskie sobytiia) were a confrontation between Russian Whites, Bolsheviks and Azerbaijani forces in Mugan during March 1918 to August 1919, in the context of the Russian Civil War. As a result, the Mugan Soviet Republic became part of the Azerbaijan Democratic Republic.

== Historiography ==
According to historians O. M. Morozova and T. F. Yermolenko, this historical episode rarely attracts the attention of scholars; the events are used more in political interests related to modern ethnic conflicts. The small amount of documentary evidence preserved to date has led to distortions and baseless interpretations. In the third volume of the Soviet publication History of Azerbaijan (1963), the chronology of events was not established, the assessment of political forces was ideological. For modern researchers of the White Army (White Guard) (VE Shambarov), the Mugan events are an example of popular anti-Bolshevik resistance, while Azerbaijani authors interpret them as a movement against the territorial integrity of Azerbaijan. In the monograph Chaos and Ethnos. Ethnic Conflicts in Russia, 1917-1918: Conditions of Origin, Chronicle, Commentary, Analysis (2011), Russian historian V.P. Buldakov demonstrated the importance of ethnic conflict in the escalation of violence.

== Background ==
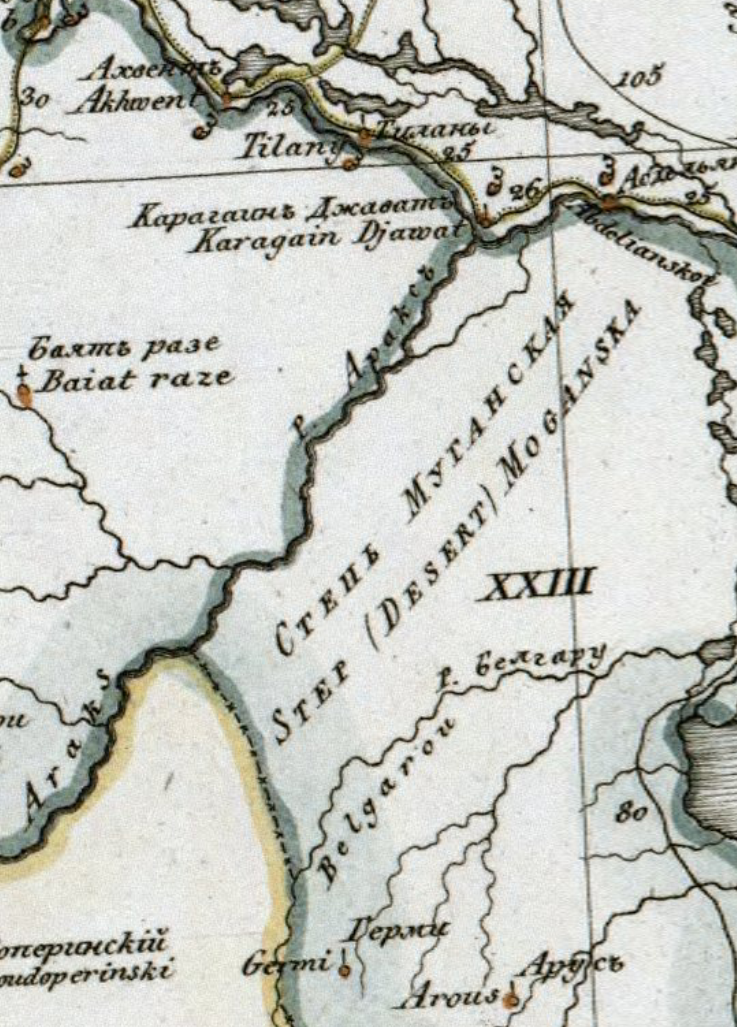
Mughan steppe on a 1918 map

The Mugan Plain is located between the lower reaches of the Kura and Araz and the foothills of the Talysh Mountains. Before the revolution, it occupied part of Javad and Lankaran districts of Baku province.

The local population of the region was represented by Azerbaijanis (often called Turks or Tatars in the sources) and Talysh. Azerbaijanis were divided into sedentary populations and nomads (Shahsevens). According to Russian historian Olga Morozova, local Shiites turned to the Persians and Sunni Muslims to the Turkish sultan.

Mugan was one of the places where the migration policy of the Russian Empire spread. After the annexation of the region to Russia under the terms of the Treaty of Gulistan, many nomads and settlers from the north joined the Ottoman Empire. They were replaced by Armenians, Germans, and Greeks. The villages of Privolnoye (Jalilabad) and Goytapa (Prishib) in the Mugan Plain were among the first Russian villages to appear in the Caucasus in the 1830s.

The resettlement of the Russians to Mugan, according to various sources, took place during the reign of Nicholas II, among whom were Subbotniks, Dukhoborchevs, Staroobryadchevs, Malorussovs, and others. The number of Russian settlements in Mugan increased from 48 to 55, the highest. The Russians also lived in the city of Lankaran, the center of Lankaran District. Documents from 1913 show that 20,000 of the 150,000 Russians in the Caucasus live in Mugan. In Russian-language sources, the Russian population of Mugan is described as Mugans.

Soviet writer B. Talibli wrote that the division of the region's population into conflict groups was facilitated by religious and ethnic differences, migration processes (migration and resettlement of nomads). According to Talbli, sectarians in exile in Russia have become an element of government protection - the detention of Russian immigrants has led to clashes with the local population. OM Morozova and TF Yermolenko, referring to Talibli's attitude to the latest issue, claim that despite the fact that the Tsarist government was interested in the Russification of Mugan, it tried to take into account the interests of all residents of the region. However, according to Morozova and Yermolenko, the population was dissatisfied with the tsarist policy due to the failure of local authorities and the lack of special measures.

90 years before the Russian Civil War, the lands settled by the Shahsevens, a group of nomadic Azerbaijanis, were divided according to the Treaty of Turkmenchay, which ended the Russo-Persian War (1826–1828). As a result, the winter pastures of the Shahsevens remained in the territory of Persia, and the summer pastures remained in the territory of the Russian Empire. Beginning in 1830, the Persian government paid for the Shahsevans to cross into Russian territory, but the villages where the wealthy were relocated were frequently raided, and in 1884 they were banned from crossing the border. However, the Shahsevens did not recognize borders and sometimes continued to migrate in their traditional ways, attacking Russian and Azerbaijani villages. According to Morozova, a similar situation existed in Karabakh and Gazakh; the construction of Armenian villages on the routes of nomads caused conflicts. In addition, serfdom in the Caucasus was not abolished until 1912, and no recall and demarcation procedures were carried out. According to Morozova, national-religious and social conflicts intensified after the February Revolution.

== Overview of the Mughan clashes ==
After the October Revolution and the collapse of the Caucasus Front, anarchy arose in Mugan in the south of the present-day Republic of Azerbaijan. Ethnic tensions between the local population and the Russians who settled in the region during the Russian Empire turned into military operations. Many Russian border guards who refused to leave the region also came to the aid of Russian immigrants known as Mugans.

The period of ethnic clashes ended only in April 1918, after the establishment of Soviet power by parts of the Baku commune, and there were attempts at reconciliation. However, Soviet rule did not last long, and a few months after the collapse of the Baku Commune, a puppet government of the Russian White Forces was formed in Mugan: the Provisional Military Dictatorship of Mughan. Nevertheless, the situation in the region remained on the brink of anarchy, the government's authority was weak, and in April 1919, Soviet power in the region was re-established in the form of the Mugan Soviet Republic (MSR). The refusal of Tsarist army officers to recognize the new Soviet government and the arrest of Colonel Ilyashevich, one of the leaders of the previous governments, led to a war between whites and reds in Mugan. At the same time, a large-scale revolt of Azerbaijanis and Talysh against the MSR began, which was aided by regular Azerbaijani army units.

In 1919, the Ministry of War of Azerbaijan decided to gradually abolish the Mugan Soviet Republic. In mid-July, they launched an attack from Salyan and Astara. On July 23, Minister of War Samad bey Mehmandarov addressed the residents of Lankaran district. He stated in his appeal that "with the consent of the Republic of Azerbaijan, I am sending troops to Lankaran to end the civil war, restore stability and save you from the aggressors."

It was noted in the appeal that the Lankaran district would recognize only the government of the Republic of Azerbaijan. The Bolsheviks had to fight on several fronts at the same time. In Astara, paratroopers landed with the help of local residents. An alternative congress against the Soviet government was held in the village of Astrakhanka. On the morning of July 28, the Bolsheviks had to leave Lankaran. Otradnev, the commander of the troops, was killed in the fighting. A decision was made to evacuate Sarah Island. Individual groups attacked. As a result, a strange situation has arisen in the region. The locals could not decide who to obey. However, Soviet rule in the region came to an end. They were able to stay on Sarah Island for two weeks. The local population was subordinated to the Azerbaijani government.

== Aftermath ==
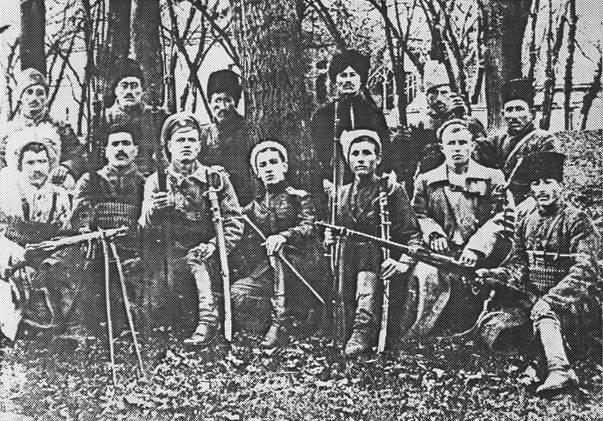
Lieutenant Khoshev's detachment of Mugan soldiers and allied Azerbaijanis (center), end of 1918.

After the events in Mugan, the southern districts of Baku province finally became part of Azerbaijan, but instability prevailed in the region for a long time. In early January 1920, Garrison Adjutant Hashimov reported from Lankaran to the General Staff of the Azerbaijani Army that the situation in Lankaran and Mugan was calm; but "there is an increase in the Bolshevik organization of the villages of Privolnoye (Jalilabad), Grigorevka (Sharan), Otrubintsi, which are in the center of attention due to the recent successes of the Bolsheviks among the population of Mugan." In 1919, during the Salimov campaign, Hashimov recommended disarming villages that had escaped disarmament. In early March 1920, the commissioner of the Lankaran district, Bahram khan Nakhchivanski, reported on the strong Bolshevik propaganda, the presence of large sums of money in the propagandists, and the good armament of the struggling villages; He called for the immediate strengthening of military presence in the region and the disarmament of pro-Bolshevik villages.

On April 28, as a result of the April occupation (Baku operation), the Azerbaijan Democratic Republic collapsed. A few days later, Soviet power was established in Lankaran and Mugan; The Revolutionary Military Council was established. Soon (already in late May), an armed opposition of the Soviet regime emerged in Lankaran district. According to Mehman Süleymanov, the Soviet government disrespected local traditions and customs and mass demands under the pretext of class struggle because the Muslim population did not understand Soviet policy. Long-running Muslim guerrilla groups in the region, many of them organized by the organizers and leaders of the Astara uprising during the Mugan events, were led by former Turkish corporal Yusuf Jamal Pasha, Shahveran, Hussein Alikhan, and others. At the same time, armed groups appeared in Javan district in northern Mugan. The armed resistance, known as the Lankaran Uprisings, was suppressed only in October 1921, but, as Mehman Süleymanov noted, protests against Soviet rule in the region continued for many years.

== Sources ==
- Gusejnov, A.A.; Sinitsyn, V.M. (1979). Сражающаяся Мугань [Battling Mugan'] (in Russian). Baku: Azerbaijani State Publishing House.
- Morozova, Olga; Ermolenko, Tatiana (2013). Погоны и Буденовки: Гражданская война глазами белых офицеров и красноармейцев [Pogonovs and Budyonovki: The Civil War through the eyes of White officers and Red Army soldiers] (in Russian). Moscow: Russian Humanities Research Foundation. p. 356.
- Morozova, Olga M. (2015). "Mugan Region in 1918–1919" (PDF). Russkaya Starina (in Russian). 13 (1). Academic Publishing House Researcher: 46–61. doi:10.13187/rs.2015.13.46.
- Süleymanov, Mehman (2018). Azərbaycan Ordusunun tarixi. 3 (1920–1922) [History of the Azerbaijani Army. Volume 3 (1920–1922)] (in Azerbaijani). Baku: Maarif. p. 784.
- Volkova, N. G. (1969). Кавказский этнографический сборник. Этнические процессы в Закавказье в XIX—XX вв [Caucasian Ethnographic Collection. Ethnic Processes in Transcaucasia in the 19th and 20th Centuries] (in Russian). Vol. 4. Moscow: USSR Academy of Sciences Publishing House.
