= Pokrovka =

Pokrovka may refer to:

- Pokrovka, Russia, the name of multiple localities
- Pokrovka, Kyrgyzstan, a village in Talas Province
- Bolshaya Pokrovskaya Street, the main street in Nizhny Novgorod, Russia
- Pokrovka, Donetsk Oblast, an urban-type settlement in Ukraine
- Pokrovka, Mykolaiv Raion, Mykolaiv Oblast, a village in Ukraine
- Pokrovka, Sumy Oblast, a village in Ukraine

== Places formerly known as Pokrovka ==
- Kuybyshev, Armenia, a town in Lori Province
- Günəşli, Jalilabad, Azerbaijan, a village in the Jalilabad Rayon
- Qaratəpə, Sabirabad, Azerbaijan, a village in the Sabirabad Rayon
- Kyzyl-Suu, Kyrgyzstan, a village in the Issyk Kul Province
- Chuy, Kyrgyzstan, a village in the Chuy Province

== See also ==
- Pokrov (disambiguation)
- Pokrovsky (disambiguation)
- Pocrovca
