= Pokrovsk (disambiguation) =

Pokrovsk is a city in Donetsk Oblast, Ukraine.

Pokrovsk may also refer to:

== Places ==
- Pokrovsk, Sakha Republic, a town in Khangalassky District, Sakha, Russia
- Pokrovsk, former name of Engels, Saratov Oblast, Russia
- Pokrovsk, Kaluga Oblast, a village in Kozelsky District, Kaluga Oblast, Russia
- Pokrovsk, Mari El, a village in Sovetsky District, Mari El, Russia
- Pokrovsk, Mordovia, a village in Kovylkinsky District, Mordovia, Russia

== See also ==
- Pokrovske (disambiguation)
- Pokrovsky (disambiguation)
