= Pokrov, Russia =

Pokrov (Russian: Покров) is the name of several inhabited localities in Russia.

== Kaluga Oblast ==
As of 2010, six rural localities in Kaluga Oblast bear this name:

- Pokrov, Babyninsky District, Kaluga Oblast, a village in Babyninsky District
- Pokrov (Sovkhoz Chkalovsky Rural Settlement), Dzerzhinsky District, Kaluga Oblast, a village in Dzerzhinsky District; municipally, a part of Sovkhoz Chkalovsky Rural Settlement of that district
- Pokrov (Ugorskaya Rural Settlement), Dzerzhinsky District, Kaluga Oblast, a village in Dzerzhinsky District; municipally, a part of Ugorskaya Rural Settlement of that district
- Pokrov, Kirovsky District, Kaluga Oblast, a village in Kirovsky District
- Pokrov, Meshchovsky District, Kaluga Oblast, a selo in Meshchovsky District
- Pokrov, Zhukovsky District, Kaluga Oblast, a selo in Zhukovsky District

== Kostroma Oblast ==
As of 2010, one rural locality in Kostroma Oblast bears this name:

- Pokrov, Kostroma Oblast, a selo in Lapshinskoye Settlement of Vokhomsky District

== Moscow Oblast ==
As of 2010, five rural localities in Moscow Oblast bear this name:

- Pokrov, Chekhovsky District, Moscow Oblast, a village in Stremilovskoye Rural Settlement of Chekhovsky District
- Pokrov, Klinsky District, Moscow Oblast, a village under the administrative jurisdiction of the town of Klin, Klinsky District
- Pokrov, Podolsky District, Moscow Oblast, a selo in Strelkovskoye Rural Settlement of Podolsky District
- Pokrov, Ruzsky District, Moscow Oblast, a village in Ivanovskoye Rural Settlement of Ruzsky District
- Pokrov, Solnechnogorsky District, Moscow Oblast, a village in Lunevskoye Rural Settlement of Solnechnogorsky District

== Nizhny Novgorod Oblast ==
As of 2010, three rural localities in Nizhny Novgorod Oblast bear this name:

- Pokrov, Gaginsky District, Nizhny Novgorod Oblast, a selo in Pokrovsky Selsoviet of Gaginsky District
- Pokrov, Knyagininsky District, Nizhny Novgorod Oblast, a selo in Vozrozhdensky Selsoviet of Knyagininsky District
- Pokrov, Navashinsky District, Nizhny Novgorod Oblast, a village in Bolsheokulovsky Selsoviet of Navashinsky District

== Novgorod Oblast ==
As of 2010, one rural locality in Novgorod Oblast bears this name:

- Pokrov, Novgorod Oblast, a village in Polnovskoye Settlement of Demyansky District

== Smolensk Oblast ==
As of 2010, two rural localities in Smolensk Oblast bear this name:

- Pokrov, Gagarinsky District, Smolensk Oblast, a village in Pokrovskoye Rural Settlement of Gagarinsky District
- Pokrov, Vyazemsky District, Smolensk Oblast, a village in Kaydakovskoye Rural Settlement of Vyazemsky District

== Tver Oblast ==
As of 2010, five rural localities in Tver Oblast bear this name:

- Pokrov, Maksatikhinsky District, Tver Oblast, a village in Maksatikhinsky District
- Pokrov (Molokovskoye Rural Settlement), Molokovsky District, Tver Oblast, a village in Molokovsky District; municipally, a part of Molokovskoye Rural Settlement of that district
- Pokrov (Akhmatovskoye Rural Settlement), Molokovsky District, Tver Oblast, a village in Molokovsky District; municipally, a part of Akhmatovskoye Rural Settlement of that district
- Pokrov, Oleninsky District, Tver Oblast, a village in Oleninsky District
- Pokrov, Zubtsovsky District, Tver Oblast, a village in Zubtsovsky District

== Vladimir Oblast ==
As of 2010, two inhabited localities in Vladimir Oblast bear this name:

- Pokrov, Vladimir Oblast, a town in Petushinsky District
- Pokrov, Alexandrovsky District, Vladimir Oblast, a rural locality (a village) in Alexandrovsky District

== Vologda Oblast ==
As of 2010, one rural locality in Vologda Oblast bears this name:

- Pokrov, Vologda Oblast, a selo in Abakanovsky Selsoviet of Cherepovetsky District

== Yaroslavl Oblast ==
As of 2010, five rural localities in Yaroslavl Oblast bear this name:

- Pokrov, Fedurinsky Rural Okrug, Danilovsky District, Yaroslavl Oblast, a village in Fedurinsky Rural Okrug of Danilovsky District
- Pokrov, Pokrovsky Rural Okrug, Danilovsky District, Yaroslavl Oblast, a selo in Pokrovsky Rural Okrug of Danilovsky District
- Pokrov, Lyubimsky District, Yaroslavl Oblast, a selo in Pokrovsky Rural Okrug of Lyubimsky District
- Pokrov, Rostovsky District, Yaroslavl Oblast, a village in Itlarsky Rural Okrug of Rostovsky District
- Pokrov, Rybinsky District, Yaroslavl Oblast, a selo in Pokrovsky Rural Okrug of Rybinsky District
