= Habib Bey Salimov =

Azerbaijani military commander

Habib Bey Salimov Həbib bəy Səlimov
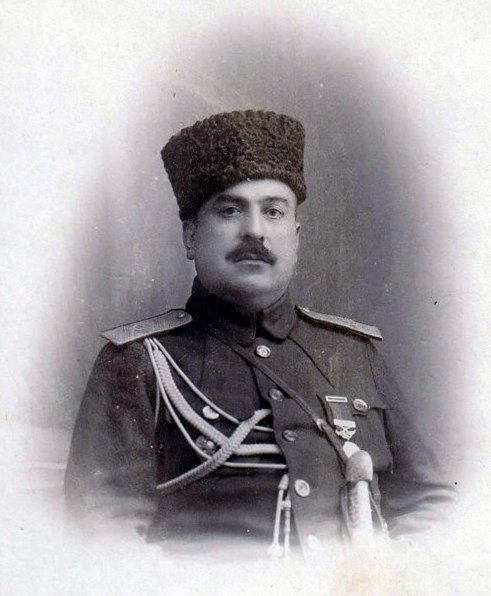

Chief of General Staff of Azerbaijani Armed Forces
- In office August 1, 1918 – December 30, 1920
- Preceded by: Office established
- Succeeded by: Lieutenant General; Mammad Bey Shulkevich

Personal details
- Born: February 8, 1881 Erivan (Yerevan), Erivan uezd, Erivan Governorate, Russian Empire
- Died: December 30, 1920 (aged 39) Baku, Azerbaijani SSR, USSR
- Awards: Imtiaz Medal

Military service
- Branch/service: Azerbaijani National Army
- Years of service: 1900 – 1920
- Rank: Major General
- Battles/wars: Russian Civil War; Mughan clashes; Armenian–Azerbaijani War; Battle of Goychay; Battle of Kurdamir; Lankaran operation

Habib bey Haji Yusif oglu Salimov (Azerbaijani: Həbib bəy Səlimov Hacı Yusif oğlu; February 8, 1881 – December 30, 1920) was the first Chief of General Staff of Azerbaijani Armed Forces of the Azerbaijan Democratic Republic.

== Early life ==
Salimov was born and completed school in Erivan (Yerevan) where his father worked as a judge of the Erivan Governorate. On August 12, 1900 he volunteered to serve in the 39th division of the 156th Elisabethpol regiment of the Russian Imperial Army's Caucasus corps. After completing his studies at a military school in Tiflis, Salimov served in the 3rd Caucasus battalion in Julfa and was a part of a reconnaissance mission in Tehran. As a second lieutenant of the 5th Caucasus battalion, he was conferred with the Order of St. Vladimir of 4th degree and on August 9, 1912 he was promoted to Stabskapitän. In the midst of World War I, Salimov was conferred with Order of Saint Stanislaus of the 3rd degree for "excellence in the activities against the enemy".

== Service in Azerbaijani Army ==
He graduated from Imperial Nicholas Military Academy of the Russian Empire on March 4, 1918. After the establishment of the Azerbaijan Democratic Republic, Colonel Salimov returned to Azerbaijan and was appointed Chief of Documentation Department of the Azerbaijani Army. In mid-1918, Salimov's professionalism was noticed by General Nuri Pasha of Army of Islam, who appointed him Chief of Staff of the Azerbaijani corps. Salimov was subsequently charged with leading the Azerbaijani units towards Baku along the Ganja-Baku Railway. Having liberated terminals at Nəvai, Atbulaq and Ələt by August 1, 1918, he marched towards Baku. For his service in the liberation of Baku on September 15, 1918 Habib Bey Salimov was promoted to General Major on February 23, 1919 by Minister of Defense Samad bey Mehmandarov according to Order No. 30. Salimov was the second high-ranking general of newly established Azerbaijani Army after Mammad Bey Shulkevich. During the Armenian uprising in Karabakh on March 22, 1920 led by Dashnaks Dali Kazar (Kazarov) and Drastamat Kanayan, Salimov was charged to lead a 20 thousand-strong expedition to put down the rebellion. The force led by Salimov included the 3rd Ganja, 5th Baku, 1st Javanshir, 4th Quba and 8th Agdam regiments. Azerbaijani counterattack started on April 3 and after 12 days of fighting, control over Karabakh was restored by Azerbaijani forces. Dali Kazar was killed and General Kanayan fled Karabakh. On August 1, 1918 with the formal establishment of the Ministry of Defense of Azerbaijan, Habib Bey Salimov was appointed Chief of General Staff of Azerbaijani Armed Forces.

After occupation of Azerbaijan by Bolsheviks, Salimov was appointed Military Commissar to Nakhchivan. However, Salimov refused to work with Bolsheviks and was arrested on September 1, 1920. On December 30, 1920 he was executed by firing squad.

== See also ==
- Azerbaijani Army
- Ministers of Defense of Azerbaijan Republic
