= Chetvert, Vladimir Oblast =

Chetvert Четверть
- Village
- Location within Vladimir Oblast Location within Russia
- Coordinates: 56°28′N 39°10′E
- Country: Russia
- Region: Vladimir Oblast
- District: Alexandrovsky District
- Time zone: UTC+3:00

Chetvert (Russian: Четверть) is a rural locality (a village) in Andreyevskoye Rural Settlement, Alexandrovsky District, Vladimir Oblast, Russia. The population was 58 as of 2010.

== Geography ==
Chetvert is located 33 kilometres (21 mi) northeast of Alexandrov (the district's administrative centre) by road. Pokrov is the nearest rural locality.
