= Pokrovske =

Pokrovske (Ukrainian: Покровське) may refer to several places in Ukraine:

== Chernihiv Oblast ==
- Pokrovske, Mena Raion, village in Mena Raion
- Pokrovske, Semenivka Raion, village in Semenivka Raion

== Dnipropetrovsk Oblast ==
- Pokrovske (urban-type settlement), urban-type settlement and administrative center of Pokrovske Raion
- Pokrovske, Nikopol Raion, Dnipropetrovsk Oblast, village in Nikopol Raion

== Donetsk Oblast ==
- Pokrovske, Bakhmut Raion, Donetsk Oblast, village in Bakhmut Raion
- Pokrovske, Mariupol Raion, Donetsk Oblast, village in Mariupol Raion

== Kharkiv Oblast ==
- Pokrovske, Balakliia Raion, selyshche in Pryshyb village council, Balakliia Raion

== Kyiv Oblast ==
- Pokrovske, Kyiv Oblast, village in Brovary Raion

== Kirovohrad Oblast ==
- Pokrovske, Haivoron Raion, village in Haivoron Raion
- Pokrovske, Kirovohrad Raion, village in Kirovohrad Raion

== Luhansk Oblast ==
- Pokrovske, Luhansk Oblast, village in Troitske Raion

== Mykolaiv Oblast ==
- Pokrovske, Mykolaiv Raion, Mykolaiv Oblast, village in Mykolaiv Raion
- Pokrovske, Snihurivka Raion, village in Snihurivka Raion

== Poltava Oblast ==
- Pokrovske, Lubny Raion, village in Lubny Raion
- Pokrovske, Zinkiv Raion, village in Zinkiv Raion

== Sumy Oblast ==
- Pokrovske, Sumy Oblast, village in Krolevets Raion

== Zhytomyr Oblast ==
- Pokrovske, Zhytomyr Oblast, village in Olevsk Raion

== See also ==
- Pokrovsk
- Pokrovsky (disambiguation)
