= Battle of Kurdamir =

Battle in 1918 in the Caucasus that the Ottoman–Azerbaijani forces won

- Part of the Armenian–Azerbaijani war during the Caucasus campaign of World War I and Southern Front of the Russian Civil War
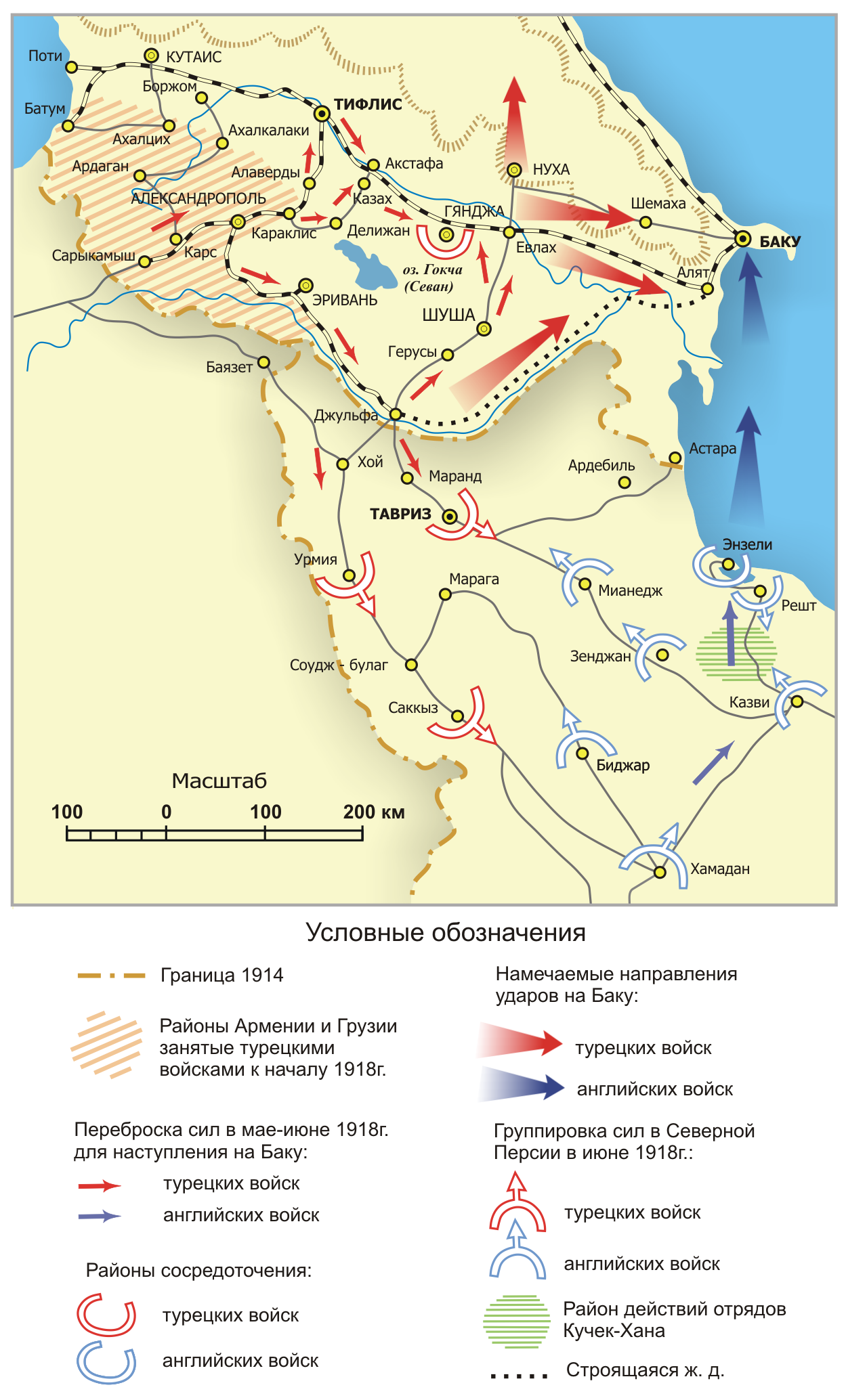
- Offensive actions of Ottoman troops in the South Caucasus in 1918.
Date	7 July – 10 July 1918 (3 days)
Location	Kurdamir, Baku Governorate, Azerbaijan Democratic Republic 40°20′18″N 48°09′39″E
Result	Central Powers victory
Territorial changes	Ottoman–Azerbaijani coalition forces capture Kurdamir

Belligerents
Central Powers: Ottoman Empire (Azerbaijan Democratic Republic) Azerbaijan	Allied Powers: Baku Commune (Russian Soviet Federative Socialist Republic) Russian SFSR White movement

Commanders and leaders
(Ottoman Empire) Mürsel Pasha (Azerbaijan Democratic Republic) Habib Bey Salimov	Stepan Shaumian; Lazar Bicherakhov

Battle of Kurdamir took place between the coalition Turkish troops and Azerbaijani armed forces against the troops of the Baku Council of People's Commissars led by Stepan Shaumyan for the control over Kurdamir settlement from July 5 to 10, 1918.

During the battle, the Mususlu detachment under the leadership of Lieutenant Colonel Habib bey Salimov, a detachment consisting of Hasan Bey's 46th Infantry Battalion and a subsequent cavalry regiment and additional forces involved in strengthening the front, and the 1st Brigade of the Red Army on the enemy side, newly arrived from Iran. Bicherakhov's team and sections of the school of instructors were present. The enemy's military forces consisted mainly of Dashnak-Armenian officers and soldiers who were brought to Baku from the First World War (1914-18) and committed genocide against the Azerbaijani people. The small number of Turkish-Azerbaijani troops and the more favorable positions of the Bolshevik-Dashnak troops allowed the Reds to prevent the Mususlu detachment and Hasan Bey's detachment in the early days, and even to advance a little towards Agsu.

In order to prevent the expansion of the attacks of the Bolshevik-Dashnak forces, the 13th Infantry Regiment of the 5th Caucasus Division was directed around Kurdamir. The regiment had to join Hasan Bey's detachment and attack Kurdamir from the north. Azerbaijani volunteers gathered in Aghdash and Khaldan settlements to strengthen the forces in Mususlu, as well as 350 unarmed volunteers brought to Gazakh were sent to Bargushad station.

On July 8, heavy fighting broke out. Although the main blow to the enemy was supposed to be struck by the 13th Regiment, the situation was complicated by the fact that the Red Army sent a large force here. Bicherakhov had a force against the 13th Regiment with 8 cannons and 8 machine guns. The fighting lasted into the night, and the 13th Regiment, facing serious resistance, spent the night of June 8 between the villages of Ibrahimbeyli and Garasaggal. The activity of the Mususlu detachment did not significantly change the positions on the front during the day. The skillful use of the armored train and the surrounding landscape greatly increased the enemy's resistance.

On July 9 and 10, fighting resumed around Kurdamir. During the fighting, which began on the night of the 10th of the month, a detachment was sent to the station of Kerrar to destroy the railway line behind the enemy and make it difficult to retreat. After completing the task, the 13th Regiment launched a successful attack. Seeing the escalation of the situation, the Red Army Command strengthened the Bolshevik-Dashnak forces in the north of Kurdamir. As a result, there was a serious threat on the right wing of the 13th Regiment. However, on the one hand, the selflessness of the regiments, on the other hand, the sending of aid from the division allowed to prevent the Bolshevik-Dashnak forces. A group of 350 people brought from Gazakh to Bargusha also armed and joined the 13th Regiment. At that time, H. Salimov's Mususlu detachment skillfully used the weakening of the enemy forces and managed to break through his line of defense.

Despite all their efforts, the Bolshevik-Dashnak forces were unable to prevent the attack of the 13th Regiment. Towards evening, the right flank of the regiment and the left flank of the Mususlu detachment merged to the west of Kurdamir. A few hours later, the combined forces completely liberated the settlement from the enemy. The liberation of Kurdamir further strengthened the military initiative in the hands of Turkish-Azerbaijani troops.
