= Provisional Military Dictatorship of Mughan =

1918-1919 British-allied anti-Soviet dictatorship in Azerbaijan

Provisional Military Dictatorship of Mughan (1918) Mughan Territorial Administration (1918–1919)
- 1918–1919
- Left: Flag of the White movement Right: Union Jack

- Location of Lankaran District
- Capital: Goytepe
- Common languages: Russian; Azerbaijani; Talysh
- Government: Military dictatorship
- Leader
  - 1918: T. P. Sukhorukov
- Historical era: Russian Civil War
  - Established: 1 August 1918
  - Reorganized as Mughan Territorial Administration: December 1918
  - Disestablished: 25 April 1919
Succeeded by
Mughan Soviet Republic
- Today part of: Azerbaijan

The Provisional Military Dictatorship of Mughan was a short-lived anti-communist entity established in the Lankaran region (present-day Azerbaijan) in August 1918 amid the Mughan clashes. It was aligned with White Russian forces and supported by the British military force in Baku known as Dunsterforce.

The Mughan government did not support the independence of Azerbaijan and was led by the former Imperial Russian Army colonel T. P. Sukhorukov, who initially acted under the protection of the Dunsterforce. Mughan declared to be an autonomous part of "single and indivisible Russia". In December 1918, it was reorganized as the Mughan Territorial Administration. On 25 April 1919, pro-Bolshevik workers in Lankaran overthrew the Mughan Territorial Administration. On 15 May the Extraordinary Congress of the "Councils of Workers' and Peasants' Deputies" of Lankaran district proclaimed the Mughan Soviet Republic.
