= 21st Infantry Division (Russian Empire) =

- 21-я пехотная дивизия
- Active: 1914–1918
- Country: Russian Empire
- Branch: Russian Imperial Army
- Role: Infantry

The 21st Infantry Division (Russian: 21-я пехо́тная диви́зия, 21-ya Pekhotnaya Diviziya) was an infantry formation of the Russian Imperial Army.

== Organization ==
- 1st Brigade
  - 81st His Imperial Highness Grand Duke George Mikhailovich's Apsheron Infantry Regiment
  - 82nd His Imperial Highness Grand Duke Nicholas Mikhailovich's Dagestan Infantry Regiment
- 2nd Brigade
  - 83rd Samur Infantry Regiment
  - 84th Shirvan Infantry Regiment
- 21st Artillery Brigade

== Commanders ==
- 1826-1828: Georgiy Evseevich Eristov
- 1865-1868: Ivan Davidovich Lazarev
- 1868-1871: Fyodor Radetzky
- 1913-1914: Samad bey Mehmandarov
- 1915: Mikhail Kvetsinsky

== Chiefs of Staff ==
- 1856-1858: Fyodor Radetzky

== Commanders of the 2nd Brigade ==
- March–September 1908: Konstantin Lukich Gilchevsky
