= Georgiy Evseevich Eristov =

19th century Georgian nobleman

Duke, Prince, General Georgiy Evseevich Eristov
- Born: 1769; Russian Empire
- Died: 3 November 1863 (aged 93–94); Gori, Georgia, Russian Empire
- Military career
- Allegiance: Russian Empire
- Service years: 1802−1863
- Rank: General of the infantry
- Units: Infantry, Grenadiers
- Commands: 21st Infantry Division
- Conflicts: Caucasus War; Russo-Persian War; Russo-Turkish War

Duke Georgiy Evseevich Eristov (Eristavi) (Georgian: გეორგი ევეევიჩი ერისტოვი (ერისთავი) Eristavi Russian: Георгий Евсеевич Эристов; (1769 – 18 November 1863) was a nobleman of the Georgian Eristavi princerely family and general as well as senator of the Russian Empire.

== Awards ==
Order of Saint Alexander Nevsky
Three times Order of Saint Anna

- 1st Grade with Diamonds
- 1st Grade
- 2nd Grade

Order of Saint Vladimir

- 2nd Grade
- 4th Grade

Order of Saint George

- 4th Grade
