= Şorsulu, Gobustan =

Şorsulu
- Location within Azerbaijan
- Coordinates: 40°28′N 48°57′E
- Country: Azerbaijan
- Rayon: Gobustan
- Time zone: UTC+4 (AZT)
  - Summer (DST): UTC+5 (AZT)

Şorsulu (also, Shorsulu) is a village in the Gobustan Rayon of Azerbaijan.
