= Novopokrovka, Russia =

Novopokrovka (Russian: Новопокро́вка) is the name of several inhabited localities in Russia:

Urban localities

- Novopokrovka, Tambov Oblast, an urban-type settlement in Tambov Oblast

Rural localities

- Novopokrovka, Primorsky Krai, a selo in Primorsky Krai
- Novopokrovka, Voronezh Oblast, a settlement in Voronezh Oblast
- Novopokrovka, name of several other rural localities
