= Pokrovsky (disambiguation) =

Pokrovsky is a Russian surname.

Pokrovsky, also spelled Pokrovski and Pokrovskii (Russian: Покровский), or Pokrovskaya (feminine; Покровская) is a Slavic last name. Its form in neuter is Pokrovskoye may also refer to:

- Pokrovsky District, a district of Oryol Oblast, Russia
- Pokrovsky, Russia (Pokrovskaya, Pokrovskoye), name of several inhabited localities in Russia
- Pokrovskoye, former name of the village of Qaratəpə, Azerbaijan
- Pokrovsky Cathedral, also known as the Cathedral of St. Basil the Blessed, in Red Square, Moscow
- Pokrovsky Monastery (Moscow), a male monastery in Moscow, Russia
- Pokrovsky Monastery (Suzdal), a female monastery in Suzdal, Russia
- The Pokrovsky Gate, a 1982 Soviet comedy film

== See also ==
- Pokrovsk
- Pokrovsk (disambiguation)
- Novopokrovsky
- Pokrovka (disambiguation)
- Arbatsko-Pokrovskaya line, one of the lines of the Moscow Metro
