= Mughan Soviet Republic =

Short-lived pro-Bolshevik state

Coordinates: 38.7529019°N 48.8503664°E

Mughan Soviet Republic Muğan Sovet Respublikası Муганская Советская Республика
- 1919–1919
- Flag
- Capital: Lankaran
- Common languages: Russian, Azerbaijani, Talysh
- Government: Soviet republic
  - Chairman of the Board: D. D. Chirkin
  - Political Commissar of the Revolutionary Military Council: T.I. Ulyantsev-Otradnev
- Historical era: Russian Civil War
  - Established: 15 May 1919
  - Disestablished: 2 June 1919
Preceded by	Succeeded by
Azerbaijan Democratic Republic; Provisional Military Dictatorship of Mughan	Azerbaijan Democratic Republic

The Mughan Soviet Republic was a short-lived pro-Bolshevik state that existed in present-day southeastern Azerbaijan from March to June 1919. It was proclaimed in opposition to the Azerbaijan Democratic Republic and was supported largely by the region’s ethnic Russian population.

Established in August 1918, the Provisional Military Dictatorship of Mughan, led by the former Imperial Russian Army colonel T. P. Sukhorukov, did not support the independence of Azerbaijan and initially acted under the protection of the British military force in Baku, known as Dunsterforce. Mughan declared to be an autonomous part of "single and indivisible Russia". In December 1918, it was reorganized as the Mughan Territorial Administration. On 25 April 1919, pro-Bolshevik forces deposed the Mughan Territorial Administration. On 15 May the Extraordinary Congress of the "Councils of Workers' and Peasants' Deputies" of Lankaran district proclaimed the Mughan Soviet Republic.

In June 1919, the army of the Azerbaijan Democratic Republic established control over the region, bringing an end to the Mughan Soviet Republic.

== See also ==
- Azerbaijan Democratic Republic
- Provisional Military Dictatorship of Mughan
- Talysh-Mughan Autonomous Republic
