= Pokrov, Vologda Oblast =

Pokrov Покров
- Selo
- Location within Vologda Oblast Location within Russia
- Coordinates: 59°20′N 37°35′E
- Country: Russia
- Region: Vologda Oblast
- District: Cherepovetsky District
- Time zone: UTC+3:00

Pokrov (Russian: Покров) is a rural locality (a selo) in Abakanovskoye Rural Settlement, Cherepovetsky District, Vologda Oblast, Russia. The population was 5 as of 2002. There are 4 streets.

== Geography ==
Pokrov is located 40 km (25 mi) northwest of Cherepovets (the district's administrative centre) by road. Zhdanovskaya is the nearest rural locality.
