= Novopokrovka, Ukraine =

Novopokrovka (Ukrainian: Новопокровка) is the name of several inhabited localities in Ukraine:

Urban localities

- Novopokrovka, Dnipropetrovsk Oblast, an urban-type settlement in Dnipropetrovsk Oblast
- Novopokrovka, Kharkiv Oblast, an urban-type settlement in Kharkiv Oblast

Rural localities

- Novopokrovka, Kirovske Raion, Crimea, a village in Kirovske Raion
- Novopokrovka, Krasnohvardiiske Raion, Crimea, a village in Krasnohvardiiske Raion
- Novopokrovka, Kryvyi Rih Raion, Dnipropetrovsk Oblast, a village in Kryvyi Rih Raion
- Novopokrovka, Lozova Raion, Kharkiv Oblast, a village in Lozova Raion
- Novopokrovka, Kherson Oblast, a village in Henichesk Raion
- Novopokorvka, Kirovohrad Oblast, a village in Kropyvnytskyi Raion
- Novopokrovka, Luhansk Oblast, a village in Svatove Raion
- Novopokrovka, Odesa Oblast, a village in Berezivka Raion
- Novopokrovka, Melitopol Raion, Zaporizhzhia Oblast, a village in Melitopol Raion
- Novopokrovka, Polohy Raion, Zaporizhzhia Oblast, a village in Polohy Raion
