= Samad bey Mehmandarov =

Azerbaijani general (1855-1931)

Samad bey Mehmandarov Səməd bəy Mehmandarov
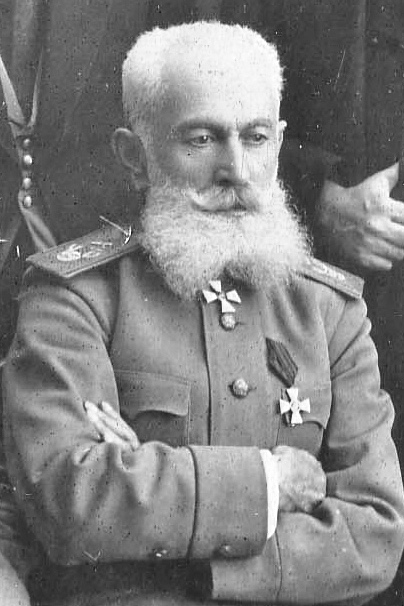
- Samad bey Mehmandarov (1919)
- Born: 16 October 1855; Lankaran, Russian Empire
- Died: 12 February 1931 (aged 75); Baku, Azerbaijan SSR, Soviet Union
- Relatives: Karim bey Mehmandarov
- Military career
- Allegiance: Russian Empire; Azerbaijan Democratic Republic; Soviet Union
- Branch: Imperial Russian Army
- Service years: 1875–1918
- Rank: General of the Artillery
- Commands: Minister of Defense of ADR (25 December 1918 – 1 April 1920)
- Conflicts: Russian conquest of Turkestan; Boxer Rebellion; Russo–Japanese War; World War I; Caucasus campaign; Armenian-Azerbaijani War; Russian Civil War; Mughan clashes; Red Army invasion of Azerbaijan
- Awards: See details
- Other work: Defence Minister for the Azerbaijan Democratic Republic; Defence Advisor to Azerbaijan SSR

Samad bey Sadykh bey oghlu Mehmandarov (Azerbaijani: صمد بگ صادق بگ اوغلی مهمانداروف, Səməd bəy Sadıx bəy oğlu Mehmandarov; 16 October 1855 – 12 February 1931) was an Azerbaijani General of the Artillery in the Russian Imperial Army, a member of the Independence faction of the Parliament of the Azerbaijan Democratic Republic, the Minister of Defense of the Azerbaijan Democratic Republic, and a military figure of the Azerbaijan Soviet Socialist Republic and the Soviet Union.

A participant in the Russo-Japanese War, Mehmandarov commanded an artillery division in the defense of Port Arthur from 1904 to 1905. During World War I, he first led an infantry division and later commanded an army corps. For his service in the Tsarist army, he was awarded various orders and medals, including the 3rd and 4th degrees of the Order of Saint George and a Golden Weapon for Bravery. He was also honored with the Grand Cross of the British Order of St Michael and St George.

Following the declaration of the Azerbaijan Democratic Republic in 1918, Mehmandarov was invited to serve in the Republic’s government. He held the position of Minister of Defense in the third, fourth, and fifth cabinets of the Azerbaijani government. After the Azerbaijan Democratic Republic was occupied by Soviet Russia in 1920, Mehmandarov taught at military schools and worked as a special advisor in the People's Commissariat for Military and Naval Affairs of Azerbaijan. He retired in 1928.

== Active duty ==
=== Early career ===
There are various theories regarding the origin of the Mehmandarov surname. One suggests that it comes from a military and administrative position within the governance structure of the Karabakh Khanate, known as a mehmandar (guest officer). The mehmandar was responsible for receiving and escorting honorary guests visiting the khanate. During the reign of Ibrahim Khalil Khan Javanshir (1762–1806), Mirza Ali Bey held the position of mehmandar. His descendants later adopted the surname Mehmandarov. One branch of the Mehmandarov family eventually settled in Lankaran. Mirza Sadig Bey Mehmandarov, born in Shusha, graduated from the Faculty of Law in Saint Petersburg, where he became acquainted with Haji Mir Abbas Bey Talishinski. Haji Mir Abbas invited him to Lankaran to serve as the chief legal officer of his estate, and later, Mirza Sadig Bey married into the Talishinski family.

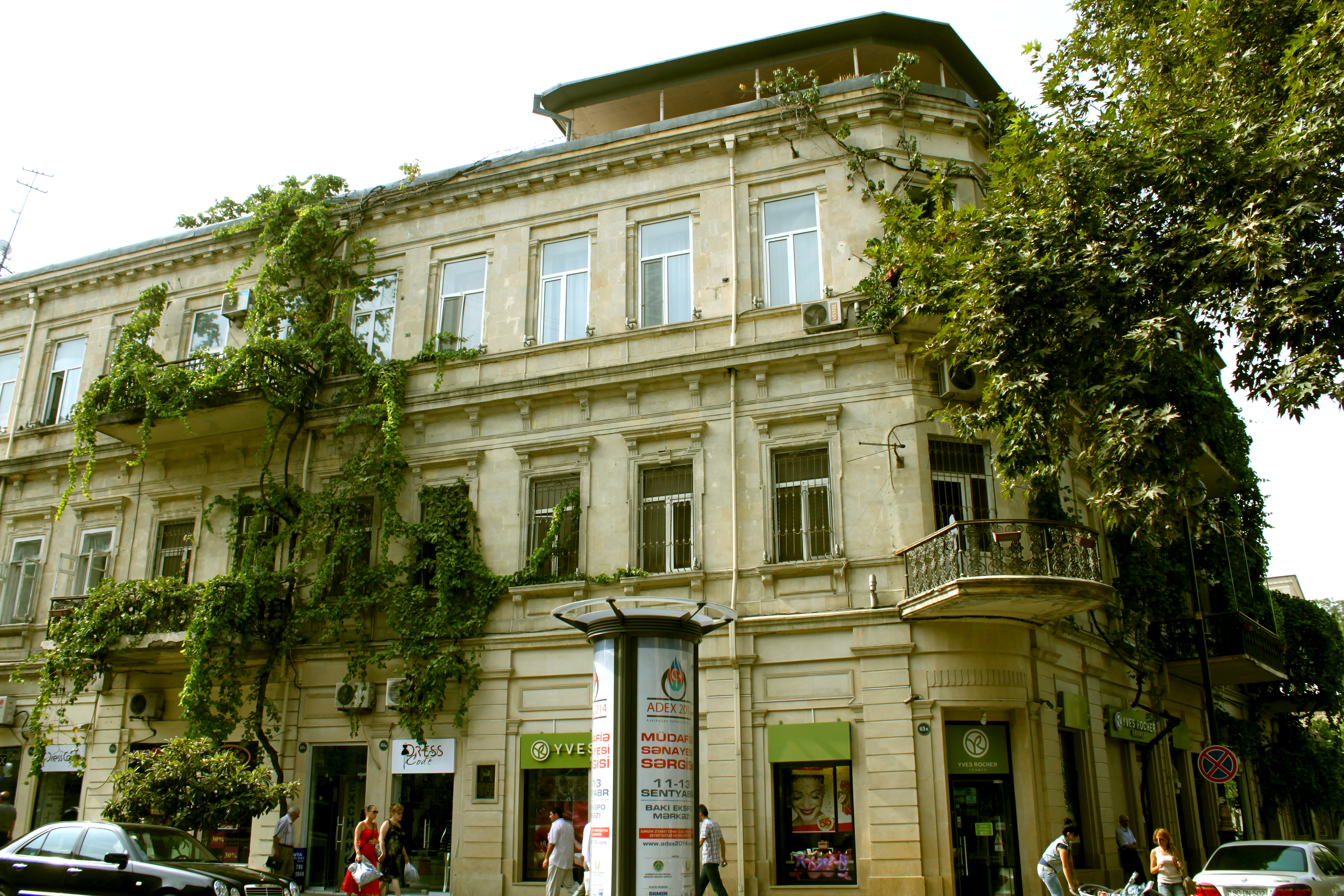
The building where Mehmandarov lived in Baku from 1918 to 1931.

Samad Bey Mehmandarov hailed from a prominent noble family in Karabakh. His father, Mirza Sadiq Bey Mehmandarov, moved from Shusha to Lankaran in the early 1840s due to his official duties. He served as the Mugan district police officer in the Lankaran Uyezd administration and held the rank of titular counselor. Born on October 16, 1855, in Lankaran, Mehmandarov received his primary education at the Baku Gymnasium. On September 1, 1873, he began his military service as a cadet at the 2nd Konstantinov Military School in Saint Petersburg.

After graduating in 1875, Mehmandarov was assigned to the 1st Turkestan Artillery Brigade with the rank of praporshchik. He commanded a mountain unit in the 3rd Battery and took part in the Kokand campaign from November 1875 to February 1876. He was awarded a medal for the conquest of the Khanate of Kokand. For his service during the campaign against the Matcha mountaineers, he was awarded the 3rd Class Order of Saint Stanislaus on October 12, 1876. In December of that year, he was promoted to podporuchik (second lieutenant) and further advanced to poruchik (lieutenant) in December 1877. In the fall of 1879, Mehmandarov was transferred to the 2nd Artillery Brigade in Saint Petersburg. On March 13, 1881, he was awarded the 3rd Class Order of Saint Anna. Later that year, on October 25, he was reassigned to the 2nd Artillery Brigade, and on November 29, 1882, he was promoted to staff captain. On June 17, 1885, he was transferred to the 38th Artillery Brigade in the Caucasus, where he served for the next nine years. From July 8 to November 8, 1887, he was a member of the Caucasus Military District Court. Beginning August 31, 1889, he served as the commander of the 2nd Half-Battery and administrative officer of the 4th Battery. On December 16, 1890, Mehmandarov was promoted to captain. He later received the 2nd Class Order of Saint Stanislaus on May 21, 1891.

On September 30, 1894, the 38th Artillery Brigade was transferred to the Warsaw Military District. Mehmandarov served as a member of the brigade court from November 12, 1894, to February 25, 1895, and as the chairman of the brigade court from February 25, 1895, to March 22, 1896. Between January 22 and June 1, 1896, he temporarily served as a member of the Warsaw Military District. On May 14, 1896, he was awarded the 2nd Class Order of Saint Anna. On July 22 of the same year, he was assigned to the 6th Battery "for his valuable service" and later transferred to the 3rd Battery on November 11, where he was appointed as the administrative officer of the battery. From April 22 to September 26, 1897, Mehmandarov temporarily commanded the 3rd Battery. On January 1, 1898, he was promoted to the rank of lieutenant colonel and appointed commander of the 2nd Battery of the 3rd Rifle Artillery Division. Following the transfer of the 1st Battery to Transbaikal and its renaming to the 2nd Transbaikal Artillery Division, Mehmandarov was reassigned to this unit with his battery on April 17, 1898. On August 23, 1898, he arrived in Nerchinsk, the service location of the division in the Transbaikal region, along with his battery. On September 24, 1899, Mehmandarov was awarded the 4th Class Order of Saint Vladimir.

=== Boxer Rebellion in China (1900–1901) ===
From July 2, 1900, to March 26, 1901, Mehmandarov's battery was assigned to the Zabaykal Artillery Division, serving in a detachment commanded by Major General Paul von Rennenkampf. This deployment was part of the China Relief Expedition, a campaign aimed at suppressing the Boxer Rebellion. According to the memoirs of general Aliagha Shikhlinski, during this campaign, Rennenkampf ordered Mehmandarov to destroy the Chinese troops attempting to escape through the southern gates of the besieged city of Tsitsihar. However, the Chinese soldiers were unarmed as they emerged.

Columns of Chinese troops marched past Mehmandarov, but they were unarmed. When Rennenkampf ordered him to open fire, Mehmandarov refused, stating that he could not shoot at unarmed people. However, he received a follow-up order threatening him with a court-martial if he disobeyed. Mehmandarov fired several shots, but over the heads of the unarmed people. The Chinese immediately retreated back into the city.

For his distinction in the battles against the Chinese, Mehmandarov was promoted to the rank of colonel by the highest decree on January 31, 1901. On August 18 of the same year, under the orders of the commander of the Priamur Military District, he was sent to the city of Hulunbuir, where he assumed command of the units within the Zasunkaria Division. From May 14 to July 17, 1902, he temporarily commanded the Zabaykal Artillery Division. On February 1, 1903, he was appointed to the Officer Artillery School located in Tsarskoye Selo as part of the rotating contingent. During Mehmandarov's absence, Captain Aliagha Shikhlinski temporarily commanded his battery. Upon completing the Officer Artillery School with distinction, Mehmandarov returned to Zabaykalia on October 1, 1903, resuming his leadership of the 2nd Battery. On October 14 of the same year, he was awarded a Golden Weapon for Bravery for "distinction in battles against the Chinese."

=== Russo-Japanese War ===
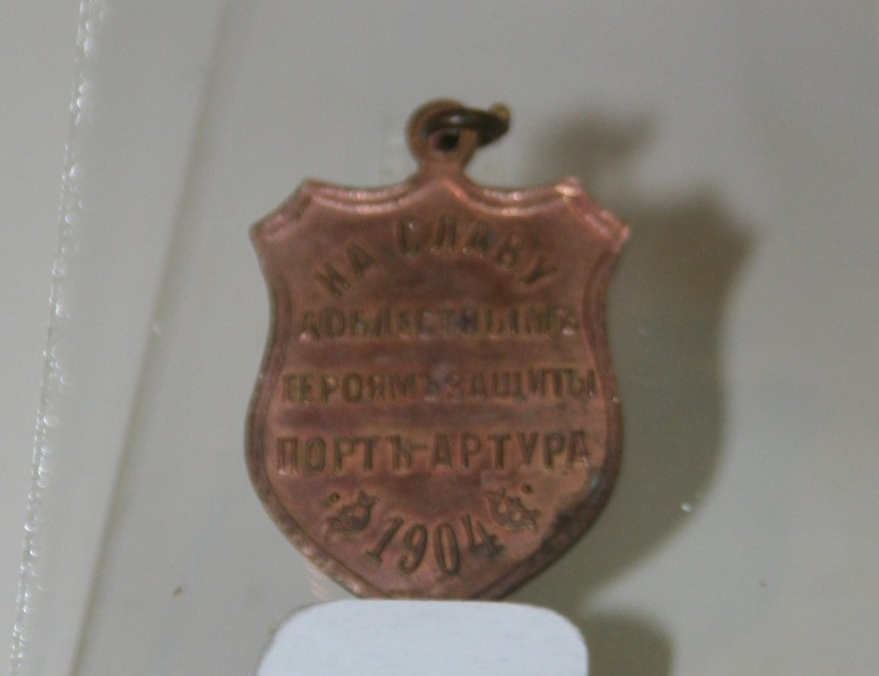
Commemorative medal awarded to Samad bey Mehmandarov for the defense of Port Arthur. It is kept in the Museum of History of Azerbaijan.

In 1904, at the outbreak of the Russo-Japanese War, Samad bey Mehmandarov was forty-eight years old. On the night of January 26, the Japanese attacked the Russian squadron anchored at Port Arthur, setting ablaze the battleships Retvizan and Tsesarevich as well as the cruiser Pallada. The war had begun. The following morning, Samad bey Mehmandarov was appointed commander of the 7th Siberian Rifle Artillery Division by the commander of the ground forces, Major General Roman Kondratenko.

Following the outbreak of the Russo-Japanese War, on February 18, 1904, Mehmandarov was officially assigned as commander of the 7th Eastern Siberian Rifle Artillery Division by imperial decree. His biography prominently features the heroic defense of Port Arthur. During this operation, the land defense line was divided into three fronts. To enhance the management of artillery fire, artillery commanders were appointed to each front, and headquarters were established under their supervision. Colonel Mehmandarov was appointed artillery chief of the Eastern Front, actively participating in the frontlines throughout the defense of Port Arthur. This was considered the most crucial front in the defense, where the Japanese concentrated their strongest forces. The diary of Port Arthur Gazette (Novy Kray) correspondent P. N. Larenko provides insights:

Colonel Mehmandarov (commander of all artillery on the right flank) and Lieutenant Colonel Stolnikov displayed remarkable indifference to personal danger. During bombardments, they walked among the guns, seemingly oblivious to the exploding shells, thus inspiring others. The first, as a Caucasian, was naturally brave; the second, as a devout man, faced fate with calm and selfless acceptance.

On October 13, 1904, during another Japanese assault, Colonel Mehmandarov sustained a concussion while stationed at the Third Redoubt. Larenko’s diary further notes:

From conversations with wounded officers, I learned several details about Colonel Mehmandarov. He is a demanding, courageous man who is strict with his subordinates, insisting on setting a personal example of bravery. As a man of temperament, he expresses himself quite harshly. He values only those who are genuinely proud and capable of heroic deeds, while dismissing careerist officers whose primary concern is saving their own lives and securing undeserved decorations. He despises those who use Tolstoyan ideas of ‘non-resistance to evil’ and ‘do not kill’ to mask cowardice, and he strongly opposes such individuals entering military service.

Aliagha Shikhlinski, recounting Mehmandarov’s fearlessness, wrote:

On October 14, during the shelling of the fortress, Samad bey Mehmandarov came to my position. This position was under fire from Japanese guns ranging from 11-inch artillery to 37-millimeter small naval cannons, as well as rifle and machine gun fire. At that time, a six-inch shell exploded near Mehmandarov, and the black mud thrown into the air splattered onto him. Unfazed and uninjured, Mehmandarov calmly took out a white handkerchief and began wiping the mud off his new coat.

For his exemplary service against the Japanese, Mehmandarov was promoted to the rank of Major General on October 22, 1904. On October 24, 1904, he was awarded the Order of St. George (4th Class) for his valor and courage against the Japanese forces. In early December, the Japanese launched two significant offensives against the fortress. Despite the Russians' determined resistance, the Japanese managed to capture several key forts of the fortress. The second major blow occurred on December 2, when General Roman Kondratenko was killed. General Fok was appointed as his replacement. Sixteen days later, the Japanese captured Dragon Ridge Mountain, which determined the fate of the fortress. The commandant of Port Arthur, General Stessel, convened a military council to discuss surrendering the fortress to the enemy. Some commanders present at the council agreed with Stessel's proposal. However, Major General Mehmandarov, Colonel Semyonov, and a group of other officers vehemently opposed surrender, arguing that they still had the strength to repel the Japanese forces. Nevertheless, after the fortress's surrender on December 20, the entire Russian garrison was taken prisoner. The Japanese offered generals and officers the opportunity to return home on the condition that they refrain from further participation in the war. While many accepted this condition, a group of officers, including Samad bey Mehmandarov, refused, choosing instead to "share the fate of their soldiers". Larenko's diary recounts this moment:

Yesterday, the Japanese artillery commander visited the fortress along with his headquarters and met with Colonel Mehmandarov, who had been promoted to the rank of major general during the siege. They spoke highly of Mehmandarov, stating that the Japanese forces had suffered significant losses during the battles at Port Arthur—approximately 25,000 men—and had lost many weapons. They acknowledged that their success had only been facilitated by the shortage of ammunition on the Russian side. General Mehmandarov was taken into captivity; he was firmly opposed to surrendering and returning "home."

From December 23, 1904, to November 18, 1905, Mehmandarov was held captive in Nagoya. On January 4, 1905, he was awarded the 1st Class Order of Saint Stanislaus for his distinguished service during the battles against the Japanese. He returned from Japanese captivity to Vladivostok on November 20, 1905, aboard the steamboat Tambov. The period he spent in captivity was counted as part of his active service.

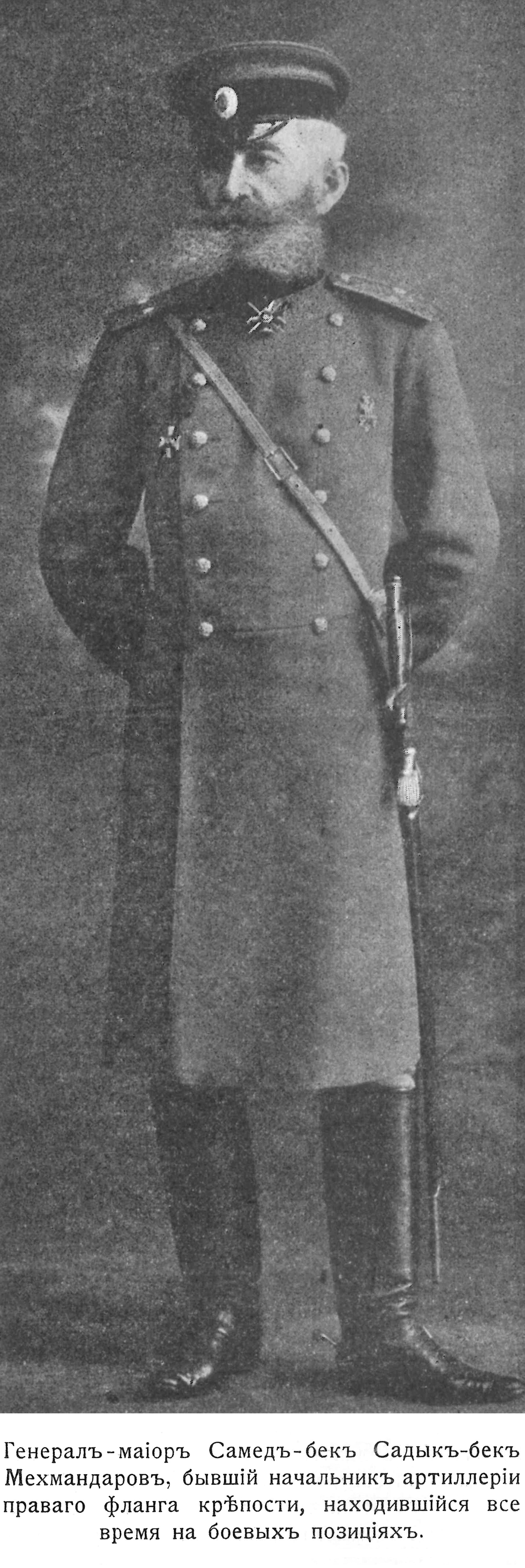
Major general Samad bey Mehmandarov

On December 13, 1905, Mehmandarov was appointed commander of the 75th Artillery Brigade and later of the 7th East Siberian Rifle Artillery Brigade. In February 1906, he was sent to Saint Petersburg to participate in the commission reviewing awards related to the defense of Port Arthur. From July 1906 to July 1907, he served as commander of the 7th East Siberian Infantry Division and as Chief of Artillery of the 3rd Siberian Army Corps. On July 15, 1907, he was officially confirmed as Chief of Artillery of the 3rd Siberian Army Corps.

During his six-month leave in Saint Petersburg starting in September 1907, Mehmandarov was instructed, by order of the Minister of War, to attend sessions of the Supreme Military-Criminal Court concerning the surrender of Port Arthur. On July 13, 1908, he was promoted to the rank of lieutenant general for his distinguished service and was officially confirmed in his position as Chief of Artillery for the 3rd Siberian Army Corps.

On May 24, 1910, he was appointed Inspector of Artillery for the 1st Caucasian Army Corps. Mehmandarov repeatedly served as acting corps commander during this period. On December 6, 1911, he was awarded the 1st Class Order of Saint Anna. Finally, on December 31, 1913, he was appointed commander of the 21st Infantry Division of the 3rd Caucasian Army Corps.

=== World War I ===
When the World War I began, General Mehmandarov was serving in the 3rd Caucasus Army Corps, which had been transferred from the Caucasus to the Warsaw Military District. The 21st Infantry Division under Mehmandarov's command had gained a reputation as one of the best units of the Russian army, with the 81st Infantry Absheron Regiment and the 83rd Infantry Samur Regiment standing out in particular. For his role in the battles of September 27–29, 1914, he was awarded the 3rd Class Order of St. George. The citation for the award stated:

During the battles of Kozienice, under intense enemy fire, with the 2nd Brigade of the division under his command, he crossed the Vistula River and held the left bank for three days, isolated from any support. He repelled multiple attacks by the German Guard Corps, and despite his brigade being subjected to relentless fire from all sides, he led his units in strong bayonet charges and launched an offensive himself.

On December 11, 1914, Lieutenant General Mehmandarov was appointed commander of the 2nd Caucasus Army Corps. In his final order to the 21st Infantry Division on December 10, he wrote:

Honorable 21st Division,

By order of the Supreme Commander, I have been appointed as the Commander of the 2nd Caucasus Army Corps.

With this appointment to such a high and responsible position, I must leave the ranks of your gallant division. As I bid farewell to you, honorable heroes, I address you with my parting words.

For 11 months, particularly during the last 5 months in combat, I have had the privilege of commanding you. During this time, especially in battle, I have come to know you closely.

Your service has been recognized on many occasions and is known throughout Russia. There is no corner of our vast country where our corps, and especially the 21st Division, are not known.

It has been an honor for me to command you, honorable heroes. I leave you with sadness, my dear comrades.

As I bid farewell, I sincerely thank the noble ranks of the division for their dedicated service.

During a German attack, the commander of the Russian Imperial Army's corps, worried about the fate of his units, called to inquire about the situation of Mehmandarov's division. Mehmandarov’s concise reply over the phone was: "The situation is difficult. I am attacking!". At a critical moment when two large army units were retreating, Mehmandarov’s division dealt a significant blow to the rapidly advancing German forces, forcing them to retreat. After three days of intense fighting, the division reached the outskirts of the city of Ivangorod and launched an assault. In the history of the First World War, Mehmandarov's successful operation thwarted German General Mackensen's plans for a rapid offensive. At the same time, Mehmandarov's successful assault saved two retreating Russian armies from the threat of encirclement. During this operation, General Aliagha Shikhlinski held the position of General for Special Assignments under the Chief Inspector of Field Artillery, as appointed by the Supreme Commander. Later, he wrote:

At that time, I was summoned to the Western Front to inspect the state of heavy field artillery, a new weapon in the Russian army, and to guide its operations. I visited seven corps and determined that only in Samed bey Mehmandarov's corps was the role of heavy artillery properly understood and the artillery deployed accordingly. This success was not due to the initiative of the corps artillery inspector, but rather the personal initiative of Mehmandarov himself, a skilled artilleryman.

On January 2, 1915, General Mehmandarov was awarded the 2nd Class Order of St. Vladimir with Swords. On February 14, 1915, he was conferred the Saint George Sword adorned with diamonds:

In the battles on October 9 and 10, 1914, while pursuing the German army, which had been routed near Ivangorod by the corps' troops, and encountering superior Austrian forces coming to their aid in the Polichno-Boguchinski Forest, Mehmandarov halted the enemy's attempt to outflank the corps' combat positions with several bayonet charges and decisive attacks. Personally participating on the front line of battle, he repeatedly risked his life, struck the enemy's flank, and forced them into retreat. On October 11, 12, and 13, 1914, he repelled numerous enemy assaults aimed at encircling their right flank and succeeded in compelling the enemy to retreat urgently across the entire front. On October 11, 1914, in a single day, they captured 1 staff officer, 16 junior officers, and 670 lower-ranked soldiers, as well as seizing one machine gun.

This decoration was extremely rare and, during World War I, was awarded to only eight individuals.

On March 22, 1915, Samad bey Mehmandarov was promoted to the rank of the General of the Artillery. His corps participated in the most intense battles against German forces, including those near Przasnysz, San, Kholm, and Vilnius, as well as in repelling the German offensive aimed at breaking through the front in the Švenčionys region. The 2nd Caucasus Army Corps was reinforced with two additional infantry divisions, forming a unit known as the "Mehmandarov Group." In one of his orders to the group’s troops, General Mehmandarov stated:

I demand steadfast will, courage, determination, flexibility, personal initiative, and thoughtful leadership from all commanding personnel.

All units of the group are instructed to defend their assigned positions to their full capacity and resist with all available means until exhaustion.

Responsibility is placed on unit and division commanders.

Special attention should be given to strengthening discipline and maintaining order within the units, as no success is possible without them. Regiment commanders are advised to stay close to their units and visit the trenches as often as possible.

If confusion arises during battle, division or brigade commanders must immediately intervene to restore order.

On April 9, 1915, Samad bey Mehmandarov was awarded the Order of the White Eagle with Swords, a prestigious Russian decoration. Among Azerbaijani individuals, this order was first conferred upon Vice Admiral Ibrahim bey Allahverdi bey oglu Aslanbeyov in 1888, followed by Full General of Cavalry Huseyn khan Kalbali khan oglu Nakhchivanski, and finally to Samad bey Sadig bey oglu Mehmandarov. Later that year, on October 15, he was further honored with the Order of St. Alexander Nevsky with Swords.

Throughout the war, Mehmandarov's corps never surrendered a single artillery piece to the enemy. He was also decorated with the highest military orders of the United Kingdom, France, and Romania.

Major Hajiaga Ibrahim beyli wrote about Mehmandarov’s participation in World War I:

General Mehmandarov gained great fame during World War I. His unparalleled composure and extraordinary bravery during the most perilous moments of combat were legendary within the Russian army. He naturally admired just, honorable, and straightforward individuals, offering them assistance, while being ruthless towards those who were dishonest. All those under his command both feared and respected him, yet they also loved and trusted him. A self-taught officer without formal military academy training, Mehmandarov achieved such high ranks purely due to his exceptional abilities, profound dedication to military service, unmatched courage and skill in battle, tireless commitment to his work, and impeccable character. Samad bey Mehmandarov was such an officer.

After the February Revolution, a rapid decline in the army began. Desertion sharply increased, and it became common for officers to be arbitrarily removed from their posts by soldiers' committees. On March 28, 1917, General of Artillery Mehmandarov was dismissed from his position as corps commander by the committee of officers and soldiers' representatives. On April 18, 1917, he was assigned to the reserve of officers under the jurisdiction of the Minsk Military District headquarters and, on August 7, 1917, was appointed a member of the Alexander Committee for the Wounded. That same year, Mehmandarov retired from military service and resided in Vladikavkaz at the mansion on Vorontsov Street belonging to his friend, Colonel Lieutenant Irzabay Akhundov (the grandson of Mirza Fatali Akhundov's brother).

=== Military service in Azerbaijan ===
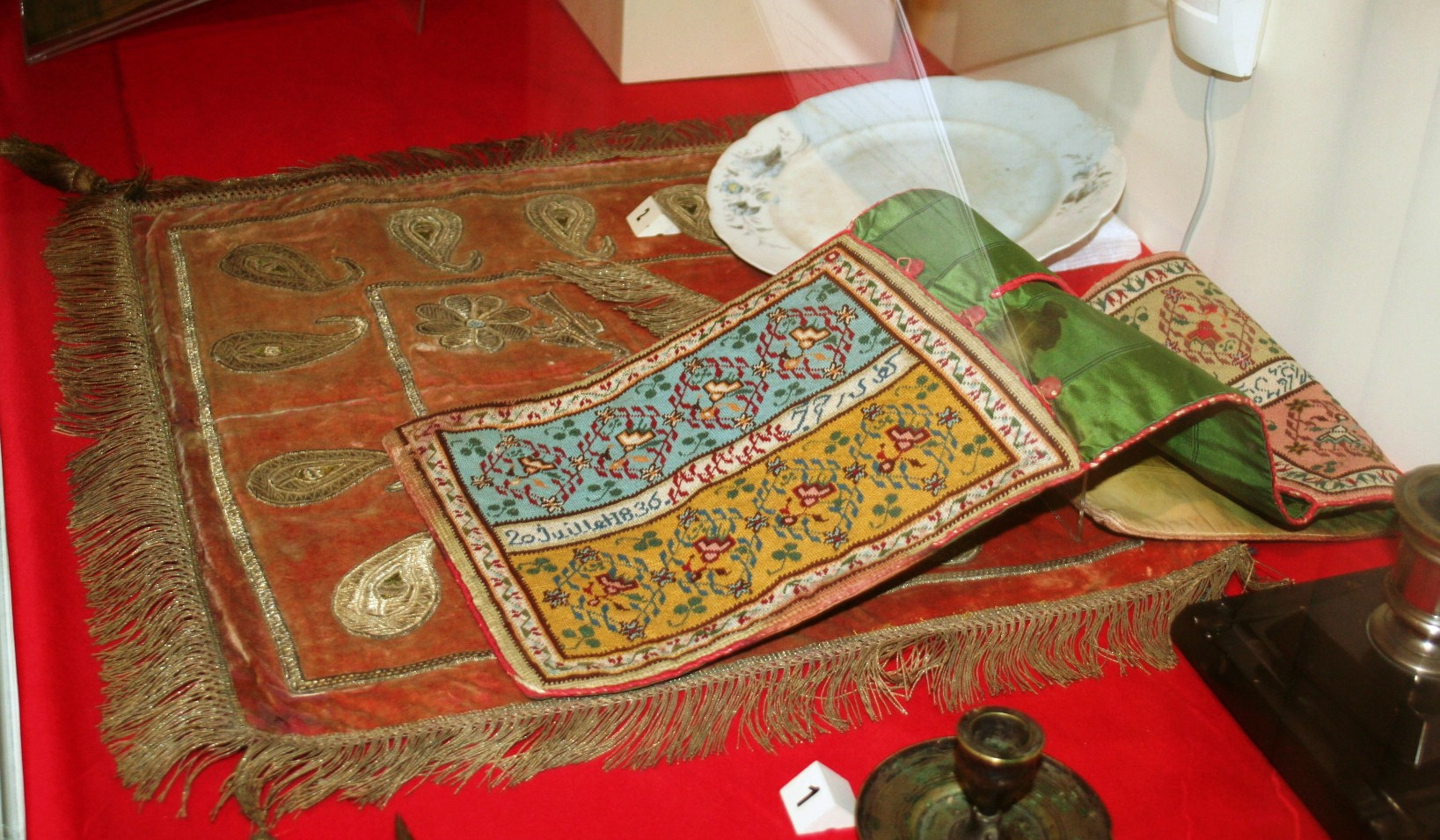
Mehmandarov's personal belongings (saddle bag and plate). National Museum of History of Azerbaijan (Baku)

==== In the service of the Azerbaijan Democratic Republic ====
After the declaration of the Azerbaijan Democratic Republic in 1918, he was invited to serve in the country's government. On November 1, by the decision of the Council of Ministers, the Ministry of Defense was established. The ministerial portfolio was entrusted to the Chairman of the Council of Ministers, Fatali Khan Khoyski, with artillery general Samad bey Mehmandarov appointed as his assistant. On November 15, by the order of Deputy Minister of Defense General Mehmandarov, the formation of the General Staff and the Secretariat of the Ministry of Defense commenced. On December 25, 1918, Mehmandarov was appointed Minister of Defense.

On November 17, 1918, the command of the British forces, which entered Baku on behalf of the Allied Powers, demanded the withdrawal of the Azerbaijan Democratic Republic's military forces, including the Ministry of Defense, from Baku. In connection with this, the Ministry was relocated to Ganja, where it remained operational until the middle of 1919. It was through his initiative that, based on the Ganja Military School, the Praporshchik School was first opened, followed by the Military School. At the same time, the Sappers School, Military Railwaymen's School, and Shusha Military Field Medic School were also established.

On January 3, 1919, by the order of the Minister of Defense, a commission was created to prepare staff and salary tables for the structural units, departments, and institutions of the Azerbaijan Republic Armed Forces and the Ministry of Defense. In the formation of the armed forces of the Azerbaijan Democratic Republic, taking into account local conditions, the organizational structure, staffing, management, and combat readiness principles of the Tsarist Russian army were adopted. On January 10, by the Minister's order, a Military Council was established under the Ministry of Defense. The Military Council was tasked with the preparation and resolution of issues related to military legislation, deployment, supply, training, and troop discipline. Under Mehmandarov's direct leadership, the national army of Azerbaijan was formed.

While serving as the Minister of Defense of the Azerbaijan Democratic Republic, Mehmandarov, in a letter to Prime Minister Nasib bey Yusifbeyli, criticized the actions of the British forces in Baku, requesting the Azerbaijan government to return the decorations awarded to him by the British government during World War I. By his order, the official language in the army was switched to Azerbaijani Turkic. It was decreed that military marches should be performed in this language, officers who did not know the language were to be taught it, and an oath of loyalty to Azerbaijan should be taken in Azerbaijani. At the same time, the design of battle flags and military uniforms reflecting national and historical symbols was approved.

On February 25, 1919, Mehmandarov addressed the public in a speech at the parliament. In this speech, as well as in other orders and correspondence, he strongly criticized the evasion of service by the children of wealthy families. A new system of conscription and mobilization was introduced to enlist all categories of the population who had reached military service age. The network of organs responsible for implementing this system was expanded, and efforts to return deserters and the children of wealthy individuals who avoided service were strengthened through cooperation with internal affairs authorities. Regular measures were taken to improve the conditions of service, one of the main reasons for desertion and evasion. Flexible and effective structures and management bodies of the army were created and further improved according to the tasks of ensuring Azerbaijan's military security in the given historical context. Necessary measures were taken to improve the army's material and technical supply and combat readiness.

By order No. 157, signed by Mehmandarov and the Chief of the General Staff, Major General Mammad bey Sulkeviç, an intelligence and counterintelligence division was established within the General Quartermaster Department of the Ministry of Defense's General Staff. This structure, operating within the military administration, focused solely on the military aspects of security. In a letter sent to the Chairman of the Council of Ministers on April 2, 1919, Samad bey Mehmandarov wrote:

The primary task of military counterintelligence is the fight against military espionage within the state, and since the struggle against Bolshevism is a national matter, the military administration alone cannot cope with it...

To prevent the threat of an attack by Denikin's troops, the creation of a strong defense system around Baku and along the northern border, the organization of a military operation to eliminate Bolshevik and Russian nationalist separatism in the Lankaran region, as well as the resolute repulsion of Armenian aggression in Karabakh in late March 1920, and the protection of the Republic's territorial integrity, were all part of Mehmandarov's activities as Minister of Defense. He was directly involved in these processes.

He held the position of Minister of Defense until the invasion of Azerbaijan by the Red Army on April 28, 1920.

===== During the April invasion =====
On the night of April 26–27, 1920, a Bolshevik uprising and a military intervention by the 11th Red Army began in Baku. Simultaneously, the 11th Red Army crossed the northern border. The following day, they issued an ultimatum to the government and parliament of the country, demanding the transfer of power to the Azerbaijani Communist (Bolshevik) Party. At the same time, armored trains belonging to Soviet Russia crossed the border, followed by the main forces of the 11th Red Army advancing forward. Events unfolded concurrently in the capital and the surrounding regions, but the conduct of the troops varied significantly. The armored trains crossing the border encountered local resistance, though it was not substantial. On April 27, Samad bey Mehmandarov urgently telegraphed the western front, where the main forces of the Azerbaijani army were stationed, stating:

The Bolsheviks have attacked the Yalama station, are advancing, and have captured Khudat. The situation is critical. I order a battalion of no fewer than 500 men, equipped with machine guns, to be sent to Qizilburun from both Kazakh and Ganja. The operation team is already prepared. Notify me by telegraph of their departure time; I expect these battalions to arrive tomorrow.

The next day, on April 28, the Minister of War was informed via telegraph from Ganja that battalions with machine-gun detachments would depart from the Agstafa and Ganja stations at 1 a.m. that night.

However, events in Baku unfolded quite differently. Some military units began to side with the insurgents. A regiment known as the "Relief Regiment" captured several neighborhoods in Baku. In the Zavokzal district, the 5th artillery battery and a cavalry detachment surrendered to the insurgents without a fight. By evening, the 7th Shirvan Infantry Regiment of the Azerbaijani army also joined the insurgents. That same evening, on April 28, an extraordinary session of parliament was convened to discuss the ultimatum for the surrender of power. Before the matter was debated, Mehmandarov addressed the parliament, stating that armed resistance was not feasible. According to Azerbaijani Communist Party member A. Shahbazov, while he was working as a telegraph operator at military headquarters on the morning of April 28, the duty officer informed Mehmandarov that worker patrols were stopping officers on their way to work and ordering them to remove their epaulets. Half an hour later, Mehmandarov arrived at headquarters, and Shahbazov heard him say, "I am no longer the Minister of War; last night the government handed over power to the workers' and peasants' government."

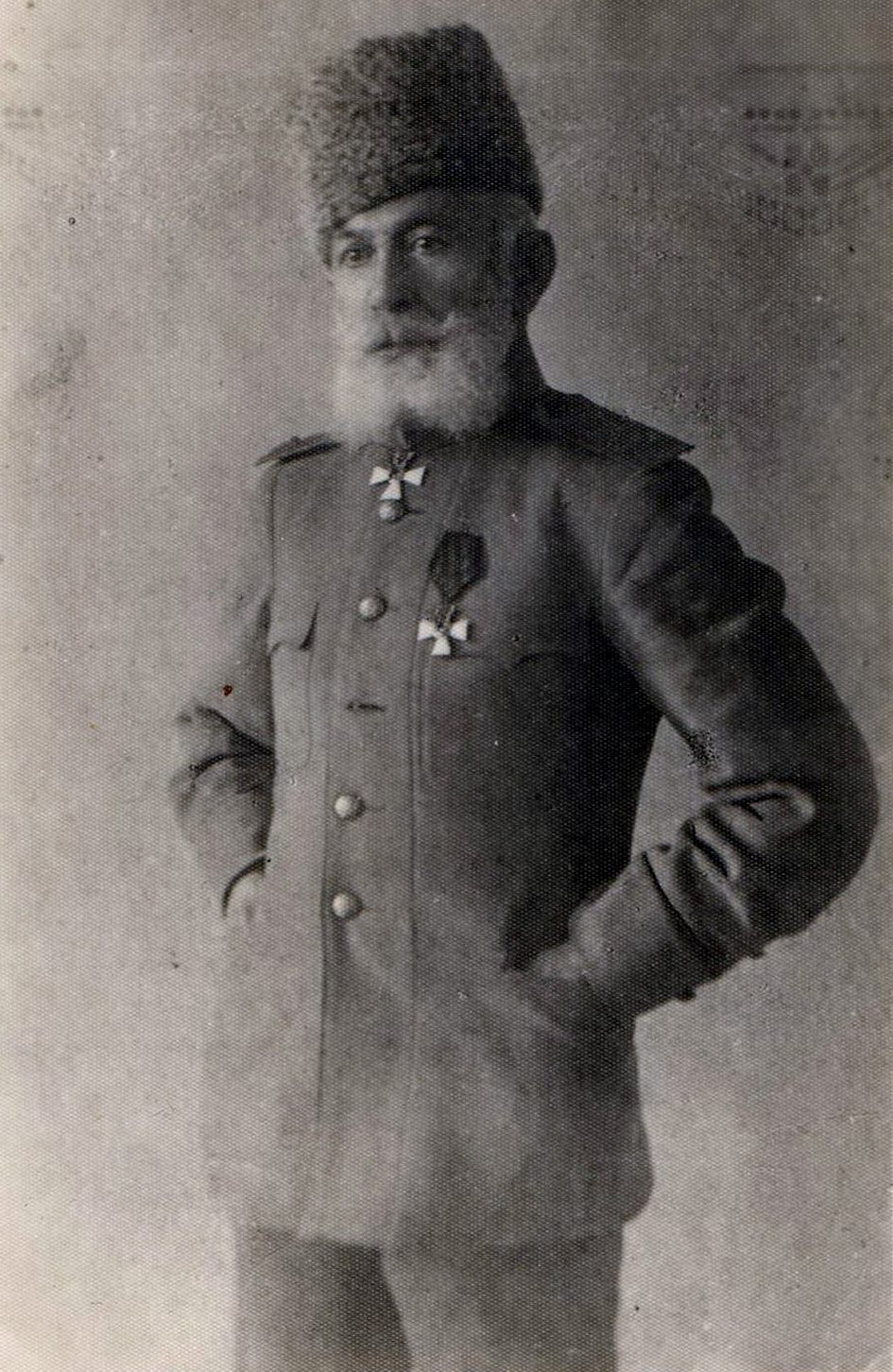
Mehmandarov, Minister of Defense of the Azerbaijan Democratic Republic

An experienced military leader, Mehmandarov assessed both the situation in the city and the state of the Baku garrison and sought to avoid bloodshed. Alongside Major General Abdulhamid bey Gaytabashi, who was temporarily acting as Chief of Staff, Mehmandarov signed Order No. 237, instructing that "work in all units, headquarters, offices, and institutions belonging to the Ministry of War should continue as it had been until now, until the handover to the new authorities." In his final order as Minister of War, Mehmandarov expressed gratitude to the military personnel for their service and conveyed his hope and belief that the soldiers and officers of the Azerbaijani army would continue to serve Azerbaijan "with honor and courage during the new era of governance." He concluded, "I pray to God for this."

In his memoirs, future Marshal of Aviation Sergey A. Krasovski compared Mehmandarov's actions during the April invasion with the emigration of Azerbaijani parliamentarians to Georgia. Krasovski emphasized that Mehmandarov had remained loyal to his people, dedicating his expertise and efforts to the establishment of the Red Army.

==== In the service of the Azerbaijan Soviet Socialist Republic ====
On the day of the April occupation, Pir or Igor Mehmandarov, the son of Mehmandarov, shared the following:

When my father returned from the parliamentary session on April 27 and saw the suitcases my mother had prepared for us to take along, he said, ‘Unpack these; we’re not going anywhere.’ My mother replied, ‘What are you saying? How can we not leave? Don’t you realize they will execute you?’ My father responded that at the end of the final parliamentary session, the leader of the "Hummat" faction, Aliheydar Garayev, approached him and assured him: ‘Samad bey, don’t leave; stay! Stay with us and work. I give you my word that not a single hair on your head will be harmed.’ My mother, however, protested: ‘Maybe they won’t do anything to you, but what about your son’s future, his life, and my condition?’ My father, with a resolute tone, said, ‘We are not going anywhere.’ My mother insisted, ‘The train is waiting in Bilajary…’ My father replied, ‘They’ll leave without us. I have no reason to leave the homeland.’ Indeed, the train in Bilajary, which was supposed to take the leaders of the Musavat government to Tbilisi, waited for an hour and a half because of my father.

Following the brutal suppression of the anti-Soviet uprising in Ganja at the end of May 1920, almost all high-ranking officers of the Azerbaijani National Army were arrested. Among those detained were Generals Samad bey Mehmandarov and Aliagha Shikhlinski, who were held in the Extraordinary Commission (Cheka) prison in Baku. According to the memoirs of A. Asgerov-Kangarli, who served as a special officer at the Azerbaijani military attaché in Georgia and later as the Azerbaijani military attaché in Turkey starting in July 1921, the generals were subjected to various humiliations and degrading treatment while imprisoned by the Cheka. Their lives were spared only due to the intervention of Nariman Narimanov, then head of the Azerbaijani Council of People’s Commissars. After the Ganja uprising, Mehmandarov and Shikhlinski, who were arrested on June 4, were sent to Moscow. Narimanov sent them to Moscow with the following accompanying letter addressed to Vladimir Lenin, dated August 1, 1920:

Dear Vladimir Ilyich,

During the Ganja uprising, all officers of the old Azerbaijani army were arrested, including the well-known Generals Mehmandarov and Shikhlinski, who are delivering this letter to you.

Upon further investigation, it was determined that these generals were not involved in the uprising. Nevertheless, to strengthen our position and assist our cause, we decided to place them at your disposal for military service. They are irreplaceable as military specialists. One of them, Shikhlinski, was known as the “king of artillery” in the Tsarist army.

Please allow them to work in Moscow until the Polish front concludes, after which I kindly request that they be sent back to us to assist in forming our own units. During this time, it is important to ensure their welfare.

As for their political views: they detest the Musavatists, believe Azerbaijan cannot exist without Soviet Russia, are hostile to England, and love Russia.

With communist greetings, N. Narimanov.

August 1, 1920.

Upon arriving in Moscow, both generals were rearrested and imprisoned in Butyrka Prison. Behbud Khan Cavanshir, the Soviet Azerbaijan representative in Moscow, reported to Narimanov that while the train had arrived, the generals could not be located. From a copy of a letter stored in the State Security Service archives, it is evident that Narimanov addressed Stalin on this matter. Stalin, in a letter dated November 12, 1920, to the deputy head of the All-Russian Extraordinary Commission (Cheka), Genrikh Yagoda, wrote:

After a thorough investigation, it was determined that Azerbaijani Generals S. Mehmandarov and A. Shikhlinski are not guilty of any crime. We request that you ensure their release from prison. — I. Stalin

Seven days later, the generals were released and sent to the field headquarters as members of the Permanent Artillery Commission.

In early August 1920, Mehmandarov arrived in Moscow, where he was assigned to the General Staff of the All-Russian Army and later joined the Artillery Regulations Commission. Meanwhile, efforts were underway in Azerbaijan to form the Azerbaijani Red Army. The People's Commissar for Military and Naval Affairs, Aliheydar Garayev, decided to recruit military specialists like Generals Shikhlinski and Mehmandarov. Garayev was already familiar with Mehmandarov from his time in the parliament of the Azerbaijan Democratic Republic.

In the autumn of 1921, both generals returned to Baku. Shikhlinski noted the following about their return:

On July 8, we both set off for Baku, arriving on July 22. In Baku, we joined the Headquarters of the Azerbaijani Soviet Troops. Additionally, we began teaching artillery courses at the Azerbaijani Commanders’ School—Mehmandarov taught in Russian, while I taught in Azerbaijani. The garrison commander issued an order to establish the ‘Military-Scientific Society of the Baku Garrison’ under his chairmanship. I was appointed deputy chair, though the commander himself rarely chaired meetings, which I usually presided over. Mehmandarov was also a member of this society.

At Garayev’s suggestion, the Soviet Azerbaijani government sought to involve Generals Mehmandarov and Shikhlinski in strengthening the Azerbaijani SSR’s military forces. Based on a request from the Azerbaijani government, Sergo Orjonikidze sent a special telegram assigning the generals to the Commissariat for Military and Naval Affairs of Soviet Azerbaijan. Between 1924 and 1928, Mehmandarov worked as an instructor at the Unified Commanders’ School. He actively participated in extensive military reforms in Azerbaijan during 1924–1927. Due to health issues, Mehmandarov retired from military service in 1928, and the Soviet government granted him a personal state pension.

Mehmandarov worked as an advisor for special assignments at the Commissariat for Military and Naval Affairs of Azerbaijan. He was regarded as one of the leading specialists in developing military operations, creating new units, and addressing organizational matters for the young Azerbaijani Red Army. The Commissariat’s deputy, future Lieutenant General A. I. Todorsky, remarked:

The Commissariat for Military and Naval Affairs had two prominent military specialists—Mehmandarov and Shikhlinski.

By a decision of the Council of People’s Commissars of the Azerbaijan SSR on October 24, 1922, a lifetime supplement of 50 rubles in gold was added to Mehmandarov’s monthly salary, even after his retirement. Mehmandarov was an instructor at the Azerbaijani Commanders’ School from 1924 to 1928, a member of the Baku Garrison’s Military-Scientific Society, and an advisor to the Commissariat for Military and Naval Affairs of Azerbaijan. On February 8, 1928, the Revolutionary Military Council of the Caucasian Red Banner Army petitioned for a personal state pension for Mehmandarov. On June 1, 1928, by order of the Revolutionary Military Council of the USSR, Mehmandarov was discharged from the Red Army due to health problems.

== Death ==
Mehmandarov was highly proficient in Russian, Turkish, and Persian. During the last three years of his life, he devoted himself to the study of Islamic history and philosophy. He died on February 12, 1931, in Baku and was buried in the Chemberekend Cemetery. In 1939, a park named after S. M. Kirov (now the Martyrs' Lane) was established on the site of the cemetery, resulting in the disappearance of Mehmandarov's grave.

== Awards ==
List:

- Medal "For the Conquest of the Kokand Khanate"
- Order of Saint Stanislaus, 3rd Class (1876)
- Order of Saint Anna, 3rd Class (1881)
- Order of Saint Stanislaus, 2nd Class (1891)
- Order of Saint Anna, 2nd Class (1896)
- Medal "In Commemoration of the Reign of Emperor Alexander III"
- Order of Saint Vladimir, 4th Class (1899)
- Order of Saint Vladimir, 3rd Class with Swords (1901)
- Medal "For the China Campaign"
- Golden Weapon for Bravery (1903)
- Order of St. George, 4th Class (1904)
- Order of Saint Stanislaus, 1st Class with Swords (1905)
- Russo-Japanese War Medal (1906)
- Order of Saint Anna, 1st Class (1911)
- Order of Saint Vladimir, 2nd Class with Swords (1915)
- Order of Saint George, 3rd Class (1915)
- George Weapon, adorned with diamonds (1915)
- Order of the White Eagle with Swords (1915)
- Order of Saint Alexander Nevsky with Swords (1915)
- Knight Grand Cross of the Order of St Michael and St George (1915)

== Legacy ==
In the cities of Baku, Barda, Ganja, Aghjabadi, Lankaran, Quba, and Qabala, one of the central streets is named after Samad bey Mehmandarov. Additionally, one of the tankers of the Azerbaijan Caspian Shipping Company bears the name General Mehmandarov. He is also one of the main characters in Alexander Stepanov's novels Port Arthur and The Zvonarev Family.

Parks named after Samad bey Mehmandarov have been established in the cities of Baku and Lankaran.

A memorial plaque in his honor has been placed on the façade of the mansion on Vorontsovskaya Street (now Butyrina Street) in Vladikavkaz, where he lived. The mansion belonged to Colonel Irzabay Akhundov who was a relative of the writer and playwright Mirza Fatali Akhundov. The President of the Republic of Azerbaijan, Ilham Aliyev, signed a decree on celebrating the 160th anniversary of Samad bey Mehmandarov's birth.

== Family ==
Mehmandarov married Elizaveta Nikolayevna Teslav, a member of the Kyiv nobility. However, the couple remained childless for an extended period. On November 18, 1908, after many years, Mehmandarov had a son, whom he named Pir. According to military historian Shamistan Nazirli, Pir (later renamed Igor (Note: Mehmandarov's wife, Elizaveta Nikolayevna Teslav, later changed her child's name to Igor Samedovich Mehmandarov.)) Mehmandarov met with him in Baku. It became known that Igor and his mother, Elizaveta Nikolayevna, faced systematic persecution by the Soviet Union starting in the early 1930s. The family was first forced to relocate to Saint Petersburg in 1930, where they endured harassment by the police and secret police. They were later exiled to Saratov in 1937 and to Siberia in 1941. During their exile to Siberia, Elizaveta Mehmandarova died in a train explosion caused by German forces. After the exile, Igor lived in Kaliningrad for an extended period before being invited to Baku in 1977 by Azerbaijani authorities. After Azerbaijan gained independence, official documents for both Igor and his mother were obtained from the prosecutor's offices in Saint Petersburg and Saratov.

Igor Mehmandarov was invited to Baku by Heydar Aliyev, who also provided him with a residence. The only child of Samad Bey, Igor and his wife, Iza Kulagina, had no children. Igor died in 1989 and was buried in Yasamal cemetery. According to historian Shamistan Nazirli, Iza Kulagina was still alive as of 2017. She was the daughter of Major General Ivan Kulagin, who served in the XI Red Army during the Soviet invasion of Azerbaijan in April 1920. During World War II, Kulagin commanded the 35th Lozovskaya Rifle Division and later continued his military service in Soviet Azerbaijan.

=== Filmography ===
- I Loved You Like the Whole World (film, 1985)
- Samad Bey (film, 1995)
- He Was Considered the King of Artillery (film, 1996)
- The Lonely Spirit (film, 1998)
- Generals of the Republic (film, 2006)
- Sardar (film, 2015)
- Muslims Whom Russia is Proud Of (Russian: Мусульмане, которыми гордится Россия)

== See also ==
- House of Mehmandarovs
- Aliagha Shikhlinski

== Sources ==
- Qaraoğlu, Fazil (2017). Tarixdə iz buraxanlar: Səməd bəy Mehmandarov (in Azerbaijani).
- Nəzirli, Şəmistan (2012). General Əliağa Şıxlinski və Silahdaşları (PDF) (in Azerbaijani).
- Hacıyev, E. (1993). Bir qara ləkə də silindi (in Azerbaijani). Xalq qəzeti.
- Nəcəfova, Nuranə (2012). Cümhuriyyət ordusunun memarı (in Azerbaijani). Bütöv Azərbaycan qəzeti, № 42 (174).
- Azərbaycan Xalq Cümhuriyyəti Ensiklopediyası: II cild (2005). Zəngəzur əməliyyatı (in Azerbaijani). Bakı: Lider nəşriyyat.
- Коллектив авторов (2015). Великая Отечественная: Комдивы. Военный биографический словарь. Командиры стрелковых, горнострелковых дивизий, крымских, полярных, петрозаводских дивизий, дивизий ребольского направления, истребительных дивизий. (Ибянский — Печененко). Т. 4. (in Russian). Moskva: Кучково поле.
- Исмаилов, Э. Э. (2007a). Мехмандаров Самед-бек. Archived from the original on 19 December 2007.
- Первая мировая война (2020). Мехмандаров Самед. Документы о награждениях, генерал от артиллерии (in Russian). gwar.mil.ru. Archived from the original on 3 July 2020.
- Nəzirli, Şəmistan (2013). HƏRBİ TƏHSİL DALINCA (in Azerbaijani). Bakı: Ədalət.
- Исмаилов, Э. Э. (2005). Георгиевские кавалеры — азербайджанцы (in Russian). Moskva: Герои отечества. ISBN 978-5-91017-005-0.
- Кавказский календарь на 1851 год [Caucasian Calendar for 1851] (in Russian). Tbilisi: Chancellery of the Caucasian Governor. 1850.
- Аттестационный список капитанам (по старшинству в чинах) 38 Артиллерийской бригады [Certification list of captains (by seniority in ranks) of the 38th Artillery Brigade.] (Report) (in Russian). Archive of the Military History Museum of Artillery, Engineering Troops and Signal Corps. 1 September 1892.
- ВП по военному ведомству (1896). Мехмандаров Самед. Разведчик № 294.
- Список полковникам по старшинству (1903). Список полковникам по старшинству. Составлен по 1-е января 1903 г. (in Russian). СПб: Военной типографии.
- Шихлинский, А.-А. (1944). Мои воспоминания (in Russian). Баку: Изд-во АзФАН.
- Исмаилов, Э. Э. (2007). Золотое оружие с надписью «За храбрость». Списки кавалеров 1788—1913 (in Russian).
- Список генералам по старшинству (1913). Список генералам по старшинству, часть 1, 2 и 3, составлен по 1-е января 1913 года (in Russian). Военной типографии.
- Ларенко, П. Н. (2005). Страдные дни Порт-Артура. // Русско-японская война: Взгляд побеждённых (in Russian). Moskva: ACT: Транзиткнига.
- Список генералам по старшинству (1906). Список генералам по старшинству. Составлен по 1-е июля 1906 года (in Russian). СПб: Военной типографии.
- Булгаков, Ф. И. (1906). Порт-Артур. Японская осада и русская оборона его с моря и суши. т.2 (in Russian). СПб: тип. Суворина.
- Сорокин, А. И. (1952). Оборона Порт-Артура (in Russian). Moskva: Воениздат.
- Список генералам по старшинству (1914). Список генералам по старшинству. Составлен по 15 апреля 1914 года (in Russian). С.-Петербург: Военной типографии.
- Залесский, К. А. (2003). Кто был кто в Первой мировой войне (in Russian). ACT: Астрель.
- Российский государственный военно-исторический архив. ф. 2351 (2024). Российский государственный военно-исторический архив. ф. 2351 (21-я пехотная дивизия), оп. 1, д. 399 (in Russian).
- Российский государственный военно-исторический архив. ф. 2296 (2024). Российский государственный военно-исторический архив. ф. 2351 (2-й Кавказский армейский корпус), оп. 1, д. 13 (in Russian).
- Шабанов, В. М. (2004). Военный орден Святого Великомученика и Победоносца Георгия. Именные списки 1769—1920. Биобиблиографический справочник (in Russian). Moskva: Изд-во Русскій мір. ISBN 5-89577-059-2.
- Гапоненко, Под ред. Л. С. (1968). Рапорт временно командующего II Кавказским армейским корпусом В. О. Бенескула военному министру А. И. Гучкову о смещении солдатами 2-й Кавказской гренадерской дивизии командного состава корпуса и дивизии // Революционное движение в русской армии. 27 февраля — 24 октября 1917 г. Сб. док. (in Russian).
- Абасов, А. (1977). Генерал Мехмандаров (in Russian).
- Ибрагимов, С. (1975). sГенерал Али Ага Шихлинский (in Russian). Баку: Азербайджанское гос. изд-во.
- Гусейнов, А. (1976). Алигейдар Караев (биографический очерк) (in Russian). Баку: Азербайджанское гос. изд-во.
- Азербайджанская Демократическая Республика (1918―1920). Армия. (Документы и материалы) (PDF) (in Russian). 1998.
- Гасанлы, Дж. (2010). История дипломатии Азербайджанской Республики: Внешняя политика Азербайджанской Демократической Республики (1918—1920). Т. I. (in Russian). Флинта: Наука. ISBN 978-5-9765-0900-9.
- История Азербайджана (1963). История Азербайджана: ч. 1. Азербайджан в период пролетарской революции и построения социализма. ч. 2. Азербайджан в годы завершения строительства социалистического общества и в период пазвернытого строительства коммунизма (in Russian). Баку: Изд-во АН Азербайджанской ССР. Т. 3, часть 1.
- Дарабади, П. (1991). Военные проблемы политической истории Азербайджана начала XX века (in Russian). Баку: Элм.
- Агамалиева, Н. (1998). Азербайджанская Демократическая Республика (1918-1920) (in Russian). Баку: Элм. ISBN 5-8066-0897-2.
- Амирханова-Кулиш, Амирханова-Кулиш А. С.; Зульпукаров, Зульпукаров З. Г. (1981). Помощь Красной Армии в социалистическом строительстве в Азербайджане (in Russian). Наука.
