= Şorsulu, Salyan =

Şorsulu
- Municipality
- Location within Azerbaijan
- Coordinates: 39°25′02″N 48°49′22″E
- Country: Azerbaijan
- Rayon: Salyan

Population
  - Total: 3,004
- Time zone: UTC+4 (AZT)
  - Summer (DST): UTC+5 (AZT)

Şorsulu (also, Shorsuli, Shorsulu, and Shorsuly) is a village and municipality in the Salyan Rayon of Azerbaijan. It has a population of 3,004.
