= Pokrov, Alexandrovsky District, Vladimir Oblast =

Pokrov Покров
- Village
- Location within Vladimir Oblast Location within Russia
- Coordinates: 56°29′N 39°09′E
- Country: Russia
- Region: Vladimir Oblast
- District: Alexandrovsky District
- Time zone: UTC+3:00

Pokrov (Russian: Покров) is a rural locality (a village) in Andreyevskoye Rural Settlement, Alexandrovsky District, Vladimir Oblast, Russia. The population was 2 as of 2010.

== Geography ==
The village is located 15 km north-east from Andreyevskoye and 32 km north-east from Alexandrov.
