= Günəşli, Jalilabad =

Günəşli
- Location within Azerbaijan
- Coordinates: 39°17′16″N 48°34′14″E
- Country: Azerbaijan
- Rayon: Jalilabad
- Time zone: UTC+4 (AZT)
  - Summer (DST): UTC+5 (AZT)

Günəşli (known as Pokrovka until 2001) is a village in the Jalilabad Rayon of Azerbaijan.
