= Qaratəpə, Sabirabad =

Qaratəpə
- Location within Azerbaijan
- Coordinates: 39°58′08″N 48°36′55″E
- Country: Azerbaijan
- Rayon: Sabirabad

Population
  - Total: 2,849
- Time zone: UTC+4 (AZT)
  - Summer (DST): UTC+5 (AZT)

Qaratəpə (known as Pokrovka until 1999) is a village and municipality in the Sabirabad Rayon of Azerbaijan. It has a population of 2,849.

== Notable natives ==
- Mubariz Ahmadov — National Hero of Azerbaijan.
