= Battle of Binagadi =

1918 battle between Ottoman-Azerbaijani forces and Bolshevik-Dashnak forces

- Part of the Armenian–Azerbaijani war in the Caucasus campaign of World War I and the Southern Front of the Russian Civil War
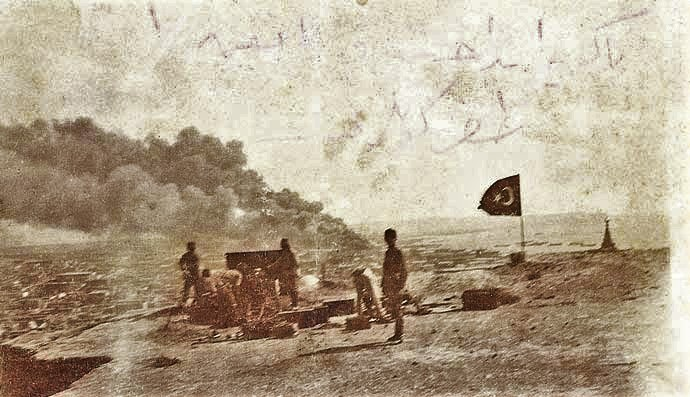
- Ottoman artillery bombarding the city.
Date	26 August 1918 – 1 September 1918
Location	Binəqədi, Baku, Azerbaijan
Result	Ottoman–Azerbaijani victory
Territorial changes	Ottoman–Azerbaijani coalition forces capture Binagadi

Belligerents
Ottoman Empire (Azerbaijan Democratic Republic) Azerbaijan	Centrocaspian Dictatorship; Dashnaktsutyun (United Kingdom of Great Britain and Ireland) United Kingdom; White Russians; Baku Commune (Russian Soviet Federative Socialist Republic) Russian SFSR

Commanders and leaders
(Ottoman Empire) Nuri Pasha (Ottoman Empire) Mürsel Bey (Ottoman Empire) Süleyman Izzet Bey (Azerbaijan Democratic Republic) Ali-Agha Shikhlinski (Azerbaijan Democratic Republic) Gaimmegam Hasan Bey	(United Kingdom of Great Britain and Ireland) Lionel Dunsterville; General Dokuchaev; Colonel Avetisov †; Hamazasp Srvandztyan

The Battle of Binagadi (Azerbaijani: Binəqədi döyüşü; Turkish: Binegedi savaşı) took place between 26 and 31 August 1918 during World War I and saw Soviet Russia briefly re-enter the war. Ottoman–Azerbaijani coalition forces led by Nuri Pasha fought British–Armenian–White Russian forces led by Lionel Dunsterville. It was an important part of the Battle of Baku.

== Background ==
In 1917, the Russian Caucasus Front collapsed following the abdication of the Tsar. On 9 March 1917, the Special Transcaucasian Committee was established to fill the administrative gap in areas occupied in the course of the war on the Caucasian front by the Russian Provisional Government in the Transcaucasia. In November 1917, the first government of the independent Transcaucasia was created in Tbilisi and named the Transcaucasian Commissariat following the Bolshevik seizure of power in St. Petersburg. On 5 December 1917, this new "Transcaucasian Committee" gave endorsement to the Armistice of Erzincan which was signed by the Russians with the command of the Ottoman Third Army. Russian soldiers mainly left the front and returned to their homes. A number of Russian troops left for the Persian Campaign, contrary to the rules of the Armistice.

On 10 February 1918, the Sejm gathered and made the decision to establish independence. On 24 February 1918, the Sejm proclaimed the Transcaucasia as independent under the Transcaucasian Democratic Federative Republic.

On 3 March 1918, the Grand Vizier Talat Pasha signed the Treaty of Brest-Litovsk with the Russian SFSR. The Treaty of Brest-Litovsk stipulated that the border be pulled back to prewar levels and that the cities of Batum, Kars, and Ardahan be transferred to the Ottoman Empire. Between 14 March – April 1918, the Trabzon peace conference was held between the Ottoman Empire and the delegation of the Sejm.

On 9 March 1918, the arrest of General Talyshinski, the commander of the Azerbaijani division, and some of its officers all of whom arrived in Baku increased the anti-Soviet feelings among the city's Azerbaijani population. On 30 March, based on the unfounded report that the Azerbaijani (Muslim) crew of the ship Evelina was armed and ready to revolt against the Soviet, the Soviet disarmed the crew who tried to resist. The three days of inter-ethnic warfare referred to as the March Days, which resulted in the massacre of up to 12,000 Azerbaijanis by the Bolsheviks and armed Armenian units in the city of Baku and other locations in the Baku Governorate. The March events, beyond the violent three-day period, touched off a series of massacres all over Azerbaijan.

In May 1918, Azerbaijan declared its independence. At that time, the main goal of the state was to liberate Baku. The Ottoman Empire helped him in this. In June 1918, military operations began for Baku.

== Battle ==
Battle of Binagadi was important part of Battle of Baku. The main purpose of the battle was to capture the hills 311 and 364 near the village of Binagadi.

In the battle that began on August 26, the 13th Infantry Regiment captured Hill 364. Hill 311 could not be captured. On August 27, Centrocaspian Dictatorship tried to recapture Hill 364, but failed. After a while, the hill 311 was captured by Azerbaijanis. In addition to Binagadi village, Digah and Mohammadi villages were also taken over by Azerbaijanis.

== Aftermath ==
After the battle, General Lionel Dunsterville declared that "no force on earth can take Baku from the Turks." Thus, in the north of Baku, the Centrocaspian Dictatorship was pushed back to the heights of Bilajari, and important positions were taken for the organization of a decisive attack for the liberation of Baku.

== See also ==
- Battle of Baku
