= Digah =

Digah or Digyakh or Dygya may refer to:

- Digah, Absheron, Azerbaijan
- Digah, Lankaran, Azerbaijan
- Digah, Lerik, Azerbaijan
- Digah, Masally, Azerbaijan
- Digah, Quba, Azerbaijan
- Digah, Ərməki, Quba Rayon, Azerbaijan
