= September Days =

1918 massacre of Armenians in Baku

- Part of the Armenian-Azerbaijani War
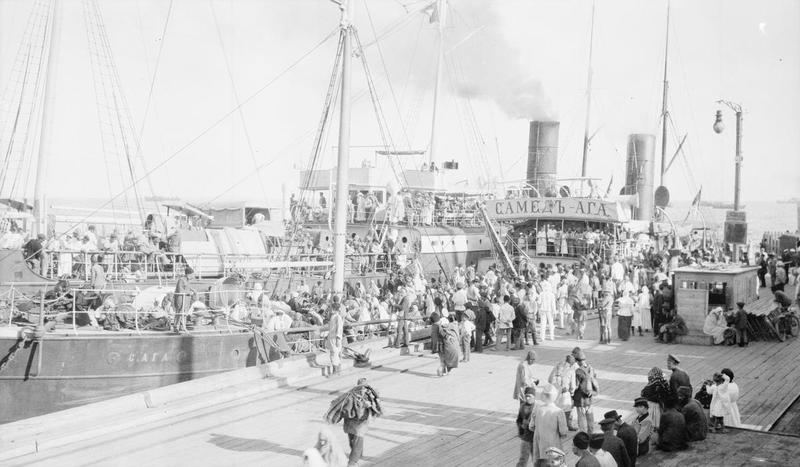
- Refugees leaving the town of Baku.
- Location: Baku, Azerbaijan Democratic Republic
- Date: September 1918
- Target: Armenians in Baku
- Deaths: 10,000–30,000 Armenians killed; rest of Armenian community deported
- Victim: Armenians
- Perpetrators: Army of Islam, Azerbaijani irregulars

The September Days (Armenian: 1918 թ. Բաքվի հայերի կոտորած, romanized: Bakvi hayeri kotorats, lit. '1918 massacre of Baku Armenians') refers to a period during the Armenian–Azerbaijani war and the Battle of Baku in September 1918 when Armenian inhabitants of Baku, Azerbaijan, were massacred by Enver Pasha's Army of Islam and their local Azerbaijani allies when they captured the soon-to-be capital of the Azerbaijan Democratic Republic. It is estimated that around 10,000 to 30,000 ethnic Armenians were killed in the violence. It was the last major massacre of World War I.

== Background ==
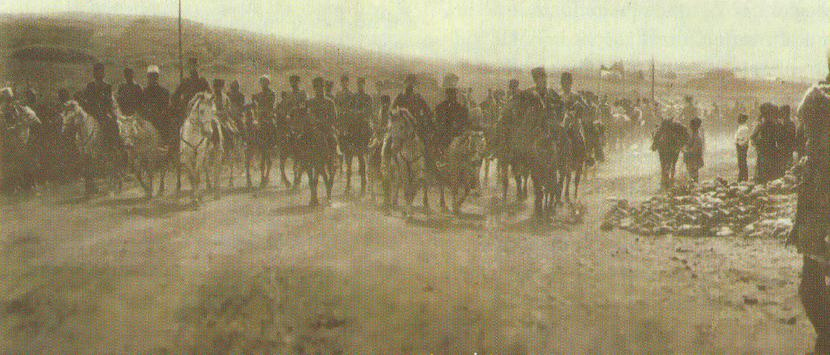
Army of Islam attack on Baku

Before and during March 1918, the road between Yerevan and Daralagyaz, which passed through Muslim villages, was the site of frequent attacks and murders of Armenians on the roads. Open inter-ethnic conflict between Armenians and Azerbaijanis broke out in the March Days in March 1918; some scholars consider the September Days a continuation or retaliation for the March Days, which is itself considered a retaliation for the Armenian genocide.

Since April 1918, the city of Baku had been governed by a Soviet (council) under the leadership of the Bolshevik Stepan Shahumyan. The Baku Sovnarkom or Soviet had been collaborating with the local branch of the Armenian Dashnaktsutiun party to establish control over the city and its surrounding environs but by the beginning of the summer of that year, it found itself under increasing threat by the advancing armies of the Ottoman Empire. The armed forces of the two sides clashed in June and July but the forces loyal to the Baku Soviet were unable to halt the joint Ottoman-Azerbaijani offensive and were forced to retreat. With the Ottomans and Azeris poised to strike Baku and with no promise of material support from Moscow, the Baku Soviet was forced to turn to a British expeditionary force which was stationed in the region under the command of Major General Lionel C. Dunsterville. Although Shahumyan was under orders from Moscow to deny entry to the British, he was overruled by his peers in the Soviet, who formally requested British help in late July. On July 31, Shahumyan and the other Bolshevik members of the Baku Sovnarkom resigned from their posts and control of the city was assumed by the Centro-Caspian Dictatorship.

In August, the Ottoman military, led by the Army of Islam, launched a new assault against the frontline positions, which were primarily manned by Armenians. Despite some initial victories, the Armenians had to retreat. The size of the British expeditionary force had proved ultimately to be too small to make much of an impact in the defense of Baku. In the first week of September, a joint Ottoman-Azerbaijani force composed of 15,000 men advanced without much resistance toward Baku and by September 13, had reached the suburbs of the city; meanwhile, Baku's Muslim population prepared to welcome the entry of the Ottoman army. The remaining Armenian troops were too ill-prepared to halt the advance and Dunsterville refused to retain his force any longer. On September 14 his force evacuated from Baku and sailed to Enzeli, leaving the city virtually defenseless.

== Events of September Days ==
A terrible panic in Baku ensued once the Turks entered the city. The Armenians crowded the harbor in a frantic effort to escape. Regular Ottoman troops were not allowed to enter the city for two days, so that the local irregulars would conduct looting and pillaging. Despite this order, regular Ottoman troops participated alongside the irregulars and the Azeris of Baku in the plundering, who then turned their fury against the city's Armenian population. Calls by the German officers attached to the Ottoman command staff to treat the local population with leniency were ignored by the Ottoman commanders. The man in charge of posts and telegraphs in Baku, one of those who negotiated the surrender of the city and vainly tried to prevent the worst excesses, noted:

Robberies, murders and rapes were at their height [at 4.00 p.m. on 15 September]. In the whole town massacres of the Armenian population and robberies of all non-Muslim peoples were going on. They broke the doors and windows, entered the living quarters, dragged out men, women and children and killed them in the street. From all the houses the yells of the people who were being attacked were heard....In some spots there were mountains of dead bodies, and many had terrible wounds from dum-dum bullets. The most appalling picture was at the entrance to the Treasury Lane from Surukhanskoi Street. The whole street was covered with dead bodies of children not older than nine or ten years. About eighty bodies carried wounds inflicted by swords or bayonets, and many had their throats cut; it was obvious that the wretched ones had been slaughtered like lambs. From Telephone Street we heard cries of women and children and we heard single shots. Rushing to their rescue I was obliged to drive the car over the bodies of dead children. The crushing of bones and strange noises of torn bodies followed. The horror of the wheels covered with the intestines of dead bodies could not be endured by the colonel and the asker (adjutant). They closed their eyes with their hands and lowered their heads. They were afraid to look at the terrible slaughter. Half mad from what he saw, the driver sought to leave the street, but was immediately confronted by another bloody hecatomb.

On September 16, the Ottoman divisions formally entered the city in a victory parade reviewed by Ottoman High Command. Baku would subsequently be proclaimed as the capital of the newly established Azerbaijani Republic.

Estimates of the dead range from 10,000 to 30,000 Armenians. According to a special commission formed by the Armenian National Council, a total of 8,988 ethnic Armenians were massacred, among which were 5,248 Armenian inhabitants of Baku, 1,500 Armenian refugees from other parts of the Caucasus who were in Baku, and 2,240 Armenians whose corpses were found in the streets but whose identities were never established.The Armenian Genocide Museum provides an exact number of 29,063 for the number of dead in the massacres (from a total Armenian population of 88,673). Moreover, 9,000 young Armenians were sent into forced labor on the Mughan Steppe, however, only 400 returned.

== German reaction ==
[It is] deeply shameful that the war situation forced us to cooperate with such beasts like the Turks and that we could not stand up to them in a way humanity would have compelled us to do...

— Friedrich Freiherr Kress von Kressenstein (1918)

During the German Caucasus expedition, the Germans and the Turks almost went to war. The Germans witnessed the September Days, as well as other atrocities by Turks against Christians. Having already witnessed the Armenian genocide and its aftermath, it had become clear by 1918 that the Germans had been at the end of their rope and had unanimously become anti-Turkish.

German officer Ernst Paraquin was so enraged about the atrocities that he screamed in the face of Nuri Pasha, despite being in the presence of other Turkish officers, and held him directly responsible for the massacres. This caused Paraquin to get sacked by Turkish authorities; Halil Kut hinted to Paraquin that if he continued talking about the massacres, he would get court-martialed and hanged.

Friedrich Freiherr Kress von Kressenstein and other German military officers also felt disgusted and tried to help victims. German units offered help to Armenian refugees, while Kress von Kressenstein informed his superiors that the Turks were resolved on destroying the remnants of the Armenians by a new method: encirclement, blockage, and mass starvation. He directly appealed to the German Foreign Office, calling for direct intervention. He wrote that it is "deeply shameful that the war situation forced us to cooperate with such beasts like the Turks and that we could not stand up to them in a way humanity would have compelled us to do". He pled for the "rescue [of] half a million Christians from certain starvation" and note that "Public opinion and history would judge us guilty for the annihilation of the Armenians".

Otto von Lossow twice, in May and September, explicitly warned his superiors that Turkish military leaders were aiming at "the total extermination of the Russian Armenians in the Transcaucasus". He dismissed Turkish claims of an alleged "Armenian danger" and "military necessity measures" as nonsensical; he blamed Turkish generals Mehmet Esat Pasha, Yakup Şevki Pasha, and Nuri Pasha as responsible for the spread of that type of disinformation, used for "justifying the mass murder".

== See also ==
- Battle of Baku
- Shusha pogrom
- Anti-Armenianism
- Agulis massacre
