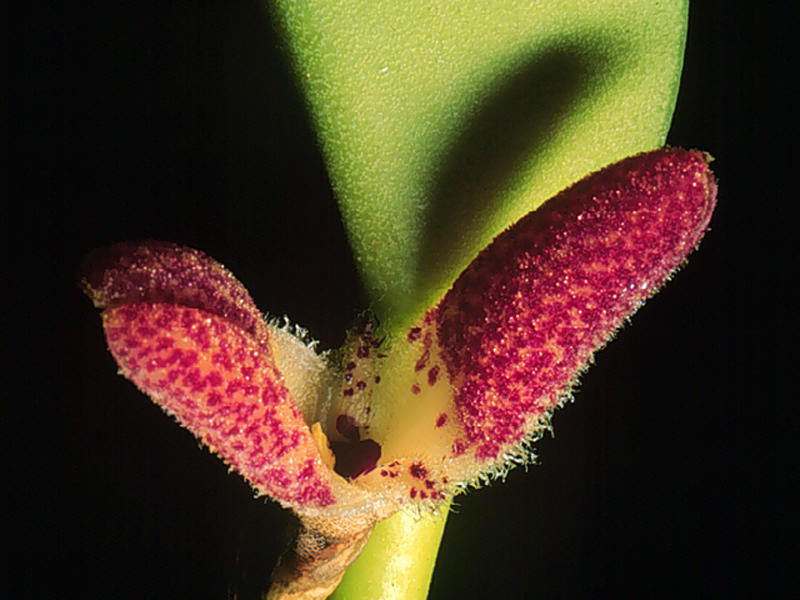

Conservation status
- Apparently Secure (NatureServe)
- CITES Appendix II

Scientific classification
- Kingdom: Plantae
- Clade: Tracheophytes
- Clade: Angiosperms
- Clade: Monocots
- Order: Asparagales
- Family: Orchidaceae
- Subfamily: Epidendroideae
- Genus: Restrepiella
- Species: R. ophiocephala

Binomial name
- Restrepiella ophiocephala (Lindl.) Garay & Dunst.

Synonyms
- Pleurothallis ophiocephala Lindl.; Restrepia ophiocephala (Lindl.) Rchb.f.; Pleurothallis peduncularis Hook.; Pleurothallis puberula Klotzsch; Pleurothallis stigmatoglossa Rchb.f. ex Lindl.; Restrepiella ophiocephala f. clausa I.Bock

= Restrepiella ophiocephala =

Snake's head restrepiella

Species of orchid

Restrepiella ophiocephala, commonly called the Snake's head restrepiella is an epiphytic orchid native to Mexico, Central America, Colombia, and Florida. The epithet ophiocephala is derived from the Greek words ὄφις, ophis (snake) and κεφαλή, kephalē (head).

Restrepiella ophiocephala grows from a short, creeping rhizome as a tufted, robust epiphyte to a length between 8 and 35 cm. The stout, cylindrical stem is erect and about 15 cm long and has a tubular bract. The fleshy, oblanceolate leaves are 8 to 18 cm long and have a short petiole. The tiny single flowers have a length of about 2 cm. They grow from the base of the leaves, one at a time, on up to four clustered inflorescences. They have a pale yellowish-brown color, dotted with dull purple spots. The outer surface is downy. The obovate, dorsal sepal is erect, while the lateral sepals are fused (synsepals) with a small split at their apex. The elliptic petals are much shorter and with ciliated margins. The fleshy lip is tongue-shaped. It occurs in damp forests alongside rivers at low altitude (40-1,600 m). The flowers are in bloom from winter to spring and are strongly scented.
