= Georgy Dokuchaev =

Georgy Arkadyevich Dokuchaev (Russian: Георгий Аркадьевич Докучаев; 14 January 1864 - after 1920) was an Imperial Russian and White Russian armies officer, major general.

== Military career ==
Dokuchaev graduated from Voronezh Mikhailovsky Cadet Corps. He joined the military service on 25 March 1883 as a junker in the 1st Pavel Military School. On 14 August 1884, he received the rank of podporuchik in the 135th Kerch-Yenikolsk Infantry Regiment of the 34th Infantry Division.

In 1903, he became officer-educator of the Tiflis Cadet Corps in the rank of captain. In 1904, he was conferred the rank of lieutenant colonel.

Since 1 January 1909, he served in the 261st Infantry Reserve Shemakha Regiment of the 66th Infantry Reserve Brigade, and was a commander of a battalion. In 1914, he became colonel in the 205th Shemakha Infantry Regiment of the 52nd Infantry Division.

After the World War I started, Dokuchaev became on 2 April 1916 the commander of a brigade in the 5th Caucasian Rifle Division. He was conferred the rank of Major General on 10 July 1916.

From late July to mid-September 1918, he commanded the forces of the Centrocaspian Dictatorship in the battle of Baku against the Islamic Army of the Caucasus under the command of Turkish general Nuri Pasha Killigil and the armed forces of Azerbaijan Democratic Republic. General Dunsterville, who led the British expeditionary force, described Dokuchaev as "an exceptionally refined and pleasant gentleman to deal with, but his character was not suited to the position of Commander-in-Chief of a revolutionary army".

Later, Dokuchaev served in the Armed Forces of South Russia; since 13 July 1919 he was in reserve at the headquarters of the Commander-in-Chief. In March 1920 he was interned in Georgia. In 1921, he was mentioned in the list of conditionally amnestied prisoners of Ryazan forced labor camp.
