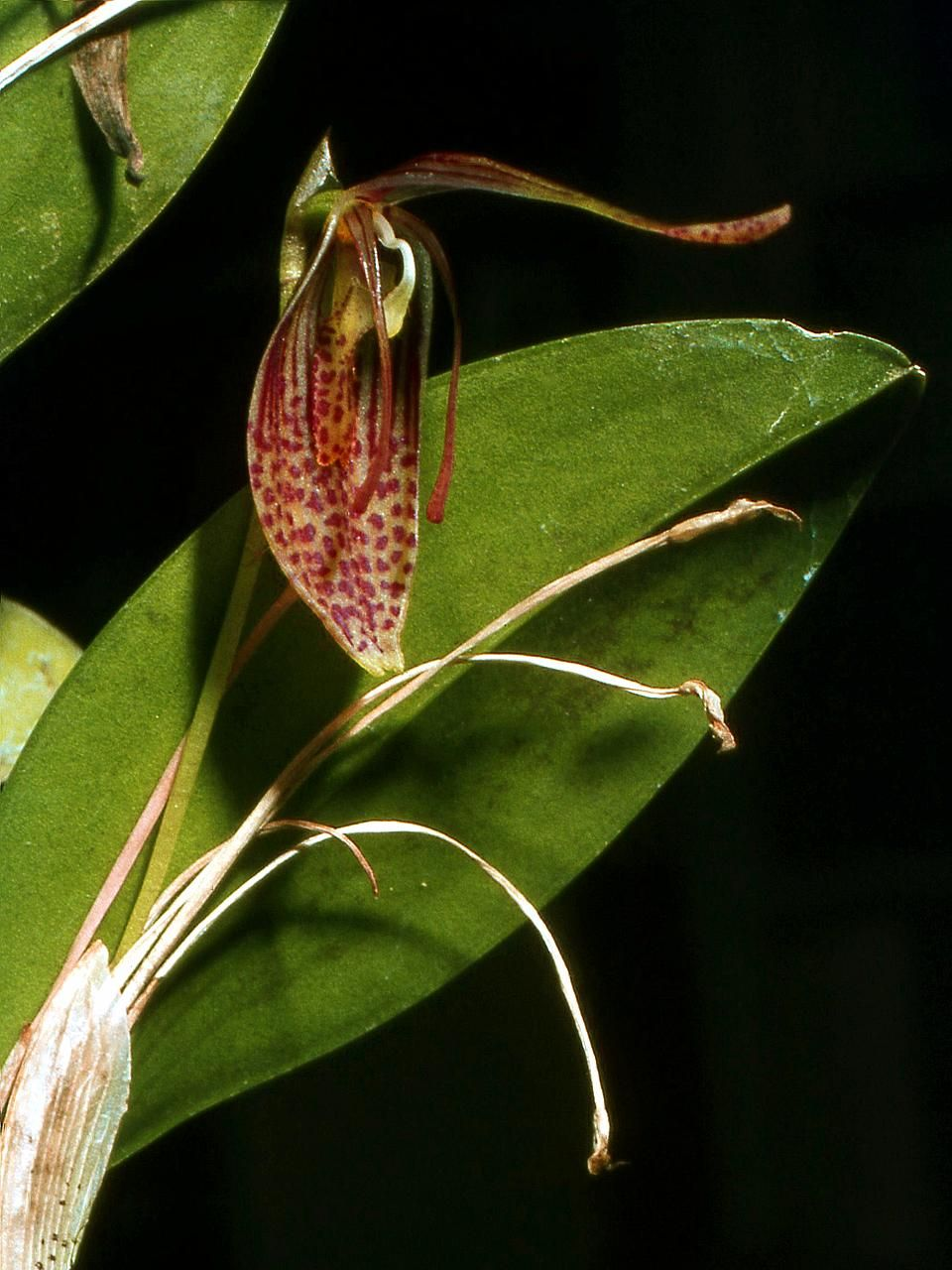
- Flower of Restrepia aristulifera

Scientific classification
- Kingdom: Plantae
- Clade: Tracheophytes
- Clade: Angiosperms
- Clade: Monocots
- Order: Asparagales
- Family: Orchidaceae
- Subfamily: Epidendroideae
- Genus: Restrepia
- Species: R. aristulifera

Binomial name
- Restrepia aristulifera Garay & Dunst.

= Restrepia aristulifera =

Species of orchid

Restrepia aristulifera is a species of flowering plant in the Family Orchidaceae. It is endemic to Venezuela.
