= Qosmalyan =

- Municipality
- Location within Azerbaijan
- Coordinates: 38°41′20″N 48°23′34″E
- Country: Azerbaijan
- Rayon: Lerik

Population
  - Total: 854
- Time zone: UTC+4 (AZT)
  - Summer (DST): UTC+5 (AZT)

Qosmalyan (also, Qosməliyon, Gosmalyan, and Kasmal’yan) is a village and municipality in the Lerik Rayon of Azerbaijan. It has a population of 854. The municipality consists of the villages of Qosmalyan, Digah, Lələkəran, Çokərə, Tatoni, and Hivəri. The main village lies on the A323 road.
