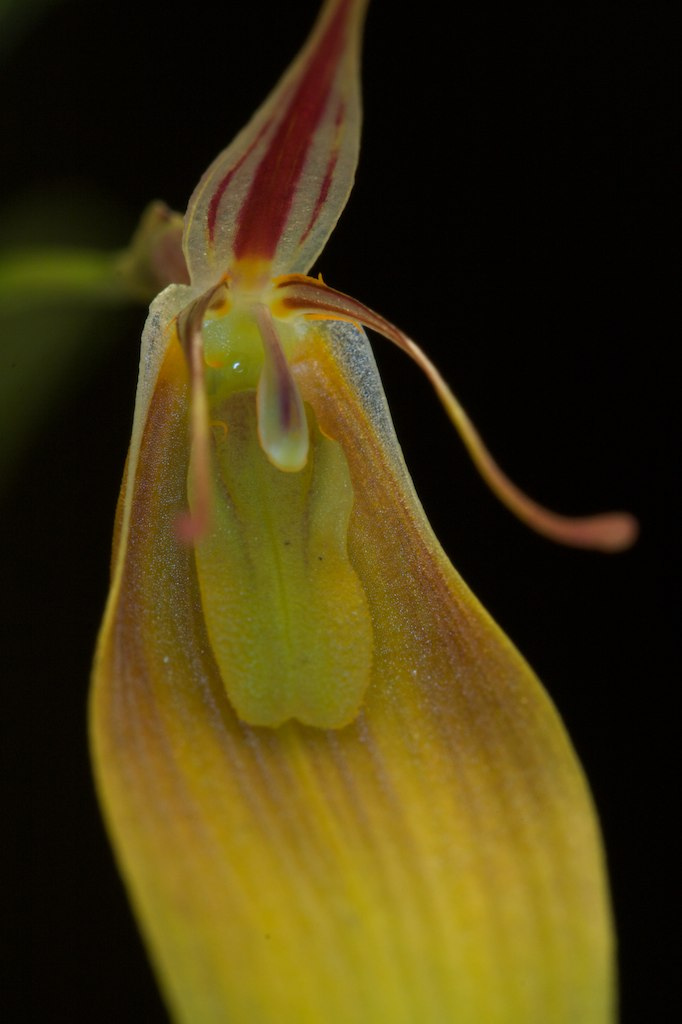

Conservation status
- CITES Appendix II

Scientific classification
- Kingdom: Plantae
- Clade: Tracheophytes
- Clade: Angiosperms
- Clade: Monocots
- Order: Asparagales
- Family: Orchidaceae
- Subfamily: Epidendroideae
- Genus: Restrepia
- Species: R. jesupiana

Binomial name
- Restrepia jesupiana Luer

= Restrepia jesupiana =

Species of flowering plant

Restrepia jesupiana is a species of flowering plant in the family Orchidaceae. It is an epiphyte.

The species is native to the wet tropical biome of Venezuela.

== Taxonomy ==
The species was described by Carlyle A. Luer in 1996.

The holotype was collected in Mérida, Venezuela. It was received from G. C. K. Dunsterville. The specimen flowered when cultivated in Bristol, Connecticut.

== Conservation ==
Restrepia jesupiana is listed in Appendix II of CITES. There are no suspensions or quotas in place for the species.
