= Battle of Baku =

1918 battle in Azerbaijan

- Part of the Armenian–Azerbaijani war in the Caucasus campaign of World War I and the Southern Front of the Russian Civil War
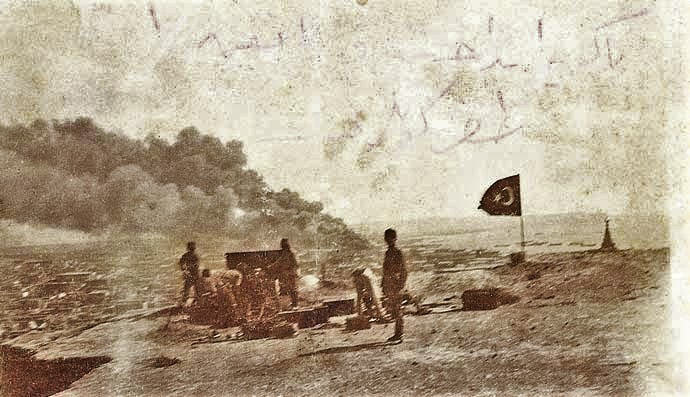
- Ottoman artillery bombarding the city of Baku.
Date	26 August 1918 – 14 September 1918
Location	Baku, Azerbaijan 40°27′N 49°47′E
Result	Central Powers victory

Belligerents
Central Powers: Ottoman Empire; Azerbaijan; Socialists: Mensheviks; Right SRs; During pullout: Right Dashnaks	Until 26 July: Baku Commune; Russian SFSR	From 26 July: Centro-caspian Dictatorship; Armenian Revolutionary Federation; United Kingdom; White Russians (Democratic Republic of Georgia) Georgian volunteers

Commanders and leaders
Nuri Pasha; Mursel Bey; Suleyman Izzet Bey; Ali-Agha Shikhlinski; Nasib Yusifbeyli	Until 26 July: Stepan Shaumian (executed); Grigory Korganov (executed)	From 26 July: Georgy Dokuchaev; Yakov Bagratuni; Lionel Dunsterville; Hamazasp Srvandztyan

Strength
Islamic Army of the Caucasus: 14,000 infantry 500 cavalry 40 guns	Baku Commune: 20,000 (ill-equipped)	Baku Army: 20,000 infantry: 6,000 regulars; 40 guns Dunsterforce: 1,000 infantry 1 artillery battery 3 machine gun section 3 armored cars 2 Martinsyde G.100 planes Bicherakhov detachment: 6,000; Georgian volunteers: 10,000

Casualties and losses
Ottomans: 2,000 killed/wounded	Unknown	Dunsterforce: 200 killed/wounded
- 30,000 Armenian civilians killed

The Battle of Baku (Azerbaijani: Bakı döyüşü, Turkish: Bakü Muharebesi, Russian: Битва за Баку) took place in August and September 1918 between the Ottoman–Azerbaijani coalition forces led by Nuri Pasha and Bolshevik–ARF Baku Soviet forces, later succeeded by the British–Armenian–White Russian forces led by Lionel Dunsterville, and saw Soviet Russia briefly re-enter the war. The battle took place during World War I, was a conclusive part of the Caucasus campaign, but a beginning of the Armenian–Azerbaijani War.

== Background ==
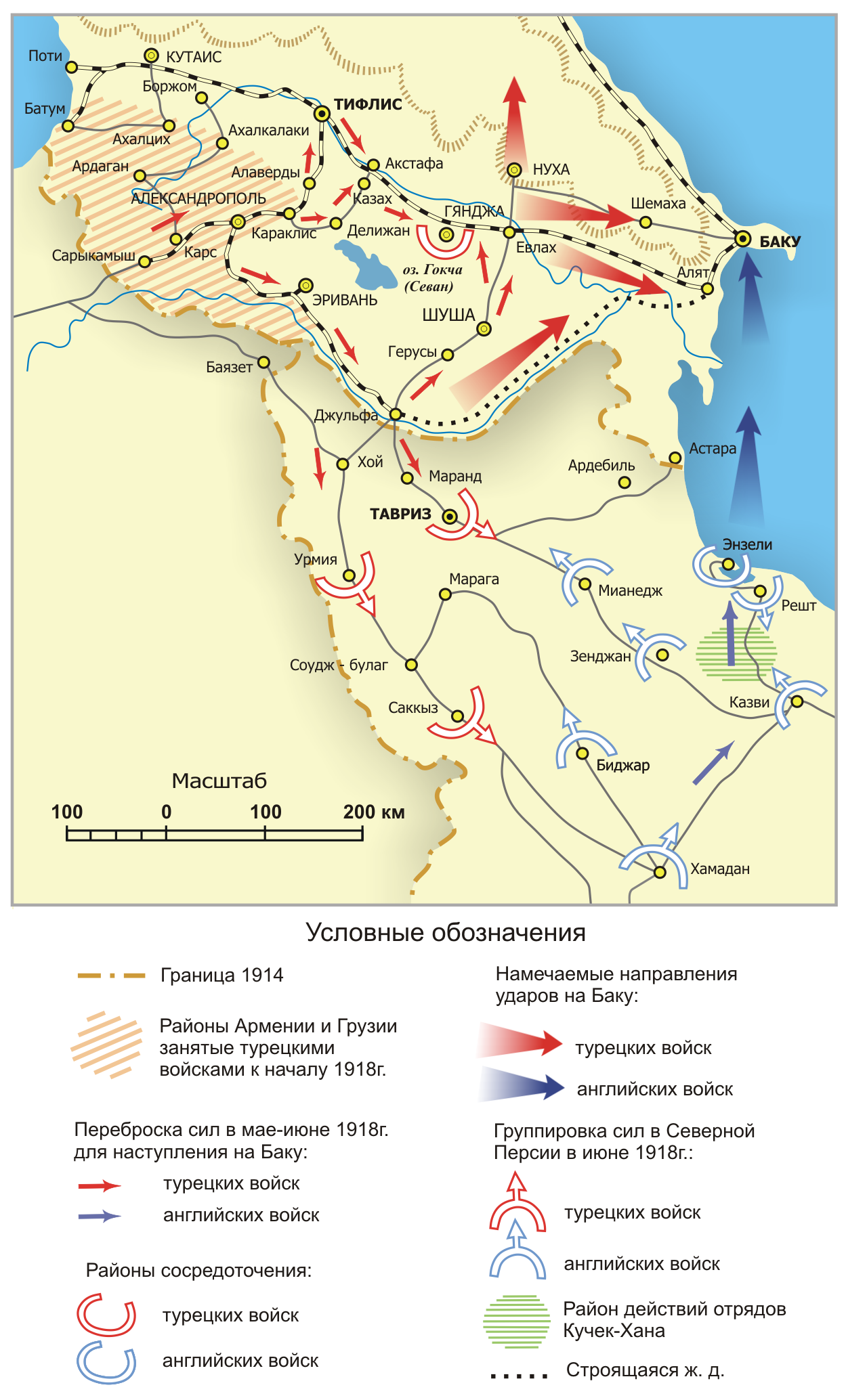
The Ottoman Caucasus offensive in 1918.

In 1917, the Russian Caucasus Front collapsed following the abdication of the Tsar. On 9 March 1917, the Special Transcaucasian Committee was established to fill the administrative gap in areas occupied in the course of the war on the Caucasian front by the Russian Provisional Government in the Transcaucasia. This administration, which included representatives of Armenian, Azerbaijani and Georgian groups, did not last long. In November 1917, the first government of the independent Transcaucasia was created in Tbilisi and named the Transcaucasian Commissariat following the Bolshevik seizure of power in St. Petersburg. On 5 December 1917, this new "Transcaucasian Committee" endorsed the Armistice of Erzincan which was signed by the Russians with the command of the Ottoman Third Army. Russian soldiers mainly left the front and returned to their homes. A number of Russian troops left for the Persian Campaign, contrary to the rules of the Armistice. General Nikolai Baratov remained in Hamadan and at Kermanshah, a Russian colonel named Lazar Bicherakhov remained with 10,000 troops. Both forces were supplemented by British liaison officers.

In 1918, the British invited the Armenians to hold out and picked officers and non-commissioned officers to form an "advisory" force, organizing them under the command of Lionel Dunsterville at Baghdad. It was named the Dunsterforce. The military goal of Dunsterforce was to reach the Caucasus via Persia while the Persian Campaign was active. The British planned to organize an army to be recruited from the Armenians and other pro-Allied elements that still existed in the Caucasus. On 27 January 1918, the British mission set out from Baghdad with officers and instructors to the region. Dunsterforce was ordered to keep the Caucasus-Tabriz front intact and put a stop to Enver Pasha's plans. On 17 February, Dunsterforce arrived at Enzeli, where they were denied passage to Baku by local Bolsheviks, who cited the change in the political situation.

On 10 February 1918, the Sejm of the Transcaucasian Commissariat gathered in Tbilisi and made the decision to establish independence. On 24 February 1918, it proclaimed Transcaucasia independent as the Transcaucasian Democratic Federative Republic. The Transcaucasian Commissariat was anti-Bolshevik in its political goals and sought the separation of Transcaucasia from Bolshevik Russia.

On 3 March 1918, the Grand Vizier Talat Pasha signed the Treaty of Brest-Litovsk with the Russian SFSR. The Treaty of Brest-Litovsk stipulated that the border be pulled back to prewar levels and that the cities of Batum, Kars, and Ardahan be transferred to the Ottoman Empire.

Between 14 March – 13 April 1918, the Trabzon peace conference was held between the Ottoman Empire and the delegation of the Sejm. On 30 March 1918, the news of the internecine conflict and massacre of Azerbaijanis and other Muslims in Baku and adjacent areas of the Baku Governorate arrived. The following days in Baku witnessed inter-ethnic warfare referred to as the March Days. It resulted in the massacre of Azerbaijanis by the Bolsheviks and armed Dashnaks. New York Times Current History mentions the number of victims as 12,000, citing the statements of Azerbaijan representatives that "the Bolsheviks were helped by Armenians, eager to annihilate their old enemies and to seize their property". As a consequence to these events Azerbaijani leaders, who before the "March Days" claimed autonomy within Russia, now demanded independence and placed their hopes no longer in the Russian Revolution, but in support from Ottoman Empire.

On 5 April 1918, Akaki Chkhenkeli of the Transcaucasian delegation to the Trabzon peace conference accepted the Treaty of Brest-Litovsk as a basis for more negotiations and wired the governing bodies urging them to accept this position. The mood prevailing in Tiflis (where the assembly located) was very different. Tiflis acknowledged the existence of a state of war between themselves and the Ottoman Empire. Shortly after, the Ottoman Third Army began its advance and took Erzerum, Kars and Van. The situation was especially dire in the Caucasus, where Enver Pasha had wanted to place Transcaucasia under Ottoman suzerainty as part of his Pan-Turanian plan. This would give the Central Powers numerous natural resources, including the oilfields of Baku. The control of the Caspian would open the way to further expansion in Central Asia, and possibly British India.

On 11 May 1918, a new peace conference opened at Batum. At this conference Ottomans extended their demands to include Tiflis as well as Alexandropol and Echmiadzin through which they wanted a railroad to be built to connect Kars and Julfa with Baku. The Armenian and Georgian members of the Republic's delegation began to stall. Beginning on 21 May, the Ottoman army moved ahead once again. The conflict led to the Battle of Sardarapat (21–29 May), the Battle of Kara Killisse (1918) (24–28 May), and the Battle of Bash Abaran (21–24 May), where Armenian forces halted the Ottoman advance.

On 26 May 1918, the federation dissolved initially with the Georgian declaration of independence (Democratic Republic of Georgia), quickly followed by those of the Armenian (First Republic of Armenia) and Azerbaijan (Azerbaijan Democratic Republic) representatives on 28 May. On 28 May 1918, Georgia signed the Treaty of Poti with Germany and welcomed the German Caucasus Expedition, seeing in the Germans protectors against the post-Russian Revolution havoc and the Ottoman military advances. The government of Azerbaijan moved from Tiflis to Ganja. At the same time, Germany turned to negotiations with the Soviet Russia and offered to stop Turkish advances in return for guaranteed access to Baku's oil. They reached an agreement on 27 August whereby Germany was to receive a quarter of Baku's oil production. The German government requested that the Ottoman Empire delay any offensive into Azerbaijan, which Enver Pasha ignored.

In May, on the Persian Front, a military mission under Nuri Pasha, brother of Enver Pasha, settled in Tabriz to organize the Islamic Army of the Caucasus to fight not only Armenians but also the Bolsheviks. Nuri Pasha's army occupied large parts of the Azerbaijani Democratic Republic without much opposition, influencing the fragile structure of the newly formed state. Ottoman interference led some elements of Azerbaijani society to oppose Turks.

On 4 June 1918, Azerbaijan and the Ottoman Empire signed a treaty of friendship and cooperation, clause 4 of which held that the Ottoman Empire would provide military assistance to Azerbaijan if such assistance was required for maintaining peace and security in the country.

== Prelude ==
The Ottoman Islamic Army of the Caucasus was under the command of Nuri Pasha. It was formed in Ganja. It included the Ottoman 5th Caucasian and 15th divisions, and the Azerbaijani Muslim Corps under general Ali-Agha Shikhlinski. There were roughly 14,000 Ottoman troops with 500 cavalrymen and 40 pieces of artillery. 30% of the newly formed army consisted of Ottoman soldiers, the rest being Azerbaijani forces and volunteers from the North Caucasus.

The Baku forces were commanded by the former Tsarist General Georgy Dokuchaev, with his Armenian Chief of Staff, Yakov Bagratuni. Under their command were about 6,000 Centrocaspian Dictatorship troops of the Baku Army or Baku Battalions. The vast majority of the troops in this force were Armenians, though there were some Russians among them. Their artillery comprised some 40 field guns. Most of the Baku Soviet troops and practically all their officers were Armenians of Armenian Revolutionary Federation leanings, and often being members of the Armenian Revolutionary Federation. Among them was the fedayee commander Hamazasp, who had fought as a guerrilla leader against the Turks.

The British mission, Dunsterforce, was headed by Major-General Lionel Dunsterville, who had arrived to take command of the mission force in Baghdad on 18 January 1918. The first members of the force were already assembled. Dunsterville set out from Baghdad on 27 January 1918, with four NCOs and batmen in 41 Ford vans and cars. The British troops in battle under Dunsterville numbered roughly 1,000. They were supported by a field artillery battery, machine gun section, three armoured cars, and two airplanes. He was to proceed through Persia (began from Mesopotamian Campaign through Persian Campaign) to the port of Anzali.

Opposing forces

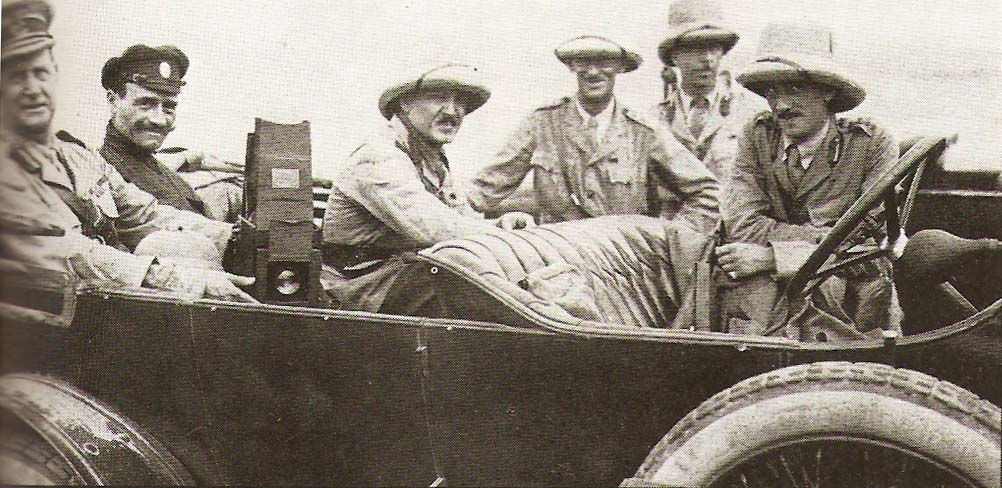
Dunsterville (far left) with Dunsterforce staff.

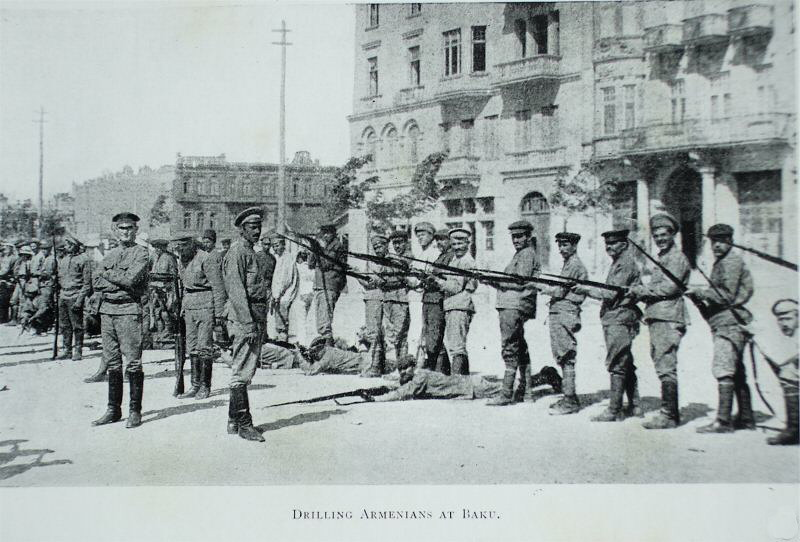
Armenian units drilling in Baku.

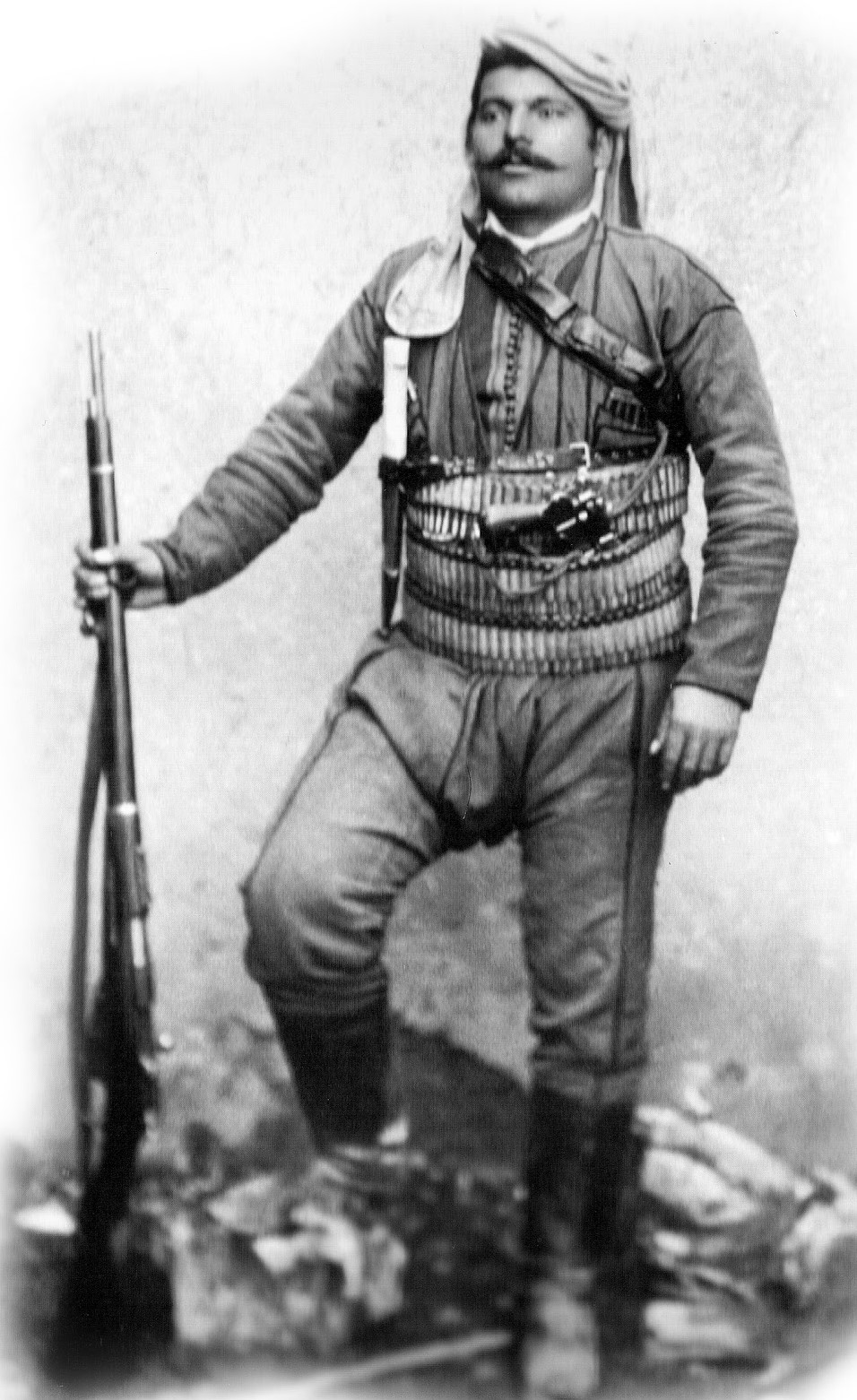
Murad of Sebastia led his volunteers and died at the Battle of Baku

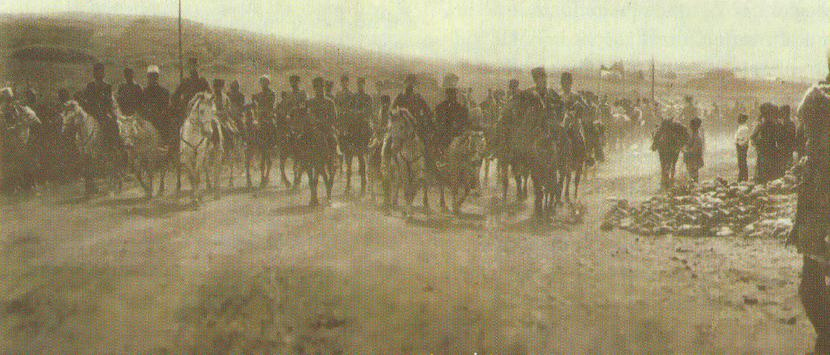
Ottoman Islamic Army of the Caucasus passing through Qazakh

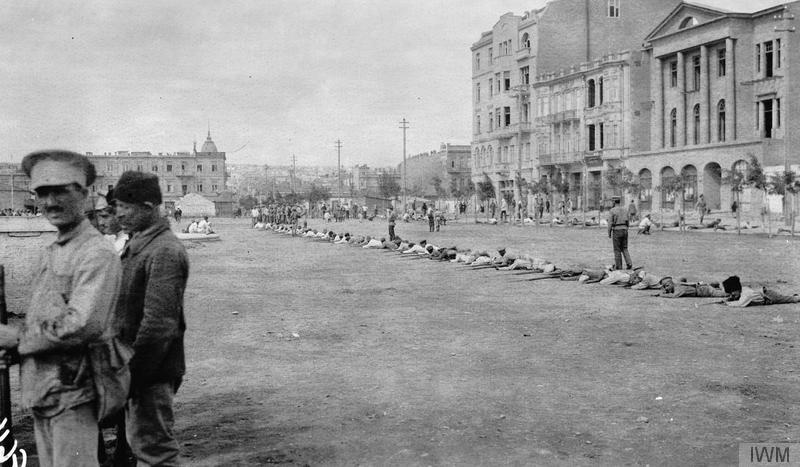
Dunsterforce drilling Centrocaspian Dictatorship troops (modern Sahil Park, Baku)

== Battle ==
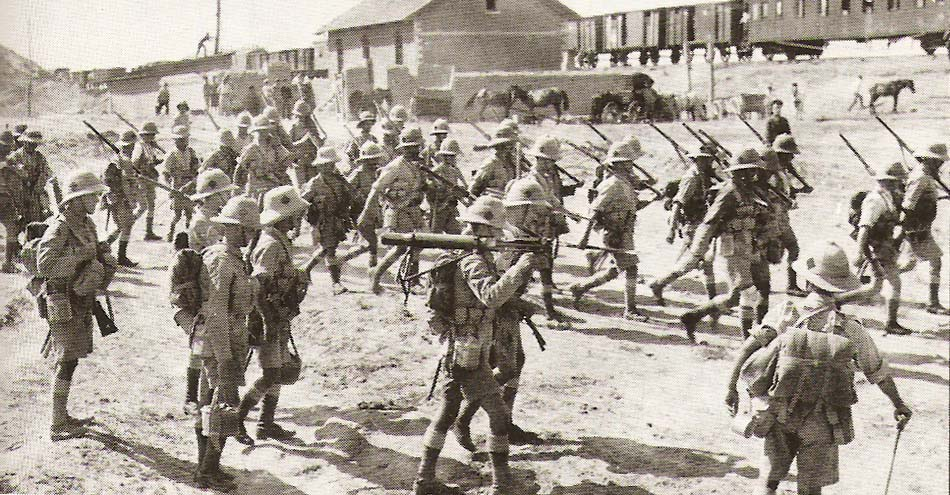
North Staffords, a contingent of the Dunsterforce, on the road to Baku.

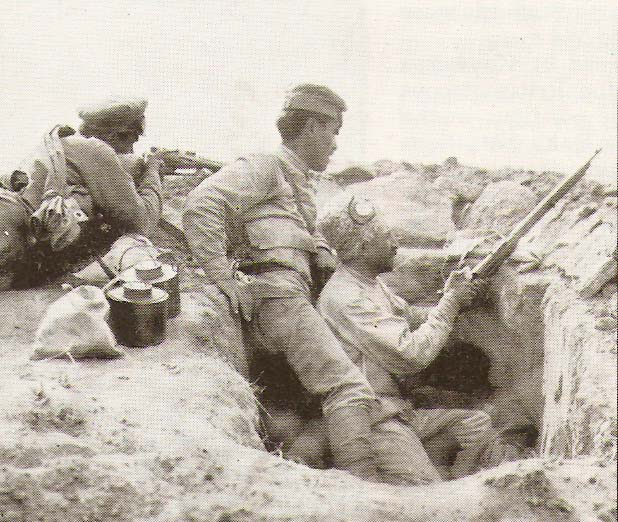
Armenian troops in a trench.

=== Outside city of Baku ===
On 6 June 1918, Grigory Korganov, People's Commissar of Military and Naval Affairs of the Baku Soviet, issued an order to the Red Army to begin offensive operations against Ganja. Being unable to defend the independence of the country on their own, the government of Azerbaijan asked the Ottoman Empire for military support in accordance with clause 4 of the treaty between the two countries. The Baku Soviet troops looted and killed Muslims as they moved towards Ganja. However many of the troops Shahumian requested from Moscow for the protection of Baku did not arrive because they were held up on the orders of Joseph Stalin in Tsaritsyn. Also, on Stalin's orders, grain collected in Northern Caucasus to feed the starving people in Baku was directed to Tsaritsyn. Shahumian protested to Lenin and to the Military Committee about Stalin's behaviour and he often stated: "Stalin will not help us". Lack of troops and food would be decisive in the fate of the Baku Soviet.

On 27 June – 1 July 1918, in the battle near Goychay, the Ottoman Islamic Army of the Caucasus defeated the Red Army and started advancing towards Baku. At this point, earlier in June, Bicherakhov was in the vicinity of Qazvin, trying to go north. After defeating some Jangalis, he proceeded to check the situation in Baku. Returning on 22 June, he planned to save the situation by blocking the Army of the Caucasus at Alyaty Pristan'. However, he arrived too late, and instead went farther north to Derbent, planning to attack the invading army of the Caucasus from the north. At Baku, he left only a small Cossack contingent. Beside the Russians, the Jangalis also harassed elements of the Dunsterforce going to Anzali on their way to Baku. Once defeated, the Jangalis dispersed. On reaching Anzali in late July, Dunsterville also arrested the local Bolsheviks who had sided with the Jangalis.

On 26 July 1918, a coup d'état overthrew the Bolsheviks in Baku. The new body, the Central Caspian Dictatorship, wanted to arrest Stepan Shahumian, but he and his 1,200 Red Army troops seized the local arsenal and 13 ships, and began heading to Astrakhan. The Caspian fleet, loyal to the new government, turned them back.

By 30 July 1918, the advance parties of the Islamic Army of the Caucasus had reached the heights above Baku, causing Dunsterville to immediately send contingents of his troops to Baku, which arrived on 16 August.

On 17 August 1918, Dokuchaev started an offensive at Diga. He planned for 600 Armenians under Colonel Stepanov to attack to the north of Baku. He would further be reinforced by some Warwicks and North Staffords, eventually taking Novkhani. By doing this, they planned to close the gap to the sea, and control a strongly defensible line from one end of the Apsheron Peninsula to the other. The attack failed without artillery support, as the "Inspector of Artillery" had not been given warning. As a result of the failure, the remnants of the force retired to a line slightly north of Diga.

=== City of Baku ===
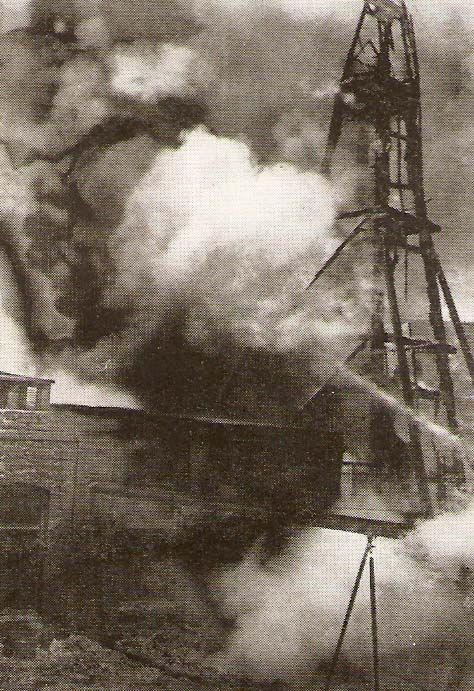
The oil derricks of Baku shelled by Ottoman artillery during the battle.

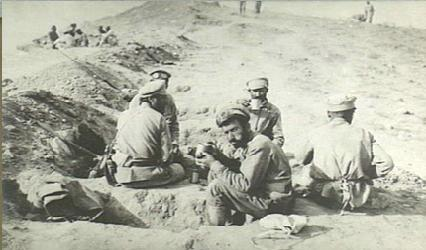
Shortly before the Ottoman attack: Russian and Armenian soldiers near the front line.

While Baku and its environs had been the site of clashes since June and into mid-August, the term Battle of Baku refers to the operations of 26 August – 14 September. On 26 August, the Ottoman Islamic Army of the Caucasus launched its main attack against positions at the Wolf's Gate. Despite a shortage of artillery, British and Baku troops held the positions against the Army of the Caucasus. Following the main assault, the Ottoman forces also attacked Binagadi Hill farther north but also failed. After these attacks, reinforcements were sent to the Balajari station, from where they held the heights to the north. However, faced with increased artillery fire from Ottoman forces, they retired to the railway line.

Over the period 28–29 August, the Ottoman forces shelled the city heavily and attacked the Binagadi Hill position. 500 Ottoman soldiers in close order charged up the hill but were repulsed with the help of artillery. However, the under-strength British troops were forced to retire to positions further south.

29 August– 1 September, the Ottoman forces managed to capture the positions of Binagadi Hill and Diga. Several coalition units were overrun, and losses were heavy. By this point, allied troops were pushed back to the saucer-like position that made up the heights surrounding Baku. However, Ottoman losses were so heavy that Mürsel Bey was not immediately able to continue his offensive. This gave the Baku Army invaluable time to reorganize. Faced with an ever-worsening situation, Dunsterville organized a meeting with the Centrocaspian Dictators on 1 September. He said that he was not willing to risk more British lives and hinted at his withdrawal. However, the dictators protested that they would fight to the bitter end, and the British should leave only when troops of the Baku Army did. Dunsterville decided to stay until the situation became hopeless. Meanwhile, Bicherakhov captured Petrovsk, allowing him to send help to Baku. The reinforcements consisting of 600 men from his force, including Cossacks, raised hope.

1–13 September, the Ottoman forces did not attack. During this period, the Baku force prepared itself and sent out airplane patrols constantly. In his diary, Dunsterville reported the atrocities against the Muslim population perpetrated by Armenian militants. On 12 September, an Arab officer from the Ottoman 10th Division deserted, giving information suggesting the main assault would take place on 14 September.

On the night of 13/14 September, the Ottoman forces began their attacks. The Ottoman forces nearly overran the strategic Wolf's Gate (Azerbaijani: Qurd qapısı) west of Baku, from which the whole battlefield could be seen. However, their advance was halted by a counterattack. The fighting continued for the rest of the day, and the situation eventually became hopeless. By the night of 14 September, the remnants of the Baku Army and Dunsterforce evacuated the city for Anzali.

On 30 October the Armistice of Mudros was signed by the Ottoman Empire. Ottoman forces left the city.

=== Atrocities ===
==== March days ====
On 9 March 1918, the arrest of General Talyshinski, the commander of the Azerbaijani division, and some of its officers all of whom arrived in Baku increased the anti-Soviet feelings among the city's Azerbaijani population. On 30 March, based on the unfounded report that the Azerbaijani (Muslim) crew of the ship Evelina was armed and ready to revolt against the Soviet, the Soviet disarmed the crew who tried to resist. The three days of inter-ethnic warfare referred to as the March Days, resulted in the massacre of up to 2,500 Armenians by Azerbaijanis and up to 12,000 Azerbaijanis by the Bolsheviks and armed Armenian units in the city of Baku and other locations in the Baku Governorate. The March events, beyond the violent three-day period, touched off a series of massacres all over Azerbaijan.

==== September days ====
In September 1918, a terrible panic in Baku ensued when the Ottoman Islamic Army of the Caucasus began to enter the city. Armenians crowded the harbour in a frantic effort to escape. Regular Ottoman troops and locally recruited Azerbaijani soldiers massacred up to 30,000 Armenian civilians in several days as revenge for the massacre of Azerbaijanis few months earlier. It was the last major massacre of World War I.

==== German reactions ====
During the German Caucasus expedition, the Germans and the Turks almost went to war. The Germans witnessed the September Days, as well as other atrocities by Turks against Christians. Having already witnessed the Armenian genocide and its aftermath, it had become clear by 1918 that the Germans had been at the end of their rope and had unanimously become anti-Turkish.

German officer Ernst Paraquin was so enraged about the atrocities that he screamed in the face of Nuri Pasha, despite being in the presence of other Turkish officers, and held him directly responsible for the massacres. This caused Paraquin to get sacked by Turkish authorities; Halil Kut hinted to Paraquin that if he continued talking about the massacres, he would get court-martialed and hanged.

Friedrich Freiherr Kress von Kressenstein and other German military officers also felt disgusted and tried to help victims. German units offered help to Armenian refugees, while Kress von Kressenstein informed his superiors that the Turks are resolved on destroying the remnants of the Armenians by a new method: encirclement, blockage, and mass starvation. He directly appealed to the German Foreign Office, calling for direct intervention. He wrote that it is "deeply shameful that the war situation forced us to cooperate with such beasts like the Turks and that we could not stand up to them in a way humanity would have compelled us to do". He pled for the "rescue [of] half a million Christians from certain starvation" and note that "Public opinion and history would judge us guilty for the annihilation of the Armenians".

Otto von Lossow twice, in May and September, explicitly warned his superiors that Turkish military leaders were aiming at "the total extermination of the Russian Armenians in the Transcaucasus". He dismissed Turkish claims of an alleged "Armenian danger" and "military necessity measures" as nonsensical; he blamed Turkish generals Mehmet Esat Pasha, Yakup Şevki Pasha, and Nuri Pasha as responsible for the spread of that type of disinformation, used for "justifying the mass murder".

== Aftermath ==
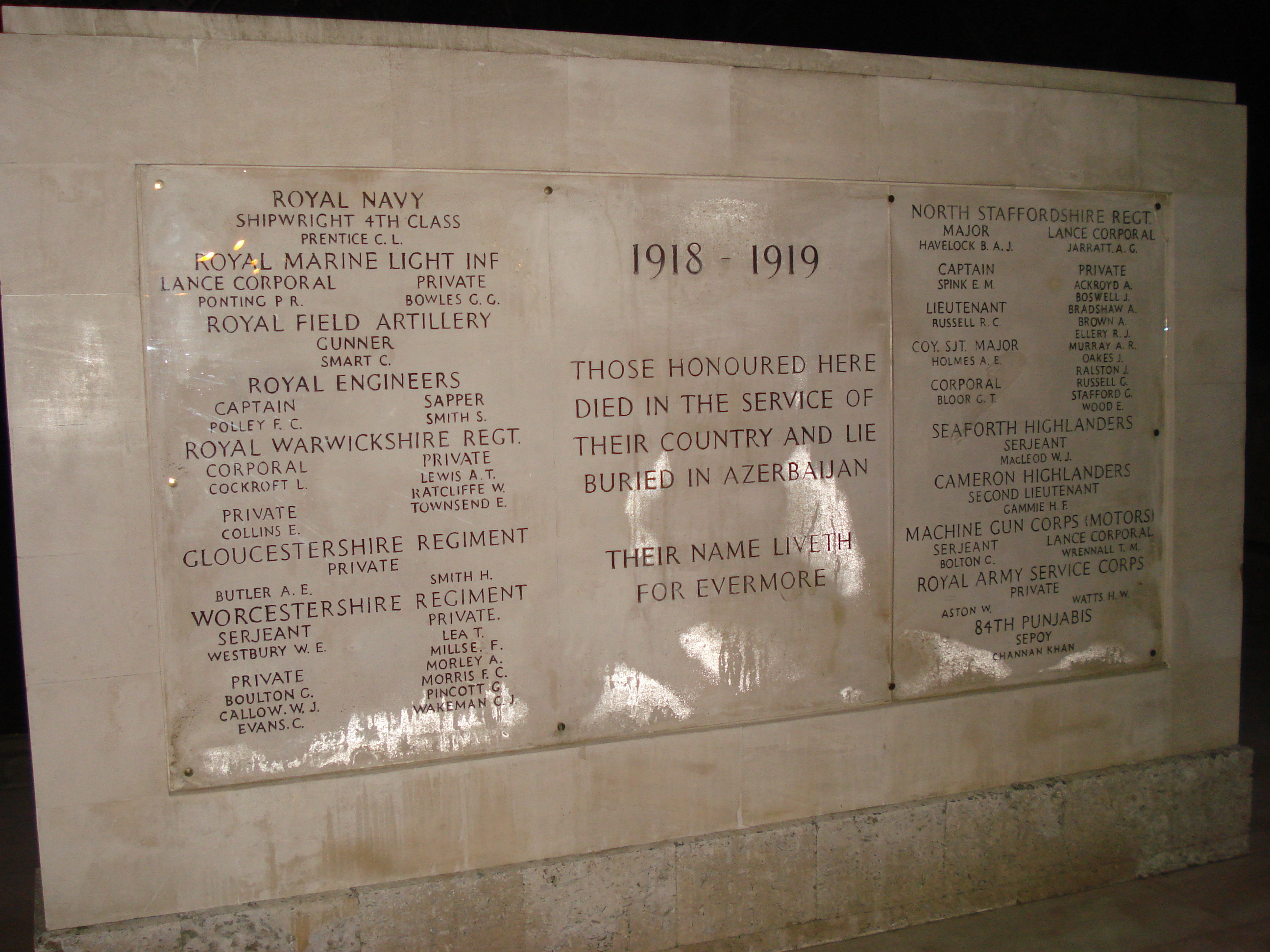
Memorial to the British soldiers in Baku.

The British losses in the battle totalled about 200 men and officers killed, missing or wounded. Mürsel Bey admitted Ottoman losses of around 2,000. Among the civilian casualties, between 10,000 to 30,000 ethnic Armenians of Baku's Armenian community of 80,000 were massacred in what is called the September Days, in relation to Azerbaijani military and civilian deaths by Armenians and Bolsheviks during the March Days. Altogether up to 30,000 Armenians were killed and the rest of the population deported.

The capital of Azerbaijan was finally moved from Ganja to Baku. However, after the Armistice of Mudros between the United Kingdom and the Ottoman Empire on 30 October, Turkish troops were substituted by the Triple Entente. Headed by General William Thomson, British troops of 5,000 soldiers, including parts of Dunsterforce, arrived in Baku on 17 November, and martial law was implemented on the capital of Azerbaijan Democratic Republic until "the civil power would be strong enough to release the forces from the responsibility to maintain the public order".

No oil from Baku's oilfields got beyond Tbilisi before the Ottomans and Germans signed the armistice. By 16 November, Nuri and Mürsel Bey were ejected from Baku and a British general sailed into the city, headed by one of the ships that had evacuated on the night of 14 September.

== Legacy ==
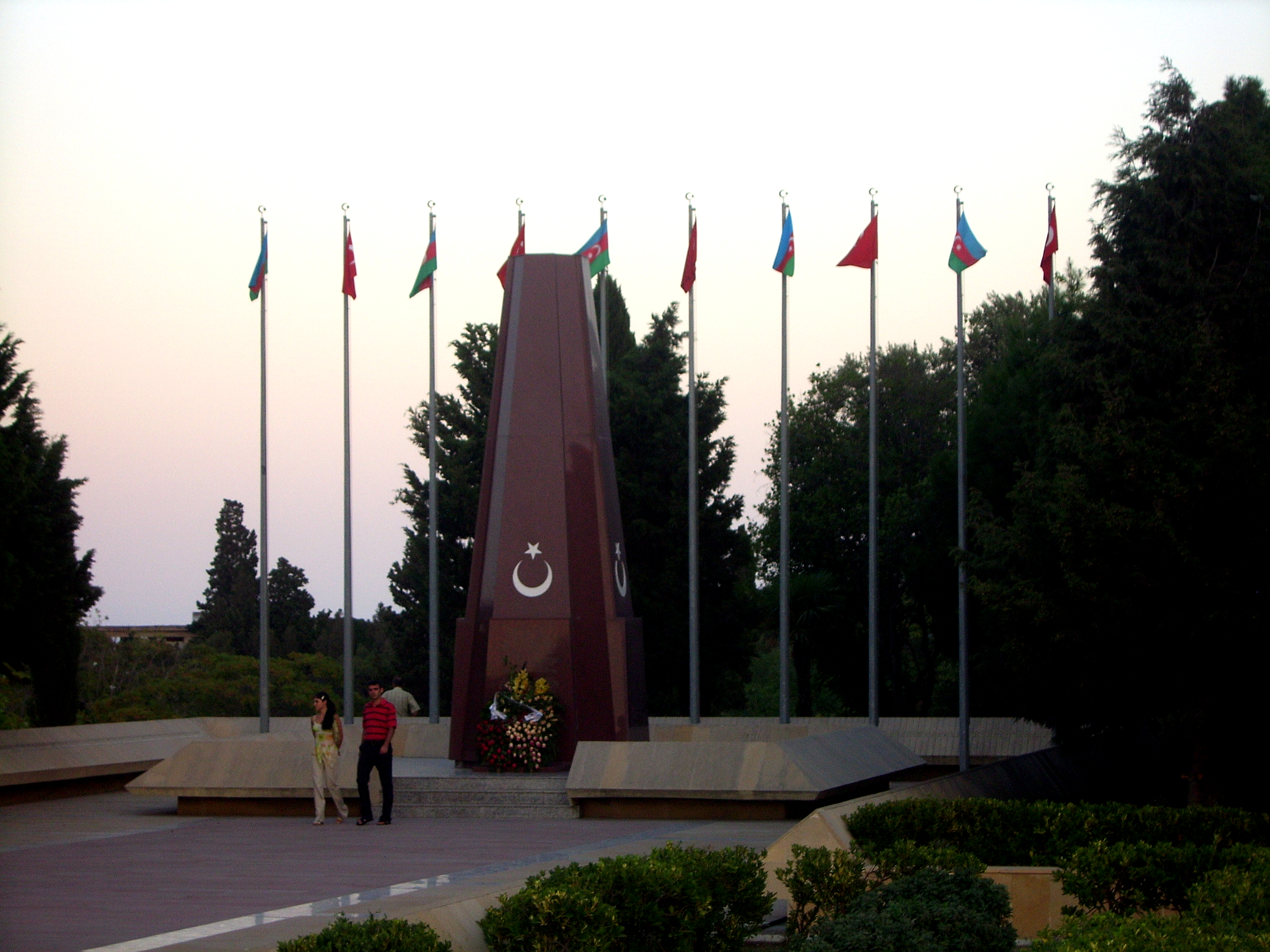
Memorial in Baku to the Ottoman soldiers who were killed in combat.

A memorial in Baku was established to the Ottoman soldiers, who were killed in combat. There is also a memorial to the British soldiers in Baku.

The battle is considered by many Azerbaijani scholars to be the most significant event that took place in Azerbaijan's history before its incorporation into the Soviet Union. It also serves as an example for Azerbaijani-Turkish cooperation and friendship in their diplomatic relations.

=== 100th anniversary celebrations ===
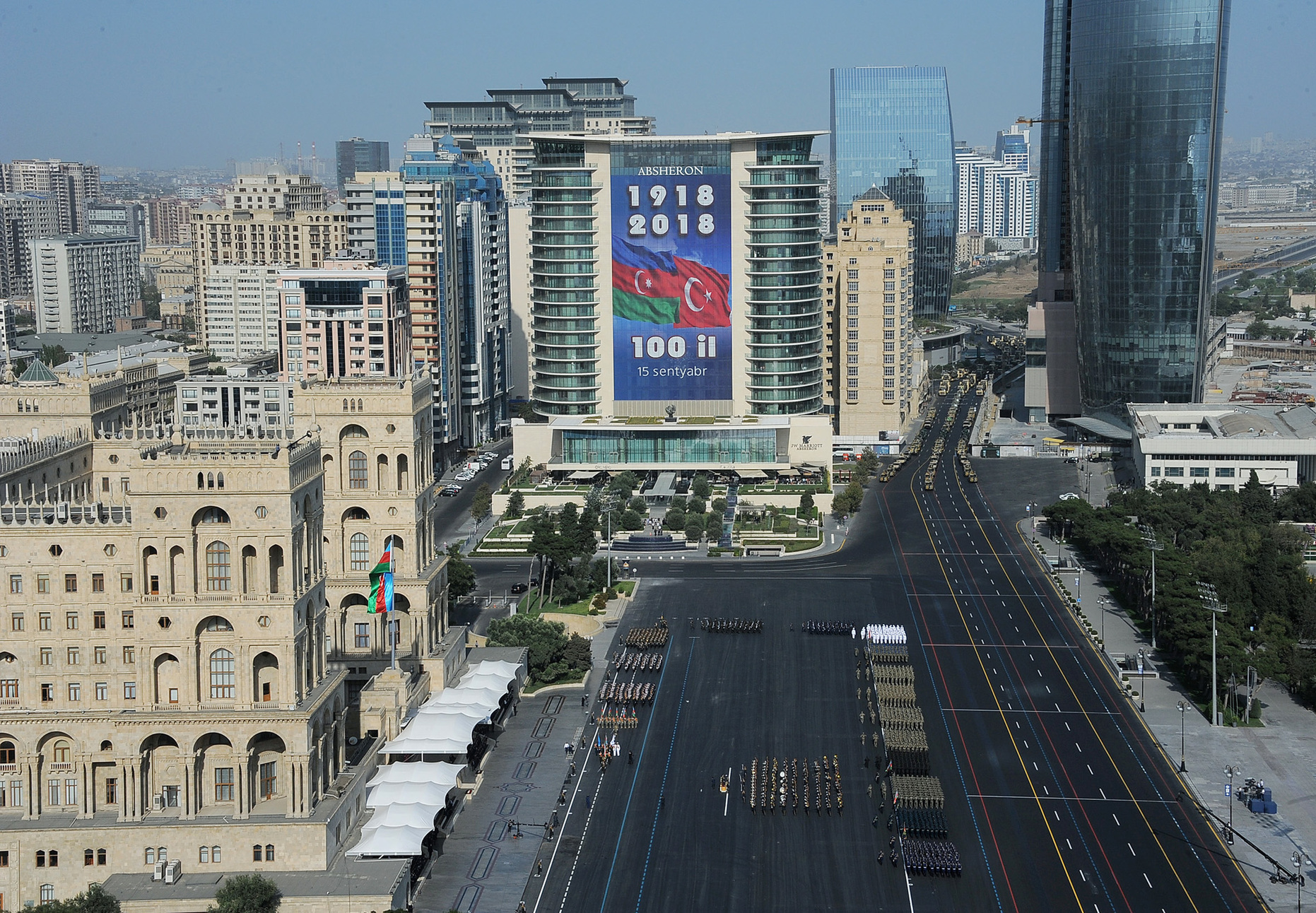
Azadliq Square during the parade.

Azerbaijan and Turkey celebrated the centennial anniversary of the capture of the city (Azerbaijani: Bakının azad edilməsinin 100 illiyi; lit. "100th anniversary of liberation of Baku") from Armenian and British forces. The anniversary was celebrated with a military parade on 15 September 2018 at Azadliq Square, with Turkish President Recep Tayyip Erdoğan and Azerbaijani President Ilham Aliyev being the guests of honor. The parade of the Baku garrison included cadets of Azerbaijani military academies, the Internal Troops, troops of the Land Forces, Air Force, Navy, the State Border Service, the National Guard and a unit of the Turkish Armed Forces. The Turkish Air Force dedicated a video which was published on Twitter to the anniversary. A concert was also held in the Heydar Aliyev Center.

Gallery

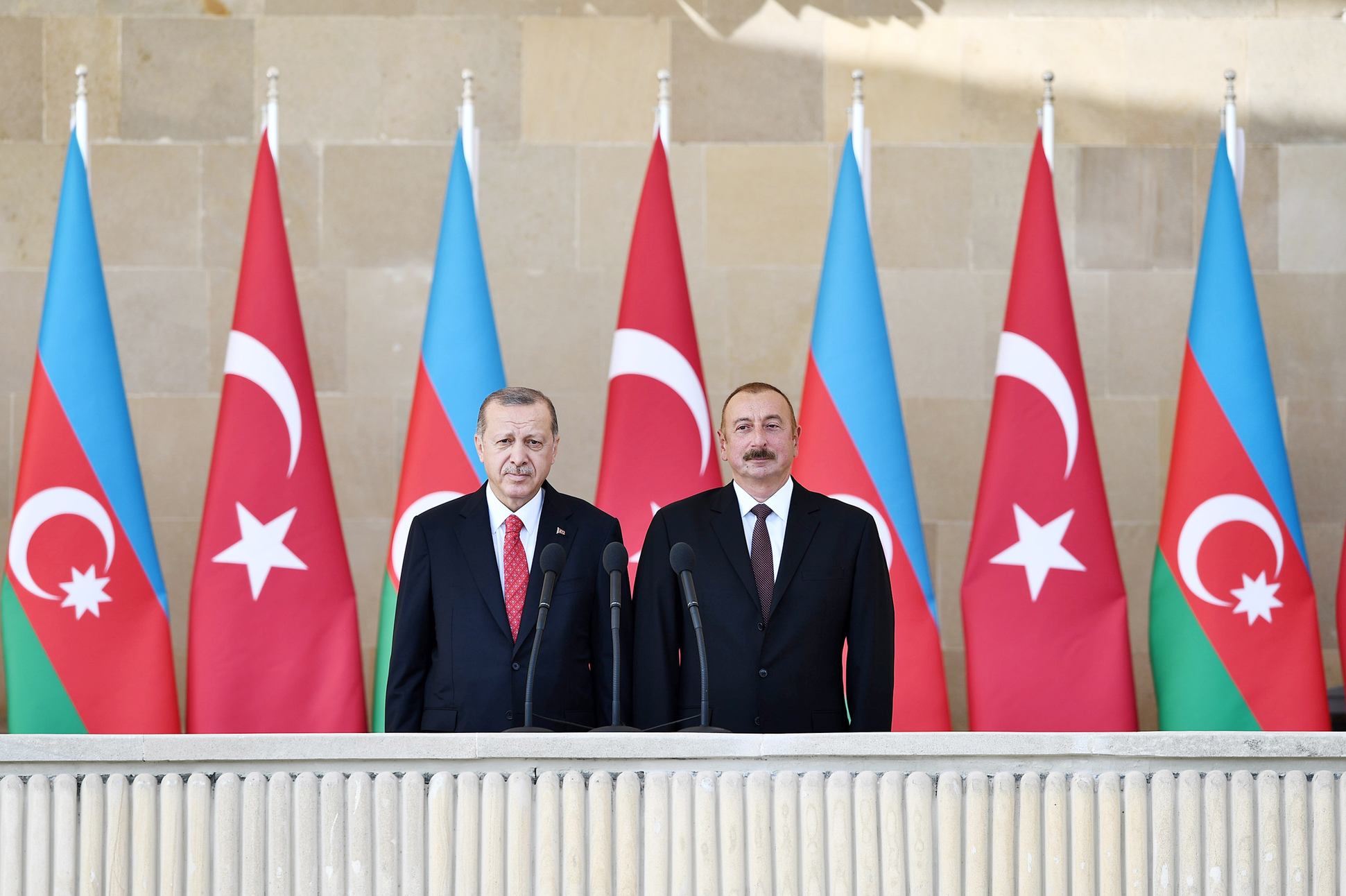
President Erdogan (left) with President Aliyev

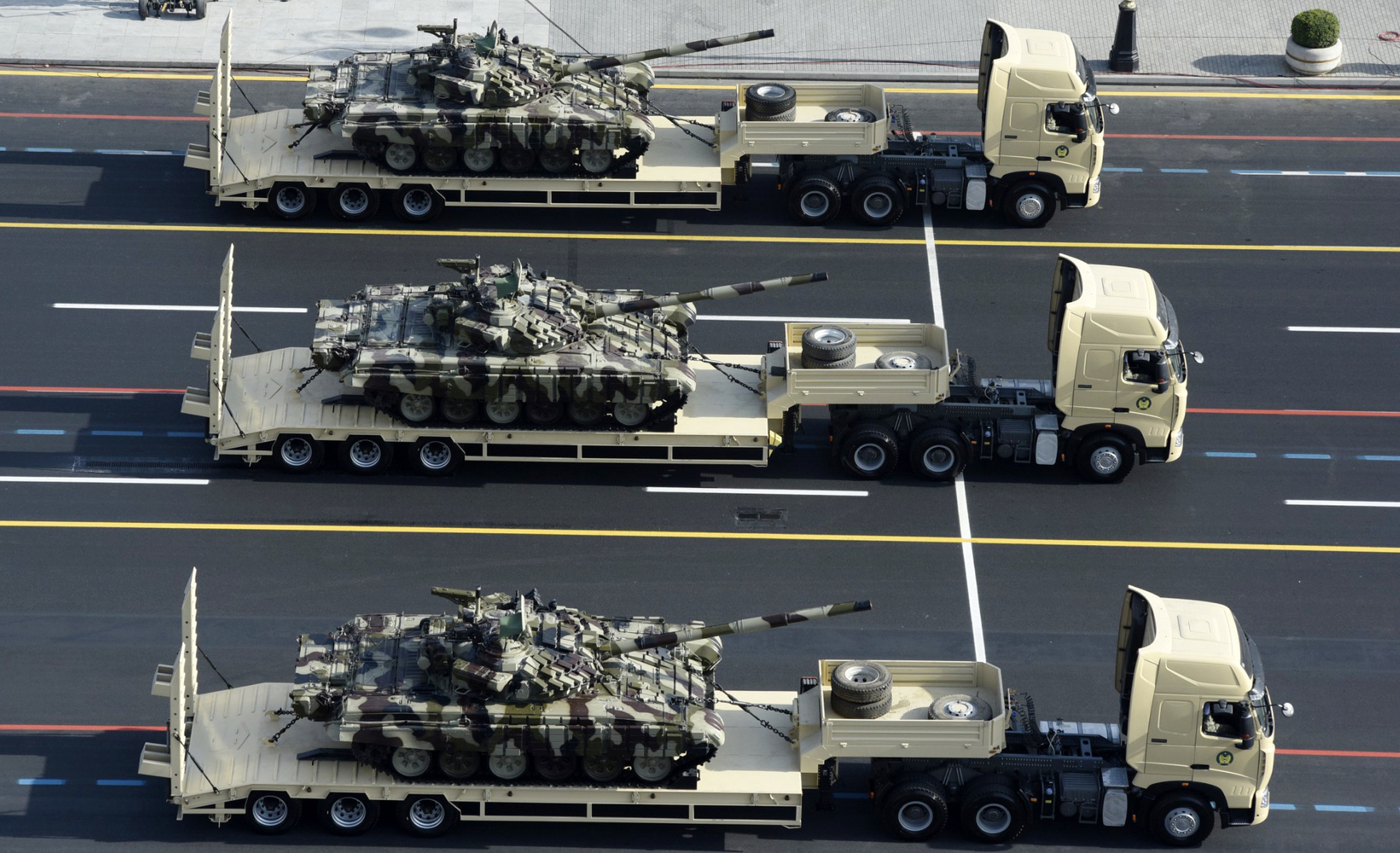
Azerbaijani military hardware

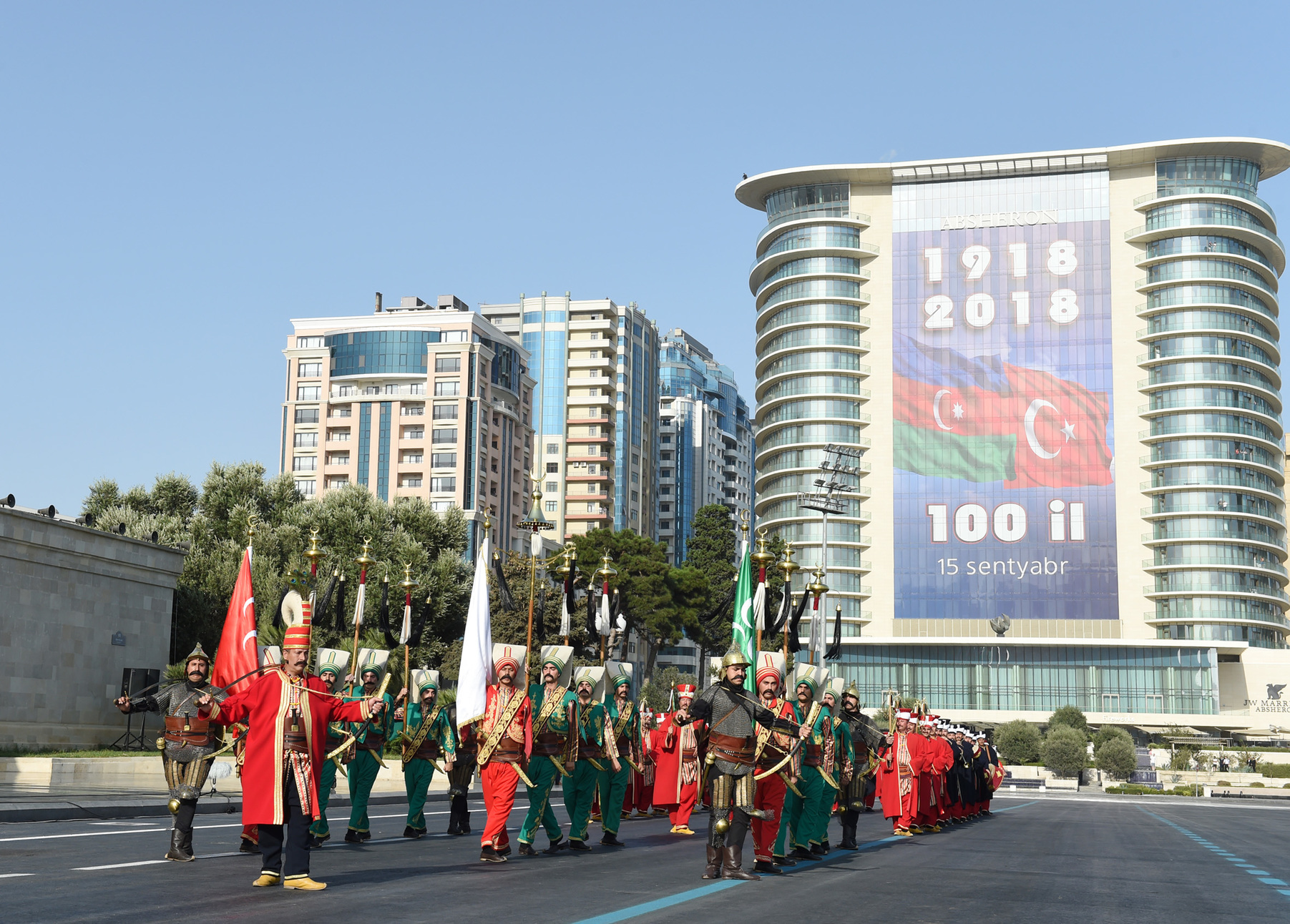
An Ottoman military band

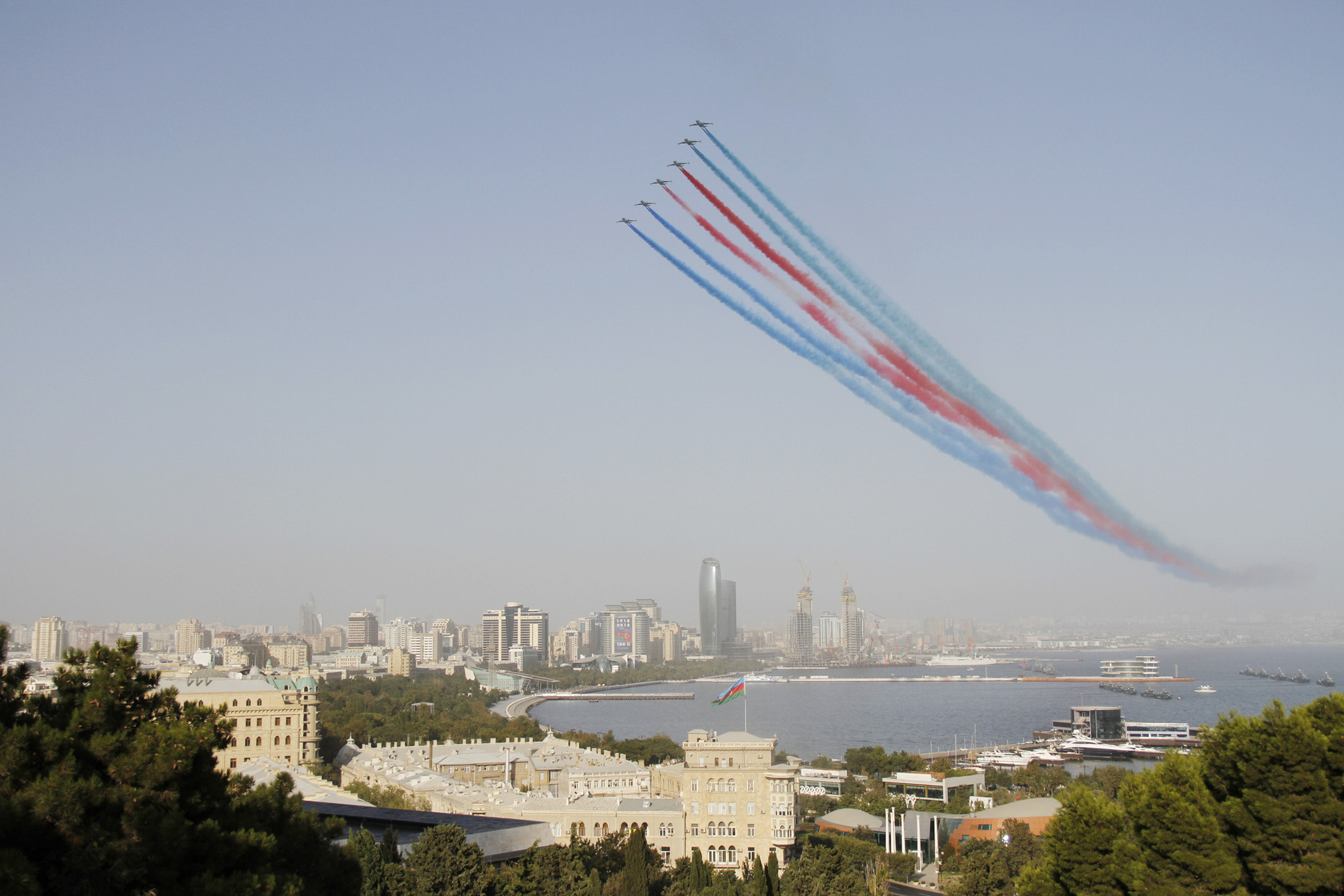
A flypast of the Azerbaijani Air Force

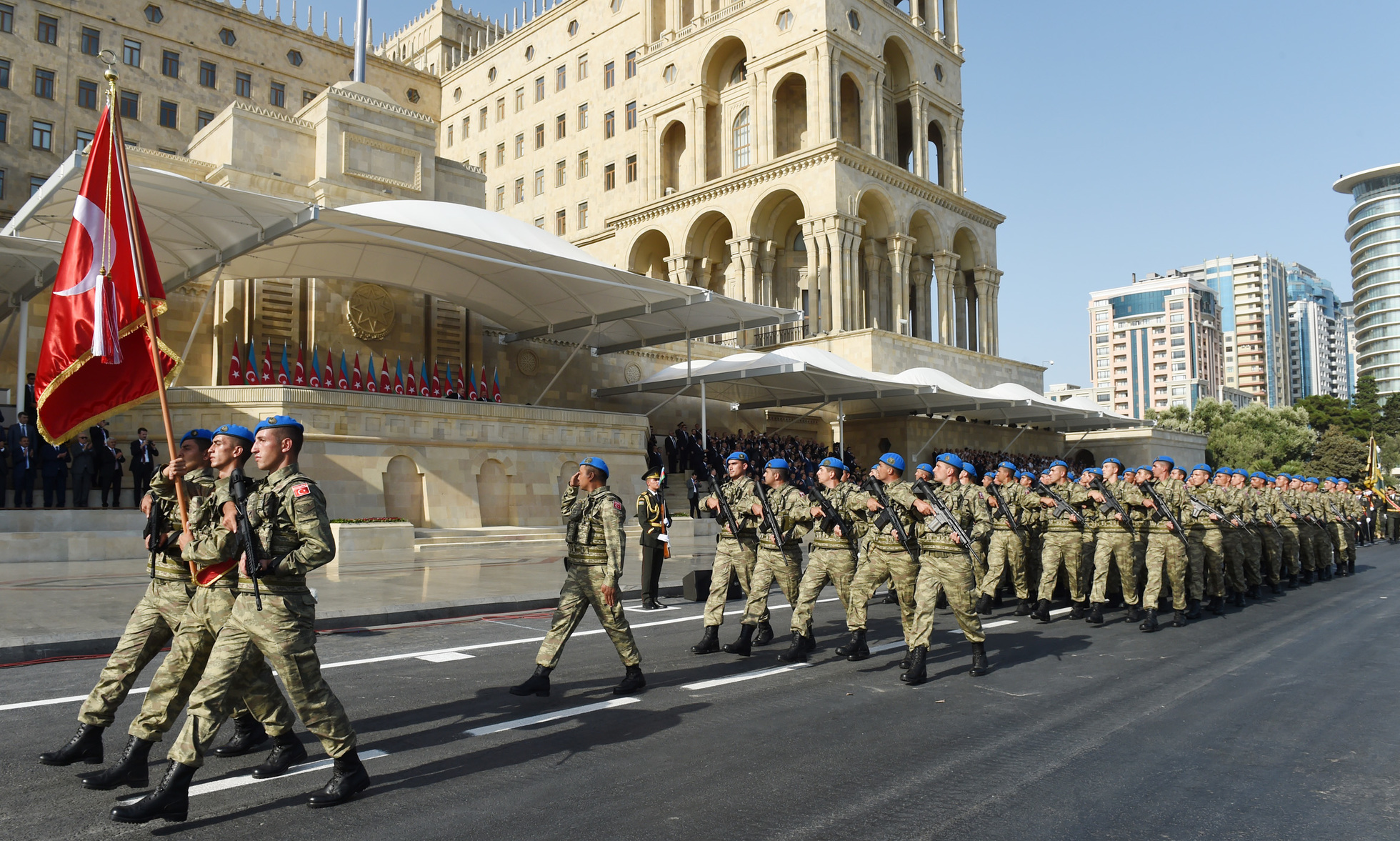
A unit of the Turkish Army

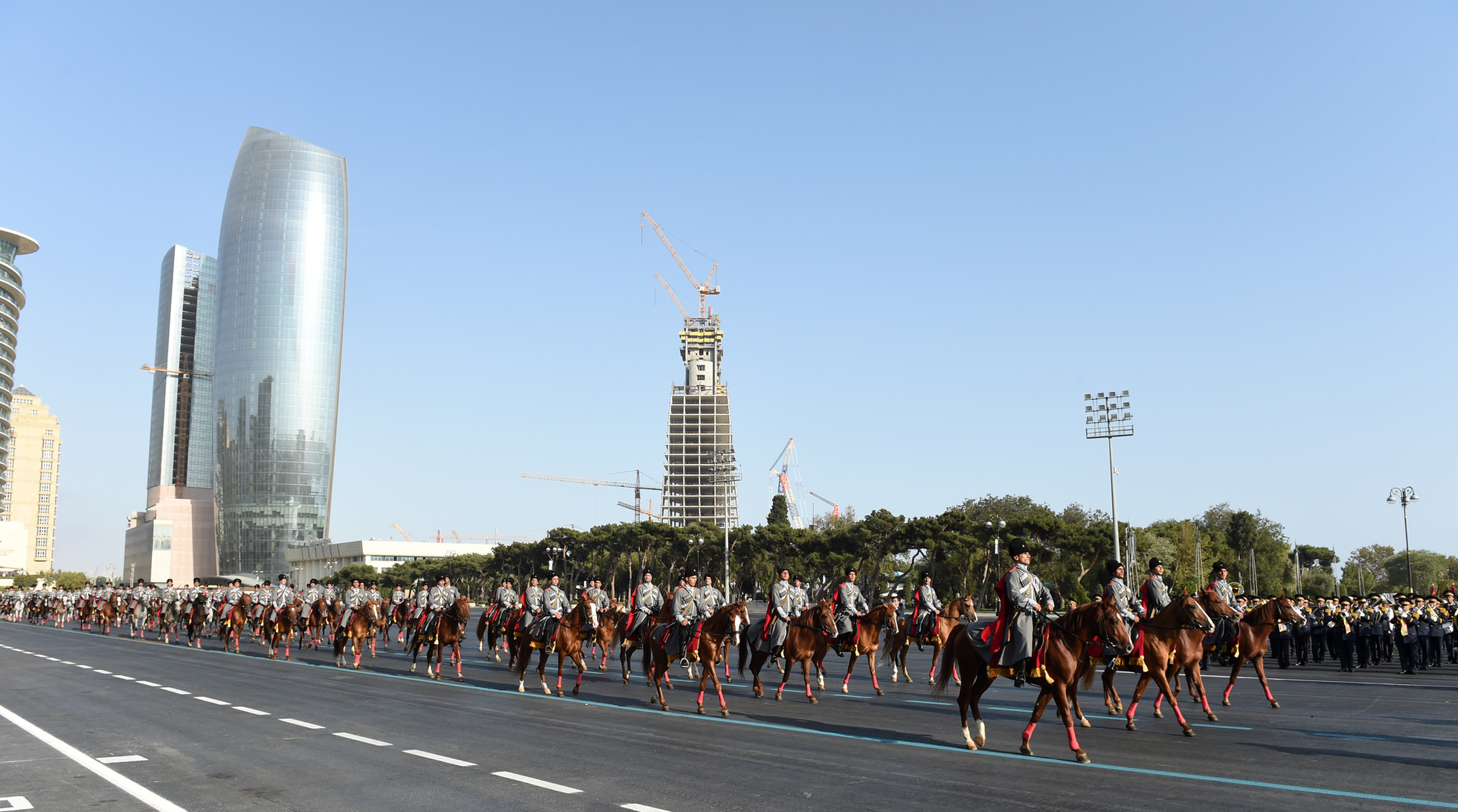
Mounted cavalry

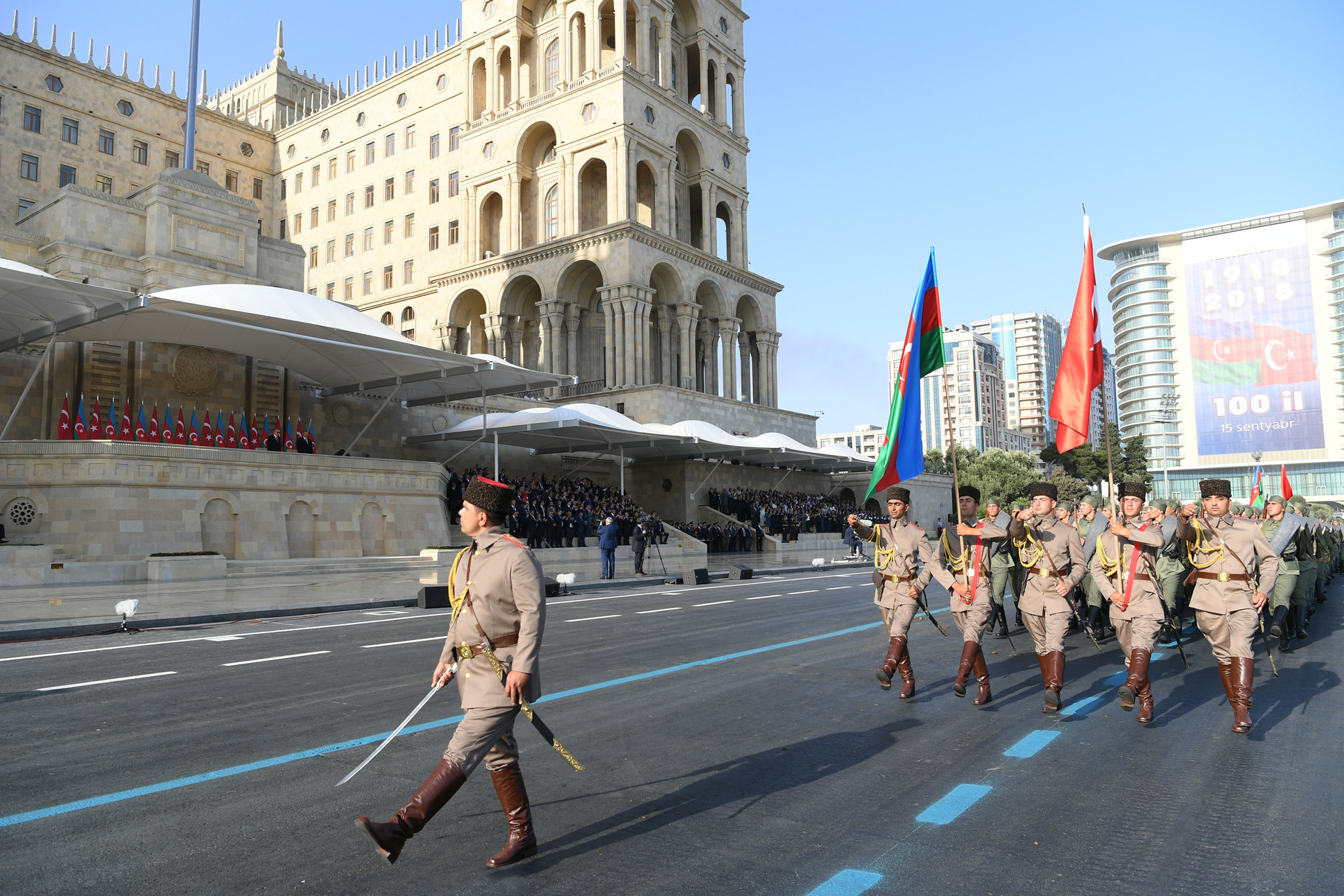
Historical reenactors

== See also ==
- 26 Baku Commissars
- Battle of Binagadi

== Books ==
- Missen, Leslie (1984). Dunsterforce. Marshall Cavendish Illustrated Encyclopedia of World War I. Marshall Cavendish Corporation. ISBN 0-86307-181-3.
- Northcote, Dudley S. (1922). Current History. New York Times Co.
- Pasdermadjian, Garegin (1918). Why Armenia Should be Free: Armenia's Rôle in the Present War. Translated by Aram Torossian. Hairenik Publishing Company.
- Swietochowski, Tadeusz (7 June 2004). Russian Azerbaijan, 1905-1920: The Shaping of a National Identity in a Muslim Community. Cambridge University Press. ISBN 978-0-521-52245-8.
- Chalabian, Antranig (1988). General Andranik and the Armenian Revolutionary Movement. Antranig Chalabian. ISBN 9780962274114.
