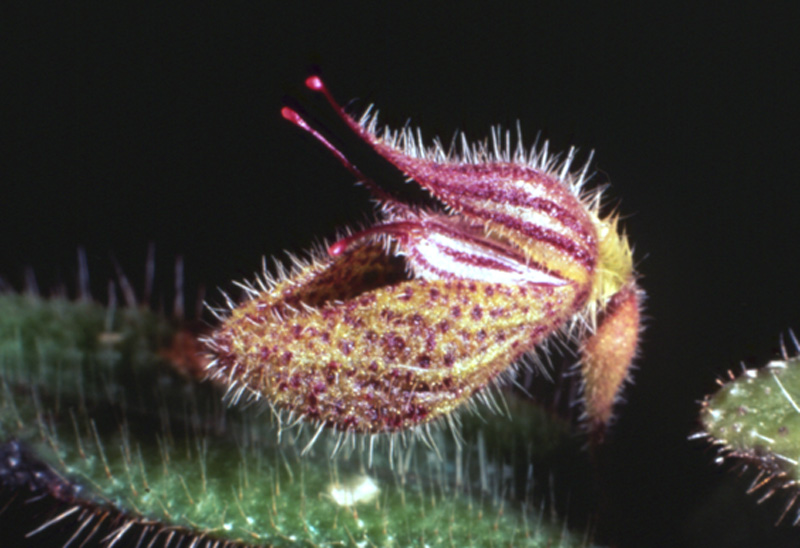

Scientific classification
- Kingdom: Plantae
- Clade: Tracheophytes
- Clade: Angiosperms
- Clade: Monocots
- Order: Asparagales
- Family: Orchidaceae
- Subfamily: Epidendroideae
- Genus: Dresslerella
- Species: D. pilosissima

Binomial name
- Dresslerella pilosissima (Schltr.) Luer

Synonyms
- Pleurothallis pilosissima Schltr. (Basionym); Restrepia pilosissima (Schltr.) Ames & C. Schweinf.; Restrepiella pilosissima (Schltr.) Garay & Dunst.

= Dresslerella pilosissima =

Species of orchid

Dresslerella pilosissima is a species of orchid native to Costa Rica and Guatemala.
