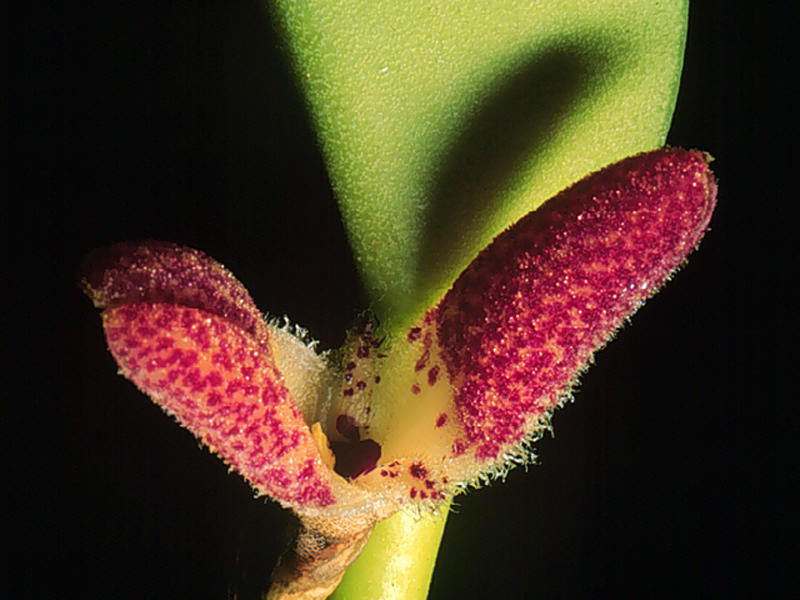
- Snake's head restrepiella (Restrepiella ophiocephala)

Scientific classification
- Kingdom: Plantae
- Clade: Tracheophytes
- Clade: Angiosperms
- Clade: Monocots
- Order: Asparagales
- Family: Orchidaceae
- Subfamily: Epidendroideae
- Tribe: Epidendreae
- Subtribe: Pleurothallidinae
- Genus: Restrepiella; Garay & Dunst.

Type species
- Restrepiella ophiocephala (Lindl. (1838) Garay & Dunst. (1966)

= Restrepiella =

Genus of orchids

Restrepiella is a genus of orchid native to Mexico, Colombia, Florida and Central America.

Restrepiella is morphologically similar to Restrepia, but differs in lacking hairlike attachments on a mobile lip and having four pollinia instead of two.

== Species ==
As of June 2014, three species are recognized:

- Restrepiella guatemalensis Archila - Guatemala
- Restrepiella lueri Pupulin & Bogarín - Costa Rica
- Restrepiella ophiocephala (Lindl.) Garay & Dunst. - Mexico, Central America, Colombia, Florida
