= Stalkya =

Scientific classification
- Kingdom: Plantae
- Clade: Tracheophytes
- Clade: Angiosperms
- Clade: Monocots
- Order: Asparagales
- Family: Orchidaceae
- Subfamily: Orchidoideae
- Tribe: Cranichideae
- Subtribe: Spiranthinae
- Genus: Stalkya; Garay
- Species: S. muscicola

Binomial name
- Stalkya muscicola (Garay & Dunst.) Garay

Synonyms
- Schiedeella muscicola (Garay & Dunst.) Garay & Dunst.; Spiranthes muscicola Garay & Dunst.

Genus of orchids

Stalkya is a monotypic genus of flowering plants from the orchid family, Orchidaceae. The sole species is Stalkya muscicola, endemic to the Mérida region of Venezuela. It is named after the orchidologist G. C. K. "Stalky" Dunsterville.

== See also ==
- List of Orchidaceae genera
