= Çokərə =

Village in Lerik District, Azerbaijan

Coordinates: 38.70134°N 48.31313°E

Çokərə is a village in the municipality of Qosmalyan in the Lerik Rayon of Azerbaijan.
