= Tatoni =

- Location within Azerbaijan
- Coordinates: 38°39′N 48°24′E
- Country: Azerbaijan
- Rayon: Lerik
- Municipality: Qosmalyan
- Time zone: UTC+4 (AZT)
  - Summer (DST): UTC+5 (AZT)

Tatoni (also, Tatonu) is a village in the Lerik Rayon of Azerbaijan. The village forms part of the municipality of Qosmalyan.
