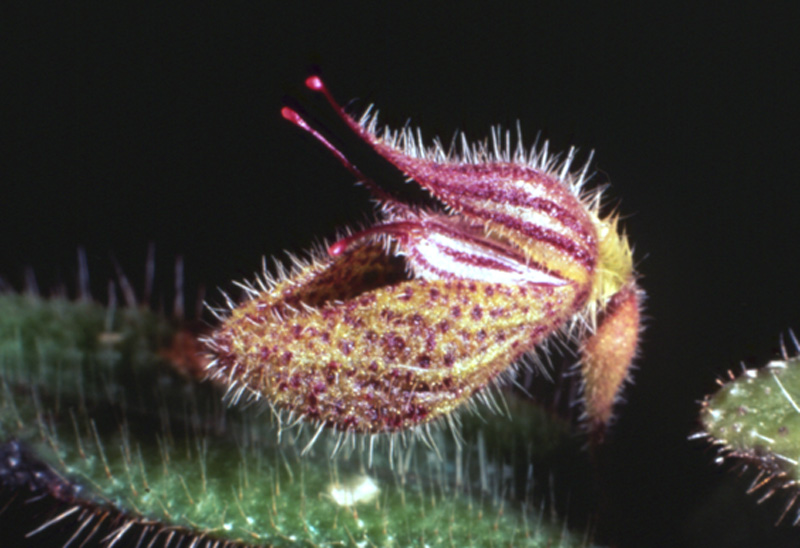
- Dresslerella pilosissima

Scientific classification
- Kingdom: Plantae
- Clade: Tracheophytes
- Clade: Angiosperms
- Clade: Monocots
- Order: Asparagales
- Family: Orchidaceae
- Subfamily: Epidendroideae
- Tribe: Epidendreae
- Subtribe: Pleurothallidinae
- Genus: Dresslerella; Luer (1976)

= Dresslerella =

Genus of orchids

Dresslerella is a genus of miniature orchids, with about 13 species native to South and Central America. The genus is named after orchidologist Robert L. Dressler. Some species are noted to be pubescent.

== List of species ==
1. Dresslerella archilae Luer & Béhar, Monogr. Syst. Bot. Missouri Bot. Gard. 57: 140 (1995).
2. Dresslerella caesariata Luer, Selbyana 2: 185 (1978).
3. Dresslerella cloesii Luer, Monogr. Syst. Bot. Missouri Bot. Gard. 103: 277 (2005).
4. Dresslerella elvallensis Luer, Selbyana 3: 2 (1976).
5. Dresslerella hirsutissima (C.Schweinf.) Luer, Selbyana 2: 185 (1978).
6. Dresslerella hispida (L.O.Williams) Luer, Selbyana 3: 4 (1976).
7. Dresslerella lasiocampa Luer & Hirtz, Monogr. Syst. Bot. Missouri Bot. Gard. 103: 278 (2005).
8. Dresslerella pertusa (Dressler) Luer, Selbyana 3: 6 (1976).
9. Dresslerella pilosissima (Schltr.) Luer, Selbyana 2: 185 (1978).
10. Dresslerella portillae Luer & Hirtz, Monogr. Syst. Bot. Missouri Bot. Gard. 88: 102 (2002).
11. Dresslerella powellii (Ames) Luer, Selbyana 3: 8 (1976).
12. Dresslerella sijmiana Luer, Monogr. Syst. Bot. Missouri Bot. Gard. 88: 103 (2002).
13. Dresslerella stellaris Luer & R.Escobar, Selbyana 2: 188 (1978).
