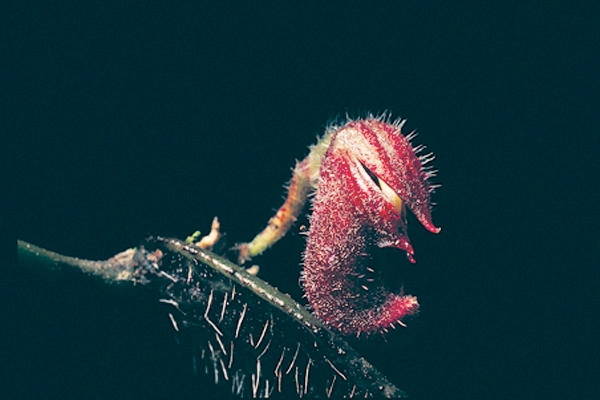

Scientific classification
- Kingdom: Plantae
- Clade: Tracheophytes
- Clade: Angiosperms
- Clade: Monocots
- Order: Asparagales
- Family: Orchidaceae
- Subfamily: Epidendroideae
- Genus: Dresslerella
- Species: D. archilae

Binomial name
- Dresslerella archilae Luer & Béhar

= Dresslerella archilae =

Species of orchid

Dresslerella archilae is a species of orchid endemic to Guatemala. It is named after the american botanist Robert Dressler.
