= Digah, Lankaran =

Digah
- Municipality
- Location within Azerbaijan
- Coordinates: 38°45′41″N 48°49′35″E
- Country: Azerbaijan
- Rayon: Lankaran

Population
  - Total: 2,347
- Time zone: UTC+4 (AZT)
  - Summer (DST): UTC+5 (AZT)

Digah (also, Digyakh and Dygya) is a village and municipality in the Lankaran Rayon of Azerbaijan. It has a population of 2,347.
