= Mürsel Bakû =

Turkish politician

Mürsel Bakû 1316-Sv. 7
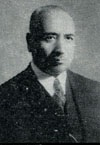
- Born: 1881; Erzurum, Ottoman Empire
- Died: 2 February 1945 (aged 63–64); Istanbul, Turkey
- Burial place: Zincirlikuyu Mezarlığı; State Cemetery
- Military career
- Allegiance: Ottoman Empire; Turkey
- Service years: Ottoman: 1901–1919; Turkey: 3 November 1921 – 23 August 1938
- Rank: General
- Commands: 11th Cavalry Brigade, 34th Division, 2nd Cavalry Division, 32nd Division, 12th Division, 5th Caucasian Division; 6th Cavalry Division, 1st Cavalry Division, VII Corps (deputy), 2nd Cavalry Division, 23rd Infantry Division, Inspector of the Cavalry, Deputy Inspector of the Infantry, member of the Military Supreme Court
- Conflicts: Balkan Wars; First World War; Turkish War of Independence; Turkish capture of Smyrna
- Other work: Member of the GNAT (Kocaeli)

Mürsel Bakû (1881; Erzurum – 2 February 1945; Istanbul) was a Turkish officer of the Ottoman Army and a general of the Turkish Armed Forces. He took part in the Caucasus campaign and commanded a contingent of the Ottoman forces during the Battle of Baku. Following the defeat of the Ottoman Empire in World War I, he was arrested by the British in January 1919, prosecuted for war crimes and deported to Malta as one of the Malta Exiles. After his return from detention in Malta, he joined the forces of Mustafa Kemal Atatürk and took part in the recapture of Smyrna from Greek forces during the Turkish War of Independence in September 1922. He was the general of the Seventh Army, which took part in the defense of Diyarbakır during the Sheikh Said Rebellion in 1924–1925.

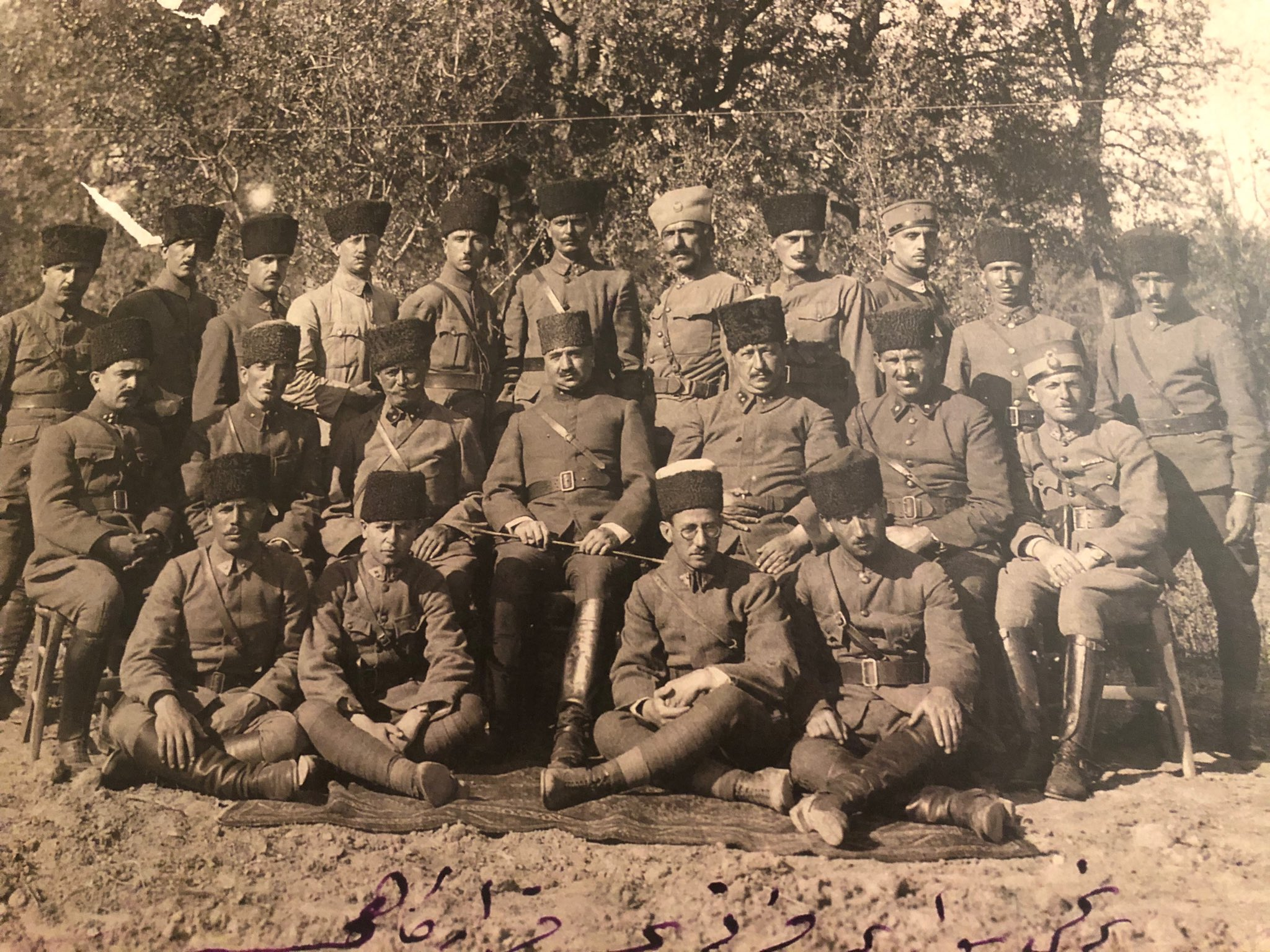
Mürsel Paşa with the Commanding Officers of the 1st Cavalry Division in the summer of 1922 during the last phase of the Turkish War of Independence.

== See also ==
- List of high-ranking commanders of the Turkish War of Independence
