= Digah, Quba =

Digah
- Municipality
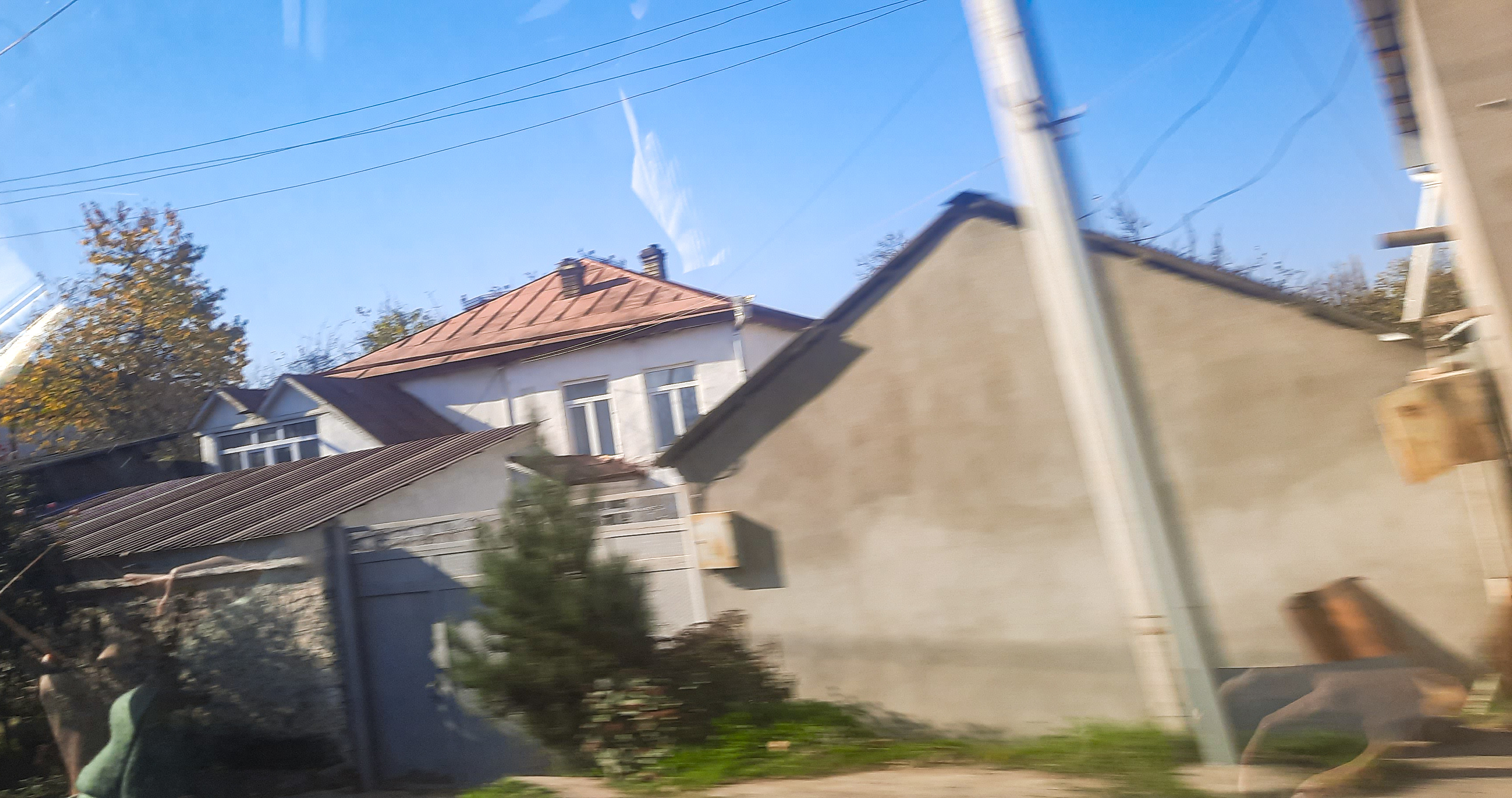

- Location within Azerbaijan
- Coordinates: 41°23′20″N 48°28′28″E
- Country: Azerbaijan
- Rayon: Quba

Population
  - Total: 1,760
- Time zone: UTC+4 (AZT)
  - Summer (DST): UTC+5 (AZT)

Digah also, Lezgi-Digah is a village and municipality in the Quba Rayon of Azerbaijan. It has a population of 1,760.
