= Digah, Lerik =

Human settlement in Azerbaijan

Digah is a village in the municipality of Mistan in the Lerik Rayon of Azerbaijan.
