= Lionel Dunsterville =

British Army general (1865–1946)

Major-General Lionel Dunsterville CB CSI
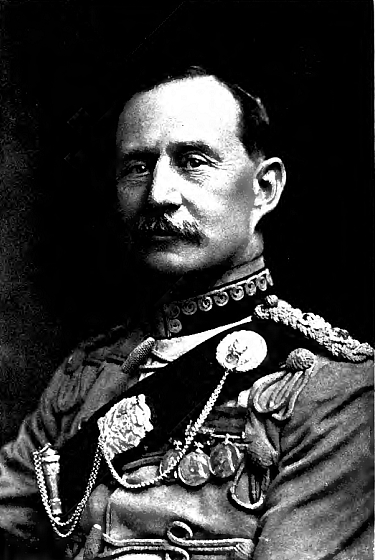
- Born: 9 November 1865; Lausanne, Vaud, Switzerland
- Died: 18 March 1946 (aged 80); Torquay, Devon, England
- Military career
- Allegiance: United Kingdom
- Branch: British Indian Army
- Rank: Major-General
- Commands: Dunsterforce
- Conflicts: Boxer Rebellion; North-West Frontier; First World War; Persian Campaign; Caucasus campaign; Battle of Baku
- Awards: Companion of the Order of the Bath; Companion of the Order of the Star of India

Major-General Lionel Charles Dunsterville (9 November 1865 – 18 March 1946) was a British Indian Army officer, who led Dunsterforce across present-day Iraq and Iran towards the Caucasus and Baku during the First World War.

== Early life ==
Lionel Charles Dunsterville was born in Lausanne, Switzerland on 9 November 1865, the son of Lieutenant General Lionel D'Arcy Dunsterville (1830–1912) of the Indian Army and his wife, Susan Ellen (1835–1875). He went to school with Rudyard Kipling and George Charles Beresford at the United Services College in North Devon. The school prepared boys for careers as officers in the armed services. He served as the inspiration for the character "Stalky" in Kipling's collection of school stories Stalky & Co.. He was also uncle to H. D. Harvey-Kelly, the first Royal Flying Corps pilot to land in France during the First World War.

== Early military career ==
Dunsterville was commissioned into the British Army as a lieutenant in the Royal Sussex Regiment on 23 August 1884.

He later transferred to the British Indian Army, was promoted to captain on 23 August 1895, and served on the North-West Frontier and in Waziristan. As a railway staff officer he served in China during the Boxer Rebellion 1900–02, for which he was mentioned in despatches (by Major-General O'Moore Creagh, commander of British forces in China after the end of the main hostilities), and was promoted to major on 23 August 1902, and colonel on 1 May 1912.

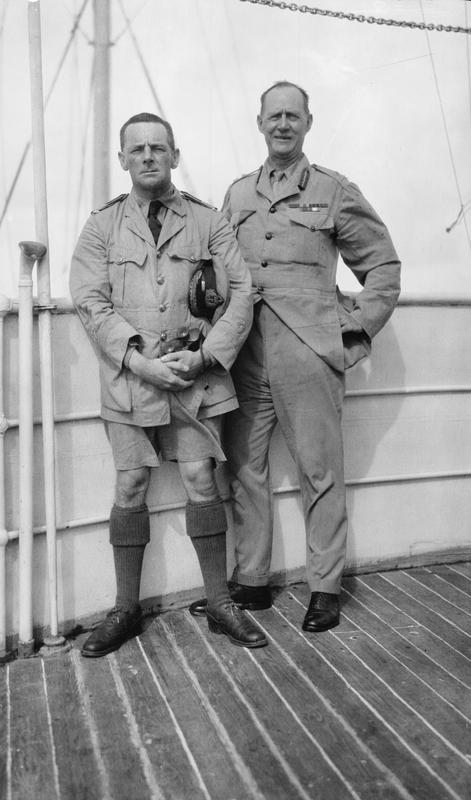
Major-General L. C. Dunsterville, GOC Dunsterforce (right), with Commodore D. T. Norris of the Royal Navy on the Caspian, 1918

== First World War ==
At the beginning of the First World War, Dunsterville held a posting in India. In April 1915 he was promoted to the temporary rank of brigadier general while in command of the Jhelum Brigade.

At the end of 1917 the army appointed then-Major Dunsterville to lead an Allied force (Dunsterforce) of fewer than 1,000 Australian, British, Canadian and New Zealand troops, drawn from the Mesopotamian and Western Fronts, accompanied by armoured cars, from Hamadan in the Zagros Mountains of Persia for some 350 km across Persia. Dunsterville was promoted to major-general in 1918. His mission set out from Baghdad in January 1918, aiming to gather information, to train and command local forces, and to prevent the spread of pro-German propaganda. On his way to Bandar-e Anzali on the Persian Caspian Sea coast he also fought Mirza Kuchik Khan and his Jangali forces in Manjil.

Dunsterville was assigned to re-inforce the defence of the key oil-field and port of Baku (in present-day Azerbaijan), held from 26 July 1918 by the anti-Soviet Centro Caspian Dictatorship. Dunsterforce personnel first arrived in Baku on 6 August 1918. However, the British and their allies had to abandon Baku on 14 September 1918 in the face of an onslaught by 14,000 Ottoman troops and Azerbaijani Generals like Ali-Agha Shikhlinski and Gaimmegam Hasan Bey, who took the city the next day. The Allies regained control of Baku within two months as a result of the Ottoman armistice of 30 October 1918.

== Post-war years ==
Promoted to substantive major general in June 1918, Dunsterville died at the age of 80 in March 1946 at Torquay, Devon, England.

== Family ==
Captain Lionel Charles Dunsterville of the Indian Staff Corps married Margaret Emily (known as "Daisie"), daughter of Captain John Walter Keyworth late 48th Regiment, in November 1897 at Bishopsteignton, Devon, England.

Their elder son, Lionel Walter Dunsterville, was born on 9 September 1902 at Tientsin, China; their younger son Galfrid Charles Keyworth was born on 18 February 1905; and their daughter Susannah Margaret on 14 July 1911. Galfrid co-authored books on Venezuelan orchids with L. A. Garay. Susannah's first husband was the Swiss lawyer and diplomat August R. Lindt, the son of a renowned chocolate manufacturer. Her second husband was Colditz escapee Damiaen Joan van Doorninck, whom she met in Switzerland during the Second World War as a Resistance worker.

== Sources ==
- Encyclopaedia of the First World War - Who's Who
