= Centrocaspian Dictatorship =

1918 anti-Soviet administration in Baku, Azerbaijan

Central-Caspian Dictatorship Centro-Caspian Dictatorship Диктатура Центрокаспия (Russian) Sentrokaspi Diktaturası (Azerbaijani)
- 1918
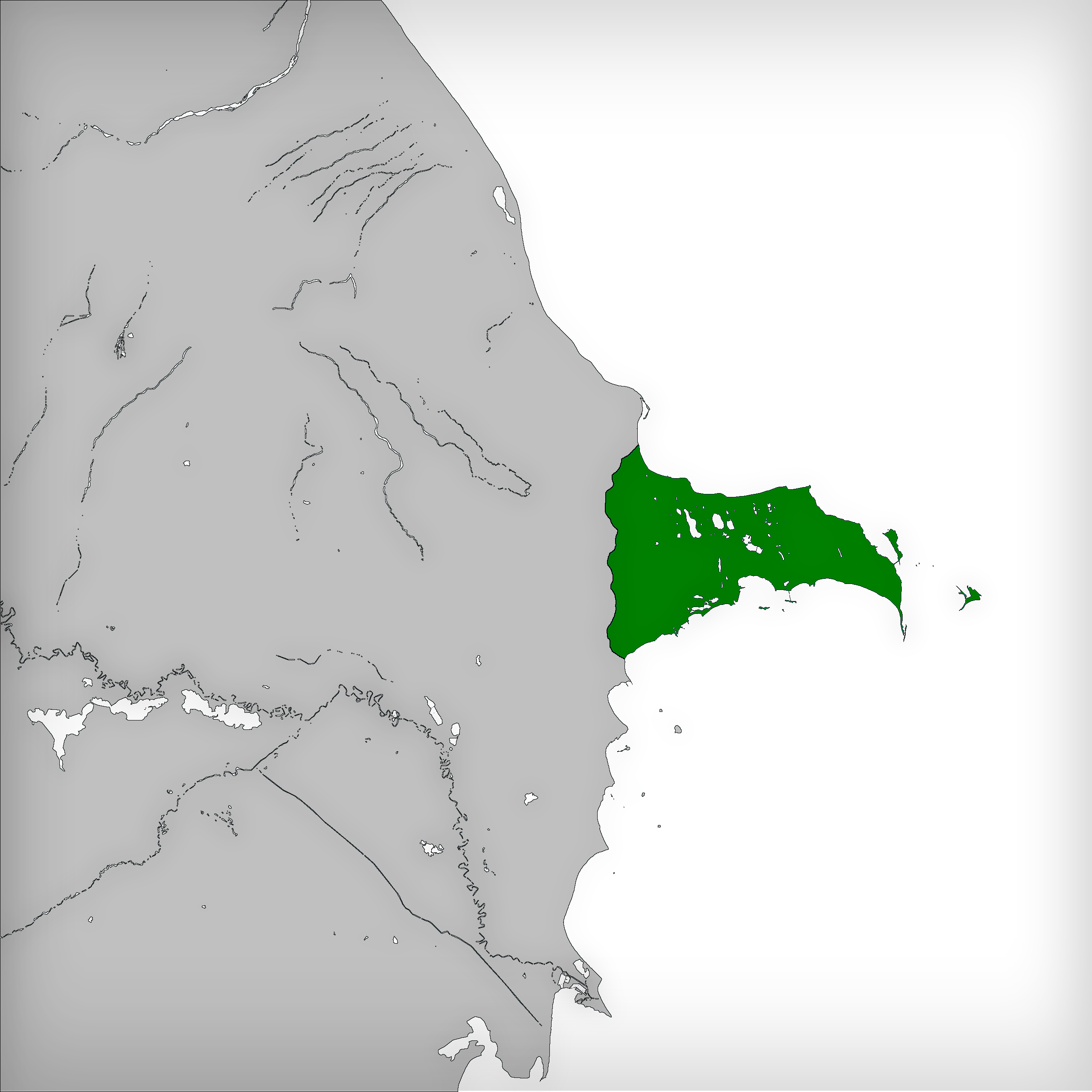
- Area controlled by the Centrocaspian Dictatorship in August 1918
- Capital: Baku
- Common languages: Russian; Azerbaijani
- Government: Military dictatorship
- Historical era: World War I
  - July 26 Baku Coup d'état: 26 July 1918
  - Battle of Baku: 26 August 1918
  - Liberation of Baku: 15 September 1918
  - Armistice of Mudros: 30 October 1918
Preceded by	Succeeded by
26 Baku Commissars	Azerbaijan Democratic Republic
- Today part of: Azerbaijan

The Centro-Caspian Dictatorship, also known as the Central-Caspian Dictatorship (Russian: Диктатура Центрокаспия, romanized: Diktatura Tsentrokaspiya, Azerbaijani: Sentrokaspi Diktaturası), was a short-lived anti-Soviet administration proclaimed in the city of Baku during World War I. Created from an alliance of the Socialist Revolutionary Party and Mensheviks, it replaced the Baku Commune in the bloodless July 26 Baku Coup d'état of 1918, and fell on 15 September 1918, when a coalition of Ottoman-Azerbaijani forces captured Baku.

The Central-Caspian Dictatorship asked for British help in order to stop the advancing Ottoman Islamic Army of the Caucasus that was marching towards Baku. A small British force under General Lionel Dunsterville was sent to Baku and helped the mainly Dashnak-Armenian forces to defend the capital during the Battle of Baku. However, the Azerbaijani-Ottoman army took Baku over on 15 September 1918, which entered the capital, subsequently causing British forces to evacuate and much of the Armenian population to flee. After the Ottoman Empire signed the Armistice of Mudros on 30 October 1918, a British occupational force re-entered Baku.

== See also ==
- Transcaspian Government
