= Digah, Absheron =

Digah
- Municipality
- Location within Azerbaijan
- Coordinates: 40°29′34″N 49°52′22″E
- Country: Azerbaijan
- Rayon: Absheron

Population
  - Total: 3,050
- Time zone: UTC+4 (AZT)
  - Summer (DST): UTC+5 (AZT)

Digah (also, Digyakh, Digakh, Diqex, and Dygya) is a village and municipality in the Absheron Rayon of Azerbaijan. It has a population of 3,050.
