= G. C. K. Dunsterville =

Galfrid Clement Keyworth "Stalky" Dunsterville (February 18, 1905 – November 26, 1988) was a business executive and a botanist who studied the orchids of Venezuela.

He was born in Devon to Lionel Dunsterville (who inspired the title character of Rudyard Kipling's Stalky & Co. and later became a major-general) and his wife, the former Margaret "Daisie" Keyworth. Galfrid took a degree in mining engineering from the University of Birmingham in 1925. He then joined Shell Oil and worked in various countries. He married Ellinor "Nora" Freeman in 1929; they had two daughters. Dunsterville had never liked his given names, and when a co-worker and Kipling fan nicknamed him "Stalky", it stuck. In 1947 the Dunstervilles were transferred to Venezuela, where Dunsterville would live for the rest of his life. He became the president of Shell in Venezuela in 1957 and retired in 1959.

In the early 1950s, he became interested in Venezuela's native orchids, initially as subjects for painting. He made contact with the orchidologist Leslie A. Garay and after retirement devoted himself to orchids full-time, traveling around Venezuela with his wife to draw and collect them. His collaboration with Garay led to the six-volume Venezuelan Orchids Illustrated (finished in 1976) and Orchids of Venezuela: An Illustrated Field Guide (1979). He also published over 250 articles on orchids, solo or co-authored with his wife, Garay, and others. His book with Ellinor, Orchid Hunting in the Lost World (And Elsewhere in Venezuela) (1988), was a collection of 64 articles that had originally appeared in the American Orchid Society Bulletin.

== Legacy ==
Garay named two genera, each with only one known species, after him: Dunstervillea and Stalkya.
