= List of formations of the Turkish Land Forces =

This is a provisional list of formations of the Turkish Army as of 2008. It needs further authoritative corroboration.

A formation is a military organization that includes a mixture of its own ('organic') and operationally attached sub-units, and is usually combat-capable.

The IISS and the Turkish Army's website gave differing figures as to the number of formations in the Army. In 2007 the official site gave totals of 9 Army Corps, 1 Infantry Division, 2 Mechanized Infantry Divisions, 1 Armored Division, 1 Training Division, 11 Infantry / Motorized Infantry Brigades, 16 Mechanized Infantry Brigades, 9 Armored Brigades, 5 Para-Commando Brigades, 1 Army Aviation Brigade, 2 Artillery Brigades, 5 Training Brigades and one Humanitarian Aid Brigade.

== First Army ==
First Army is based in Selimiye Barracks, Istanbul

Turkish Army corps locations
Key: 2nd (1) – 2nd Corps, 1st Army

=== 2nd Corps ===
2nd Corps has its headquarters at Gelibolu, Çanakkale/Edirne

- 4th Mechanised Infantry Brigade (Keşan, Edirne)
- 18th Mechanized Infantry Brigade (Ortaköy, Çanakkale)
- 54th Mechanized Infantry Brigade (Edirne)
- 55th Mechanized Infantry Brigade (Suloğlu, Edirne)
- 65th Mechanized Infantry Brigade (Lüleburgaz, Kirklareli)
- 102nd Artillery Regiment (Keşan, Edirne)

=== 3rd Corps ===
3rd Corps is based in Şişli/ Istanbul. As the NATO Rapid Deployable Corps – Turkey, if released and authorized by the Turkish government it is placed under the Supreme Allied Commander Europe.

- 52nd Tactical Armored Division (Hadımkoy)
  - 1st Armoured Bde (Hadımkoy/ Istanbul)
  - 2nd Armoured Bde (Kartal/Istanbul)
  - 66th Motorized Infantry Brigade (Hasdal/Istanbul)

=== 5th Corps ===
5th Corps is based in Çorlu/ Tekirdağ

- 3rd Armoured Brigade (Turkey) (Çerkezköy/ Tekirdağ)
- 95th Armored Bde (Malkara/Tekirdağ)
- 8th Mechanized Infantry Bde (Tekirdağ)
- 105th Artillery Regiment

Previous up until 1992-93 the 2nd Infantry Division (Turkey) was based at Adarpazari.

== Second Army ==
Second Army is based in Malatya

=== 6th Corps ===
6th Corps is based in Adana

- 5th Armored Bde (Gaziantep)
- 39th Mech.Inf.Bde (İskenderun/Hatay)
- 106th Artillery Regiment

=== 7th Corps ===
7th Corps is based in Diyarbakır

- 3rd Таctical Infantry Divisional HQ (Yüksekova/Hakkari)
  - 10th Motorized Infantry Bde (Tatvan/Bitlis)
  - 16th Mech.Inf.Bde (Bilgekışla/ Diyarbakır)
  - 70th Mechanized Infantry Bde (Kızıltepe/Mardin)
  - 6th Motorized Infantry Bde (Akçay/Şırnak)
  - 23rd Internal Security Bde (Silopi/ Sirnak)
- 107th Artillery Regiment
- 2nd SF Regt (Mardin)

=== 8th Corps ===
8th Corps is based in Elazığ

- 20th Armored Bde (Şanlıurfa)
- 172nd Armored Bde (Kahramanmaraş; appears to have moved in mid-2008 to Silopi)
- 108th Artillery Regiment

=== 1st Commando Bde ===
1st Commando Brigade is based in (Kayseri) (besides that unit also an air force Para-Bde in Kayseri).

=== 3rd Commando Bde ===
Based in (Siirt)

=== Hakkari Mountain and Commando Bde ===
Hakkari Mountain and Commando Bde is based in (Hakkari)

== Third Army ==
Third Army is based in (Erzincan)

=== 4th Corps ===
4th Corps is based in (Ankara)

- 28th Mech.Inf.Bde (Mamak/Ankara)
- 1st Motorized Infantry Bde (Sakarya)
- 58th Artillery Bde (Polatlı/Ankara)
- Training Division/Armour School (Etimesgut/Ankara)

=== 9th Corps ===
9th Corps is based in Erzurum.

- 4th Armored Bde (Palandöken/Erzurum)
- 1st Mechanized Infantry Bde (Doğubeyazıt/Ağrı)
- 12th Mechanized Infantry Bde (Ağrı)
- 14th Mechanized Infantry Bde (Кars)
- 25th Mechanized Infantry Bde (Ardahan)
- 2nd Motorized Infantry Bde (Rize)
- 9th Motorized Infantry Bde (Sarıkamış)
- 34th Internal Security Bde (Patnos/Ağrı)
- 48th Internal Security Bde (Trabzon)
- 49th Internal Security Bde (Bingöl)
- 51st Internal Security Bde (Hozat/Tunceli)
- 59th Training Artillery Bde (Erzincan)
- 109th Artillery Regt

=== 2nd Commando Bde ===
Based in Bolu

=== 4th Commando Bde ===
Based in Tunceli

== Aegean Army ==
Based in İzmir

=== 11th Special Forces Bde ===
Based in Denizli

=== 7th Special Forces Bde ===
Based in Sakarya

=== 2nd Special Force Jandarma Bde ===
Based in Bornova/İzmir

=== 19th Motorized Infantry Bde ===
Based in Edremit/Balıkesir

=== 1st Infantry Bde ===
Based in Manisa

=== 57th Artillery Bde ===
Based in İzmir

=== Zıpkınlar Commando Regiment ===
Based in Muğla

=== 3rd Amphibious Marines Brigade ===
Based in Foça

== Cyprus Turkish Peace Force/11th Corps ==
- 28th Mechanized Infantry Div (Gazimağusa)
- 39th Mechanized Infantry Division (Based in Güzelyurt)
- 14th Armored Brigade (Turkey) (Asya)
- Cyprus Special Forces Regiment
