= Aegean Army =

Turkish Army formation based in İzmir

- Active: July 1975 – present
- Country: Turkey
- Size: 130,000 active personnel
- Part of: Turkish Army
- Garrison/HQ: İzmir

Commanders
- Current commander: Lieutenant General Kemal Yeni
- Chief of Staff: Brigadier General Bahaettin Karademir

The Aegean Army (Turkish: Ege Ordusu Komutanlığı), informally known as the Fourth Army, is one of the four main formations of the Turkish Army. It covers the entire west coast of the Anatolia peninsula and has its headquarters in İzmir. It was organised in the 1970s in response to political tensions with Greece – the ongoing Aegean dispute and the Cyprus problem.

Its stated mission is to protect Turkey's territory on its western coast. This is directed against the perceived threat posed by Greece's armament of the Aegean Sea islands. Greece, on the other hand, perceives the presence of the Aegean Army as a threat to its islands, citing strong offensive capabilities ascribed to the Aegean Army as well as the exposed and isolated geographical position of the islands, the 5 most populous of which are several hundred kilometres distant from the Greek mainland, yet sit only 2–3 km from Turkey's, as reasons of concern. Greek sources particularly point to the strong amphibian forces maintained by the Aegean Army as an indicator of its offensive nature. Turkey has countered such concerns by stating that besides being of a fundamentally defensive nature it is "basically a training army".

== History ==
It was established on July 20, 1975, independently from NATO, when the situation became more tense and the possibility of war increased with the Turkish invasion of Cyprus, which was made in a period when the tension increased after the coup in Greece on April 21, 1967, against the threat posed by the armament of Greece in the Aegean islands. Its headquarters is in Narlıdere.

== Units ==
The Army has been reported to consist of the following units and organizations:

- Cyprus Turkish Peace Force
  - Headquarters
    - 28th Mechanized Infantry Division (Paşaköy Kyrenia)
    - 39th Mechanized Infantry Division (Çamlıbel, Morphou)
    - 14th Armoured Brigade (Degirmenlik, Nicosia)
    - 49th Special Force Regiment
    - 41st Commando Regiment
    - 109th Field Artillery Regiment
    - 190th Marines Battalion
    - Communications Battalion
    - Central Command Military Police Battalion
    - Logistics Support Group (Kyrenia)
- 57th Artillery Training Brigade (İzmir)
- 19th Infantry Brigade (Edremit) (see: 19th Infantry Division (Ottoman Empire))
- 11th Motorised Infantry Brigade (Denizli)
- 3rd Infantry Training Brigade (Antalya)
- 1st Infantry Training Brigade (Manisa) - on September 20, 2024, Governor of Manisa Enver Ünlü paid a paid a farewell visit to the 1st Commando Training Brigade Commander, 5th Infantry Colonel Fatih Bozkurt, and wished him success with his work.
- Marines Brigade (Foça)

== See also ==
- List of commanders of the Aegean Army
