= 230th Mechanized Infantry Regiment =

- Turkish: 230’uncu Mekanize Piyade Alay
- Active: ? - Present
- Country: Turkey de facto Northern Cyprus
- Branch: Turkish Land Forces: Aegean Army; Cyprus Turkish Peace Force
- Type: Mechanized infantry
- Size: 2 battalions
- Part of: 28th Mechanized Infantry Division
- Garrison/HQ: Tymbou, de facto Northern Cyprus 35°7′43″N 33°30′25″E
- Engagements: Turkish invasion of Cyprus

The 230th Mechanized Infantry Regiment (Turkish: 230’uncu Mekanize Piyade Alay), is a mechanized infantry regiment of the Turkish Army stationed in the occupied village of Tymbou.

== History ==
The 230th Mechanized Infantry Regiment was originally based in Çubuk, Turkey but in May 1974 was put on alert for operations in Cyprus, later culminating to the Turkish invasion of Cyprus and being a subordinate to the 28th Infantry Division.

It has been based in occupied northern Cyprus ever since and today is currently based in Tymbou.

The 230th held a military exercise in 2022 named "Early Intervention Force" as a way to counter Greek military buildup on islands which Turkey claims should be de-militarized.

== Equipment ==
Μ48-Α5Τ2

Pars 4×4

Nurol

M113 APC
