= 39th Mechanized Division =

39th Mechanized Division may refer to:

- 39th Guards Mechanized Division, Soviet Union
- 39th Mechanized Division (Soviet Union)
- 39th Mechanized Infantry Division (Turkey)

== See also ==
- 39th Division (disambiguation)
