= 14th Armored Brigade =

Brigade of the Turkish Army based in Northern Cyprus

14th Armoured Brigade
- Countries: Turkey, Northern Cyprus
- Size: 5400
- Part of: Cyprus Turkish Peace Force
- Garrison/HQ: Kythrea, Nicosia
- March: Türk Mukavemet Teşkilatı Marşı
- Equipment: M48A5T1 M48A5T2 M60A1 M60A3
- Engagements: Operation Atilla

The 14th Armored Brigade, also known as Tunç Kışlası ( Bronze Barracks), is a brigade of the Turkish Army based in Northern Cyprus at the town of Kythrea in Nicosia.

It is part of the Aegean Army Cyprus Turkish Peace Force located within the Turkish Republic of Northern Cyprus.

It appears to trace its history to the 14th Cavalry Brigade which gained great honours during the Turkish War of Independence, during the Great Offensive, before being disbanded after service with the 7th Corps in the East in the late 1950s or early 1960s.

== Unit Elements ==
- Brigade headquarters.
- I. Tank battalion (M60A1-A3)
- II. Tank battalion (M48A5T1): stationed in Asha
- III. Tank battalion (M48A5T2 & Leopard 2A4)
- I. AVLB & ARV platoon.
- I. Self-propelled gun battalion (M44 T & T-155 Fırtına)
- I. Air defense battalion (Flugabwehrkanone 20 mm Zwilling & M42 Duster )
- I. Pedestal mounted Stinger platoon (ATILGAN PMSS)
- I. Mechanized Infantry Support Battalion (M113 APC BGM-71 TOW, ACV-30 IFV )
- I. Engineer squadron
- I. Signal battalion
- I. Chemical defense & CBRN platoon
- I. Logistics support company
- I. Maintenance and repair company
- I. Medical company
