= Cyprus Turkish Peace Force Command =

Turkish garrison in Cyprus

- Kıbrıs Türk Barış Kuvvetleri Komutanlığı
- Logo of the Cyprus Turkish Peace Force Command
- Active: 1974–present
- Country: Northern Cyprus
- Allegiance: TAF
- Size: 40,000+
- Headquarters: Girne

Commanders
- Commander: Maj. Gen. Sebahattin Kılınç

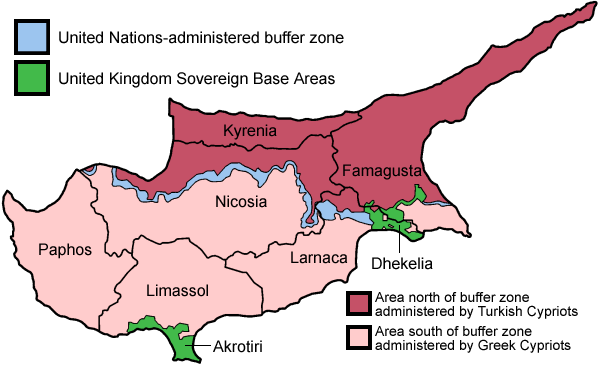
Map of Cyprus showing current political divisions

The Cyprus Turkish Peace Force Command (Turkish: Kıbrıs Türk Barış Kuvvetleri Komutanlığı) is the Turkish garrison in Cyprus. In 1974 Turkish troops invaded Cyprus following a Greek Cypriot coup d'état (organized and supported by the Greek government, which was still in the hands of a military junta) which wanted to force union with Greece, occupying the northern third of the island. The invasion force consisted of about 40,000 soldiers and 200 tanks. It outnumbers the Greek military contingent on the island, which is supplemented by the Greek Cypriot National Guard consisting of 12,000 active and 75,000 reserves. Air reinforcement of the Turkish troops can be effected, if necessary, within hours.

== History ==
Turkey maintained the Cyprus Turkish Regiment (Kıbrıs Türk Alayı) in the northern part of the Republic of Cyprus. On 16 August 1960, the brigade was organized as follows:

- Gönyeli Group (Gönyeli Grubu)
  - 2nd Infantry Company (2 nci Piyade Bölüğü)
  - 3rd Infantry Company (3 ncü Piyade Bölüğü)
  - Heavy Weapons Company (Ağır Silah Bölüğü)
- Ortaköy Group (Ortaköy Grubu)
  - 1st Infantry Company (1 nci Piyade Bölüğü)
  - 4th Infantry Company (4 ncü Piyade Bölüğü)
  - Regimental HQ Company (Alay Karargâh Servis Bölüğü)

=== Invasion of Cyprus ===
In July 1974, Turkey landed forces on the northern part of Cyprus after the military coup of July 15, 1974. Turkish forces involved in operations were as follows:

- An airborne (parachute) brigade (Commander: Brig. Gen. Sabri Evren)
- A commando brigade (Commander: Brig. Gen. Sabri Demirbağ')
- A Special Strike Force Landing Brigade (Turkish Marines) (Commander: Brig. Gen. Süleyman Tuncer)
- The 39th Infantry Division (Commander: Maj. Gen. Bedrettin Demirel)
- The 28th Infantry Division (Commander: Maj.Gen. Osman Fazıl Polat)

=== Post invasion ===
It has been on Cyprus since the Turkish invasion of 1974, and initially consisted of the following Turkish Army units:

- Cyprus Turkish Peace Force Command
  - 28th Infantry Division - headquartered at Asha (Paşaköy) to the northeast of Nicosia, and the
  - 39th Infantry Division - headquartered at Camlibel within the district of Girne.
  - A Special Force Regiment
  - An Artillery Regiment

The corps reserve was at Kythrea (Değirmenlik) to the northeast of Nicosia.

There were Turkish armoured units operating on the island since shortly after the 1974 invasion, but the 14th Armoured Brigade was not established there until 1997. In 2004, the Library of Congress Country Studies recorded the brigade as being located at Asha (Paşaköy) with M48 Patton & M60 Patton tanks.

=== Current (2015–present) ===
- 28th Mechanized Infantry Division (Paşaköy, Kyrenia)
  - 230th Mechanized Infantry Regiment (Turkey)
  - other regiments and smaller units
- 39th Mechanized Infantry Division (Çamlıbel, Morphou)
- 14th Armoured Brigade (Degirmenlik, Nicosia)
- 49th Special Force Regiment
- 41st Commando Regiment
- 109th Field Artillery Regiment
- 190th Marines Battalion
- Communications Battalion
- Central Command Military Police Battalion
- Logistics Support Group (Kyrenia)

== Strength ==
The original force of 40,000 troops was reduced with Turkish authorities claiming that the Turkish force in Cyprus had been reduced to 17,500 in the 1990s. However, according to the UN Secretary-General “It is estimated that in recent years there have been in the northern part of the island a little under 30,000 armed forces of the Republic of Turkey (Turkish Forces) making it one of the most militarized areas in the world in terms of numbers of troops and numbers of civilian population. Recently moreover there have been indications that the total numbers of Turkish forces on the island may have increased” S994/680 7.6.1994.par.28.

Turkish forces in Cyprus are part of the Turkish Aegean Army which is headquartered at İzmir in Turkey. However, the commander of the Turkish troops reports directly to the Turkish General Staff in the capital, Ankara. The force is responsible for all security and is not directly involved in political matters of northern Cyprus.

Since 16 August 1974, the Turkish Army has retained control of the northern 36.2% of Cyprus.

== Equipment in Northern Cyprus ==
=== Main battle tanks ===
Name	Image	Origin	Variant	Quantity
M48 Patton		United States	A5T2	287
M60 Patton		United States	N/A	N/A

=== Armoured fighting vehicles ===
Name	Image	Origin	Variant	Quantity
FNSS ACV-15		Malaysia / Turkey	ACV-AIFV	145

=== Armoured personnel carriers ===
Name	Image	Origin	Variant	Quantity
FNSS ACV-15		Malaysia / Turkey	ACV-AAPC	70
M113		United States	M113 A1/A2	418

=== MRAP vehicles ===
Name	Image	Origin	Note
BMC Vuran		Turkey	Used by Police forces.

=== Multi-purpose vehicles ===
Name	Image	Origin	Role
BMC Amazon	-	Turkey	Multi-purpose vehicle
Otokar Akrep	-	Turkey	Reconnaissance vehicle
Otokar Engerek		Turkey	Special operations vehicle
Land Rover Defender		TurkeyUnited Kingdom	Utility vehicle

=== Self-propelled artillery ===
Name	Image	Origin	Variant	Quantity
T-155 Fırtına		South Korea / Turkey	Fırtına I	4
M52		United States	M52T1	144
M44		United States	M44T	30

=== Multiple rocket launchers ===
Name	Image	Origin	Variant	Quantity
T-122 Sakarya		Turkey	TR-122 TRG-122 TRLG-122 TRB-122	18

=== Field artillery ===
Name	Image	Origin	Variant	Quantity
M101		United States	M101A1	36
M114		United States	M114A2	36
M115		United States		12

=== Anti-tank missiles/tank destroyers ===
Name	Image	Origin	Variant	Quantity
Tank Destroyer
FNSS ACV-15		Malaysia / Turkey	ACV-TOW	66
Anti-tank missiles
MILAN		France; West Germany / Germany	I/II	-
BGM-71 TOW		United States	I/I	-
9M133 Kornet		Russia	Kornet-E	-
Rocket propelled
M72 LAW		TurkeyUnited States	HAR 66	-
RPG-7		Soviet Union		-

=== Recoilless rifles ===
Name	Image	Origin	Variant	Quantity
M40		United States	M40A1	219

=== Mortars ===
Name	Image	Origin	Caliber	Quantity
MKEK UT/NT1	-	Turkey	81mm	171
HY-12	-	Turkey	81mm 120mm	135
M30		United States	107mm	70

=== Anti-aircraft ===
Name	Image	Origin	Variant	Quantity
Rh-202		West Germany	20mm	44
GAI-D01		Switzerland	35mm	78
GDF-003		Switzerland	35mm	16
FIM-92 Stinger		United States	A/C	-

=== Aircraft/helicopters/UAVs ===
Name	Image	Origin	Variant	Quantity
Aircraft
Cessna 185		United States	U17	3
Helicopters
AS532 Cougar		France / Europe	UL	2
UH-1 Iroquois		United States	AB-205	1
Aerial Firefighting
Kamov Ka-27		Russia	Ka-32	-
Mil Mi-17		Soviet Union / Russia	Mi-17	-
Unmanned Aerial Vehicles
Bayraktar TB2		Turkey	A/B	-

== See also ==
- TRNC Coast Guard Command
- Security Forces Command
- Hellenic Force in Cyprus
