= 28th Infantry Division (Turkey) =

Turkish army

The 28th Mechanized Infantry Division (28. Mekanize Piyade Tümeni) is an infantry formation of the Turkish Land Forces.

Tümgeneral Hayrullah Fişek’in Özgeçmişi was appointed to command the 28th Division on 1 April 1939, when it was being established. He served in the division command for about a year.

In 1941 the 28th Infantry Division was part of 4th Corps Çatalca Area, First Army. In 1949 the division included the 229th Infantry Regiment at Ankara Sarıkışla, the 230th Infantry Regiment at Çubuk, and the 240th Infantry Regiment at Ayaş.

It was deployed from Ankara under 6th Corps to Cyprus for the Turkish invasion of Cyprus in 1974.

Since the 1970s it has formed part of 11th Corps/Cyprus Turkish Peace Forces. Major General Hilmi Özkök commanded the division in 1988-90.

In 2020 the 61st Infantry Regiment at Erdemli in Cyprus was reported as part of the division.

In June 2022 the division's 230th Mechanized Infantry Regiment reportedly held an "Early Intervention Force" exercise.
