= 6th Corps (Turkey) =

- Founded: 1911
- Country: Ottoman Empire, Turkey
- Branch: Turkish Army
- Type: Infantry
- Size: Corps
- Part of: Second Army
- Garrison/HQ: Adana
- Engagements: Syrian Civil War: Operation Spring Shield; Operation Euphrates Shield; Operation Olive Branch; Northern al-Bab offensive (September 2016); 2016 Dabiq offensive; Western al-Bab offensive (October–November 2016); Battle of al-Bab

Commanders
- Commander: Maj. Gen. Levent Ergün
- Ceremonial chief: Brig. Gen. Mustafa Cüneyt Arıkan

The 6th Corps (Turkish: 6. Kolordu) is a field corps of the Turkish Army. It is headquartered at Adana in Adana Province, and is part of Second Army.

The corps traces its history to the 6. Kolordu (or Altıncı Kolordu) of the Ottoman Army. It was formed after 1911 during Ottoman military reforms. By 1911 it consisted of the 16th, 17th, and 18 Divisions and the 7th Cavalry Brigade. Its most notable service in its Ottoman guise was during the offensive phase of the 1916 Romanian Campaign of World War I, where it was heavily engaged for five months, inflicting severe casualties on the Russo-Romanians and breaking through the Allied lines in several key areas. The Corps took 8,512 prisoners in Romania, including 6,512 Russians and 2,000 Romanians.

It then was reformed after the establishment of the Grand National Assembly; fought in the Turkish War of Independence; and served during the Second World War. In 1937 it was an independent corps reporting to the General Staff, with its headquarters at Izmit, comprising the 17th and 41st Divisions. By the time the U.S. Ambassador reported on potential U.S. military assistance to Turkey in September 1947, it still had both the same divisions.

In the mid-1950s the 5th Armoured Brigade was moved from Ankara to Gaziantep.

The 1974 Turkish military operations in Cyprus consisted of two distinct offensives, the first being "Atilla 1", which commenced in the early hours of July 20, 1974, with an amphibious landing force, directed by the 6th Corps, forming a beachhead at Kyrenia's Five Mile Beach. It comprised the Naval Infantry Regiment and the 50th Regiment of the 28th Division, but was supported by rolling air and naval artillery attacks, and met with limited resistance from the Cyprus National Guard, which was in disarray as a result of the July 15, 1974 coup. The majority of fighting ceased on the 23rd of July, though sporadic clashes continued after this date until the 14th of August. "Atilla 1" successfully achieved its objective of forming a bridgehead with the Turkish Cypriot enclave of Agyrta-Nicosia.

When the corps that carried out the Cyprus Operation landed in Cyprus, its name was changed to the Cyprus Turkish Peace Forces. It was re-established immediately after the operation.

In 2004 the 6th Corps was reported to have its headquarters in Adana, with the 3rd Inf Rec Brigade at Antalya (possibly a training brigade) and the 39th Mechanized Infantry Brigade (İskenderun).

Later reports say it consists of:

- 5th Armored Brigade (Gaziantep)
- 39th Mechanized Infantry Brigade (İskenderun)
- 106th Artillery Regiment (Islahiye)

The corps was temporarily reduced in status to a division, the 6th Mechanised Infantry Division, in late 2011 after the arrest of Lieutenant General Mehmet Eröz as part of the "Internet memorandum" case, but by June 2012 Turkish press reports were reporting that it would be upgraded in status to corps level once more.

In 2015, Osman Erbaş was appointed commander of the 6th Mechanized Infantry Division (the former 6th Corps. He was in this role during the 15 July 2016 Turkish coup d'état attempt and gave orders to his subordinates to resist the attempt. He afterwards attended ceremonies for those men of the security services who were killed in the coup attempt, stating that their killers "are not soldiers", but "murderers". Erbaş was a witness in the March 2017 trial of 35 former soldiers of the 106th Artillery Regiment who were accused of participating in the coup.

In fact, it was only 2021, it was raised to the corps level again and Lieutenant General Metin Tokel was appointed as the commander.
