= 4th Corps (Turkey) =

Corps of the Turkish Land Forces

- Founded: 1923; 1966
- Country: Turkey
- Branch: Turkish Army
- Type: Infantry
- Size: Corps
- Part of: Directly responsible to Commander of the Turkish Army (2023)
- Garrison/HQ: Ankara
- Engagements: Turkish invasion of Cyprus (1974)

Commanders
- Major general: Emre Tayanç

The 4th Corps is a field corps of the Turkish Land Forces. Its headquarters is in Ankara, and it is directly responsible to the Commander of the Land Forces (as of 2023).

Tümgeneral Hayrullah Fişek’in Özgeçmişi was appointed to command the 28th Division on 1 April 1939, when it was being established. He served in the division command for about a year.

In 1941 4th Corps was part of the Çatalca Area of First Army, with headquarters in Çatalca, and consisting of the 8th, 22nd, 28th, and 64th Divisions.

In 1947 initial U.S. reports on assistance to Turkey said the corps comprised the 8th Division, 22nd Division, and 64th Division, within First Army. It was probably disestablished soon afterwards in the large-scale force reductions of 1947-50.

It was established in the Ankara area in 1966. Korgeneral tr:Eşref Akıncı appears to have become its first commander (on reformation). In 1974, it appears to have been part of the Second Army. Nigel Thomas's NATO Armies 1949-87, published in 1987, attributed the 4th, 8th, and 9th Corps to the Third Army.

In accordance with NATO's new strategy in the early 1990s, Turkey agreed to commit forces to NATO's ACE Rapid Reaction Corps. "Turkish Land Forces went through a very significant reorganisation program between 1991 and 1993. Within the framework of this reorganisation, most divisions were deactivated with the exception of a few. [However], the decision was made to create a new division. Thus, the old 1st Infantry Division which had been abolished many years ago was reactivated and renamed as 1 TU Mech Inf Div (1. Mekanize Piyade Tümen Komutanlığı) and attached to 4 TU Corps on 30 November 1993." Major Generals tr:Oktar Ataman, promoted 1992, and tr:Orhan Yöney commanded the division. Major General tr:Ergin Sagun was also Deputy Commander of 4th Corps and Commander 1st Mechanized Infantry Division as a major-general, before he was promoted in 2001. BY 2001 the division was at Mamak in Ankara.

The division's 9th Brigade was then disestablished circa 2004.
