= Turkish Land Forces =

Turkish land armed forces

- Türk Kara Kuvvetleri
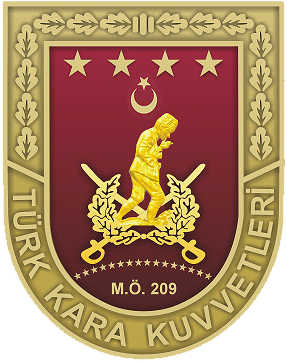
- Emblem of the Turkish Land Forces
- Founded: 8 November 1920 (106 years ago); as the Army of the Grand National Assembly 1 July 1949 (77 years ago); as the Turkish Land Forces Command
- Country: Turkey
- Type: Army
- Role: Land warfare
- Size: 401,500 (official TAF figure); 380,000 (CIA, active duty only)
- Part of: Turkish Armed Forces
- Mottos: Etkin, Caydırıcı, Saygın 'Effective, Deterrent, Respectable'
- Colors: Gold & maroon
- March: Harbiye Marşı
- Anniversaries: 28 June (Note: This is the official anniversary date. Until 1982, the official date of the army's founding was 28 June 1363—the date of the founding of the Ottoman Janissary Corps. In 1982, the year was changed to 209 BC, considering it to be the founding year of the Hun Empire, but the army's founding day, 28 June, remained unchanged.)
- Equipment: List of equipment of the Turkish Land Forces
- Engagements: List of wars involving Turkey: War of Independence; Sheikh Said rebellion; Ararat rebellion; Dersim massacre; Korean War; Turkish invasion of Cyprus; Turkey–PKK conflict; Operation Allied Force; Operation Alba; War in Afghanistan; Operation Sun; Iraq cross-border raids; Syrian border clashes; Mali War; Turkey–Islamic State conflict; Operation Shah Euphrates; Operation Euphrates Shield; Operation Olive Branch; Operation Peace Spring; Turkish military intervention in Libya; Operation Spring Shield
- Website: www.kkk.tsk.tr/en/

Commanders
- Commander-in-chief: President Recep Tayyip Erdoğan
- Minister of National Defence: Minister Yaşar Güler
- Chief of the General Staff: General Selçuk Bayraktaroğlu
- Commander: General Metin Tokel
- Chief of Staff: Lt. Gen. Veli Tarakcı

Insignia
- Army aviation roundel

The Turkish Land Forces (Turkish: Türk Kara Kuvvetleri) is the main branch of the Turkish Armed Forces responsible for land-based military operations. The army was formed on 8 November 1920, after the collapse of the Ottoman Empire. Significant campaigns since the foundation of the army include suppression of rebellions in Southeast Anatolia and East Anatolia from the 1920s to the present day, combat in the Korean War, the 1974 Turkish invasion of Cyprus, the Turkish involvement in the Syrian civil war, as well as its NATO alliance against the USSR during the Cold War. The army holds the preeminent place within the armed forces. It is customary for the Chief of the General Staff of the Turkish Armed Forces to have been the Commander of the Turkish Land Forces prior to his appointment as Turkey's senior ranking officer.

Alongside the other two armed services, the Turkish Army has frequently intervened in Turkish politics, a custom that is now regulated to an extent by the reform of the National Security Council. It assumed power for several periods in the latter half of the 20th century. It carried out coups d'état in 1960, 1971, and 1980. Most recently, it maneuvered the removal of an Islamic-oriented prime minister, Necmettin Erbakan, in 1997.

From late 2015, the Turkish Army (along with the rest of the Armed Forces) saw its personnel strengths increased to a similar level as the previous decade. Factors that contributed to this growth include the Turkish occupation of northern Syria, as well as a renewal of the Kurdish–Turkish conflict.

== History ==
The Turkish Army traces its origin to the Ottoman Army. A theory accepted officially was that the Ottoman Armed Forces had been founded in 1363, when the Pençik corps (the predecessor of the Janissary Corps, the first full time professional military force established in Europe after the Roman legions) had been formed and, in this context, on 28 June 1963, it celebrated the 600th anniversary of its foundation. In the same year, one of the prominent Pan-Turkists, Nihal Atsız, asserted that the Turkish Army had been founded in 209 BC, when Modu Chanyu of the Xiongnu is thought to have formed an army based on the decimal system. In 1968, Yılmaz Öztuna proposed this theory to Cemal Tural, who was the Chief of the General Staff of the Republic of Turkey at the time. In 1973, when the Turkish Army celebrated the 610th anniversary of its foundation, Nihal Atsız published his claim again. After the 1980 Turkish coup d'état, the Turkish Army formally adopted the date 209 BC as its year of foundation.

The foundations of the modern Turkish Army were laid during the reign of Sultan Mahmud II. After the Janissary Corps, which was outdated and could not adapt to the times, was abolished with the Auspicious Incident (15 June 1826), Sultan Mahmud II ordered the establishment of Asakir-i Mansure-i Muhammediye (Victorious Soldiers of the Prophet Muhammad). By embarking on a rapid modernization effort that took the military and technical developments in Europe as an example, the new army decree was approved by Sultan Mahmud II on 7 July 1826, and the Asâkir-i Mansûre-i Muhammediyye Army, the modern army of the empire, was established. After this date, Sultan Mahmud II accelerated his reform efforts and started to establish schools and institutions to support the new army. The Seraskerlik institution, a high military command, was established by Mahmud II in 1826 to fulfill the duties of the commander-in-chief, and on 14 March 1827, Imperial Military School of Medicine, which is the basis of Turkey's first medical faculty and modern military hospital Gülhane Training and Research Hospital, was established to meet the army's need for physicians and surgeons. Harbiye Military School was later established in 1834 as a modern officer school modeled on the French and Prussian armies, taught by European instructors.

The name of the army was changed to Asâkir-i Nizâmiye-i Şâhâne (Royal Regular Soldiers) by Sultan Abdülmecid on 14 June 1843. From this date onwards, the army began to be known simply as the Nizami Ordu (Regular Army). Kuleli Military High School was opened in 1845. In 1848, Erkan-ı Harbiye Military Academy was opened to train Staff Officers. In 1880, Erkân-ı Harbiye-i Umûmiye Riyaseti, which is equivalent to today's General Staff, was established. In 1908, the name of the Seraskerlik institution was changed to the Ministry of War and the reform efforts reached their peak.

=== War of Independence ===
The Turkish War of Independence (19 May 1919 – 24 July 1923) was a series of military campaigns waged by the Turkish National Movement after parts of the Ottoman Empire were occupied and partitioned following its defeat in World War I. These campaigns were directed against Greece in the west, Armenia in the east, France in the south, loyalists and separatists in various cities, and British and Ottoman troops around Constantinople (İstanbul).

The ethnic demographics of the modern Turkish Republic were significantly impacted by the earlier Armenian genocide and the deportations of Greek-speaking, Orthodox Christian Rum people. The Turkish National Movement carried out massacres and deportations to eliminate native Christian populations—a continuation of the Armenian genocide and other ethnic cleansing operations during World War I. Following these campaigns of ethnic cleansing the historic Christian presence in Anatolia was destroyed, in large part, and the Muslim demographic had increased from 80% to 98%.

While World War I ended for the Ottoman Empire with the Armistice of Mudros, the Allied Powers occupied parts of the empire and sought to prosecute former members of the Committee of Union and Progress and others involved in the Armenian genocide. According to the terms of the agreement, it was decided to limit the number of soldiers in the Turkish army to 50,000. Ottoman military commanders therefore refused orders from both the Allies and the Ottoman government to surrender and disband their forces. This crisis reached a head when Sultan Mehmed VI dispatched Mustafa Kemal Atatürk, a well-respected and high-ranking general, to Anatolia to restore order.

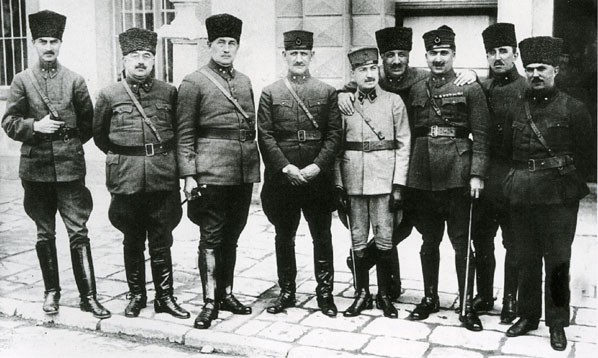
Commanders of the Turkish Army during the Turkish War of Independence

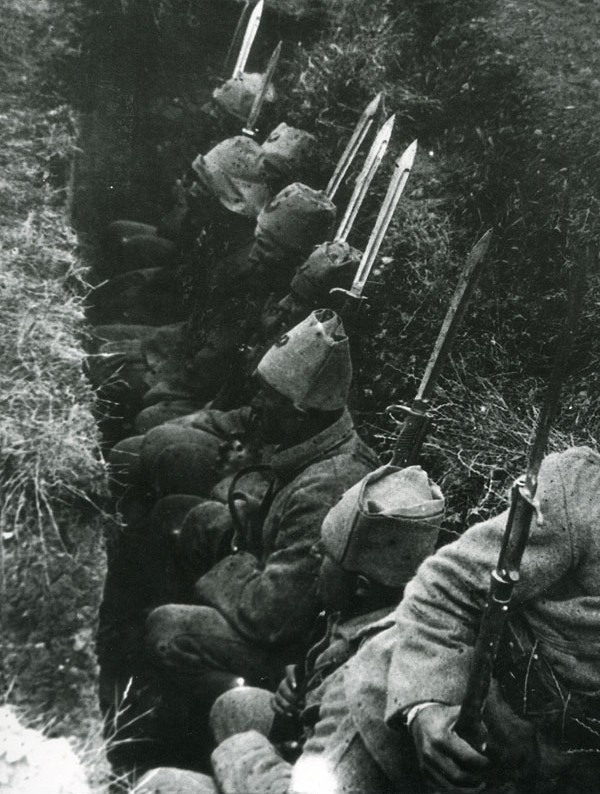
Turkish soldiers in a trench waiting for the order to attack with fixed bayonets on their rifles

With Anatolia in practical anarchy and the Ottoman army being questionably loyal in reaction to Allied land seizures, Mehmed VI established the military inspectorate system to reestablish authority over the remaining empire. Encouraged by Karabekir and Edmund Allenby, he assigned Mustafa Kemal Pasha (Atatürk) as the inspector of the Ninth Army Troops Inspectorate –based in Erzurum– to restore order to Ottoman military units and to improve internal security on 30 April 1919. Mustafa Kemal was a well known, well respected, and well connected army commander, with much prestige coming from his status as the "Hero of Anafartalar"—for his role in the Gallipoli Campaign—and his title of "Honorary Aide-de-camp to His Majesty Sultan" gained in the last months of WWI. He was a nationalist and a fierce critic of the government's accommodating policy to the Entente powers. His new assignment gave him effective plenipotentiary powers over all of Anatolia which was meant to accommodate him and other nationalists to keep them loyal to the government. Mustafa Kemal became an enabler and eventually leader of Turkish National Movement against the Ottoman government, Allied powers, and Christian minorities. On 3 May 1920, Birinci Ferik Mustafa Fevzi Pasha (Çakmak) was appointed the Minister of National Defence, and Mirliva İsmet Pasha (İnönü) was appointed the Minister of the Chief of General Staff of the government of the Grand National Assembly (GNA). The modern Turkish Army has its foundations in nine remnant Ottoman Army corps.

In an attempt to establish control over the power vacuum in Anatolia, the Allies persuaded Greek Prime Minister Eleftherios Venizelos to launch an expeditionary force into Anatolia and occupy Smyrna (İzmir), beginning the Turkish War of Independence. A nationalist Government of the Grand National Assembly (GNA), led by Mustafa Kemal, was established in Ankara when it became clear the Ottoman government was backing the Allied powers. The Allies soon pressured the Ottoman government in Constantinople into suspending the Constitution, shuttering the Chamber of Deputies, and signing the Treaty of Sèvres, a treaty that the "Ankara government" declared illegal.

In the ensuing war, Kuva-yi Milliye irregular militia defeated the French forces in the south, and undemobilized units went on to partition Armenia with Bolshevik forces, resulting in the Treaty of Kars (October 1921). The Western Front of the independence war was known as the Greco-Turkish War, in which Greek forces at first encountered unorganized resistance. The Turkish military units that were hastily formed in 1920 consisted of 20 infantry divisions in eight corps. The number of soldiers in the units was small. The divisions consisted of three infantry regiments and one artillery regiment. However İsmet Pasha's organization of militia into a regular army paid off when Ankara forces fought the Greeks in the First and Second Battle of İnönü. The Greek army emerged victorious in the Battle of Kütahya-Eskişehir and decided to attack Ankara, stretching their supply lines. On 3 August 1921, the GNA fired İsmet Pasha from the post of Minister of National Defence because of his failure at the Battle of Afyonkarahisar–Eskişehir and on 5 August, just before the Battle of Sakarya, appointed the chairman of the GNA Atatürk as commander-in-chief of the Army of the GNA. The Turks checked the Greek advance in the Battle of Sakarya and counter-attacked in the Great Offensive, which expelled Greek forces from Anatolia in the span of three weeks. On 1 August 1922, the Western Front Command had a force of 200,000 men, consisting of 23 infantry and 5 cavalry divisions, ready for the offensive. On August 26, 1922, the Army of the Grand National Assembly (Büyük Millet Meclisi Ordusu) launched the general offensive known as the Great Offensive (Büyük Taarruz) against the Greek forces around Kara Hisâr-ı Sâhip. Nurettin Pasha's 1st Army and Yakup Şevki Pasha's 2nd Army encircled the main body of Major General Nikolaos Trikoupis's group and defeated it near Dumlupınar. Fahrettin Pasha's V Cavalry Corps entered Smyrna (İzmir) on September 9, 1922. Şükrü Naili Pasha's III Corps entered Constantinople (Istanbul) peacefully on October 6, 1923. Subsequent to the founding of the Republic of Turkey, the Army of the GNA was reorganized. According to the "Hazar Project" dated August 5, 1923, the Turkish Land Forces were organized as three army inspectorates, nine corps, 18 infantry divisions, and three cavalry divisions, and this structure continued until the 1970s. Later, after the tensions with Greece, it was decided to establish a fourth army.

The war effectively ended with the Turkish capture of Smyrna and the Chanak Crisis, prompting the signing of the Armistice of Mudanya.

The Grand National Assembly in Ankara was recognized as the legitimate Turkish government, which signed the Treaty of Lausanne in July 1923. The Allies evacuated Anatolia and Eastern Thrace, the Ottoman government was overthrown and the monarchy abolished, and the Grand National Assembly of Turkey (which remains Turkey's primary legislative body today) declared the Republic of Turkey on 29 October 1923. With the war, a population exchange between Greece and Turkey, the partitioning of the Ottoman Empire, and the abolition of the sultanate, the Ottoman era came to an end, and with Atatürk's reforms, the Turks created the modern, secular nation-state of Turkey. On 3 March 1924, the Ottoman caliphate was also abolished.

=== Army formations after 1923 ===
Following the abolition of the Western Front Command on 1 September 1923, the army was organised into Army Inspectorates (Ordu Müfettişlikleri), corps, divisions, and independent units:

1st Army Inspectorate

- 2nd Corps (HQ: Balıkesir)
  - 1st Division of the 2nd Corps – Bursa
  - 4th Division (4. Tümen) – Edremit
- 3rd Corps (HQ: İstanbul)
  - 1st Division (1. Tümen) – İstanbul
  - 6th Division (6. Tümen) – Çorlu
- 4th Corps (HQ: Eskişehir)
  - 8th Division - Ankara
  - 23rd Division - Izmit

2nd Army Inspectorate (HQ: Konya)

- 1st Corps (HQ: Afyonkarahisar)
  - 16th Division (16. Tümen) – Manisa
  - 57th Division (57. Tümen) – İzmir
  - 1st Mountain Brigade (1. Dağ Tugayı) – Muğla
- 5th Corps (HQ: Konya)
  - 5th Division – Konya
  - 6th Cavalry Division (6. Süvari Tümeni) – Isparta
- 6th Corps (Turkey) (HQ: Kayseri)
  - 7th Division in Adana
  - 41st Division in Niğde
  - 39th Mountain Brigade in İslahiye.

3rd Army Inspectorate (HQ: Erzurum)

- 7th Corps (HQ: Diyarbakır)
  - 2nd Division – Siirt
  - 17th Division (17. Tümen) – Elazığ
- 8th Corps (HQ: Tokat)
  - 12th Division (12. Tümen) – Sivas
  - 15th Division (15. Tümen) – Samsun
- 9th Corps (HQ: Erzurum)
  - 3rd Division (3. Tümen) – Erzincan
  - 9th Division – Sarıkamış

Independent units

- 1st Independent Cavalry Division (1. Bağımsız Süvari Tümeni) – Ağrı (Pain)
- 14th Cavalry Division (14. Süvari Tümeni) – Şanlıurfa

The Istanbul Command (İstanbul Komutanlığı) was established in 1934, and supervised several divisions.

=== First Kurdish rebellions and Second World War ===
There were several Kurdish rebellions in the South-East of Turkey in the 1920s and 1930s, the most important of which were the 1925 Sheikh Said rebellion and the 1937 Dersim rebellion. All were suppressed by the TAF, sometimes involving large-scale mobilisations of up to 50,000 troops. Associated atrocities against civilians include the Zilan massacre.

In 1935, Turkey purchased 60 T-26 modified 1933 light tanks from the USSR (also, two twin-turreted T-26 mod. 1931 were presented to the Turkish government in 1933–1934), along with about 60 BA-6 armoured cars to form the 1st Tank Battalion of the 2nd Cavalry Division at Lüleburgaz. The Armoured Brigade of the Turkish Army consisted of the 102nd and the 103rd Companies armed with the T-26 mod. 1933 tanks (four platoons in a company, five tanks in the platoon) at the end of 1937. The reserve group of the brigade had 21 T-26 tanks also. At the beginning of 1940, the Turkish Army had the Armoured Brigade in Istanbul, which belonged to the 1st Army, and the 1st Tank Battalion, which belonged to the 3rd Army. Turkish T-26 tanks were taken out of service in 1942.

The Annual Report of the British Embassy in Ankara for 1937 said that the Army's manpower included 22 divisions but "progress in mechanization was slow." The shortage of tanks and other armoured vehicles was marked: "units are known to have been transported from Thrace to Anatolia for manoeuvres and reviews." The total strength of the forces was given as 120,000. Exercises were held in the İzmir area to practice defence against a landing from a hostile country "tacitly recognized as Italy." Separately, when war broke out, another report said that the motorised transport of the army consisted of 28 different types of old lorries.

By March 1937, it was the declared Turkish intention to increase the number [of their infantry divisions] to thirty. By 1939, it had been decided that 40–42 divisions were required. In the spring of 1939, faced with the prospect of war, the Turks began a slow and unobtrusive mobilization and expansion. On 1 May, the British embassy reported that while no announcement had been made to this effect, the classes of 1934, 1935, and 1936 had been recalled to the colours. The class of 1938 had been retained, and that of 1939 called up six weeks early. In addition, all reserve officers were being recalled, and the selective recall of specialists was begun. All units were brought to war strength. New divisions were formed in Thrace. There was limited reinforcement of the forces in eastern Anatolia."

During Ismet Inonu's presidency, and in anticipation of the outbreak of World War II, the General Staff established the Çakmak Line, as previously proposed by Chief of Staff General Fevzi Çakmak, in the north of Kırklareli. The line was to resist any attack that might come from the Balkans on the Thrace border. In February 1941, the Germans invaded Bulgaria and reached the Turkish border. Thereupon, it was decided to draw the line to Çatalca. It was considered doubtful that this plan would be successful in the face of modern tactics used by the Germans.

The Çatalca Line was built in two lines starting from Durusu (Lake Terkos) to Büyükçekmece. On these lines, there are military bunkers, some of which are large and some of which are small. This position is connected to each other with wall wire and iron barriers. The construction of the Çakmak Line could not progress due to lack of cement and iron. Only 380,000 tons of cement could be produced annually, and these factories were found in places where they could be easily destroyed by enemy forces.

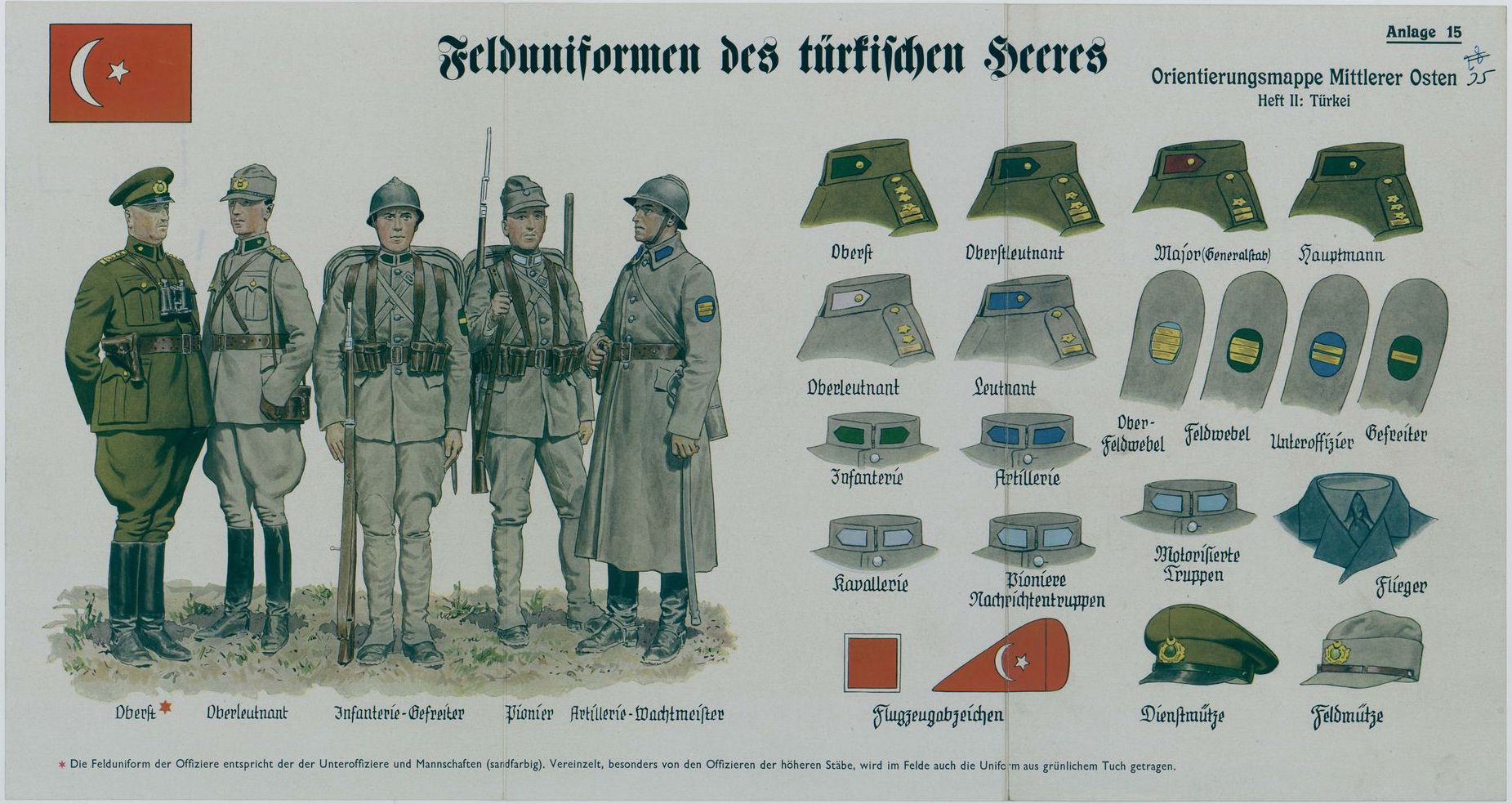
German picture depicting the uniforms of the Turkish Army in World War II

After Nazi Germany invaded Greece, the Çakmak Line lost its defensive function, as it was arranged against attacks from Bulgaria, whereas Germany could now invade Turkey via Western Thrace, through the lower part of the Meriç River. In response, İsmet İnönü ordered the Çakmak Line to be evacuated and withdrew the army to the Çatalca Line, since the Çakmak Line, which stretched along the northern border of Thrace, would no longer serve as a viable defensive position.

In 1938, the Turkish Army at peacetime strength consisted of 174,000 soldiers and 20,000 officers forming 11 army corps, 23 divisions, one armoured brigade, three cavalry brigades, and seven frontier commands. Like many states, it was ill-equipped with primarily World War I era weapons. The rifles used were a mixture, including Mausers, Mannlichers, Lee–Enfields, Martinis, Lebels, and others. As late as February 1940, the British Foreign Office noted: "The Turkish Army is very short of rifles and has asked us to supply 150,000."

During the Anglo-Turkish Treaty negotiations in September 1939, a military credit agreement amounting to £25 million was agreed upon. A Turkish Ministry of Defence letter to the Turkish General Staff dated 22 March 1940, stated that the Turkish Army was to be increased to 1.3 million effectives, forming 14 army corps consisting of 41 infantry and three cavalry divisions, seven fortified positions and one armoured brigade. Yet, the letter stated, "the material resources of the nation were unable to provide for the provisioning and transport of this large number of effectives".

During World War II, Turkey mobilized more than a million personnel. The Turkish Army order of battle in 1941 shows a number of formations. Despite the large-scale mobilization, Turkey had been severely stretched by its actions in World War I and the leadership wished to avoid another risky and costly war. Turkey's strongest economic ties were with Germany, and many Turkish leaders, including Chief of Staff General Çakmak, had significant sympathy for the German position. The Army was also poorly equipped and somewhat rigidly out-of-date. Churchill met with Inonu at the Adana Conference in January 1943, and in April 1943, General Hastings Ismay arrived in Turkey to oversee the delivery of military equipment (Operation Hardihood), and to do everything possible to get Turkey into the war on the Allied side as fast as possible. Britain had delivered 200 Valentine tanks from 1941. Turkish leaders from Inonu downward saw only risks. Neutral for most of the war, Turkey declared war on Nazi Germany in February 1945, after being given an ultimatum by the Allies of World War II to do so by 1 March 1945, if Turkey wanted a seat in the future United Nations.

=== Cold War era ===
In August 1947, the American Military Mission for Aid to Turkey (later prefixed Joint, thus becoming JAMMAT) was established in Ankara. Hastened by the Soviet threat during the Turkish Straits crisis, large amounts of United States military aid began arriving. JAMMAT began giving significant amounts of advice on the reorganisation and modernisation of the Turkish Army.

In December 1948, the Turkish Army was described as three armies, 13 army corps, 35 infantry divisions; three cavalry divisions, six armoured brigades, and four fortress commands at 33% of war strength; and 309,300 strong. There were also additional security troops.

In the later stages of the war, the 2nd Armoured Brigade at Gallipoli had been retitled a "division", though, in truth, no changes had been made to its structure. An armoured formation in the Gallipoli region was deemed inappropriate. Thus, the 2nd Division was retitled back into a brigade, and then in May 1948 transferred to the Muharrem Kÿrÿ-Etimesgut (Ankara) region.

In May 1948, the Army's armoured units included:

- 1st Armored Brigade, Kartal/Maltepe
- 2nd Armoured Brigade, Etimesgut, Ankara
- 3rd Armored Brigade, Davutpaÿa/Istanbul
- 4th Armoured Brigade, Aÿkale/Erzurum
- 5th Armoured Brigade, Mamak, Ankara (by mid-1950s moving to Gaziantep)
- 6th Armored Brigade, Kandilli, Istanbul

At this time the brigades each had about 36 M24 Chaffees, plus M36s.

The headquarters of the Turkish Army was separated from the General Staff on 1 July 1949, and Nuri Yamut was appointed as the first commander of the Turkish Army. After Turkey joined NATO, U.S. M24 Chaffee light tanks (238) and M47 Patton medium tanks began arriving.

==== Korean War ====
The Turkish Army participated in the Korean War as a member state of the United Nations. Of the 5,000 soldiers of the Turkish Brigade there, 731 were killed. They fought in the Battle of Wawon where it was credited with saving the U.S. 2nd Infantry Division from encirclement. The brigade also fought at Gimnyangjang-ni, 'Operation Ripper,' or the Fourth Battle of Seoul, and the Battle of the Hook. Brigadier General Tahsin Yazici took a voluntary reduction of one rank in order to command the first Turkish contingent. After 1953 and the Korean Armistice, the Turkish force was retained in Korea at full strength for another seven years, before being reduced to company strength in 1966. Even after that, a small honour guard unit remained in Korea until 1971.

"By 1960, with the military already deeply involved in political affairs because of the government's use of martial law to enforce its policies, the senior command concluded that the government had departed from Kemalist principles and that the republic was in imminent danger of disintegration. On May 27, 1960, Turkish army units, under the direction of the Chief of General Staff, Cemal Gürsel, seized the principal government buildings and communications centers and arrested President Bayar, Prime Minister Menderes, and most of the DP representatives in the Grand National Assembly, as well as a large number of other public officials. Those arrested were charged with abrogating the constitution and instituting a dictatorship. The coup was accomplished with little violence and was accepted quickly throughout the country."

In 1971, the Army with the other branches of the Armed Forces imposed the military memorandum to change the civilian government's policies.

The Turkish Land Forces became deeply involved in Counter-Guerrilla covert preparation for resistance. Counter-Gurrilla was the Turkish component of the US/NATO "Operation Gladio" covert preparations against any Soviet/Warsaw Pact occupation of Western Europe. During the 1970s, the Special Warfare Department was run by General Kemal Yamak. In his memoirs he stated that the United States had set aside around $1m worth of support; part munitions, part money. This arrangement continued until 1973–1974, when Yamak decided the munitions did not meet the department's needs. According to Yamak, in a face-to-face meeting, the Americans said that the U.S. were footing the bill, and therefore could choose the munitions. Yamak left the meeting and expressed his concerns to the Chief of General Staff, Semih Sancar, and the agreement was subsequently annulled.

==== Turkish invasion of Cyprus ====
In July 1974, Turkey landed substantial forces suddenly in Cyprus. The invasion followed a coup organized by EOKA-B and led by Nikos Sampson who ousted the democratically elected Cypriot President Archbishop Makarios III in order to establish Enosis (Union) between Cyprus and Greece. The coup was backed by the Greek military junta in Athens.

The 1974 Turkish military operations in Cyprus can be divided into two distinct Turkish offensives, the first being "Atilla 1", which commenced in the early hours of 20 July 1974, with an amphibious landing force, directed by the 6th Corps, forming a beachhead at Kyrenia's Five Mile Beach. It comprised only infantry troops, but was supported by rolling air and naval artillery attacks, and met with limited resistance from the Cyprus National Guard, which was in disarray as a result of the 15 July 1974 coup. The majority of fighting ceased on 23 July, though sporadic clashes continued after this date until 14 August. "Atilla 1" successfully achieved its objective of forming a bridgehead with the Turkish Cypriot enclave of Agyrta-Nicosia.

The second Turkish offensive began on August 14, 1974, as Greek and Turkish Cypriot representatives met in Geneva to discuss the situation on the island. Though a United Nations ceasefire was in place (several had already been disregarded), the Turkish Army, massively reinforced from weeks of build-up, launched an all-out surprise attack on ill-prepared Greek Cypriot and Greek units. With little answer to the masses of armour, mechanised units, artillery, and air support that the Turks could bring to bear, virtually all Greek Cypriot defences collapsed in a matter of days, and by August 16, 1974, Turkish forces, spearheaded by the 28th and 39th Infantry Divisions, had extended to capture some 37% of the island, including the towns of Famagusta, Varosha and Morphou.

The conflict in Cyprus resulted in the de facto division of the island between the Turkish Cypriot controlled north and the Greek Cypriot controlled south. Turkey still maintains troops in Cyprus, since a political solution could not yet be achieved and since many members of the Turkish Cypriot community fear a return to the intercommunal violence which occurred between 1963 and 1974.

==== Historical units and structure ====
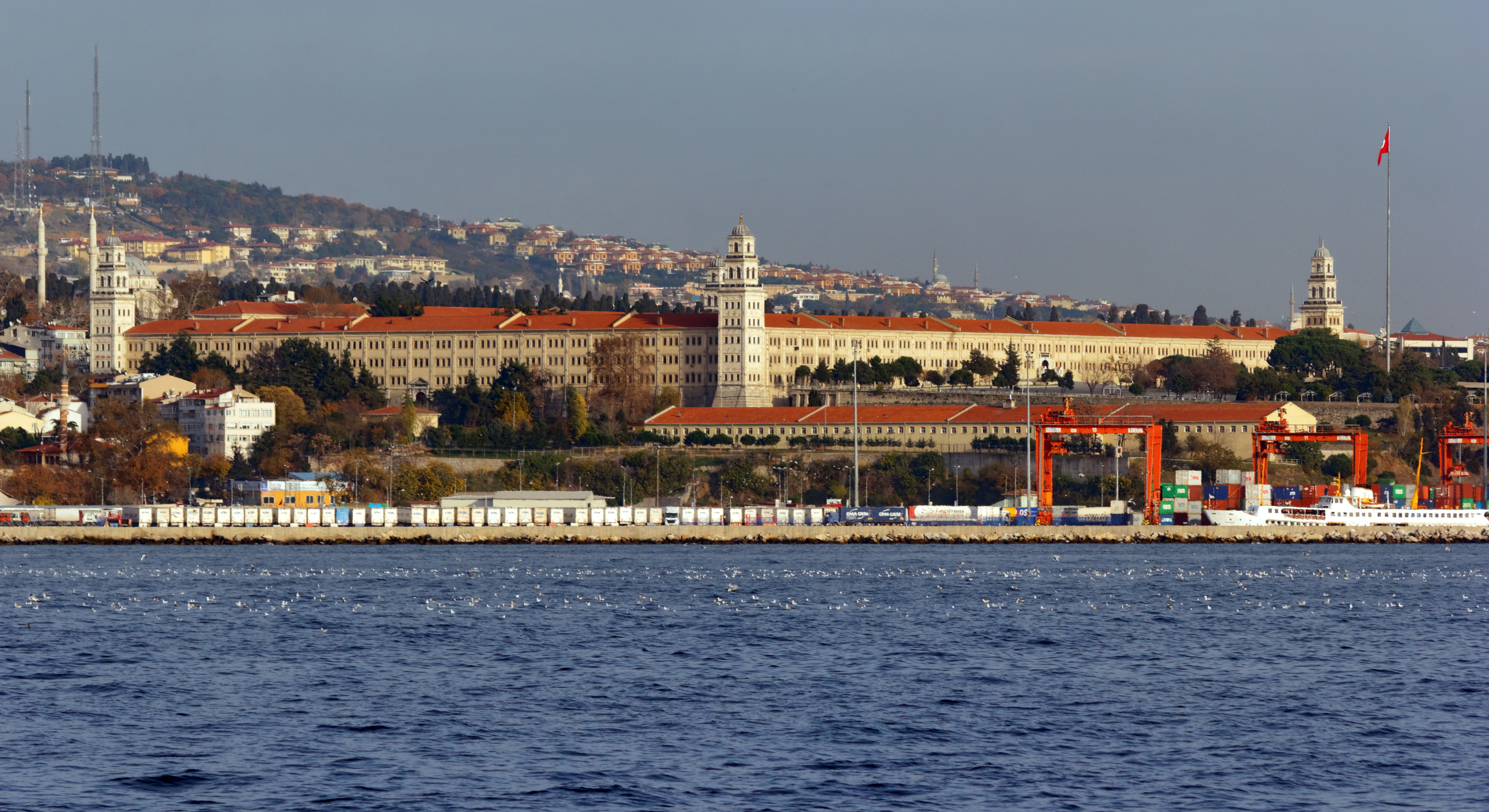
Selimiye Barracks (1828) in Istanbul is the headquarters of the First Army of the Turkish Land Forces.

The modern Turkish Army has its foundations in nine remnant Ottoman Army corps (Note: These were the I, III, XII, XIII, XIV, XV, XVII, XX, and XXV corps.) after the Armistice of Mudros at the end of World War I. After the rise of Turkish resistances, Kâzım Pasha's XV Corps was the only corps which at that time had any combat value.

The Turkish Army has since the mid-1960s operated on a corps-division-brigade system, with a varying number of divisions and brigades assigned to a corps. The IISS Military Balance 1966–67 recorded a total strength of 360,000, with 16 infantry divisions (14 NATO assigned, including the 2nd, 4th, 9th, and 10th), four armoured brigades (Zırhlı tugay) with M47 Patton tanks, armoured cavalry regiments, and two parachute battalions. It appears that infantry training divisions included the 57th in Manisa, which Kemalettin Eken commanded from 1965 to 1967. At some point in the 1960s, the Army apparently utilised the pentomic structure for a period, before adopting the American ROAD divisional organisation.

Sometime in 1966, the headquarters of the 4th Corps was reformed. In August 1966, the headquarters of the 3rd Corps was relocated to the former Military Academy building in Istanbul. In 1968, the headquarters of the 10th Infantry Division was moved from Elazig to Tatvan. At the time, the headquarters of the 8th Corps was located in Malatya. The vacated divisional headquarters in the Akpınar neighbourhood of Elazig, then became the location of the 8th Corps headquarters on approximately 18 July 1969.

The U.S. Area Handbook for the Republic of Turkey, written by Thomas Roberts, said in late 1968 that the army had 425,000 men (p. 385), three field armies (First: Istanbul, Second: Konya, Third: Erzurum), thirteen infantry divisions, one armoured division (with M-47s and M-48s), four armoured brigades (M47 Patton tanks), two armoured cavalry regiment, two mechanised infantry brigades, and two parachute battalions. There was a trained reserve of 450,000.

According to official British military reports in 1974, the Turkish Army included the First Army (2nd, 3rd, 5th, and 15th Corps), Second Army (4th, 6th, and 7th) and Third Army (8th, 9th and 11th Corps). There were also three Interior Zones with three recruit training divisions and four recruit training brigades. For a long period, these formations were grouped under the NATO headquarters Allied Land Forces South-Eastern Europe (LANDSOUTHEAST) in İzmir, led by a Turkish Army four-star General.

Back in the early 1970s, there was a 6th Infantry Division based in Istanbul.

In mid-1982, the Army had two mechanised infantry divisions, and fourteen Infantry Divisions, six armoured brigades, and four mechanised brigades, with 3,000 M48 MBTs, 500 M47 MBTs, as well as 50 Leopard 1A3s, plus another 20 on order, for a total of 3550 main battle tanks. There were another 100 M26 Pershing heavy tanks.

Until the dissolution of the Warsaw Pact in 1990, the Army had a static defense mission of countering any possible attack on Thrace by Soviet/Warsaw Pact forces and deterring Greece, and any attack by the Soviet Transcaucasus Military District on the Caucasus frontier. The Third Army was responsible for holding the Caucasus line with about a third of the Army's total strength of one armoured, two mechanised, and fourteen infantry divisions (1986 data). Soviet forces immediately facing the Third Army in the Caucasus were the 31st Army Corps in the Georgian SSR and the 7th Guards Army in the Armenian SSR. Together the 31st Corps and 7th Guards Army had six divisions (roughly three Category "B" and three "C") plus some immobile fortified defence areas.

Nigel Thomas's NATO Armies 1949–87, published in 1988, attributed the 2nd, 3rd Corps, 5th, and 15th Corps to the First Army; the 6th and 7th Corps to the Second Army, the 4th, 8th, and 9th Corps to the Third Army, and the 11th Corps to the Aegean Army. He wrote that the 11th Corps comprised the 28th and 39th Divisions.

"During 1992 the army introduced a sweeping reorganization, shifting from a predominantly divisional and regimental structure to one based on corps and brigades. The personnel strength of the army was reduced in 1994 to about 393,000 (including about 345,000 conscripts)." When the General Staff attempted to shift 120,000 troops to the frontier with Iraq in 1990, they discovered that there were serious deficiencies in the Army's ability to respond to crises that could erupt suddenly in distant regions.

After the fall of the Soviet Union, LANDSOUTHEAST in İzmir became Joint Command Southeast for a period; it became Allied Air Component Command Izmir in 2004. The headquarters' land-focused roots were revived in the 2010s when NATO's two air commands were reduced into one (at Ramstein, Germany) and Allied Land Command was established at the site.

Lieutenant General Zafer Özkan, the last commander of the 15th Corps in Izmit, retired after serving for two years in August 2005. At that time, the corps was converted to the level of a division.

The TLF has seen frequent recent combat within Turkey and beyond its borders. It is fighting a conflict in south-eastern Turkey against the prolonged Kurdish PKK insurgency, and monitoring ISIS, Russian intervention in Syria, the Kurdish YPG, as well as multiple other elements, in Syria. The TLF took responsibility for Kabul from the British soon after the beginning of the International Security Assistance Force deployments in 2002–2003. It continued to command Regional Command Capital in Kabul for a long period.

=== Updating equipment ===
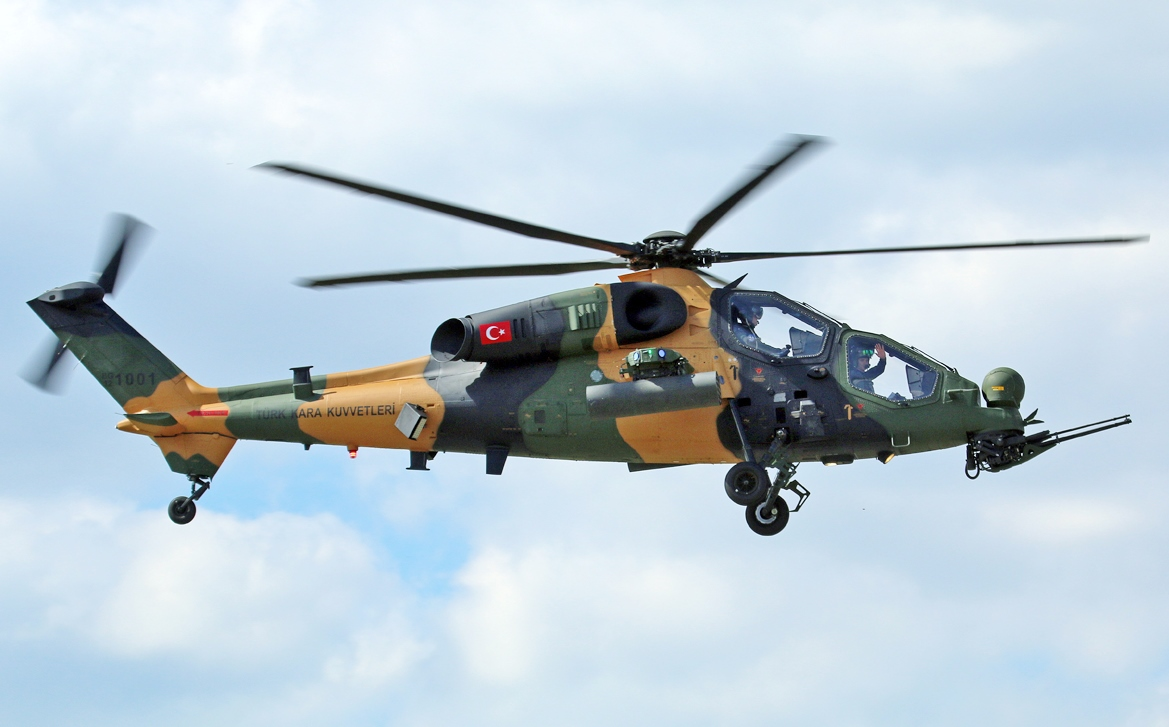
TAI/AgustaWestland T129 ATAK

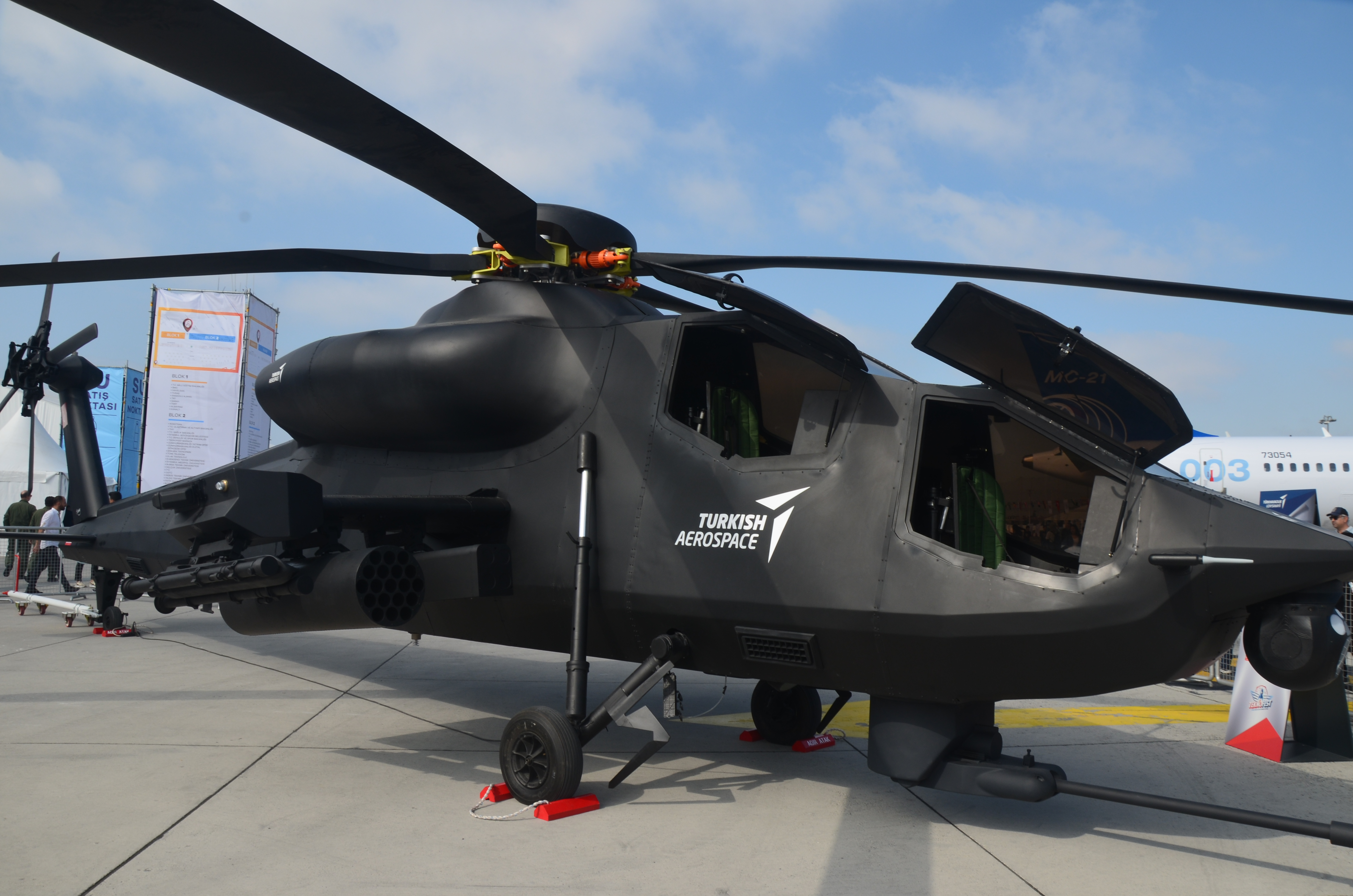
TAI T929 ATAK 2

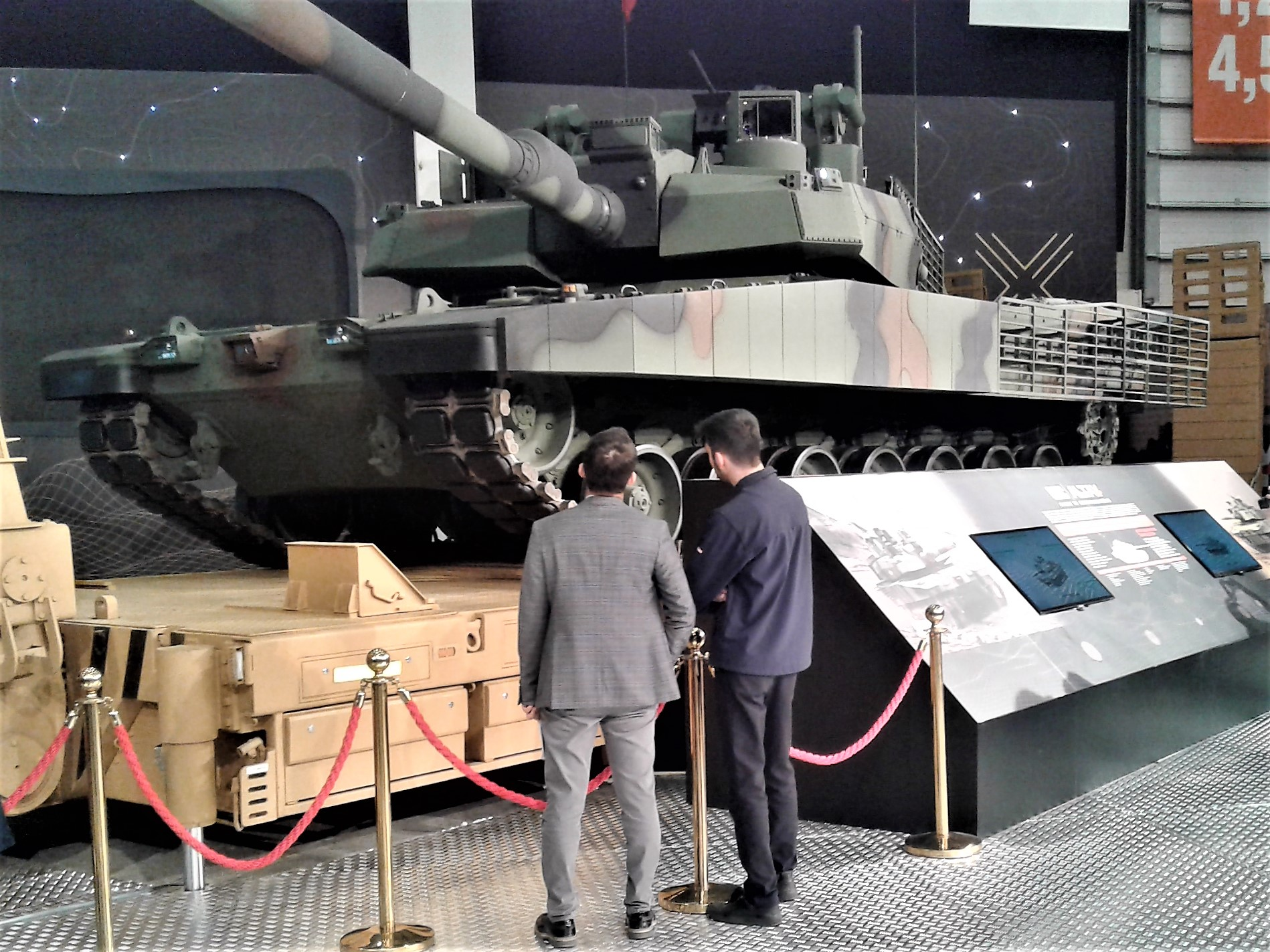
Altay MBT

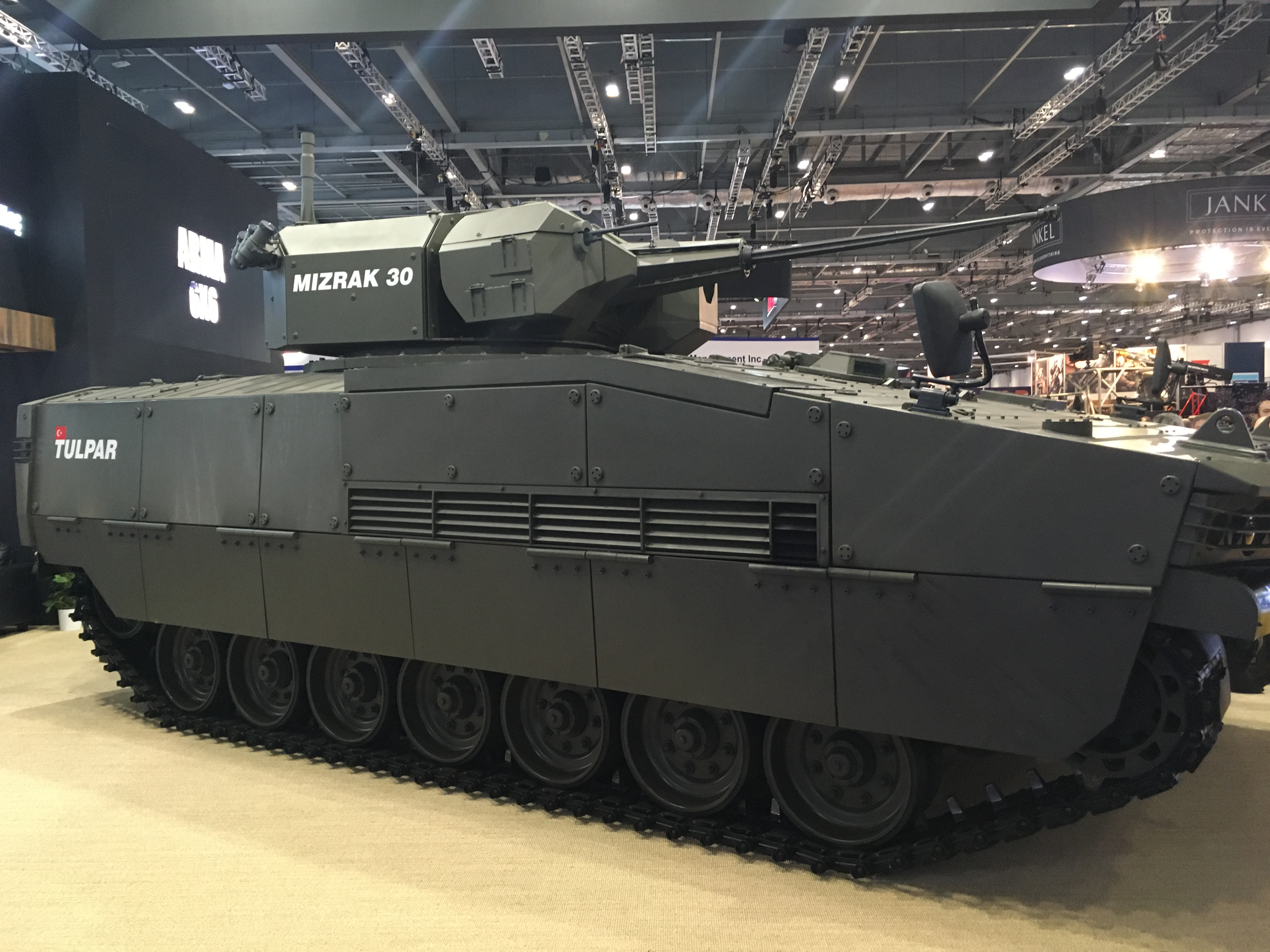
Otokar Tulpar IFV

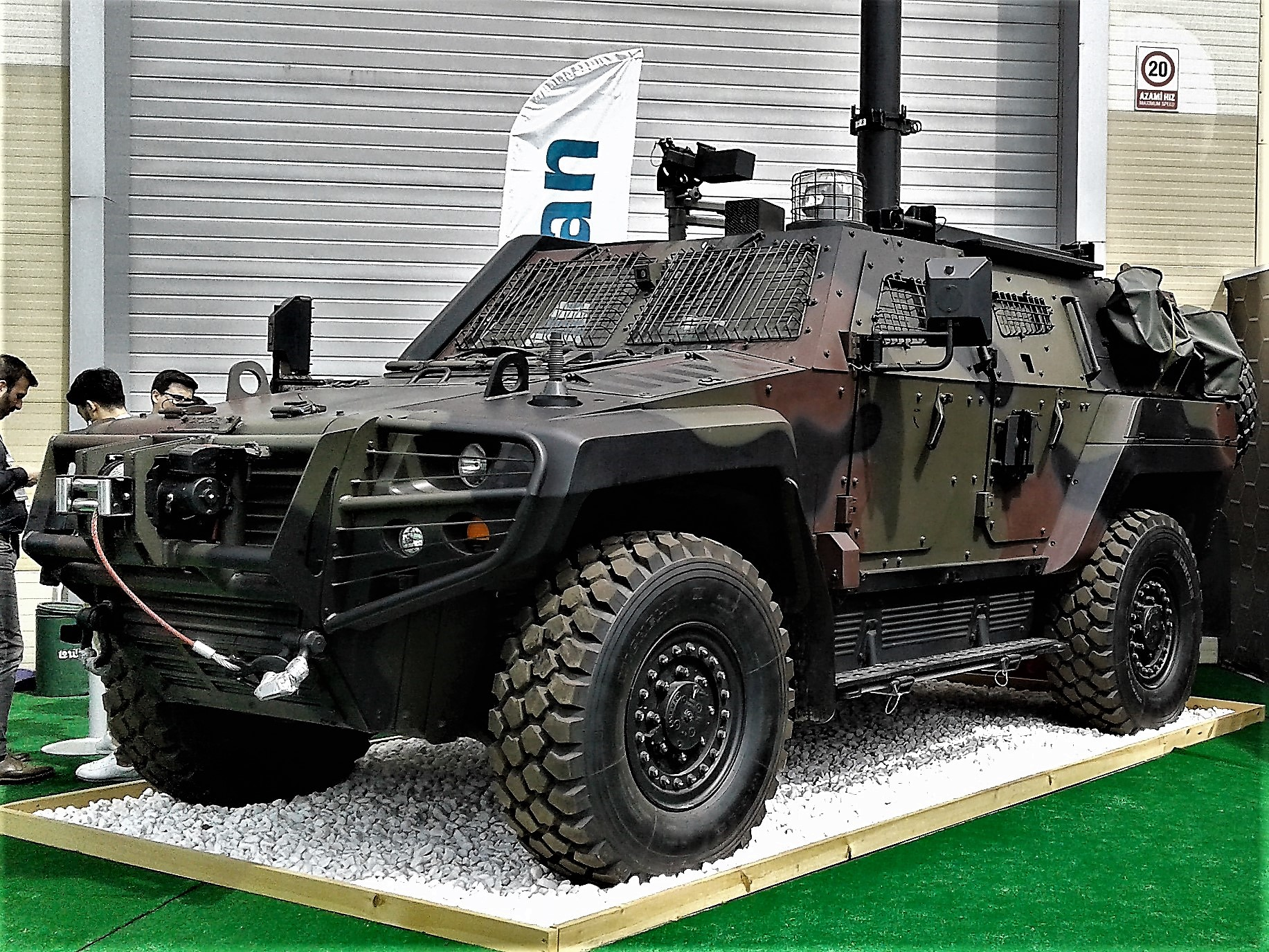
Otokar Cobra II

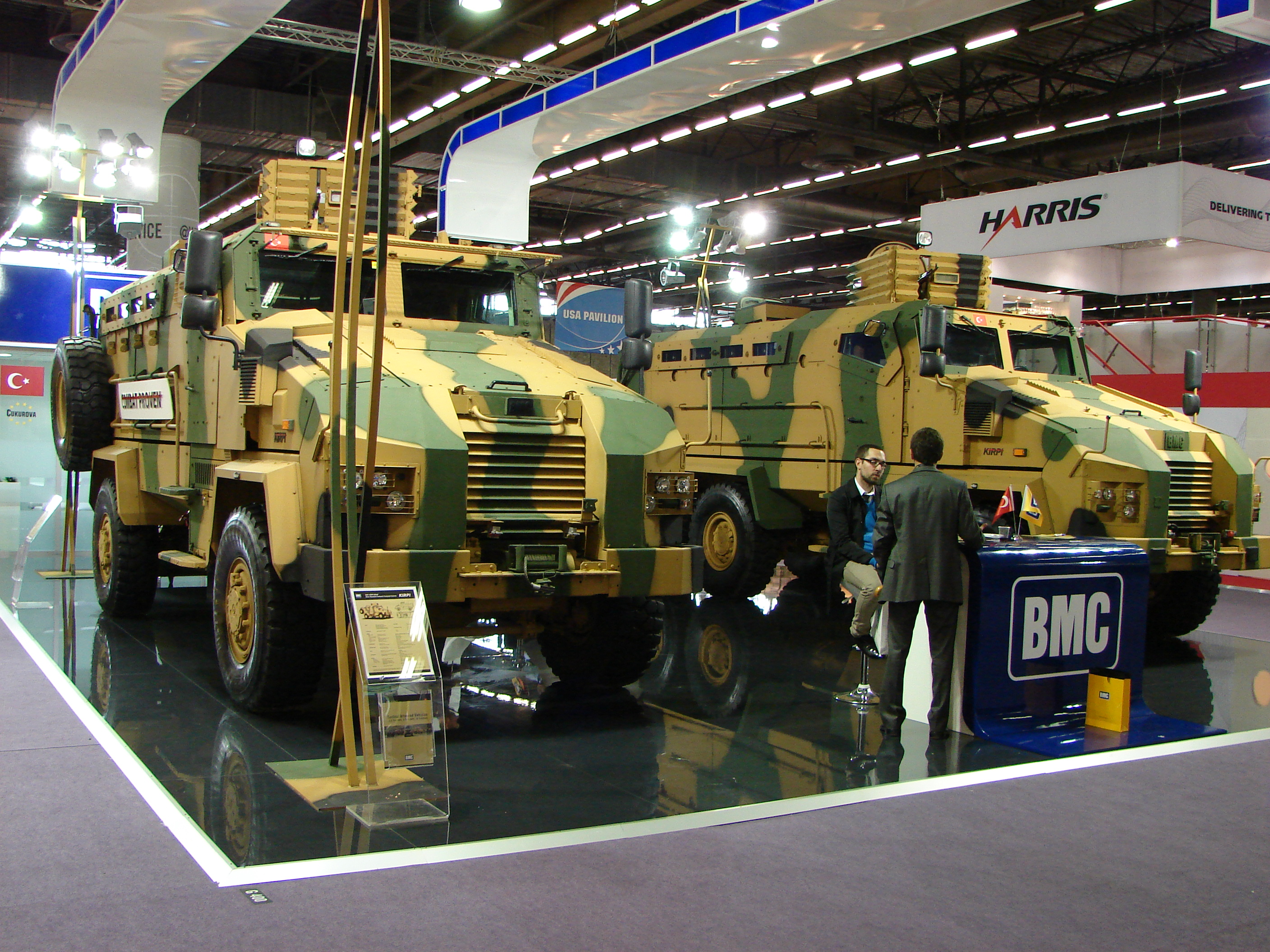
BMC Kirpi MRAP

Towards the end of the 1980s, a restructuring and modernization process has been initiated by the Turkish Armed Forces, which still continues today. The final goal of Turkey is to produce indigenous military equipment and to become increasingly self-sufficient in terms of military technologies.

The then-Army Commander, Gen. Büyükanıt, said of further modernization efforts in 2006:

The Land Forces aim at being equipped with new opportunities and capabilities in order to carry out its duty in full strength against a large variety of threats, varying from classical threats to asymmetrical ones.

The targets for our land forces are to be realized through 'Forces 2014' project. This project aims to shrink the forces without undermining its combat capabilities. On the contrary, under the plan, the efficiency of the force will increase.

Within this period of time, the Land Forces will gradually decrease by 20 to 30 percent in terms of the number of personnel and forces formations. It will be equipped with modern arms and war devices as the distinct features of this new formation. Thus the battle capability will be given to high-ranking brigades. Moreover, with the Combat Zone Management System, the land tactical map will be numerically formed in real-time or close to real-time and a constant tracking will be provided.

— Büyükanıt (The New Anatolian, Evren Değer, 10 August 2006)

At present, the primary main battle tanks of the Turkish Army are the Leopard 2A4 and the M60T. There are also around 400 Leopard 1 and 750 M60 Patton variants in service (excluding the M60T which were upgraded with the 120 mm MG253 guns), but the Turkish Army retains a large number of older vehicles. More than 2,800 M48 Pattons are still in service (upgraded with the 105 mm M68 guns) though only around 1,300 of these are stored as reserve MBTs. The rest of the M48s are mostly transformed into other types of military vehicles (such as cranes, MBT recovery vehicles and logistical support vehicles) or used as spare parts resources.

Turkey plans to build a total of 1,000 new Otokar Altay MBTs, in four separate batches of 250 units, with the MİTÜP Turkish National Tank Project. The tanks will be produced by the Turkish firm Otokar, and share some of the systems that are used in the K2 Black Panther main battle tank of South Korea.

Turkey has signed an agreement with the US to buy fourteen CH-47F Chinook helicopters, for $400 million. Because of financial constraints, however, the Undersecretariat for the Defense Industry, or SSM, Turkey's procurement agency, later wanted to only buy six CH-47Fs, five for the Army and one for the Special Forces, leaving a decision on the remaining eight platforms for the future. Contract negotiations between the SSM, the U.S. government and Boeing were launched in July 2011.

The length of compulsory military service is six months for private and non-commissioned soldiers (the service term for reserve officers chosen among university or college graduates is 12 months). All male Turkish citizens over the age of 20 are required to undergo a one-month military training period, but they can obtain an exemption from the remaining five months of their mandatory service with a paid exemption option.

Turkey has chosen a Chinese defence firm to co-produce a US$4 billion long-range air and missile defence system FD-2000, rejecting rival bids from Russian, US and European firms. The Turkish defence minister announced the decision to award the contract to China Precision Machinery Import and Export Corp (CPMIEC) in a statement on Thursday, September 26, 2013. NATO has said that missiles should be compatible.

In 2017, Turkey has bought the anti-aircraft S-400 missile system from Russia.

== Structure ==
The structure of the Turkish Army has historically had two facets: operational and administrative. The operational chain consists of the field fighting formations, and the administrative the arms and service branches – infantry, armour, artillery etc.

=== Operational organisation ===
The army's 14 armoured brigades were the most powerful brigades after the reorganization of the early 1990s; each includes 2 armoured, 2 mechanised infantry and 2 self-propelled artillery battalions. In late 1994, the 17 mechanised brigades each have 1 armoured, 2 mechanised and one artillery battalion. The army's nine infantry brigades each had 4 infantry battalions and one artillery battalion, while the 4 commando brigades had 3 commando battalions.

From 1992 the Army began to change from a corps-division-regiment structure to a corps-brigade arrangement, retaining only three divisions. Divisions remained on Cyprus and for certain special other cases, such as for NATO's reaction forces. In accordance with NATO's new strategy in the early 1990s, Turkey agreed to commit forces to NATO's ACE Rapid Reaction Corps. Therefore, the decision was made to create a new division. The old 1 Inf Div which had been abolished many years ago was reactivated and renamed as 1 TU Mech Inf Div and attached to 4 TU Corps on 30 November 1993. This division appears to have been replaced within 3rd Corps by the 52nd Armoured Division, formed later on.

The Military Balance, 1994–1995 also lists the following units: the Presidential Guard Regiment, an infantry regiment, 5 border defense regiments (Brigades (?)), and 26 border defense battalions. The fate of these independent units under the reorganization remains unclear.

In late 2002, the 3rd Corps, with its headquarters near Istanbul, was certified as one of the six NATO High Readiness Force-Land (HRF-L) headquarters and gained the additional title of the Rapidly Deployable Turkish Corps (RDTC). A year later, Jane's Defence Weekly reported on 9 July 2003 that as part of force restructuring, its 4 existing armies would be reorganized into a Western Army, in Istanbul, and the Eastern Army would replace 2nd Army in Malatya. This plan does not appear to have been carried out.

The Army announced plans in mid-2004 to abolish four brigades across Turkey. The arms and equipment of the brigades closed were to be kept in depots. The plan involved the disbandment of:

- The 33rd Mechanized Brigade in Kırklareli on the north-west border
- The 7th Mechanized Brigade in Kars/Kağızman near the eastern border with Armenia
- The 10th Infantry Brigade in Van/Erciş on the eastern border with Iran
- The 9th Armoured Brigade in Çankırı in central Anatolia

The IISS Military Balance 2008 listed the Turkish Land Forces with four Army headquarters (HQ), 10 corps HQ, 17 armoured brigades, 15 mechanised infantry brigades, two infantry divisions, 11 infantry brigades, one Special Force command HQ, five commando brigades, one combat helicopter battalion, four aviation regiments, three aviation battalions (totalling 1 transport and 2 training battalions), and 4 training/artillery brigades.

By 2022 the force included four army HQs, nine corps HQs, eight commando brigades, one mountain commando brigade, one commando regiment, one armoured division, seven armoured brigades, two mechanised divisions, 14 mechanised brigades, one motorised infantry division with three motorised regiments, seven motorised infantry brigades, two artillery, one training artillery brigades, six artillery regiments, two engineer regiments, four aviation regiments, and four aviation battalions.

=== List of formations and units ===
Turkish Army corps locations (2008)
Key: 2 (1) – 2nd Corps, 1st Army

A basic organigram on the official Turkish Land Forces (Turkish: Kara Kuvvetleri Komutanlığı (KKK)) website shows the First, Second, Third, and Aegean Armies, the 4th Corps, the force in Northern Cyprus, the Training and Doctrine Command, and the Logistics Command as directly subordinated to the Chief of the Land Forces.

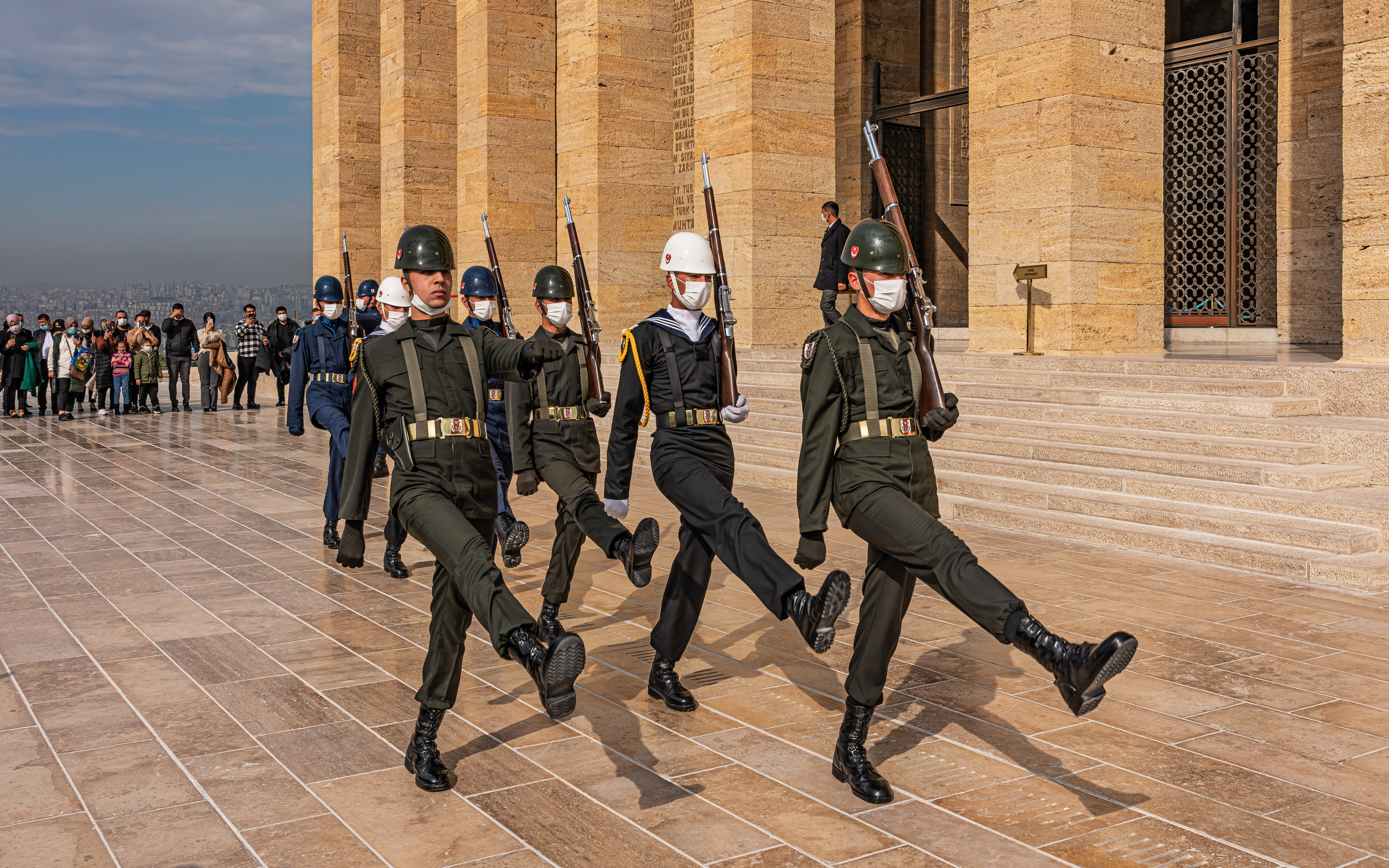
Honorary guards at Anıtkabir

The Turkish Army is organised into the following commands:

- General Staff controlled units (Güvercinlik Army Air Base, Ankara)
  - Special Aviation Group Command
  - General Staff Electronic Systems (GES) Aviation Group Command
  - Mapping General Command
  - Unmanned Aerial Vehicle Center Command (Batman Air Base)
- Chief of Land Forces – Ankara
  - First Army (Istanbul)
    - 2nd Corps (Gelibolu, Çanakkale)
      - 4th Mechanized Infantry Brigade (Keşan)
      - 8th Mechanized Infantry Brigade (Tekirdağ)
      - 18th Mechanized Infantry Brigade (Çanakkale)
      - 95th Armored Brigade (Malkara)
      - 102nd Artillery Regiment (Uzunköprü)
      - 41st Commando Brigade (Vize)
      - Corps Engineer Combat Regiment (Gelibolu)
    - 3rd Corps (NATO Rapid Deployment Corps, Şişli, Istanbul)
      - 52nd Tactical Armored Division (Hadımköy, Istanbul)
        - 2nd Armored Brigade (Kartal)
        - 3rd Armored Brigade (Çerkezköy)
        - 66th Mechanized Infantry Brigade (Istanbul)
      - 23rd Tactical Motorized Infantry Division (Hasdal, Istanbul)
        - 6th Motorized Infantry Regiment (Hasdal, Istanbul)
        - 23rd Motorized Infantry Regiment (Samandıra, Istanbul)
        - 47th Motorized Infantry Regiment (Metris, Istanbul)
    - 5th Corps (Çorlu, Tekirdağ)
      - 1st Armored Brigade (Babaeski)
      - 54th Mechanized Infantry Brigade (Edirne)
      - 55th Mechanized Infantry Brigade (Süloğlu)
      - 65th Mechanized Infantry Brigade (Lüleburgaz)
      - Corps Armored Cavalry Battalion (Ulaş)
      - 105th Artillery Regiment (Çorlu)
      - Corps Engineer Combat Regiment (Pınarhisar)
    - 15th Infantry Division (Köseköy, İzmit)
  - 2nd Army (Malatya)
    - 4th Corps(Ankara)
      - 28th Mechanized Infantry Brigade (Mamak)
      - 58th Artillery Regiment (Polatlı)
      - 1st Commando Brigade (Talas)
      - 2nd Commando Brigade (Bolu)
    - 6th Corps (Adana)
      - 5th Armored Brigade (Gaziantep)
      - 39th Mechanized Infantry Brigade (İskenderun)
      - 106th Artillery Regiment (Islahiye)
    - 7th Corps (Diyarbakır)
      - 3rd Tactical Infantry Division (Yüksekova)
      - 34th Border Brigade (Şemdinli)
      - 16th Mechanized Brigade (Diyarbakır)
      - 20th Mechanized Brigade (Şanlıurfa)
      - 70th Mechanized Infantry Brigade (Mardin)
      - 172nd Armored Brigade (Silopi)
      - 2nd Motorized Infantry Brigade (Lice)
      - 6th Motorized Infantry Brigade (Akçay)
      - 3rd Commando Brigade (Siirt)
      - 107th Artillery Regiment (Siverek)
      - Hakkari Mountain Warfare and Commando Brigade (hakkari)
  - 3rd Army (Erzincan)
    - 8th Corps (Elazığ)
      - 1st Mechanized Infantry Brigade (Doğubeyazıt)
      - 12th Mechanized Infantry Brigade (Ağrı)
      - 10th Motorized Infantry Brigade (Tatvan)
      - 34th Motorized Infantry Brigade (Patnos)
      - 49th Motorized Infantry Brigade (Bingöl)
      - 51st Motorized Infantry Brigade (Hozat)
      - 4th Commando Brigade (Tunceli)
      - 108th Artillery Regiment (Erciş)
      - 17th Motorized Infantry Brigade (Kiğı)
    - 9th Corps (Erzurum)
      - 4th Armored Brigade (Palandöken)
      - 14th Mechanized Infantry Brigade (Kars)
      - 25th Mechanized Infantry Brigade (Ardahan)
      - 9th Motorized Infantry Brigade (Sarıkamış)
      - 48th Motorized Infantry Brigade (Trabzon)
      - 109th Artillery Regiment (Erzurum)
  - Aegean Army (İzmir)
    - Cyprus Turkish Peace Force Command
      - 28th Infantry Division – headquartered at Asha (Paşaköy) to the northeast of Nicosia
      - 39th Mechanized Infantry Division – headquartered at Camlibel within the district of Girne.
      - 14th Armored Brigade – in Kythrea with M48A5PI Patton tanks.
      - A Special Force Regiment
      - An Artillery Regiment
      - Naval units
    - Logistics Division (Balıkesir)
    - 57th Artillery Training Brigade (İzmir)
    - 19th Infantry Brigade (Edremit)
    - 11th Motorised Infantry Brigade (Denizli)
    - 5th Army Aviation School Command (Muğla)
    - 2nd Infantry Regiment (Muğla)
    - Mountain Commando School and Training Centre (tr:Dağ Komando Okulu ve Eğitim Merkezi) (Eğirdir, Isparta)
  - Training and Doctrine Command (Ankara)
    - As of 2018, three infantry training brigades, including 15th Infantry Training Brigade at General Hikmet Akinci Barracks, Amasya, which includes two infantry training regiments.
    - 3rd Infantry Training Brigade (Antalya)
    - 1st Infantry Training Brigade (Manisa)
  - Logistics Command (Ankara)
  - Turkish Military Academy (Ankara)
  - Turkish Army Aviation Command
    - Army Aviation School Command (Güvercinlik Army Air Base)
    - 1st Army Aviation Regiment (Güvercinlik Army Air Base)
    - 2nd Army Aviation Regiment (Malatya Erhaç Airport)
    - 3rd Army Aviation Regiment (Gaziemir Air Base, İzmir)
    - 4th Army Aviation Regiment (Samandıra Army Air Base, Istanbul)
      - 7th Army Aviation Group Command (Diyarbakır Air Base)
      - Northern Cyprus Turkish Army Aviation Unit Command (Karter Air Base, Pınarbaşı)
    - 5th Main Maintenance Center Command

=== Administrative branches ===
Combatant

- General Staff
- Infantry
- Cavalry
- Armoury
- Army aviation

Battle Supporting

- Artillery
- Bulwark
- Air defence
- Correspondence
- Intelligence

Battle Supporting & Service

- Communications
- Ordnance
- Supplies
- Personnel
- Cartography
- Transportation
- Finance
- Instructor
- Legal
- Military Band
- Medical, Dental and Pharmaceutical Corps
- Veterinary Corps
- Engineer, Chemist and Technician Corps

== Equipment ==
The Ottoman and Turkish Armies (TLF) have used a wide range of equipment and vehicles in the 20th and 21st centuries. Among them was the venerable and reliable Vickers machine gun, introduced after World War I.

== Insignia and ranks ==
Turkish Land Forces has NATO-compatible rank system.

Officers 1-10 (OF 1-10)

NATO code	OF-10	OF-9	OF-8	OF-7	OF-6	OF-5	OF-4	OF-3	OF-2	OF-1
Turkish Land Forces
Turkish Land Forces	Mareşal	Orgeneral	Korgeneral	Tümgeneral	Tuğgeneral	Albay	Yarbay	Binbaşı	Yüzbaşı	Üsteğmen	Teğmen	Asteğmen

Other Ranks 1-9 (OR 1-9)

NATO code	OR-9	OR-8	OR-7	OR-6	OR-5			OR-4		OR-3		OR-2	OR-1
Turkish Land Forces													No insignia
Turkish Land Forces	Astsubay kıdemli başçavuş	Astsubay başçavuş	Astsubay kıdemli üstçavuş	Astsubay üstçavuş	Astsubay kıdemli çavuş	Astsubay çavuş	Astsubay astçavuş	Uzman çavuş	Çavuş	Uzman onbaşı	Onbaşı		Er

- Non-Turkish speakers might like to know that OF3, OF2, and OR2 literally translates as "Head of 1000", "Head of 100", and "Head of 10", respectively.
