= 70th Mechanized Infantry Brigade =

- Country: Turkey
- Branch: Turkish Army
- Type: Infantry
- Role: Syrian border protection
- Size: Unknown
- Part of: 7th Corps (Turkey)
- Garrison/HQ: Kızıltepe, Mardin Province

Commanders
- Current commander: Brig. Gen. Lokman Ali Yılmaz (November 2012)

The 70th Mechanized Infantry Brigade (Turkish: 70. Mekanize Piyade Tugayı) is a brigade of the Turkish Army based in the Southeastern Anatolia Region at the town of Kızıltepe in Mardin Province. It is part of the Army's 7th Corps based at Diyarbakir.

The brigade appears to be a descendant of the 70th Infantry Brigade, which in 1974, according to the reports of the British Defence Attaché in Ankara, was based in Siirt and was part of 7th Corps. According to the same reports, at the time, 7th Corps comprised 70th Infantry Brigade alongside the 20th Mechanized Infantry Brigade at Urfa and the 16th Mechanized Infantry Brigade at Diyarbakır.

The brigade in Kızıltepe is headquartered at the Selen Barracks and consists of the 8th Mechanized Infantry Regiment, which has three border battalions in İdil, Nusaybin and Şenyurt at the Syrian border. In March 1983, the battalions were deployed to Nusaybin, and then were stationed in the districts of Mardin Province with the headquarters in Midyat.

== 7th Corps subunits ==
Units circa 2010:

- 3rd Tactical Infantry Division (Yüksekova)
  - 34th Border Brigade (Şemdinli)
  - 16th Mechanized Brigade (Diyarbakir)
  - 20th Armored Brigade (Şanlıurfa)
  - 70th Mechanized Infantry Brigade (Mardin)
    - 8th Mechanized Infantry Regiment (Kızıltepe)
  - 172nd Armored Brigade (Silopi)
  - 2nd Motorized Infantry Brigade
  - 6th Motorized Infantry Brigade (Akçay)
  - 3rd Commando Brigade (Siirt)
    - 107th Field Artillery Regiment (Siverek)
  - Hakkari Mountain and Commando Brigade (Hakkari)
