= Amphibious Marine Brigade (Turkish Armed Forces) =

Amphibious Marine Infantry Brigade
- Amfibi Deniz Piyade Tugayı
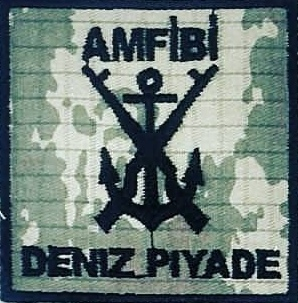
- Founded: 1966
- Country: Turkey
- Branch: Turkish Naval Forces
- Type: Marines
- Size: Brigade
- Brigade: Foça, İzmir
- Nickname: Turkish Crocodiles
- Mottos: "Always Ready!" "Once a marine, always a marine"
- Colors: Green
- March: Alay marşı
- Mascot: Crocodile
- Engagements: Operation Atilla; Kurdish–Turkish conflict; Albanian Rebellion of 1997; KFOR; ISAF

Insignia
- Abbreviation: AMFİBİ

The Amphibious Marine Brigade (Turkish: Amfibi Deniz Piyade Tugayı), also known as Amphibious Commando (Turkish: Amfibi Komando), is the marine corps special operations capable unit of the Turkish Naval Forces based in Foça near İzmir, three amphibious battalions, an MBT battalion, an artillery battalion, a support battalion and other company-sized units.

== History ==
The modern history of Turkish Marine Brigade, under the command of the Turkish Amphibious Group, began in 1966 with the formation of Amphibious Marine Infantry Brigade Command's first Amphibious Landing Forces, constituting the 1st Marine Infantry Battalion, was formed with Vice Admiral Kemal Kayacan's encouragement on 15 September 1966 at the Garrison of Golcük. The Forces Headquarters was established in Mersin in April 1971. The 2nd Amphibious Marine Infantry Battalion was founded in 1973, and the headquarters of the Amphibious Marine Infantry Regiment was constituted on 18 April 1974, completed prior to the Invasion of Cyprus.

The Amphibious Marine Infantry Regiment operated on July 20, 1974, during intervention to Cyprus by sea, secured the beachhead and contributed to significant success. Amphibious Marine Infantry Regiment also participated in the Second Peace Operation, with the success of given tasks fulfilled. Due to the success in Cyprus Peace Operation, on November 15, 1983, Chief of the General Staff awarded the Gold "Outstanding courage and Self-sacrifice" medal.

After the invasion of Cyprus in 1974, the 3rd Naval Infantry Battalion, the Amphibious Support Battalion, was formed in 1979 in Izmir. This completed the organization of the unit at the regimental level. In 1980, the 3rd Amphibious Marine Infantry Battalion temporarily deployed to Mersin to complete martial law executive tasks. In the period 1985–1992 many domestic and overseas drills were conducted, the Aegean Sea and the Mediterranean deterrence tasks were performed successfully. The Amphibious Marine İnfantry Regiment also participated operations in Syria and Libya under the leadership of Admiral Gürsel Çaypınar.

== Gallery ==
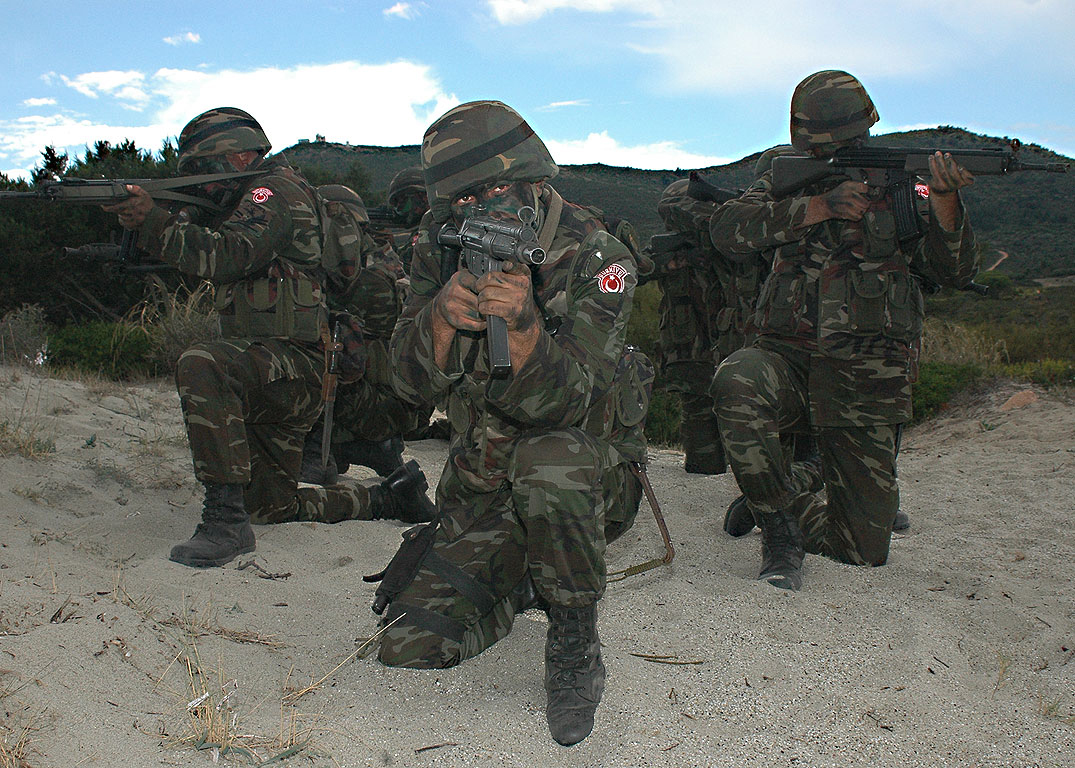
Turkish marine personnel on the Italian island of Sardinia during the Destined Glory 2005 (Loyal Midas) military exercise

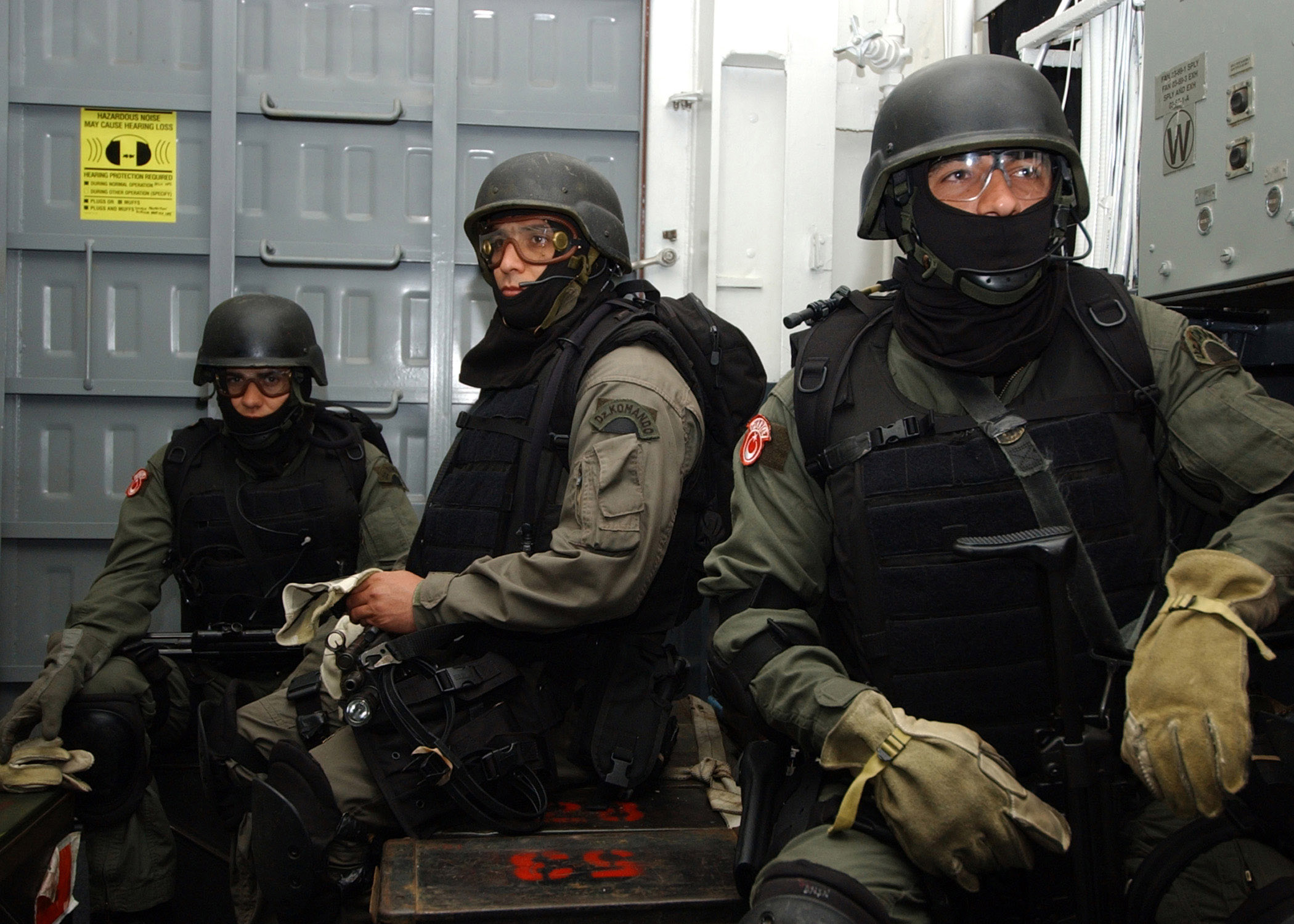
Turkish marines aboard USS Nassau stand by to conduct maritime interdiction operations, as part of exercise Phoenix Express 2007

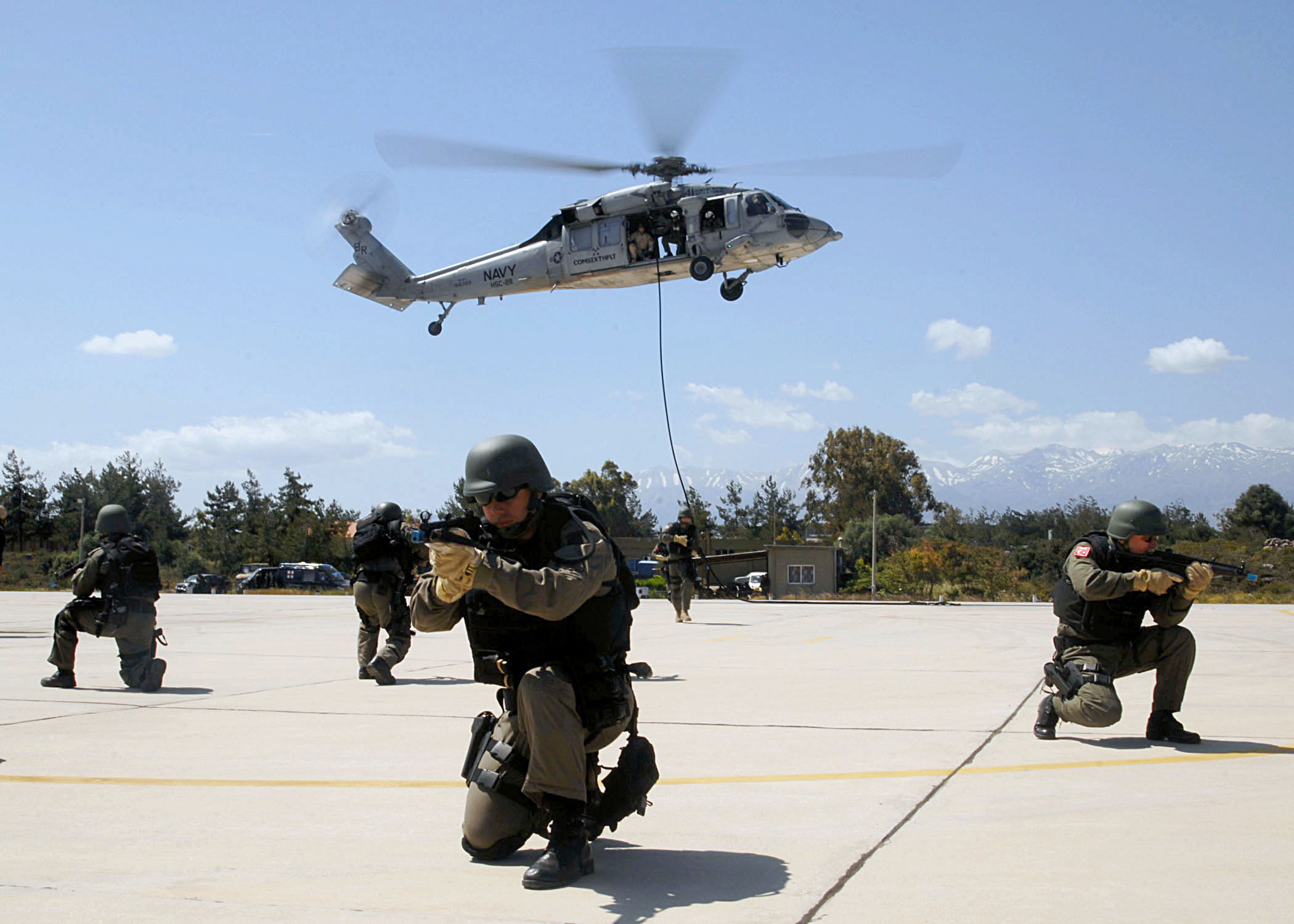
Amphibious Marines perform fast-rope exercises from a U.S. Navy MH-60S Sea Hawk helicopter during exercise Phoenix Express in 2009

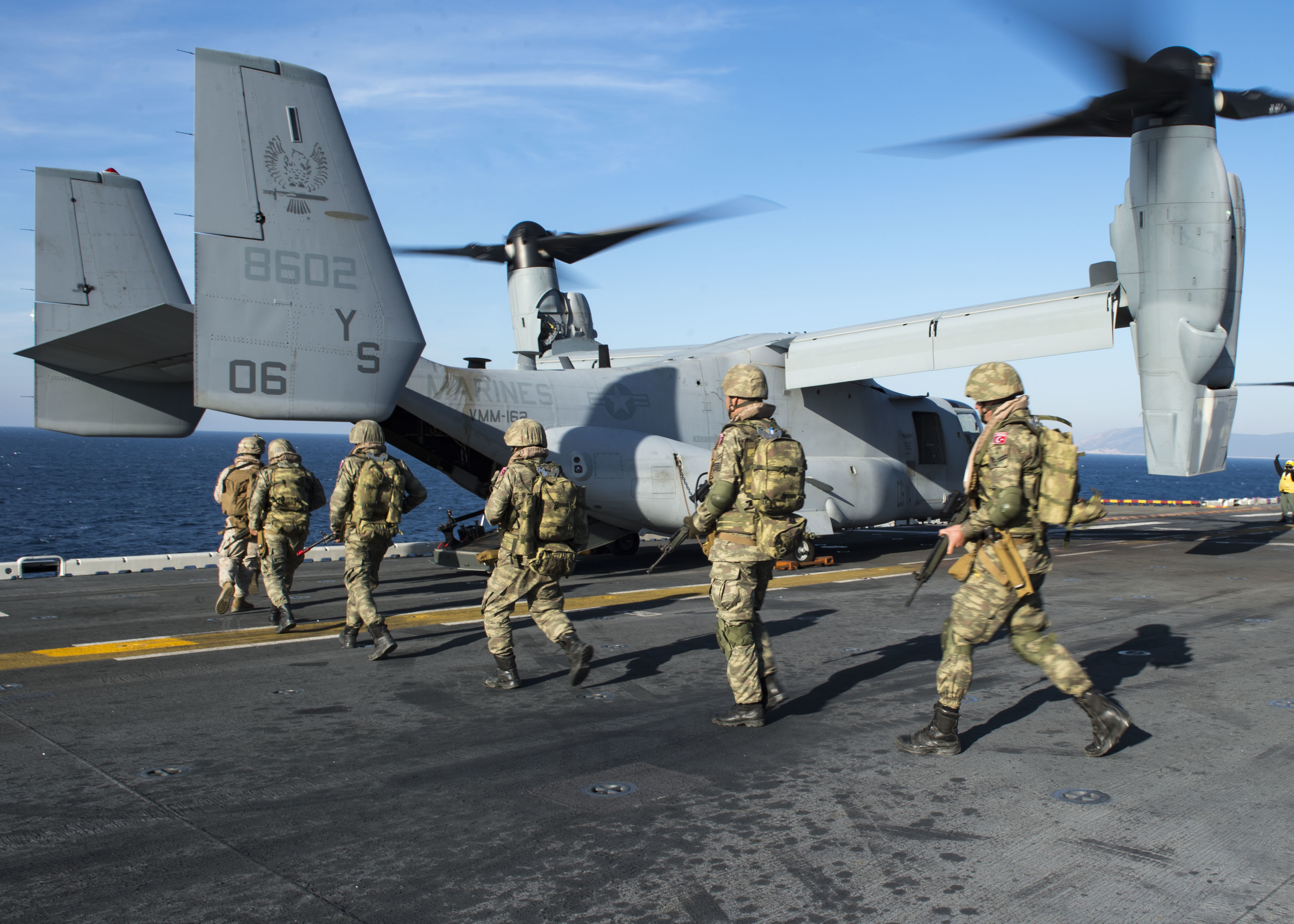
Turkish Marines board an MV-22 Osprey on the flight deck of the USS Kearsarge while participating in Turkish-led and hosted amphibious exercise Exercise Egemen

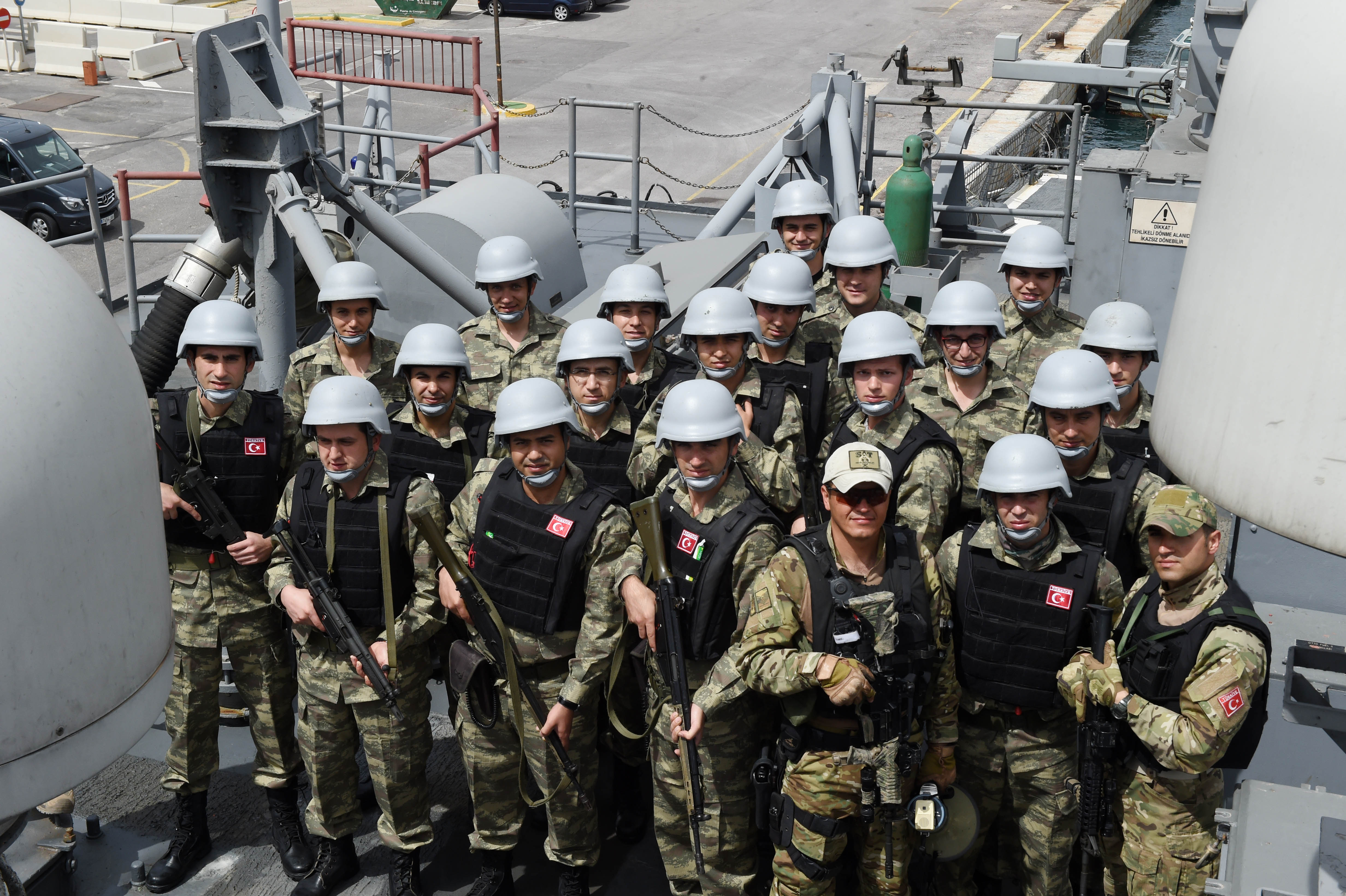
Turkish boarding teams pose for a group photo aboard the Turkish frigate TCG Gokceada (F-494) during exercise Phoenix Express 2017 in Cartagena, Spain

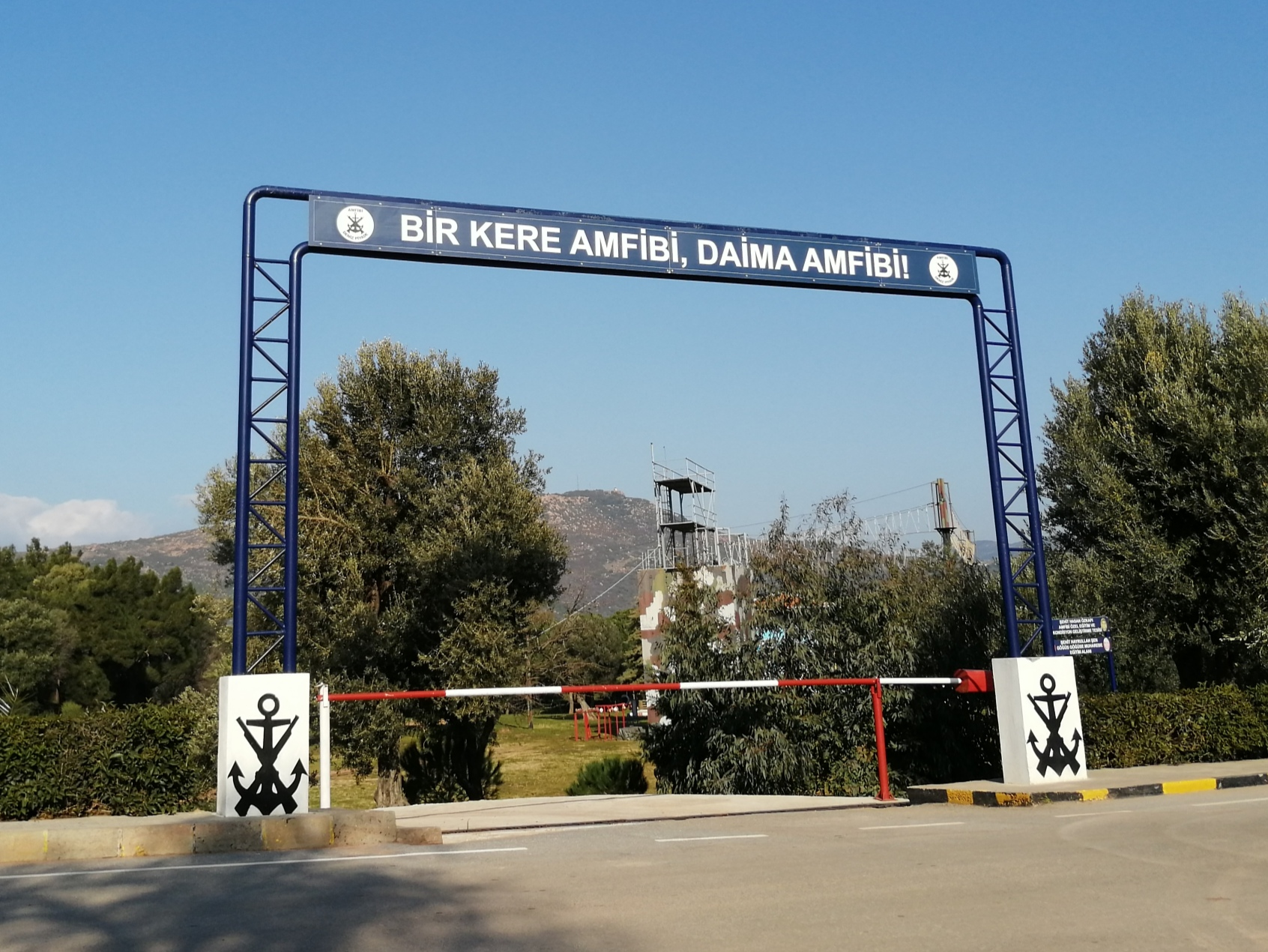
"Once a marine, always a marine" motto, at the entrance of an exercise area

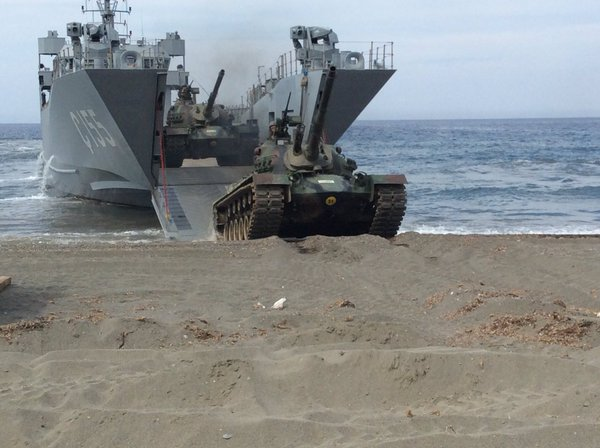
Turkish armored forces conduct amphibious assault in support of a 173rd Airborne Brigade ground assault during exercise EFES 2016 in Turkey

== See also ==
- List of Turkish Commando Brigades
