= 39th Mechanized Infantry Division (Turkey) =

Turkish military unit

39th Infantry Division (Turkey)
- 39'uncu Mekanize Piyade Tümen
- Country: Turkey
- Part of: Cyprus Turkish Peace Force Command
- Garrison/HQ: Myrtou, Cyprus 35°18′46″N 33°3′44″E
- Engagements: Turkish invasion of Cyprus

Commanders
- Current commander: Brigadier General Ahmet Burak YÜRÜTEN

The 39th Mechanized Infantry Division is an infantry formation of the Turkish Land Forces.

In 1941 it was part of 17th Corps at Maras. It was part of the initial set of divisions and brigades discussed with NATO for support after Turkey joined NATO in 1952.

It was deployed from the mainland to Cyprus for the Turkish invasion of Cyprus in 1974, under Major General Bedrettin Demirel.

On landing it immediately became involved in the Battle of Pentemili beachhead. The Turkish landing forces, under the command of Brig. Gen Tuncer, consisted of the "Cakmak" Special Strike Force Landing Brigade, one battalion of the Amphibious Infantry Regiment under Lt. Cdr Ikiz, the 50th Infantry Regiment of the 39th Infantry Division under Col. Karaoglanoglu and one company of the 39th Divisional Tank Battalion (39th Infantry Division). This force consisted of around 3,000 troops, 12 M47 tanks and 20 M113 armoured personnel carriers, as well as 12 105mm howitzers. The landing was not contested until the first wave of Turkish forces were already ashore.

Other units that formed part of the 39th Division during the invasion were the 14th and 49th Infantry Regiments, as well as the 39th Artillery Regiment.

Since the 1970s the division has formed part of 11th Corps/Cyprus Turkish Peace Forces. Necdet Ozel commanded the division from 1999 for two-three years.

The 39th Artillery Regiment was reported as conducting UAV training in 2025 at the Beyköy Shooting and Exercise Area in Nicosia.
