= Kythrea =

Kythrea: Κυθρέα (Greek); Değirmenlik (Turkish)
- Municipality
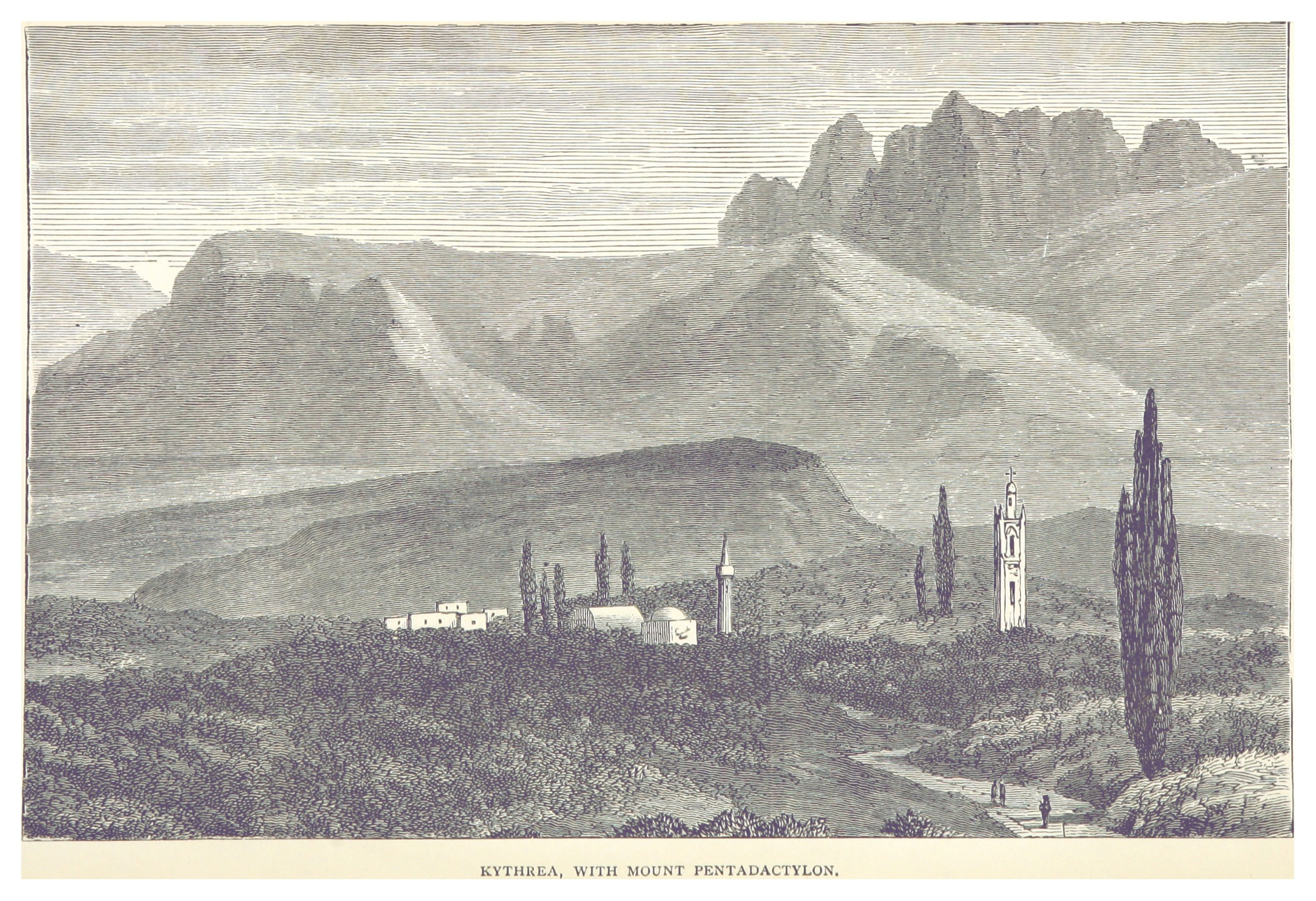

- Location within Cyprus
- Coordinates: 35°15′N 33°29′E
- Country (de jure): Cyprus
  - District: Nicosia District
- Country (de facto): Northern Cyprus
  - District: Lefkoşa District

Government
  - Mayor: Ali Karavezirler (CTP)
  - Mayor-in-exile: Petros M. Kareklas

Population (2011)
  - Total: 3,284
  - Municipality: 17,213
- Website: Greek Cypriot municipality (in exile); Turkish Cypriot municipality

Kythrea (Greek: Κυθρέα or Κυθραία; Turkish: Değirmenlik) is a small town in Cyprus under the control of Northern Cyprus. It is 10 km (6.2 mi) northeast of Nicosia.

== History ==
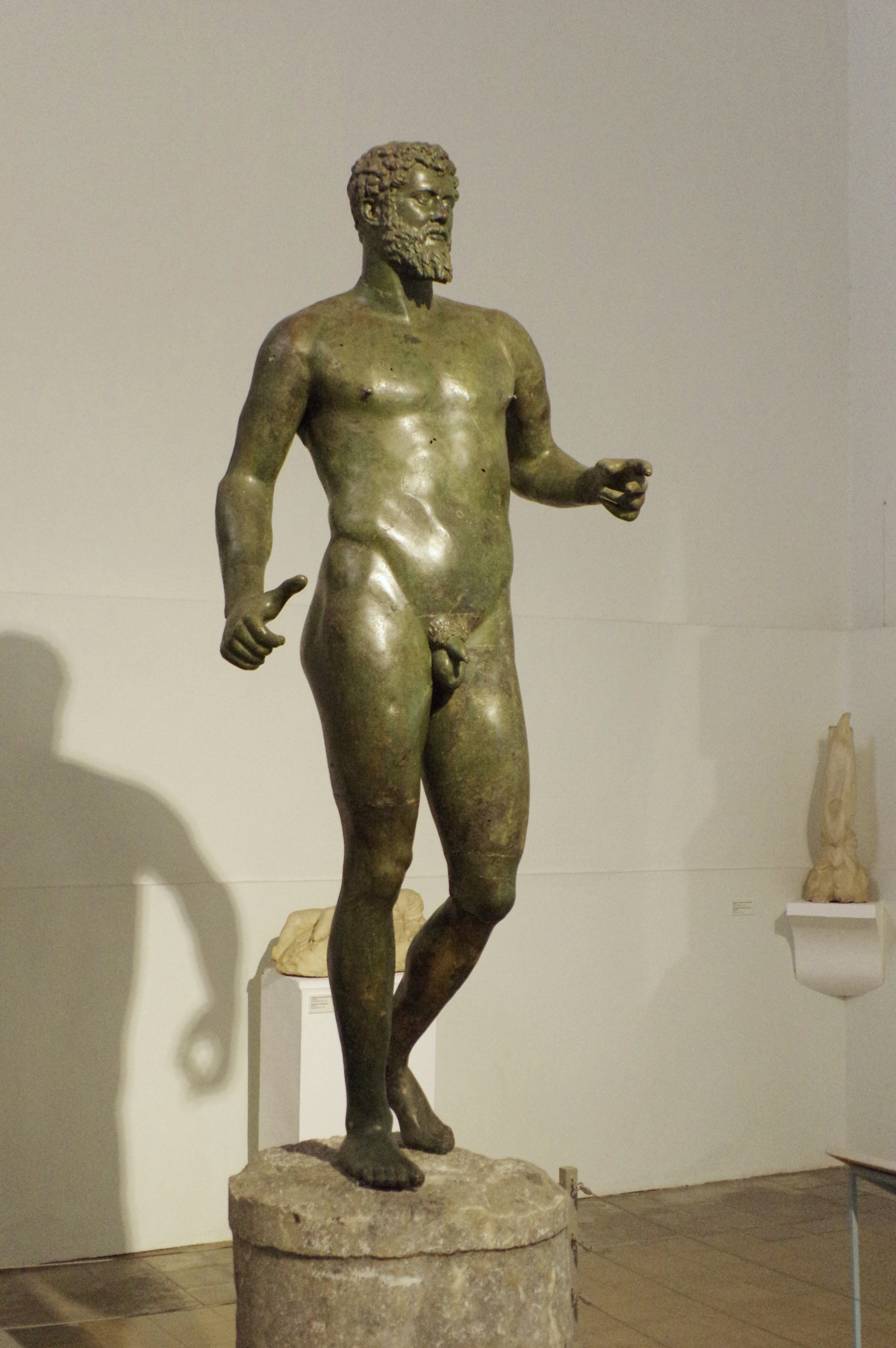
The larger-than-life bronze statue of Septimius Severus, found in Kythrea, now displayed in Cyprus Museum

Kythrea is situated near the ancient Greek city-kingdom of Chytri, which was founded by Chytros, son of Alexander the Great and grandson of the grandson of the Athenian king Akamas. According to one tradition, the name Kythrea derives from Chytri (Χύτροι > *Χυτρέα > Κυθρέα). According to another tradition, it derives from the name of the Greek Ionian island Kythira, from where millstones were transferred to Kythrea's watermills. The Delphic Theorodochoi inscription mentions Chytri.

With the spread of Christianity in Cyprus, Chytri became a bishopric. The first bishop, whose name is known is Pappus, is mentioned in the Life of Epiphanius of Salamis as having been bishop for 58 years of the "miserable town of Chytria", and as having died a martyr at an unspecified date, which must have been under either the pagan emperors Licinius or Maximinus Daza, or the Arian Constantius II. The acts of the Council of Chalcedon (451) show that Bishop Photinus was represented there by his deacon Dionysius, and those of the Second Council of Nicaea in 767 that Bishop Spyridon attended in person.

Contemporary documents are lacking concerning Demetrianus, whom Henri Grégoire described as perhaps the most obscure of the local saints of Cyprus. The medieval Leontios Machairas is the earliest writer to mention his name. According to the oldest Life of Demetrianos, published in the 18th century, he became bishop c. 885, was captured by Arabs and taken to Egypt with many of his faithful, but by his prayers obtained the liberation of all.

Chytri is no longer a residential bishopric and today the Catholic Church lists it as a titular see.

Kythrea is a remarkable archaeological area. One outstanding statue discovered in the area is the bronze statue of Roman Emperor Septimius Severus, exhibited in the Cyprus Museum in Nicosia.

In the Middle Ages, Kythrea hosted flourmills that belonged to the King of Cyprus, powered by its water springs. At the end of the 13th century, flour produced in the Kythrea mills provided the supply for the production of bread in the capital, Nicosia.

The Kythrea municipality was established in 1915.

The small town was watered for millennia by the Kefalovrysos spring; however, shortly after the 1974 Turkish invasion, the water stopped flowing. Other forms of the name include Chytri, Cythraia, Cythereia, Cythroi, Chytrides, Chytros and Chytria. The majority of the survivors of the 1974 Alaminos massacre found refugee in Kythrea.

== Administration ==
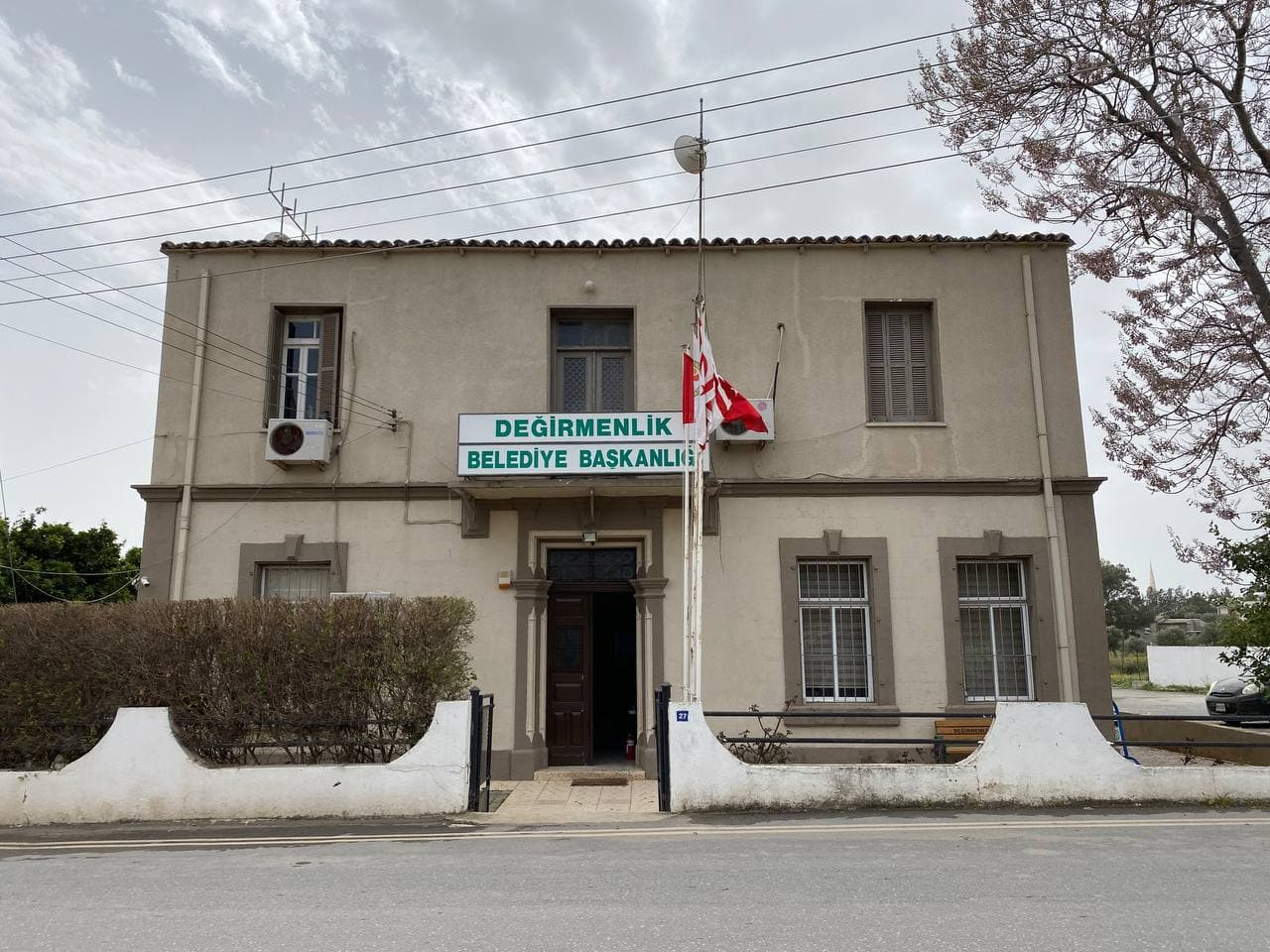
The building of the Head of Municipality of Değirmenlik

The town is administered by the Turkish Cypriot Municipality of Değirmenlik founded in 1975. The current mayor is Ali Karavezirler from the Republican Turkish Party. He was elected to the post in 2018, garnering 54.1% of the votes. He replaced Osman Işısal, the mayor elected in 2014 from the same party.

Displaced inhabitants of Kythrea, now located in Nicosia and elsewhere, maintain a municipality in exile. It shares premises with the similarly displaced municipality of Lapithos at 37 Ammochostou Street, Nicosia.

== Demographics ==
After its Greek Cypriot inhabitants were displaced in August 1974, the town was repopulated by displaced Turkish Cypriots. The main origin of the Turkish Cypriots that settled in the town is the village of Alaminos, but inhabitants of many other villages were also relocated here. There are some Turkish people that have settled in the town as well, mostly hailing from the Mersin Province.

== Culture, sports and tourism ==
Prior to the Turkish invasion of Cyprus, Kythrea was the home of the football club AEK Kythreas. Değirmenlik Environment and Publicity Association was founded in 2008. Değirmenlik Association of Culture and Arts is a non-governmental organization that is active in the town, and it annually organizes the Festival of Culture and Arts since 2009. The members of the association participate in festivals abroad. The Municipality of Değirmenlik has a folklore group that is open to children.

Değirmenlik Sports Club was founded in 1975, and now in Cyprus Turkish Football Association (CTFA) K-PET 1st League. Kythrea's Sadik Cemil Football Stadium has "FIFA Recommended Star 2"-standard.

The town is home to Değirmenlik High School.

== International relations ==
=== Twin towns – sister cities ===
Kythrea is twinned with:

- Gebze, Kocaeli, Turkey (since 1996)
- Canik, Samsun, Turkey (since 2015)
