= St Mary's Church, Tyneham =

Church in Dorset, England

St Mary's Church
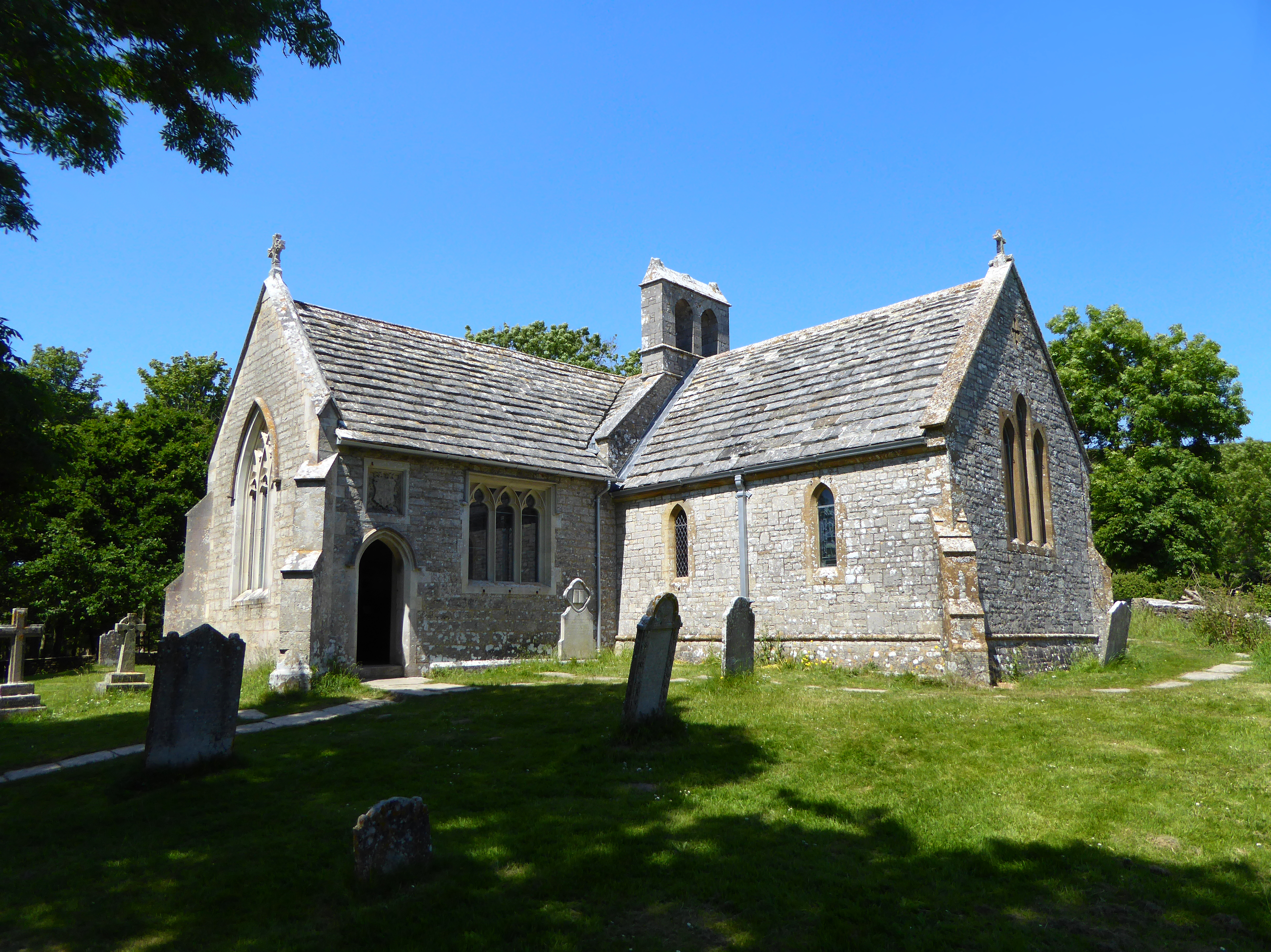

Religion
- Affiliation: Church of England
- Ecclesiastical or organisational status: Active

Location
- Location: Tyneham, Dorset, England
- Interactive map of St Mary's Church
- Coordinates: 50.6231°N 2.1690°W

Architecture
- Type: Church

St Mary's Church is a former Church of England parish church in Tyneham, Dorset, England. The church, which is a Grade II listed building, has 13th-century origins, with later additions, alterations and restorations. It is now under the care of the Ministry of Defence and is used as a museum and monument.

== History ==
St Mary's has its origins in the late 13th-century, with parts of the nave and north transept dating to this period. The nave and north transept both underwent restoration in 1744, which included rebuilding the west wall of the nave. During the early 19th-century, the chancel and north transept arches were rebuilt and enlarged. In 1832, a new south transept was built to the designs of Benjamin Ferrey for the rector, Rev. William Bond, for the sole use of the Bond family of Tyneham House. The same period saw the south wall of the nave rebuilt, and in the 1870s, the chancel was rebuilt to the designs of George R. Crickmay. In c. 1880, the south porch was moved to its current position on the west side of the church.

The church received a new organ in 1902, built by Burton of Winchester. It was presented by William H. Bond as a thanks offering after his son, Lieutenant Algernon Bond, recovered from wounds he received serving at the Siege of Ladysmith.

=== Military requisition ===
In December 1943, Tyneham was requisitioned by the War Office as part of a 7,500 acre expansion of their Lulworth Ranges associated with the Armoured Fighting Vehicles Gunnery School at Lulworth Camp. With the requisition, some of the church's furnishings were relocated for safekeeping. The two bells, reredos and organ were relocated to St Michael and All Angels at nearby Steeple, and the pulpit was sent to Lulworth Camp. Although the requisition was originally to be temporary, Tyneham was compulsorily purchased by the War Office in 1948.

While the War Office agreed with the Church of England and local authorities that the church should be spared damage from gunnery practice, they could not guarantee the building would not suffer from accidental hits. The church site was designated a safety area, although by May 1950, the church was reported to have been hit twice, with some shells going through its roof.

=== Restoration and current use as a museum and monument ===
Many of the village's buildings, including notable examples such as Tyneham House, had become ruins by the 1970s. Meanwhile, the church remained without major damage; its windows were boarded up but the Army continued to maintain the interior. When Tyneham started to be opened to the public on weekends and public holidays from 1975, the Army revealed their intention to use the church as a museum and visitor information centre. In October 1979, the church held its first service since 1943.

After the school's restoration was completed in 1994, the Ministry of Defence carried out repairs on St Mary's, with the work being completed by 2003. In December 2003, the church held a 60th anniversary carol service, and a service of remembrance was held in November 2012.

The church now serves as a museum and monument, with exhibitions on Tyneham's history. The building is open to the public during Tyneham's open days. St Mary's is still owned by the Diocese of Salisbury, but is rented to the Ministry of Defence for £1 a year.

== Architecture ==
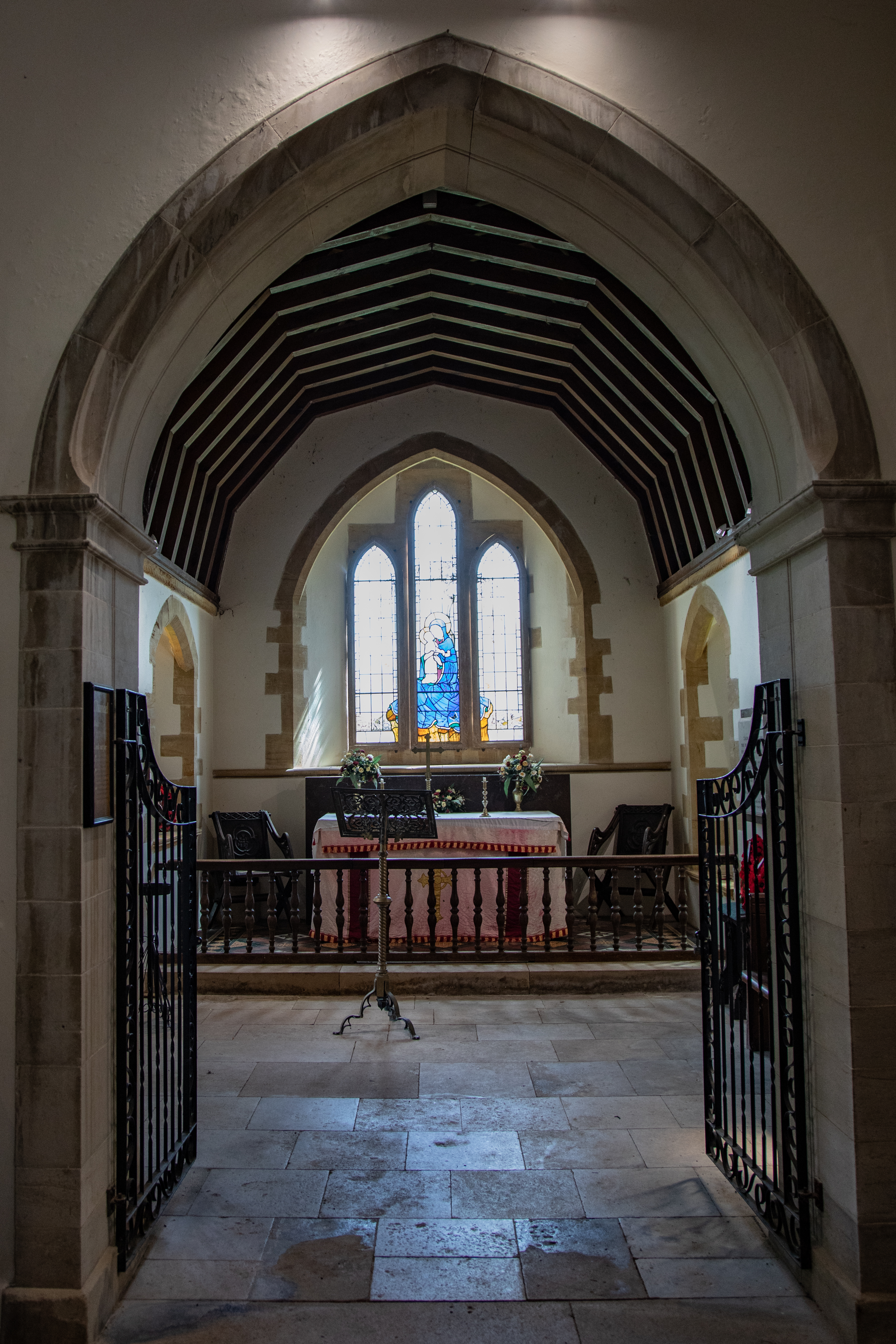
The chancel of St Mary's Church.

St Mary's is built of coursed, cut and squared limestone and limestone rubble, with ashlar dressings and slate/stone slate roofs. It has a cruciform plan and is made up of a nave, chancel, north and south transepts, and a west porch. The roof between the nave and chancel has a bell-cot for two bells. The north transept's east wall has a piscina dating to around 1300. The west end of the nave has an 18th-century gallery with an oak-panelled front and a wood panel featuring a quotation from Psalm XCVI. Fittings include fixed wooden pews, a wooden pulpit of 17th-century origin (returned from Lulworth Camp) and a hexagonal stone font with a carved wooden cover. The church had two bells, now removed, one being cast in Salisbury and dating to c. 1500, and the other cast by R. Wells of Aldbourne in 1784.

The church contains various memorials to the Bond family. On the north wall of the north transept is a wall-monument with tablet of 1641 in memory of John Williams (died 1627) and his wife Jane (died 1636). It was erected by their grandson John Williams in 1641. On the north wall of the nave is a black marble tablet to Elizabeth Tarrant, dated 1769. The chancel has a World War I memorial marble plaque with the names of six men, which was added in 1920. The walls of the nave and transepts contain the names of villagers forced to vacate the village in 1943, which were added during the late 20th-century restoration by Swanage-based artist Lynda Price. Some of the church's stained glass windows are early 20th-century and were made by Powell & Sons (Whitefriars) Ltd. The chancel's east window by Martin Travers is dated 1924.

== Listed status ==
St Mary's was designated a Grade II listed building by Historic England in December 2020. They described the church as a "prominent and well-preserved building" and one which serves as a "poignant reminder of the huge impact of the Second World War on this small rural community". The church's architectural interest was highlighted, including the "extent of surviving medieval fabric" and the "well-considered design and good-quality craftsmanship" of the south transept, as well as the church's association with architects Benjamin Ferrey and George R. Crickmay.
