= Tyneham =

Abandoned village in Dorset, England

Coordinates: 50.623°N 2.169°W

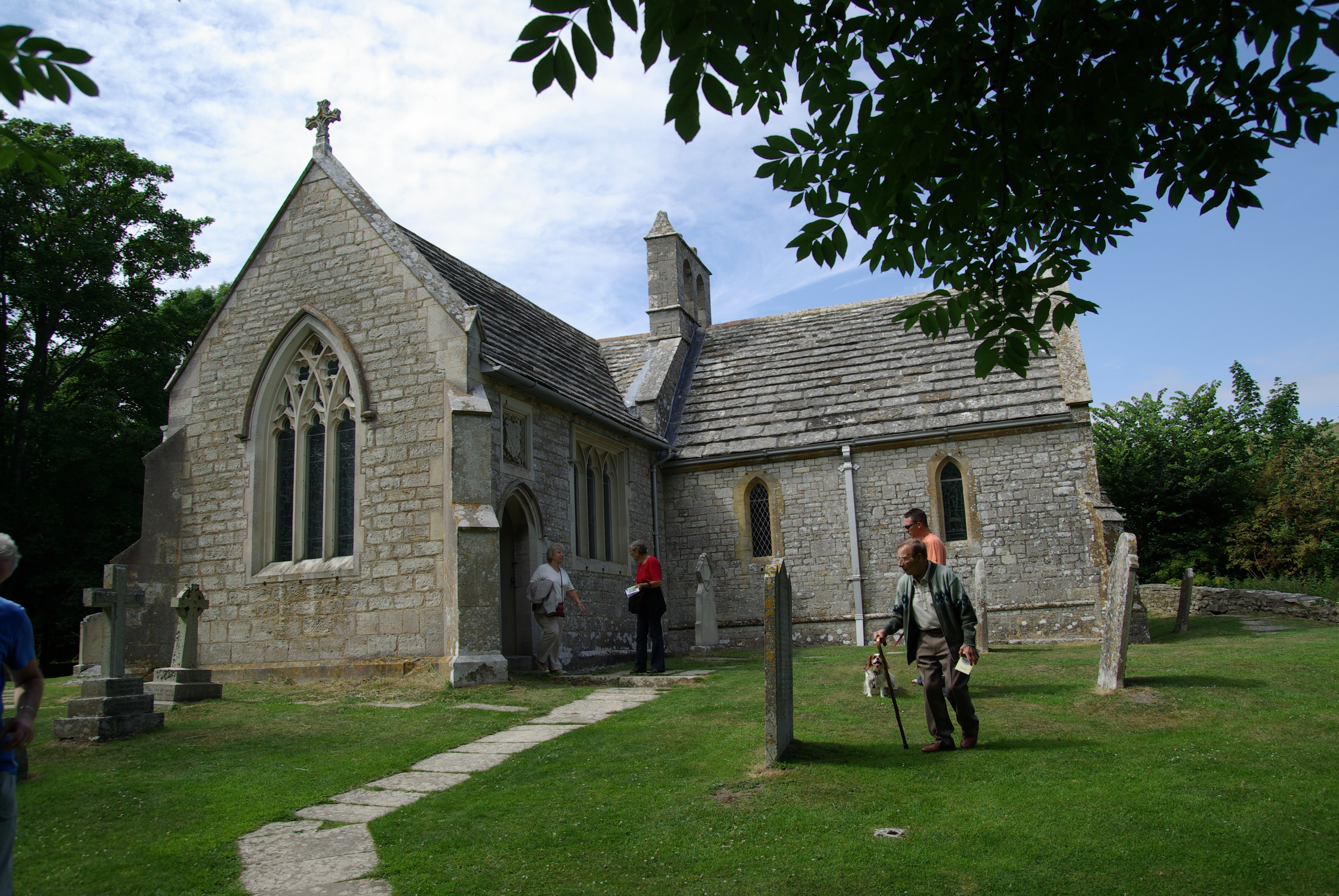
- Tyneham St Mary's Church in 2009

- Location within Dorset
- Population: 0 (2001 Census)
- OS grid reference: SY885805
- Civil parish: Steeple with Tyneham
- Unitary authority: Dorset
- Ceremonial county: Dorset
- Region: South West
- Country: England
- Sovereign state: United Kingdom
- Post town: WAREHAM
- Postcode district: BH20
- Police: Dorset
- Fire: Dorset and Wiltshire
- Ambulance: South Western
- UK Parliament: South Dorset

Tyneham is a ghost village abandoned in 1943 and former civil parish, now in the parish of Steeple with Tyneham, in the Dorset district, in the south of Dorset, England, near Lulworth on the Isle of Purbeck. In 2001, the civil parish had a population of 0. The civil parish was abolished on 1 April 2014 and merged with Steeple to form Steeple with Tyneham.

== Location ==
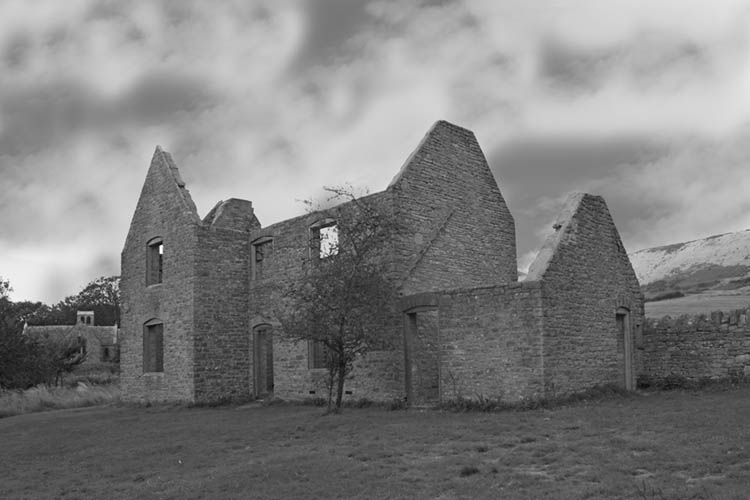
Gardener's House

The village is situated northeast of Worbarrow Bay on the Jurassic Coast, about 3.7 miles (6.0 km) south of Wareham and about 9.9 miles (15.9 km) west of Swanage. The village lies in a secluded east–west valley between two ridges of the Purbeck Hills. To the north is the main ridge with Povington Hill (191 m; 627 ft) and its highest point, Ridgeway Hill (199 m; 653 ft). To the south is the ridge above Gad Cliff that runs from the headland of Worbarrow Tout in the west to the knoll of Tyneham Cap (167 m; 548 ft) in the east.

== Access ==
Tyneham is only accessible when the Lulworth Ranges are open to the public. The military firing ranges are owned by the Ministry of Defence (MoD) and are part of the Armoured Fighting Vehicles Gunnery School. Safety warnings about explosives and unexploded shells are posted at Mupe Bay by the MoD: visitors are advised to keep to official footpaths and observe local site notices because tanks and armoured vehicles are used in this area.

== History ==
The parish includes evidence of occupation dating back to Iron Age Britain; there are more than 30 barrows in the area, although most have been damaged by shelling. Proof of Roman occupation has also been found in the valley around Tyneham and there were salt-boiling, shale-turning and Purbeck Marble industries at Worbarrow Bay. South of the chalk ridge are remains of a medieval settlement and strip fields.

It seems that it was once the possession of Robert, Count of Mortain, the half-brother of William I of England. The village is mentioned in the Domesday Book of 1086 as Tigeham, meaning "goat enclosure". A century later, the village was known as Tiham and only in later times as Tyneham. The limestone church of St Mary dates from at least the 15th century, and Tyneham House was built by Henry Williams between 1563 and 1583.

In 1683, Nathaniel Bond (1634–1707) of Lutton acquired Tyneham from the Williams family. He also bought Creech Grange in 1691 and the family still hold their Purbeck estates. Tyneham school was established by the Reverend Nathaniel Bond (1804–89) in 1860. It was later declared as property of the rectory and was closed in 1932 due to lack of pupils.

The village and 7,500 acres (30 km^{2}) of surrounding heathland and chalk downland around the Purbeck Hills were requisitioned just before Christmas 1943 by the then War Office (now MoD) for use as firing ranges for training troops. 225 people were displaced, the last person leaving a notice on the church door:

Please treat the church and houses with care; we have given up our homes where many of us lived for generations to help win the war to keep men free. We shall return one day and thank you for treating the village kindly.

This measure was supposed to be temporary for the duration of World War II, but in 1948 the Army placed a compulsory purchase order on the land and it has remained in use for military training ever since. Although littered with scrap used as targets and subject to regular shelling, the land has become a haven for wildlife as it has been free from farming and development. In 1975, after complaints from tourists and locals, the Ministry of Defence began opening the village and footpaths across the ranges at weekends and throughout August.

Many of the village buildings have fallen into disrepair or have been damaged by shelling. In 1967, most of the manor house, with parts that dated back to the 14th century, was pulled down by the then Ministry of Works. The building's east front was reconstructed at Athelhampton, with smaller parts moved to Melcombe Horsey and Bingham's Melcombe. The church of St Mary, however, remains largely intact; it has a stained-glass window by Martin Travers and memorials to the Bond family, but the 17th-century pulpit was moved to Lulworth Camp and the plate to Kimmeridge. The church and school house have since been preserved as museums. The church, school and drinking fountain are all grade II listed buildings. In 2008, Tyneham Farm was reopened to the public and conservation work there is ongoing.

The last surviving resident of Tyneham, Peter Wellman, died aged 100 in May 2025 in Swanage. In 2024 he made a final visit to village to see the house where he was born and the school he had attended.

== In popular culture ==
In 1985, the village was used for the filming of Comrades, which depicts the story of the Tolpuddle Martyrs. The church had a fibreglass tower and large additional gravestones and Post Office Row was fronted with fibreglass cottages. During the filming Tyneham's original 1929 K1 Mark 236 telephone kiosk was destroyed and the film company sourced a replacement.

The village is the setting for the climax to the comic-thriller Angel's Share by Mike Ripley (2006).

Tyneham is featured in episode 5 of the first season of Life After People, "The Invaders", in which its existence as a settlement suddenly abandoned by its residents is examined.

The village of "Tyneford" of Natasha Solomons' novel The House at Tyneford (also known as The Novel in the Viola) is directly based on Tyneham, and its history during World War II.

The village is the setting for the novel The Forgotten Village by Lorna Cook (2019).

The history of the village is the premise for the novel This Ruined Place (originally published for young adults as Juby's Rook) by Michael Lawrence (2023).

The historical fiction novel The Rose Arbor by Rhys Bowen (2024) is set in the fictional village of Tydeham, based on the actual village of Tyneham and the circumstances of its decline after the military occupation during World War II.

== Gallery ==
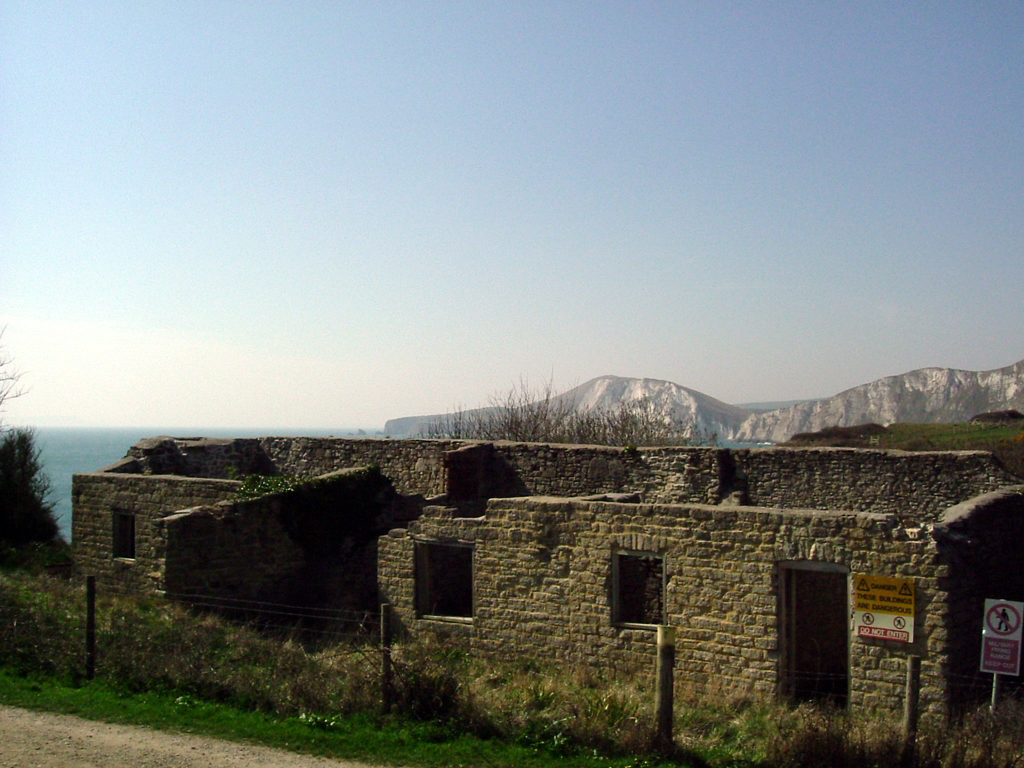
Worbarrow Bay and Mupe Rocks behind a ruined house

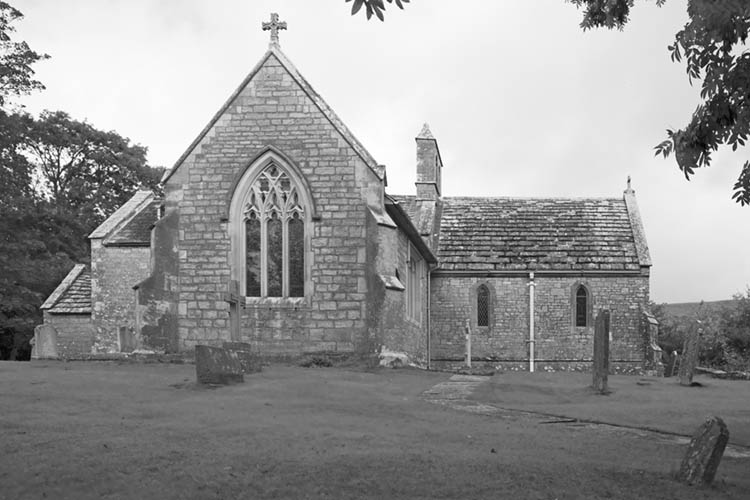
Tyneham St Mary's Church - south transept

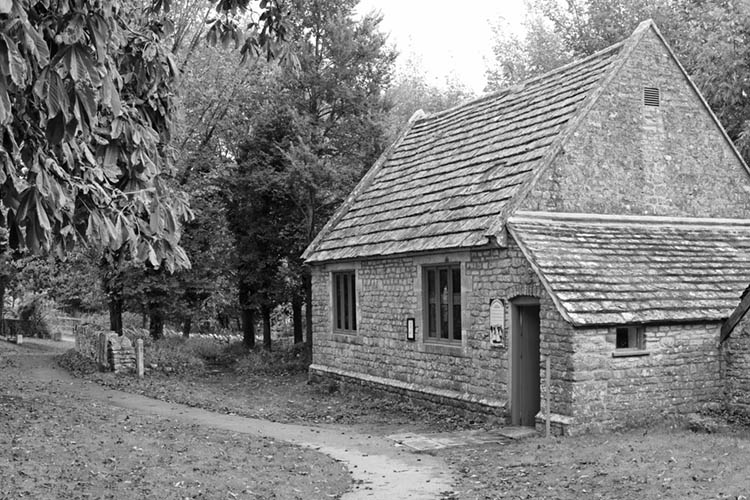
Tyneham School House

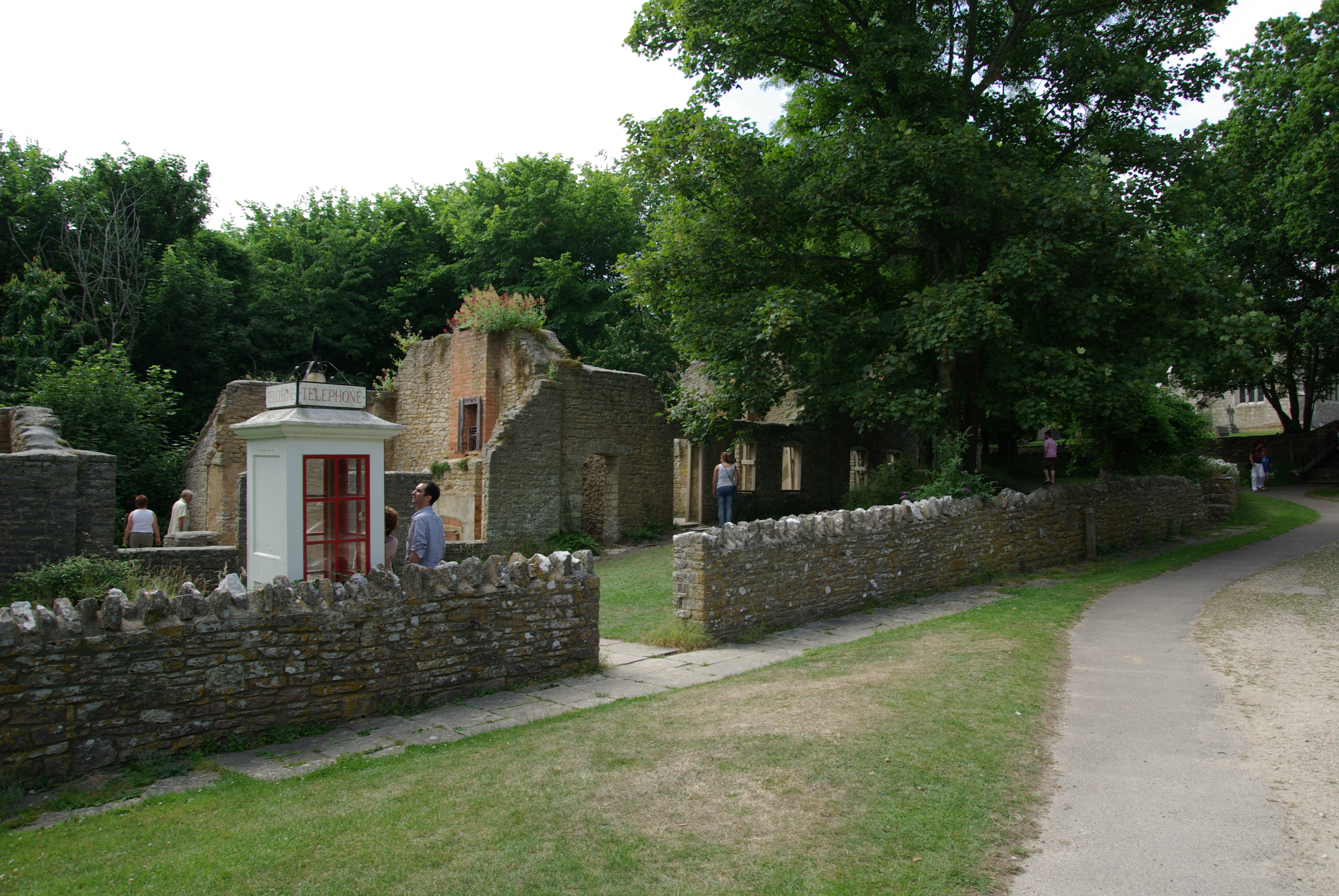
Tyneham houses - the shepherd's house, Post Office and telephone box

== See also ==
- Imber, in Wiltshire on the Salisbury Plain, is another village which was taken over for military purposes.
- The Stanford Battle Area, in Norfolk, contains six villages also taken over for military purposes.
- Povington Priory
- List of lost settlements in the United Kingdom
