= List of commando units =

This is a list of current commando units.

== Argentina ==
- 601 Commando Company
- 602 Commando Company
- 603 Commando Company
- Amphibious Commandos Group, belonging to the Marine Corps.

== Australia ==
- 1st Commando Regiment
- 2nd Commando Regiment

== Azerbaijan ==
- Azerbaijani Commando Brigades

== Bangladesh ==
- Para-Commando Brigade

== Belgium ==
- 2nd Commando Battalion

== Brazil ==
- 1º Batalhão de Ações de Comandos
- COMANF
- Esquadrão Aeroterrestre de Salvamento

== China - PRC ==
- People's Liberation Army Air Force Airborne Corps Special Forces Brigade (Thunder Gods special forces unit) - the PLAAF Airborne Corps special forces
- 7th Marine Brigade "Jiaolong Commandos" - the PLANMC's special forces

== Colombia ==
=== Air Force ===
- Special Air Command Group (Agrupación de Comandos Especiales Aéreos)

== France ==
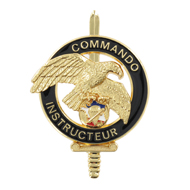
3rd level Commando Badge

In France, commando is both the name of Special Operations or Special Operations Capable units and the name of an elite light infantry training.

- French Army (Armée de Terre)

The commandos are trained at the Centre national d'entraînement commando or National Commando Training Center. The graduates of the Center are either serving in a SF unit (1er RPIMa and 13e RDP), in a light-infantry unit (Commando Parachute Group in the 11th Parachute Brigade and Mountain Commando Group in the 27th Mountain Infantry Brigade) or as instructors in a regular Army unit. Furthermore, members of the counter-terrorist National Gendarmerie Intervention Group and of the Division Action of Directorate-General for External Security are usually graduates of the Center.

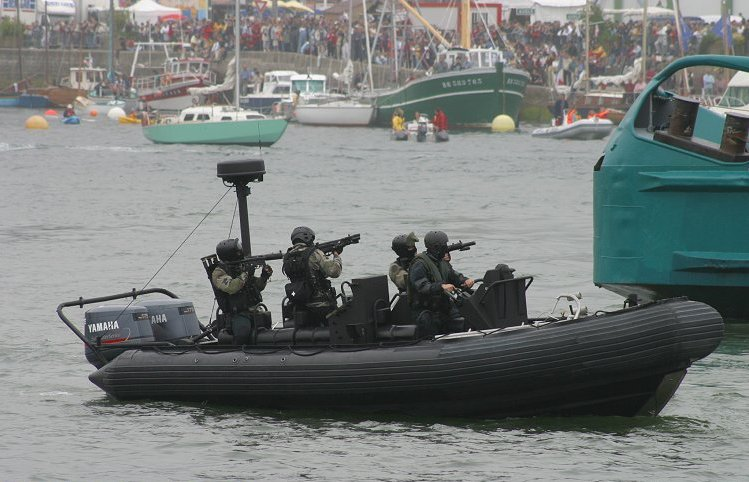
Weapons of the modern commando Jaubert are clearly visible

- French Navy (Marine Nationale)

The Commandos Marine are the Navy component of Special Operations Command.
- Commando Hubert : (also named Commando d'Action Sous-Marine Hubert, CASM, "underwater operations commando"): Submarine action (combat divers).
- Commando Jaubert : Assault at sea, exfiltration, close quarters battle at sea.
- Commando Trepel : Assault at sea, exfiltration.
- Commando de Penfentenyo : Reconnaissance, Intelligence Operations (recon swimmers)
- Commando de Montfort : Long range neutralisation (missile launchers, light mortars, heavy sniper rifles), fire support designation
- Commando Kieffer : C3I, military dogs

- French Air Force (Armée de L'Air).

The Parachute Commandos (commandos parachutistes) are the élite units of the Air Force Infantry (Fusiliers Commandos de l'Air).
- Commando parachutiste de l'Air n° 10 (CPA 10) is the Air Force component of Special Operations Command
- Commando parachutiste de l'Air n° 20 : long-range Bases Protection and JTACs.
- Commando parachutiste de l'Air n° 20 : RESCO

== Germany ==
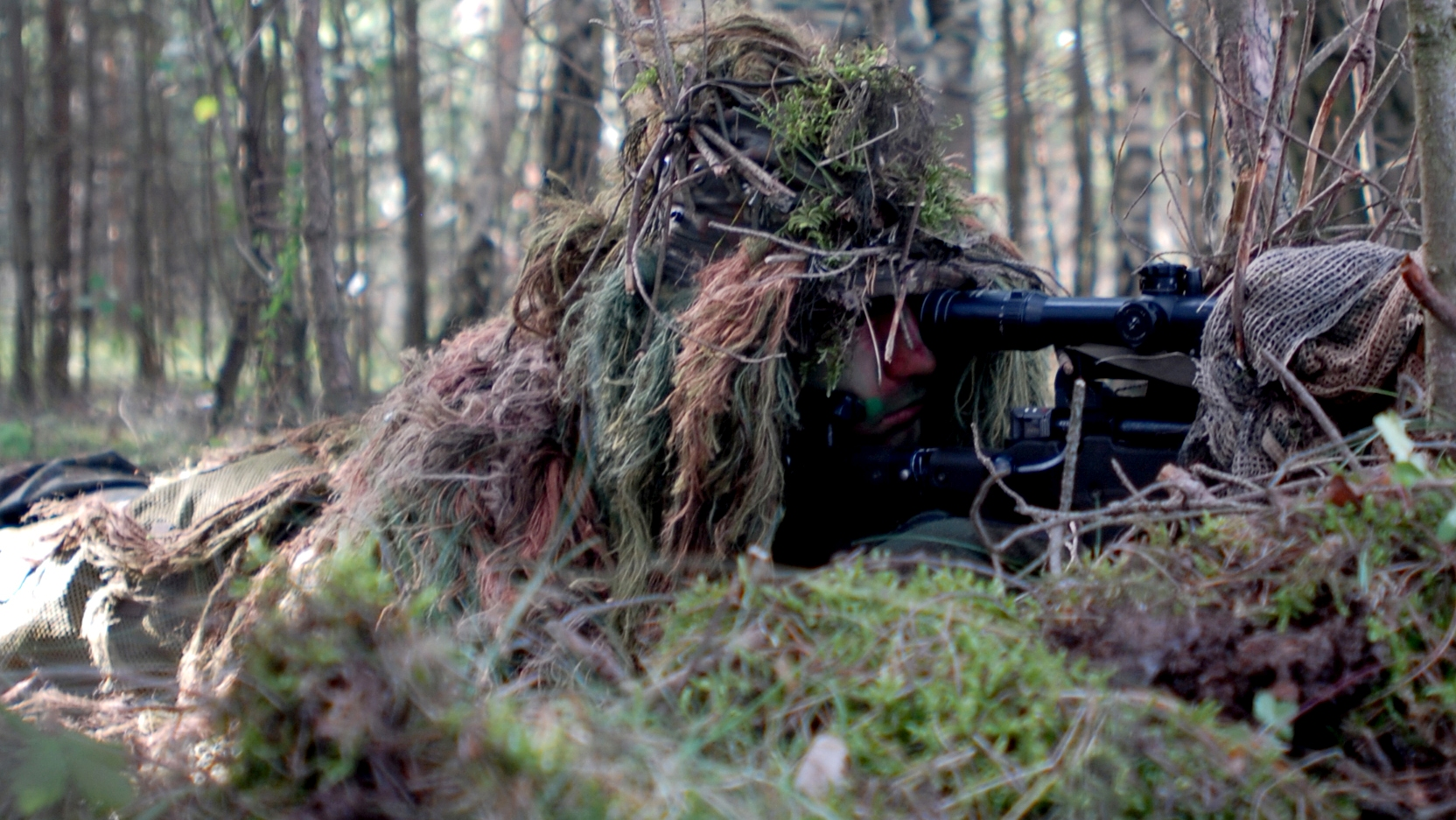
KSK-sniper during training

The German Army currently operates the Fernspähkompanie (Germany's elite long range reconnaissance company), and the Kommando Spezialkräfte (KSK).

The KSK is stationed in Calw, in the Black Forest area in southern Germany. It consists of about 1,100 soldiers, but only a nucleus of these are in fighting units. Exact numbers are not available, as this information is considered secret. The KSK is a part of the Special Operations Division (Div. Spezielle Operationen or DSO).

The fighting units are divided into four commando companies of about 100 men each and the special commando company with veteran members, taking supporting tasks. Each of the four commando companies has five specialised platoons:

- 1st platoon: land insertions
- 2nd platoon: airborne operations
- 3rd platoon: amphibious operations
- 4th platoon: operations in special geographic or meteorologic surroundings (e.g. mountains or polar-regions)
- 5th platoon: reconnaissance, sniper and counter-sniper operations
- Command Platoon

There are four commando squads in every platoon.

== India ==
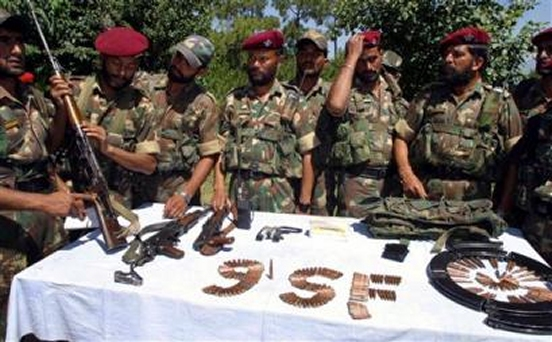
Para commandos in 2010

In India, the term "commando" is generally used to refer to the Special forces of India. 2 of the 3 Indian special forces currently have the word "commando" in their name while the other dropped the word "commando" for "Special Forces" in the late 1970s.

- Para (Special Forces) (Indian Army)
- MARCOS (Indian Navy)
- Garud Commando Force (Indian Air Force)
- Special Operations Command

In addition, Ghatak Platoons are platoons present in every single infantry battalion of the Indian Army consisting of the most physically capable troops from every battalion who are selected to undergo commando training and are better equipped than the other platoons present in the battalion. Their role is similar to that of light infantry commandos.

== Iraq ==
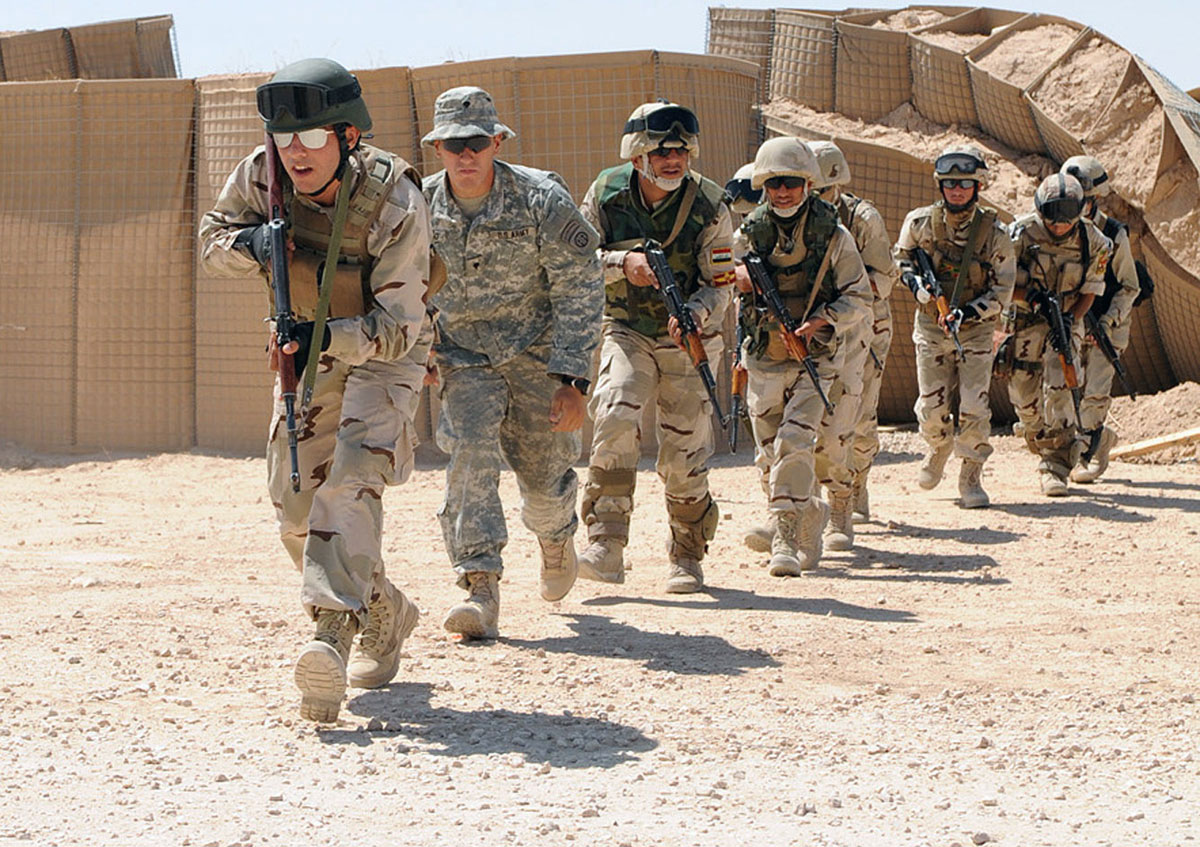
Iraqi commandos in June 2010, training under the supervision of soldiers from the 82nd Airborne

- Iraqi 36th Commando Battalion

== Israel ==
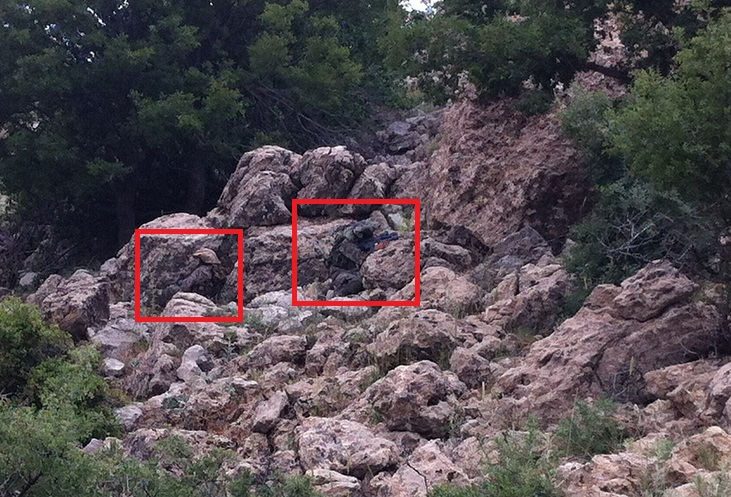
Israeli Egoz Reconnaissance soldiers blending in with the landscape

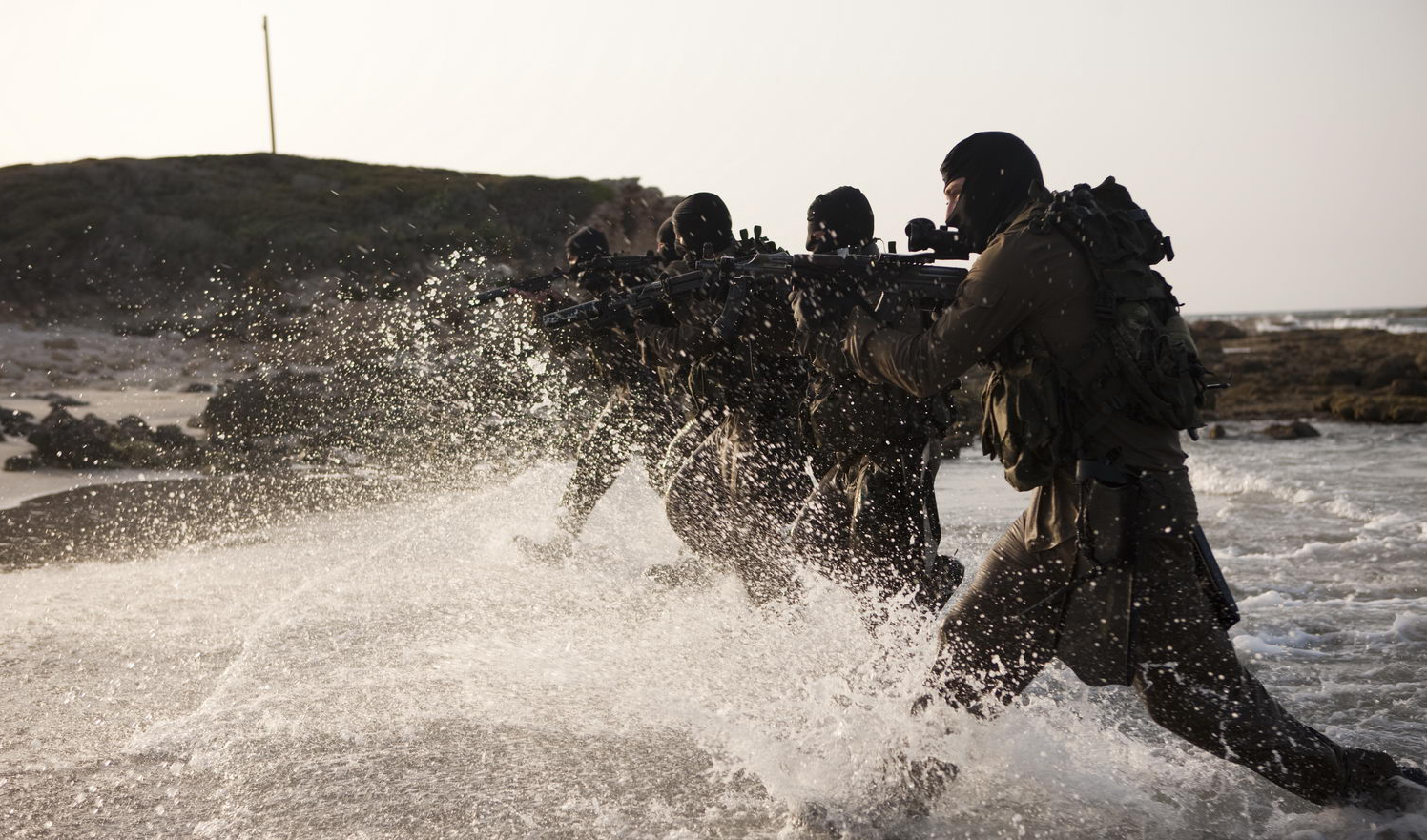
Israeli Shayetet 13 Operatives during training

The primary commando units of the Israel Defense Forces include Shayetet 13, Sayeret Matkal and the Shaldag Unit.

Shayetet 13 is the elite naval commando unit of the Israeli Navy. S'13 specializes in sea-to-land incursions, counter-terrorism, sabotage, maritime intelligence gathering, maritime hostage rescue, and boarding. The unit is one of the world's most well reputed special forces units.

Sayeret Matkal (General Staff Reconnaissance Unit) is a special forces unit of the Israel Defense Forces (IDF) directly subordinate to the Directorate of Military Intelligence.Primarily a field intelligence-gathering unit specializing in special reconnaissance behind enemy lines, Sayeret Matkal is also tasked with counter-terrorism, hostage rescue, and foreign espionage. Modeled after the British Army's Special Air Service—from which it emulated the motto, "Who Dares, Wins"—the unit is considered to be the Israeli equivalent to the famed Delta Force of the United States. As one of Israel's most important commando units, the Sayeret Matkal has reputedly been involved in almost every major counter-terrorism operation since its inception in 1957.

The Egoz Reconnaissance Unit is an Israeli Special Force commando unit, in the Israel Defense Forces (IDF). Egoz is a unit that specializes in guerrilla, anti-guerrilla warfare, behind enemy lines intelligence gathering, and more complicated ground activity. Egoz is part of the Commando Brigade but still completes basic training with the Golani Brigade.

Maglan (Also known as Unit 212) is an Israeli special forces unit which specializes in operating behind enemy lines and deep in enemy territory using advanced technologies and weaponry.

Unit 217, frequently called Duvdevan Unit is an elite special operations force within the Israel Defense Forces, part of the Oz Brigade. Duvdevan are noted for undercover operations in urban areas, during which they often wear Arab civilian clothes as a disguise. They are also known to be trained in human and mechanical counter-surveillance.

Shaldag Unit, also known as Unit 5101, is an elite Israeli Air Force commando unit. Shaldag's mission is to deploy undetected into combat and hostile environments to conduct special reconnaissance, establish assault zones or airfields, while simultaneously conducting air traffic control and commando actions.

== Korea, South - ROK ==
Republic of Korea Army

- 700th Commando Regiment
- 701st Commando Regiment
- 702nd Commando Regiment
- 703rd Commando Regiment
- 705th Commando Regiment

== Madagascar ==
Malagasy Army

- Special Intervention Forces Group (Groupement des forces spéciales d’intervention, GFSI)

== Malaysia ==
In Malaysia, the concept of commandos has its roots in the Special Operations Executive's (SOE) Far East branch, known as Force 136, during World War II. Many of its agents received commando training at British commando schools located in Europe, Asia, or Australia. After the war, a number of these former operatives continued to serve in the Malaysian Armed Forces. As a result, the term "Commando" in Malaysia generally refers to special forces personnel who have mastered espionage, guerrilla warfare and jungle operations.

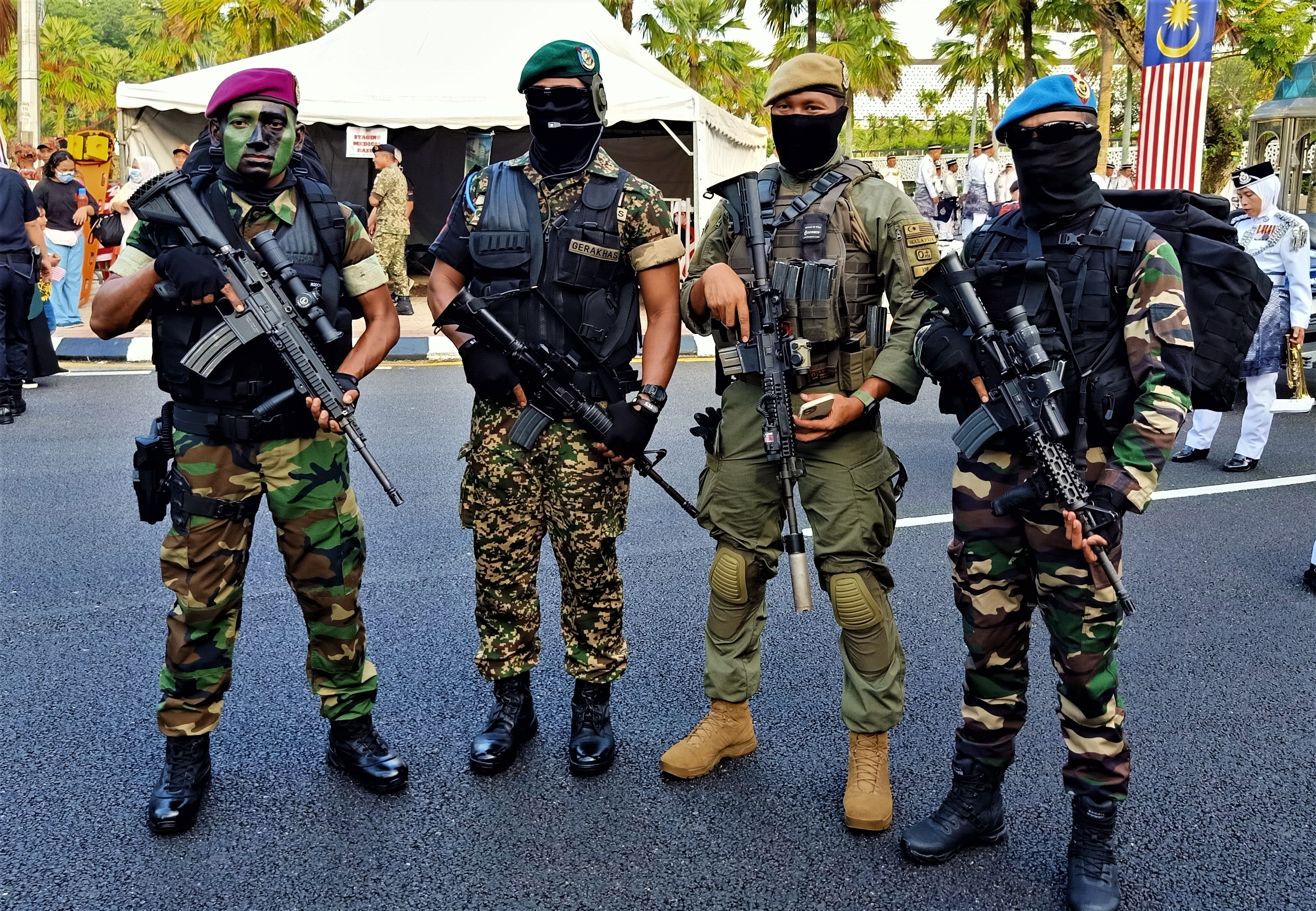
Commandos from different units pose for photograph during Malaysia Day 2022.

Today, nearly all Malaysian special forces units, except those that focus specifically on urban operations, are required to complete a basic commando course at the commando school as part of their selection process. Historically, there were four units that included the word "Commando" in their official names. However, one of these units has since removed the term and adopted a different designation.

The units currently bearing the "Commando" title are:

- 69 Commando – a special forces unit of the Royal Malaysia Police
- 21st Commando Regiment – a special forces unit of the Malaysian Army
- 22nd Commando Regiment – a special forces unit of the Malaysian Army

The Royal Malaysian Navy's special forces, known today as the Naval Special Forces (PASKAL), previously used the name "Naval Commando Unit" from 1977 until 1982.

== Netherlands ==
- Korps Commando Troepen

== Pakistan ==
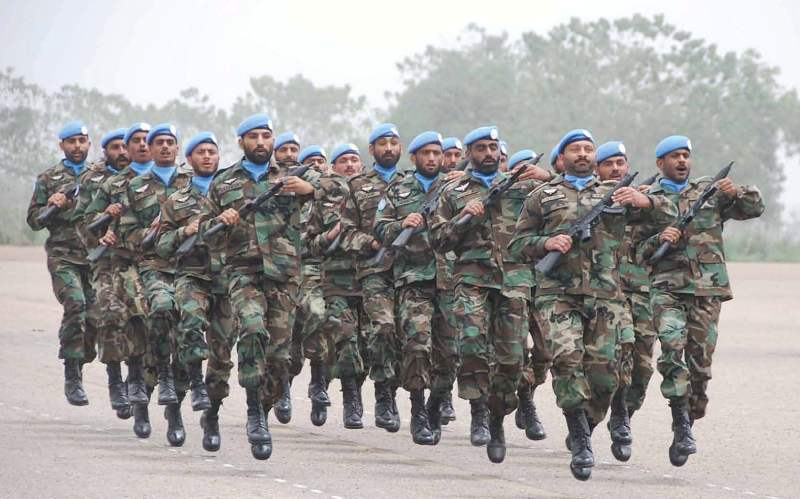
Pakistani SSG Commandos on UN Peacekeeping Force

- Light Commando Battalions have been formed by the Pakistan Army for special operations and counter-terrorism.

== Philippines ==
Seal of the Special Action Force

The Special Action Force (SAF) is the elite commando unit of the Philippine National Police. It is required to undergo the SAF Commando Course to be allowed to wear the SAF Beret. It also serves as the foundation course or requisite for other SAF specialization trainings such as Explosives and Ordnance Disposal (EOD), Basic Airborne Course (BAC), Urban Counter Revolutionary Warfare Course (SURESHOCK), SCUBA-BUSROC (Basic Under-Water Search and Rescue Operations Course), SAF Seaborne Warfare Course (SSWC) and others.

== Portugal ==
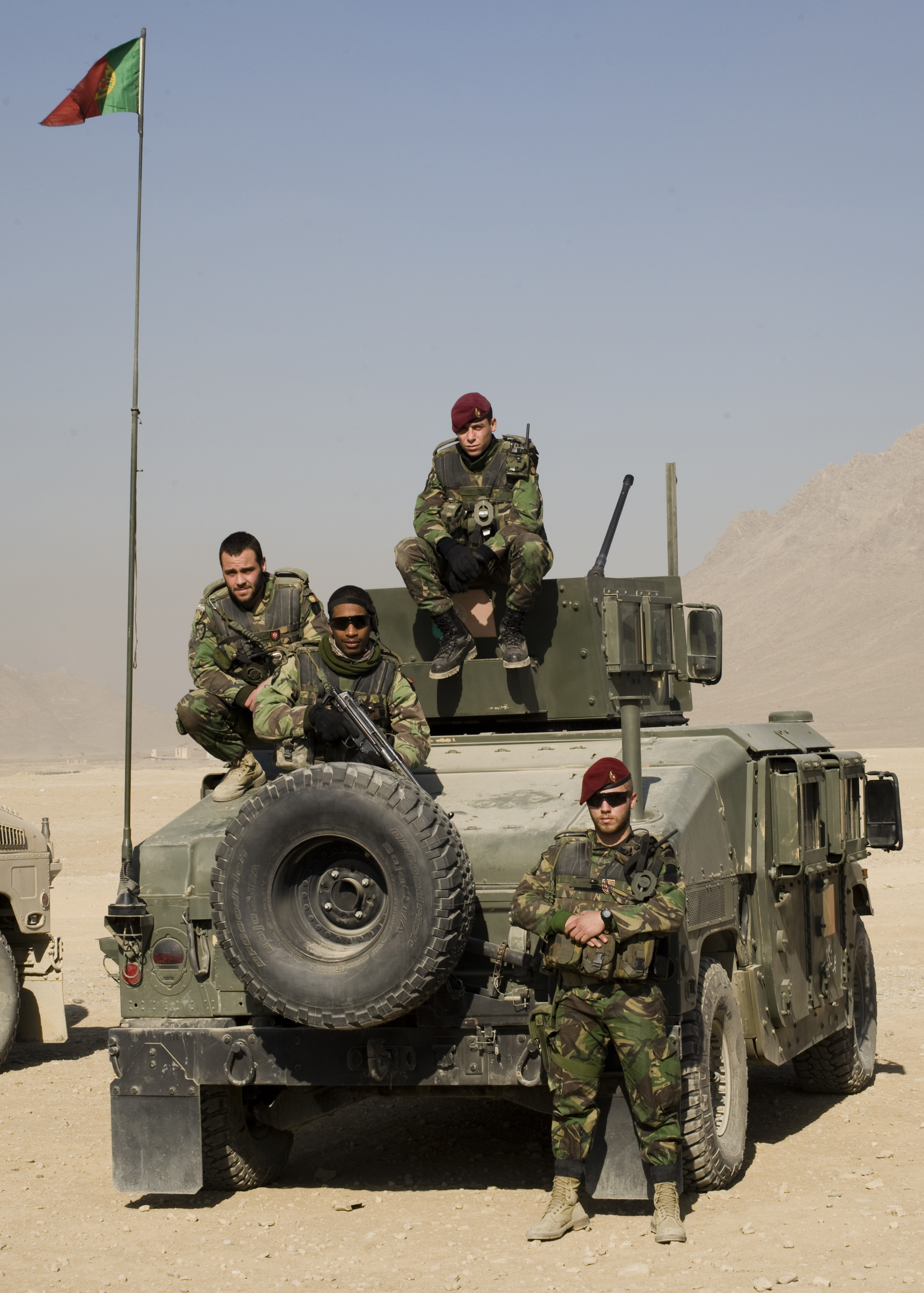
A Portuguese Army Commandos team in Afghanistan

- Comandos Troops

== Singapore ==
Singapore Armed Forces Commando Formation 1 CDO, 1st Commando Battalion

== Sri Lanka ==
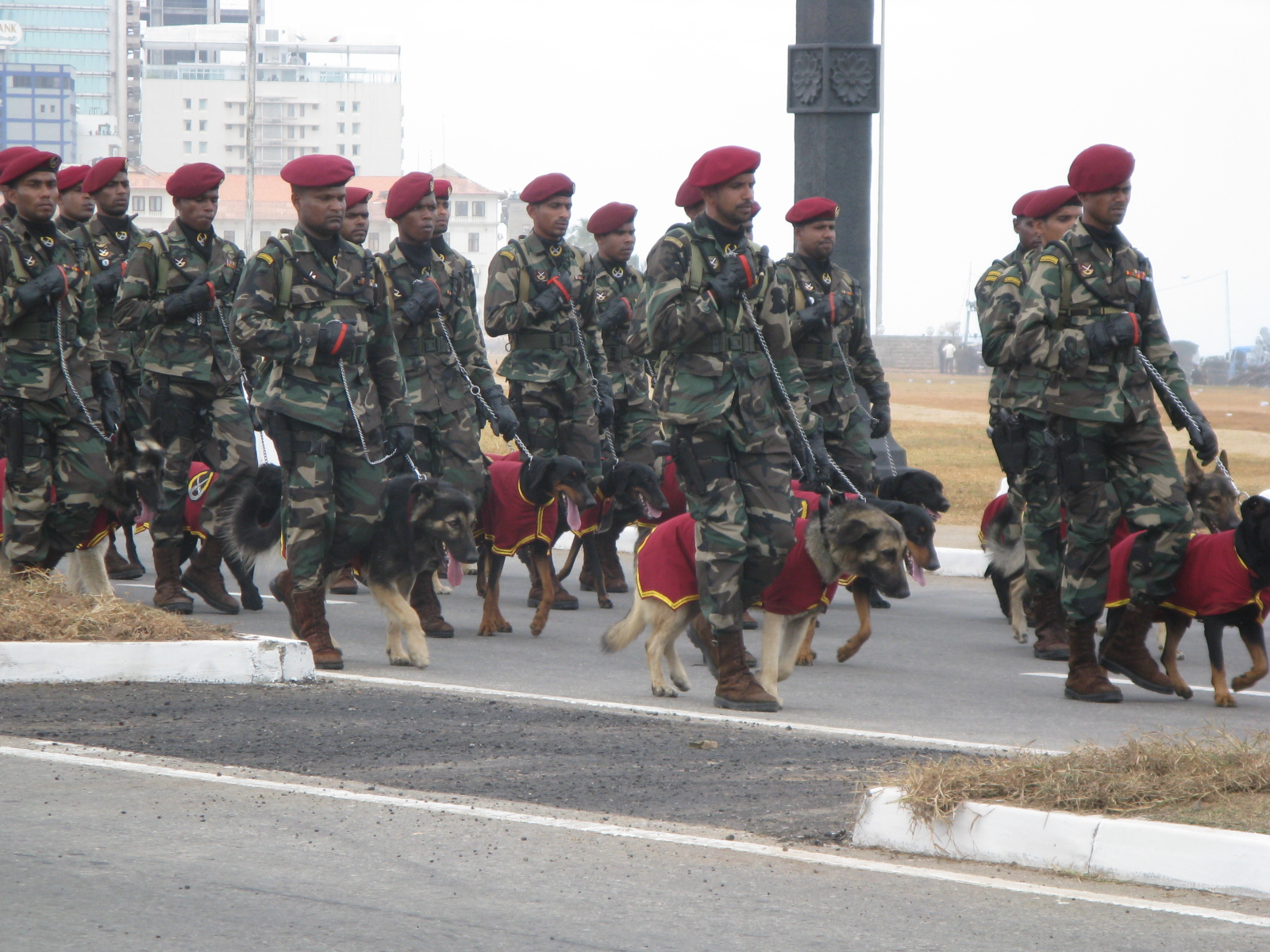
Sri Lanka Army Commando K9 Unit

Sri Lanka Army Commando Regiment

- 1st Commando Regiment
- 2nd Commando Regiment
- 3rd Commando Regiment
- 4th Commando Regiment
- HQ BN Commando(RFT)
- Commando Regiment Training School Uva Kudaoya
- Commando Regiment Specialized Warfare Training School at Vidathalathive Mannar
- Anti Hijacking & Hostage Release Team' (AHHRT)

== South Africa ==
While the use of the word commando came to refer to various elite special operations forces units in other countries in the world, South Africa retained its original name as both a well regulated quick response militia as well as a special operations forces unit defined in the worldwide fashion. From the end of the 19th until the early 21st centuries, the Commando units in the form of its original structure were used in both urban and rural areas until the end of white rule in South Africa as part of a nationwide South African Commando System.

When white rule was replaced with majority rule, the new democratic ANC led government demanded the disbandment of the commandos which they considered an obstacle to further democratic control as well as complaints of abuses. Thus, with the integration of white cities with black townships, the new ANC led urban governments immediately disbanded the urban militia commando units.

With the election of Thabo Mbeki, the process of de-arming white militias again commenced and it was announced in 2003, that the rural commandos would be disbanded. The last rural commandos were ordered disbanded by the central government over constitutional arguments.

The ANC government directed its attention toward the Reconnaissance Commandos which were the first mixed-race unit in the old SADF. During the period of rationalisation, reorganisation and integration, some Reconnaissance Regiments (Numbers 1, 2, 3, 5 and 6) were disbanded and the members absorbed into the remaining 4 Special Forces Regiment (SFR) at Langebaan and 5 SFR at Phalaborwa as part of the South African Special Forces Brigade.

== Sweden ==
- Coastal rangers, marine commando (Kustjägarna, KJ)

== Syria ==
- Republican Guard
  - 102nd Commando Brigade
  - 103rd Commando Brigade
  - 104th Commando Brigade
- 5th Mechanized Division
  - 59th Commando Battalion

== Thailand ==
Air Force

- Royal Thai Air Force Security Force Regiment
  - Royal Thai Air Force Special Operations Regiment also known as Air Force Commando

== Turkey ==
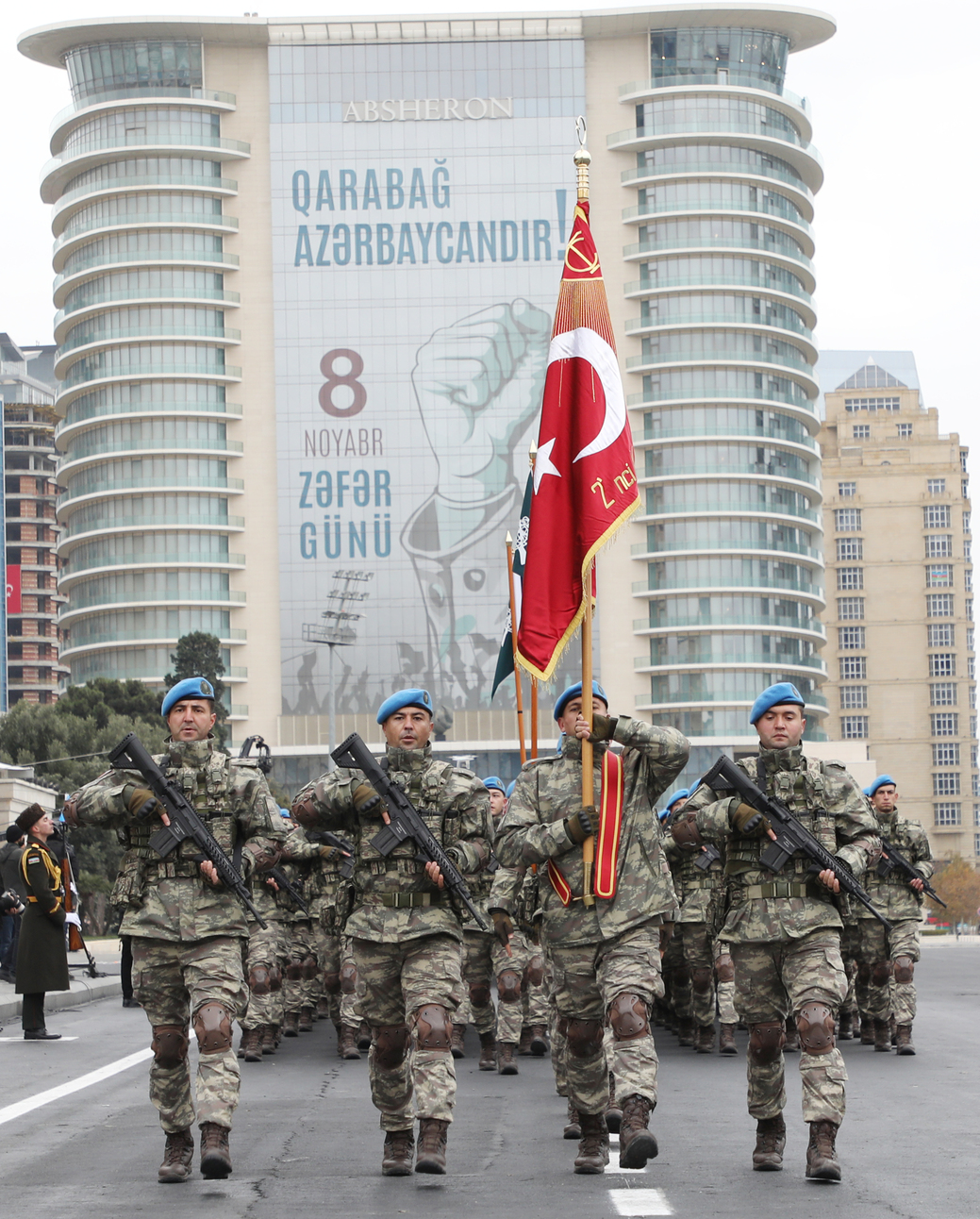
Servicemen of the 2nd Cmnd. Brg.

Turkish commandos typically wear blue berets. Commando brigades form the backbone of the Turkish Army's offensive capabilities, but they are not trained to conduct special operations, rather they serve as the main light infantry of the TAF. As of 2016, the number of commando brigades have been expanded to 16 to deal with the new threats, including two in the gendarmerie force brigade. These include:

- 1st Airborne Commando Brigade
- 2nd Commando Brigade
- 3rd Commando Brigade
- 4th Commando Brigade
- 5th Mountain and Commando Brigade
- 7th Commando Brigade
- 9th Commando Brigade
- 10th Commando Brigade
- 11th Commando Brigade
- 17th Commando Brigade
- 40th Commando Brigade
- 41st Commando Brigade
- 49th Commando Brigade
- 52nd Commando Brigade
- Amphibious Commando Brigade - specialized in amphibious warfare and amphibious reconnaissance
- 1st Gendarmerie Commando Brigade
- 2nd Gendarmerie Commando Brigade

The most notable are the 1st Commando Brigade and the 5th Hakkari Mountain and Commando Brigade. The Hakkari Mountain and Commando Brigade was founded as a subunit of the 1st Commando Brigade and is stationed in Hakkâri Province at south-easternmost Turkey. With the rise of the Kurdish insurgency, the existing formation has been enlarged from the size of a battalion to a brigade. The 1st Commando Brigade was involved in the Turkish invasion of Cyprus, and fought beside airborne commandos (Bolu) and the Naval Infantry Brigade (Izmir). In 1988, 7000 commandos received training from the United States.

== United Kingdom ==
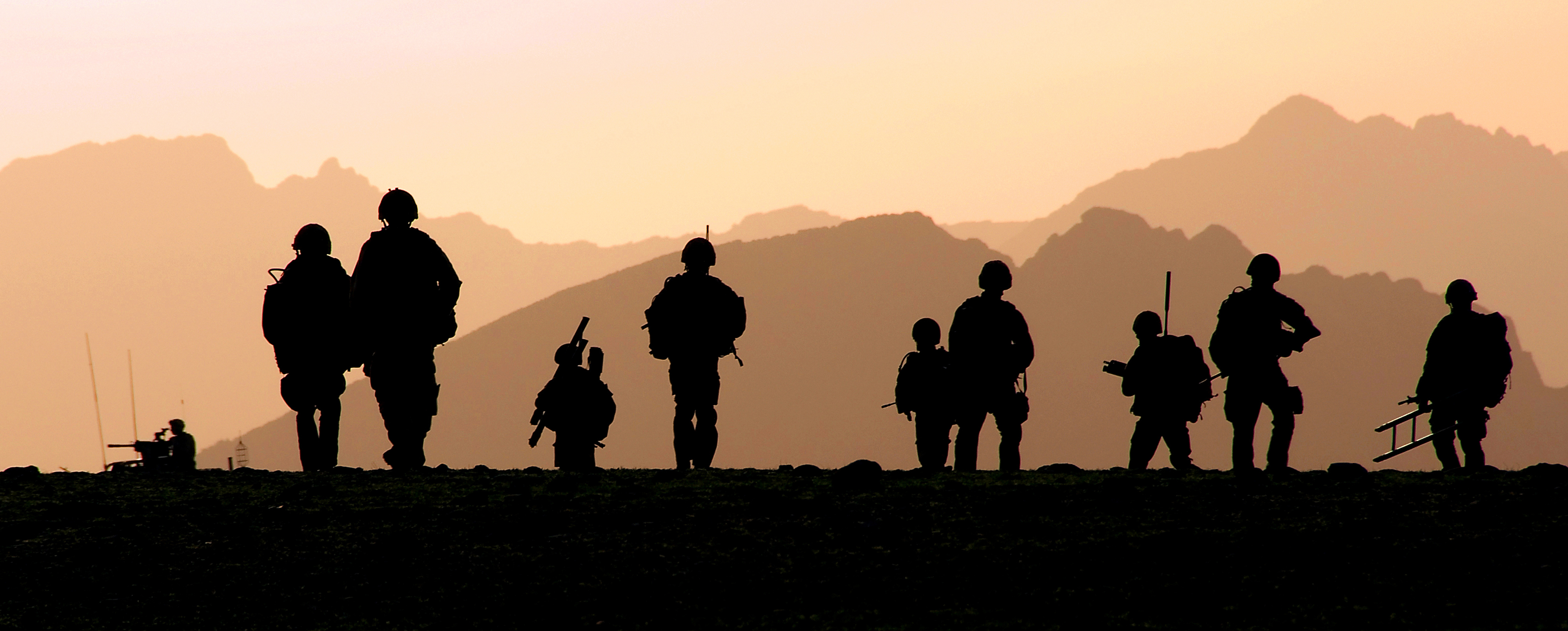
45 Commando Royal Marines in Afghanistan

UK Commando Force, Royal Marines is under the command of the Royal Navy's Commander-in-Chief Fleet. All Royal Marines (other than those in the Royal Marines Band Service) are commando trained on entry to the Corps, with supporting units and individuals from the other armed services undertaking the All Arms Commando Course as required.

The UKCF is made up of 30 (IX) Commando (RM Stonehouse), 40 Commando (home base: RM Norton Manor), 42 Commando (RM Bickleigh, Plymouth), 43 Commando Fleet Protection Group (HMNB Clyde, Argyll and Bute), 45 Commando (RM Condor, Scotland), the Commando Logistic Regiment (RM Chivenor), the Viking Squadron (Bovington Camp (Royal Armoured Corps Centre), Dorset), 539 Assault Squadron RM, 29 Commando Regiment Royal Artillery and 24 Commando Regiment Royal Engineers.

The Royal Marines is the largest force of its type in Europe and the second largest in NATO.

== United States ==
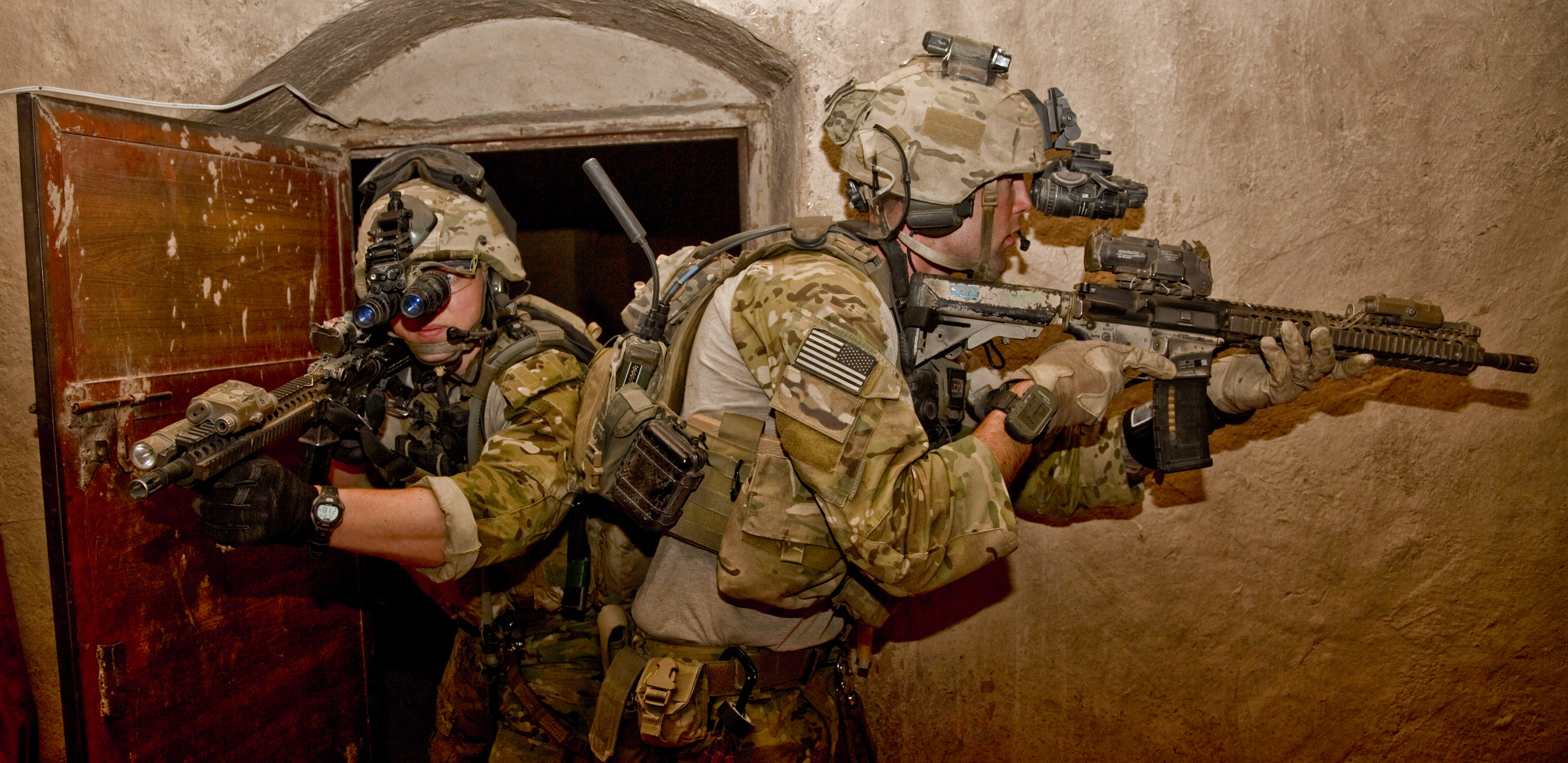
Rangers take part in a raid during Operation in Nahr-e Saraj, Afghanistan

The United States continues to have no designated "commando" units. The closest equivalent to other nations Commando units remain the U.S. Army's 75th Ranger Regiment and Marine Raiders, which specialize in most of the same tasks and missions and were specifically modelled after the British Commandos.

During the Vietnam War the U.S. Army's 5th Special Forces Group (Airborne) instituted, "Special Operations Augmentation Recondo School," an acronym for Reconnaissance Commando. The school was at Nha Trang Air Base, north of the massive U.S. Navy and Air Force Base at Cam Ranh Bay. Recondo School trained small, heavily armed long-range reconnaissance teams the art of patrolling deep in enemy-held territory. All students were combat veterans and came from the ranks of the U.S. Army, U.S. Marine Corps Force Recon Battalions, and the Army of the Republic of South Korea. The Army of the Republic of Vietnam had their own school. The modern U.S. Army's Long-range surveillance, Reconnaissance, surveillance, and target acquisition, and the U.S. Marine Corps' Force Recon all derive some portion of their legacies from the Recondo program and utilize the name "Recondos" informally.

== Vietnam ==
NVA commando or sapper at work

- The Vietnamese Commando Forces, a military specific group which is comprised into the People's Army of Vietnam.

== See also ==
- List of paratrooper forces
- List of ranger forces
- Spetsnaz
