= Lulworth =

Coordinates: 50.6208°N 2.2498°W

Lulworth is the popular name for an area on the coast of Dorset, South West England notable for its castle and cove. However, there is no actual place or feature called simply "Lulworth", the villages are East and West Lulworth and the coastal feature is Lulworth Cove.

See:

- East Lulworth (village)
- Lulworth Castle
- Lulworth Cove (a tourist location / bay)
- Lulworth Estate
- Lulworth Ranges and associated Lulworth Camp
- West Lulworth (village)
- S/Y Lulworth (1920 yacht)
