= Castle Inn =

Public house in West Lulworth, Dorset, England

The Castle Inn
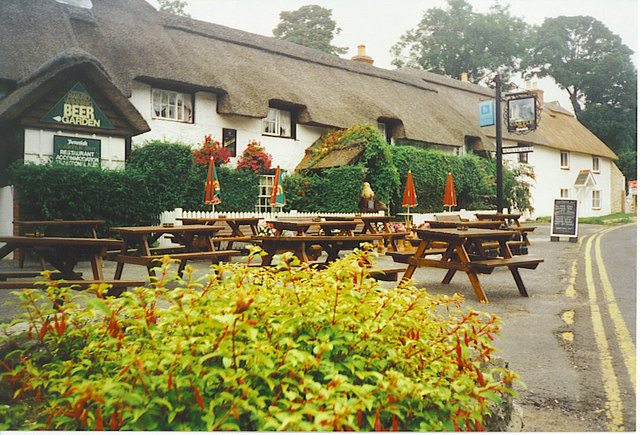

- Location within Dorset
- Former names: Jolly Sailor (to 1929); Travellers Rest; Green Man
- Etymology: Lulworth Castle; Green Man

General information
- Type: Public house
- Coordinates: 50.62638°N 2.2462°W
- Current tenants: Alex Halliday

Technical details
- Material: Brick; Thatch

Design and construction
- Awards: CAMRA Cider Pub of the Year 2014
- Designations: Grade II listed

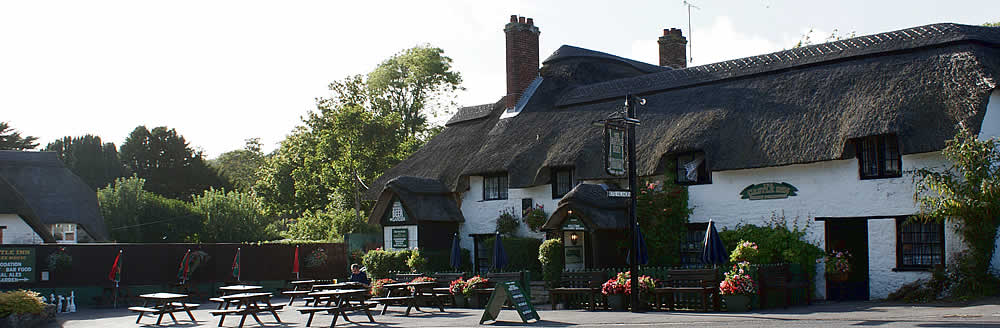
The Castle Inn, West Lulworth, Dorset

The Castle Inn is a public house in West Lulworth, Dorset, England, which dates from the 16th century. It was originally called The Green Man, and later The Jolly Sailor. As of 2014, the pub is a popular traditional pub and hotel. The Castle Inn has a focus upon traditional real ales, real ciders and fresh food.

== History ==
The pub has changed names many times during its history. It has been known as both the Green Man and the Traveller's Rest at various points. It is currently named after the early 17th century hunting lodge Lulworth Castle, situated in East Lulworth. An 1846 document held by the Dorset History Centre amongst the papers of the brewers White and Bennett of Wareham notes that it was then called The Jolly Sailor and formerly called The Lugger.

In Dorset Pubs & Breweries, Tim Edgell states that the pub dates back 400 years, and that it was a homebrew pub in the 19th century.

Its name was changed from The Jolly Sailor in about 1860 - it was still The Jolly Sailor in 1859, but was Castle Inn in the 1861 and subsequent censuses.

It is a Grade II listed building, described by English Heritage as being probably 18th century.

== Cider ==
The West Country is known for its cider but many pubs in the area are tied houses and so only stock a limited range. The Castle Inn is a free house and stocks many different varieties including "real cider". Cider in the UK is legally allowed to contain as little as 35% apple juice (fresh or from concentrate). CAMRA says that "real cider" must be at least 90% fresh apple juice.

Real cider is an artisanal product made in the traditional way from pure fresh apple juice, and local examples offered include Dorset Tit from the Marshwood Vale.

== Reviews and awards ==
In Slow Dorset, Alexandra Richards comments that the inn is known for its food and range of local beers, as well as being very dog-friendly.

The inn was recommended by Lesley Gillilan, writing in The Guardian in 2013, as worthy of investigation for its cider alone.

In 2014, the inn was recognised by the Campaign for Real Ale (CAMRA) as their Cider Pub of the Year. CAMRA said, "Their commitment to real cider and perry is second to none and the quality of drinks they have in the pub at any one time is truly staggering. As well as that the pub is a beautiful place to enjoy a drink, with all the country charm you could hope for."

== See also ==
- Lulworth Cove
