= 1st Commando Brigade (Turkey) =

- 1. Komando Tugayı
- Active: 1965–present
- Country: Turkey
- Branch: Turkish Army
- Type: airborne operation
- Size: Brigade
- Garrison/HQ: Kayseri
- Mottos: Strong, Brave, Ready!
- Engagements: Syrian–Turkish border clashes during the Syrian Civil War 2008 Turkish incursion into northern Iraq; War in Afghanistan; Operation Allied Force; Bosnian War; Kosovo War; Kurdish–Turkish conflict Turkish Invasion of Cyprus

Commanders
- Current commander: Brigadier General Osman Aytaç

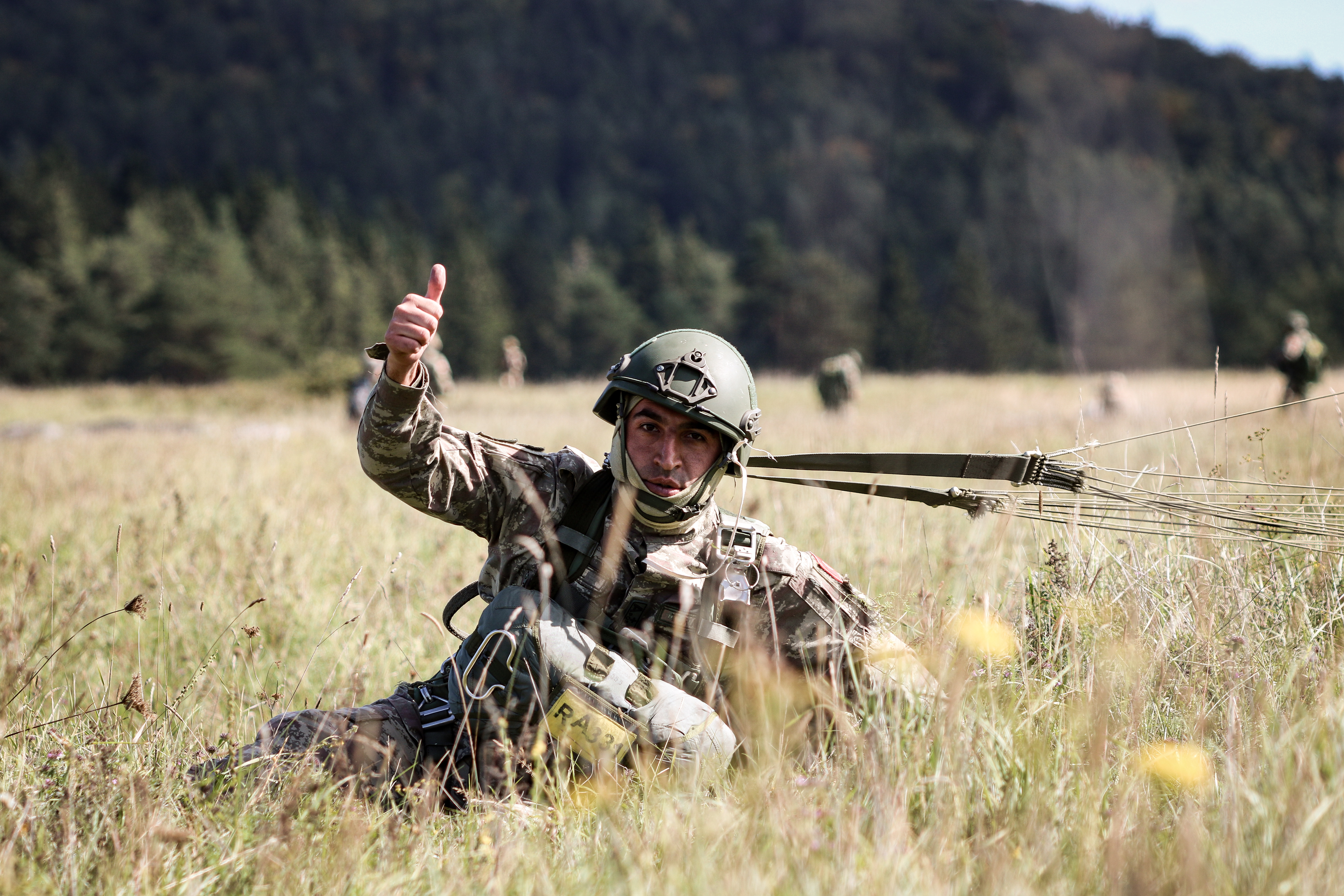
An operative in Saber Junction 2019

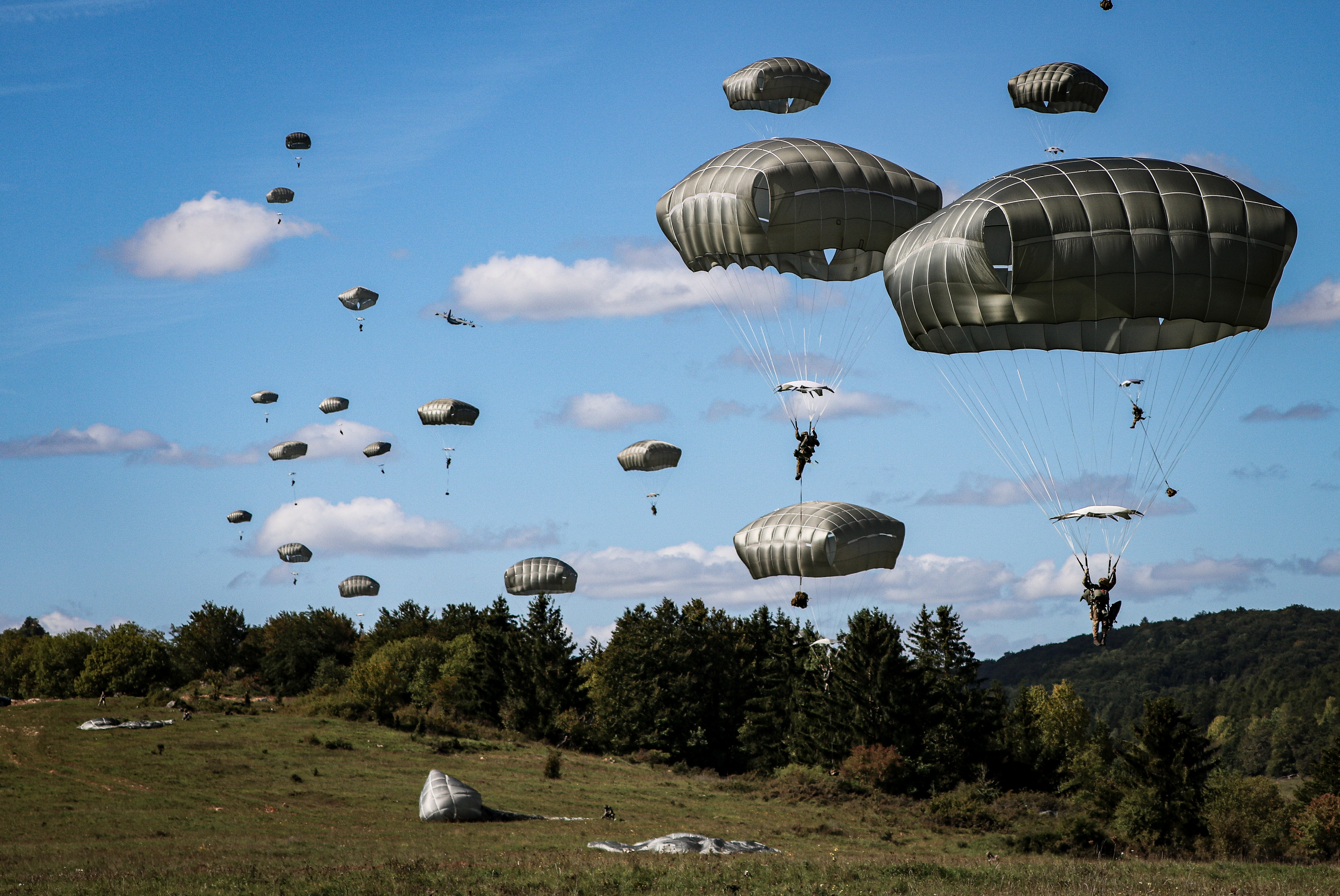
Operatives in Saber Junction 2019

The 1st Commando Brigade (Turkish: 1. Komando Tugayı) is a brigade of the Turkish Army, based in Kayseri.

== History ==
Founded as a paratrooper brigade, later it was restructured as a ground force. A battalion from the brigade was detached and expanded which became the 5th Hakkari Mountain and Commando Brigade. Although formally being a paratrooper brigade, parachuting and para-warfare training is still given in this brigade to every one of its troops, including the special forces Gendarmerie Special Operations Command team within its brigade.

The Brigade was involved in the Turkish invasion of Cyprus, and fought beside airborne commandos (Bolu) and Naval Infantry Brigade (Izmir). It served as a fighting force against the Cypriot National Guard. Furthermore, the 1st Commando Brigade also acted as a peacekeeping force in the Bosnian War and the War in Afghanistan. It has engaged Kurdish separatists in platoon size forces alongside the Hakkari Mountain and Commando Brigade in operations within and across Turkey's borders into Iraq in the anti Insurgency campaign launched by the PKK from Iraq into Turkey.

In its latest engagement, the 1st Commando Brigade along with other Brigades across Turkey deployed troops along the Syrian border. In which causing it to Part in the Syrian–Turkish border incidents during the Syrian Civil War.

== Training ==
Training is given to officers, non-commissioned officers, and soldiers. Military parachute training at all levels is provided to the military personnel of all rank in the Turkish Armed Forces only by this brigade. In addition, contract soldiers and conscripts receive basic military and commando basic training.

Training periods vary between 3 weeks for basic military training, 5 weeks for commando basic training and 3 to 9 weeks for military parachute training.

=== Structure ===
The composition and size of this brigade is different from other commando formation of the Turkish Army. There are:

- 4 Commando Battalions
- 1 Airborne Battalion
- 1 Artillery Battalion
- 1 Logistics Support Battalion
- 1 Training Battalion
- 1 Training Support Battalion

== Losses ==
As of 10 June 2015, the 1st Commando Brigade has a total of 342 killed in action, of which 76 are in the Cyprus invasion and 235 in the Homeland Security Operation.

== Gallery ==
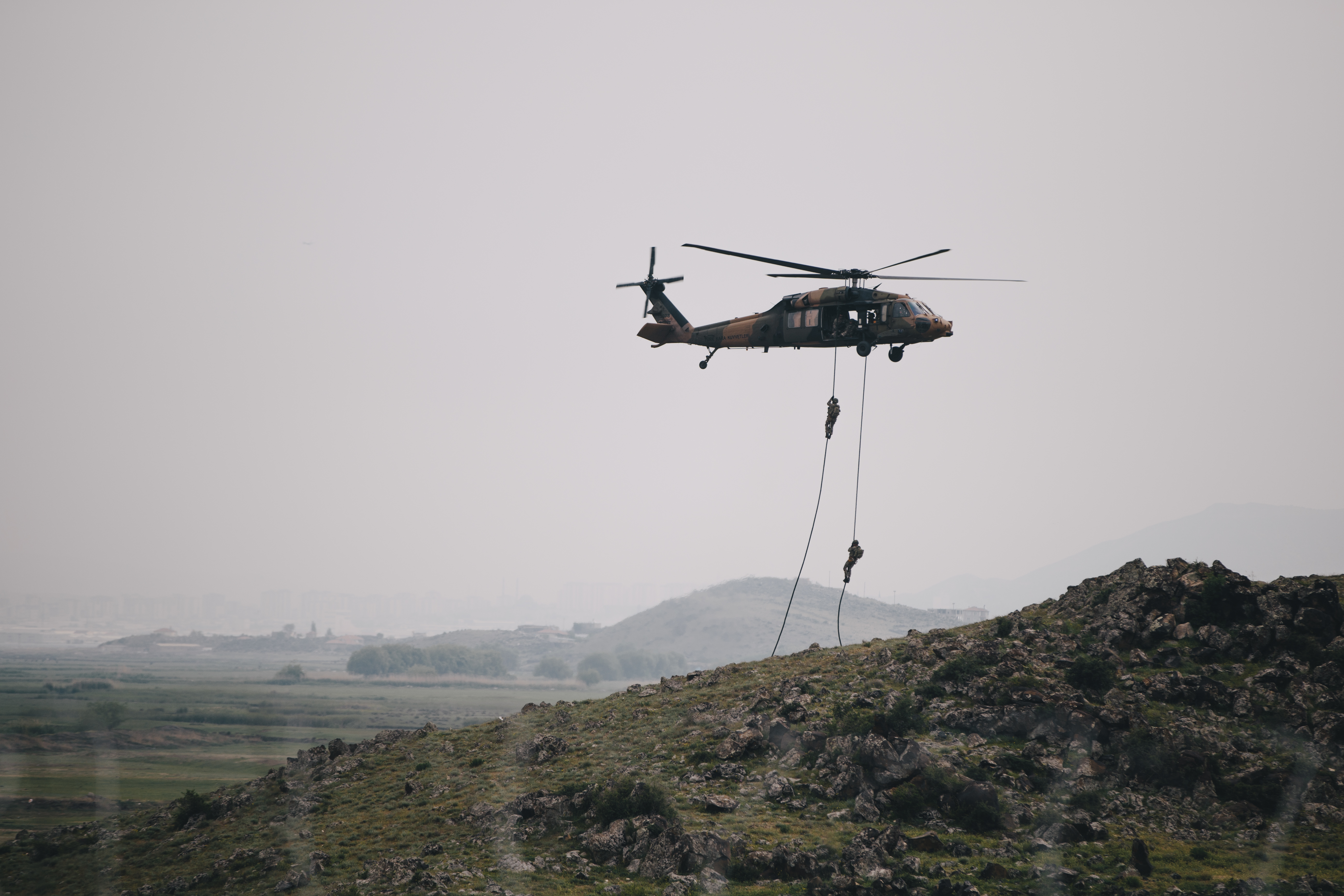
Two Turkish commandos propel from an S-70 utility helicopter in support of ground combat operations during the culminating event of Exercise Erciyes

== See also ==
- List of Turkish Commando Brigades
- Kurdish–Turkish conflict (1978–present)
