= Tyneham House =

House in Dorset, England

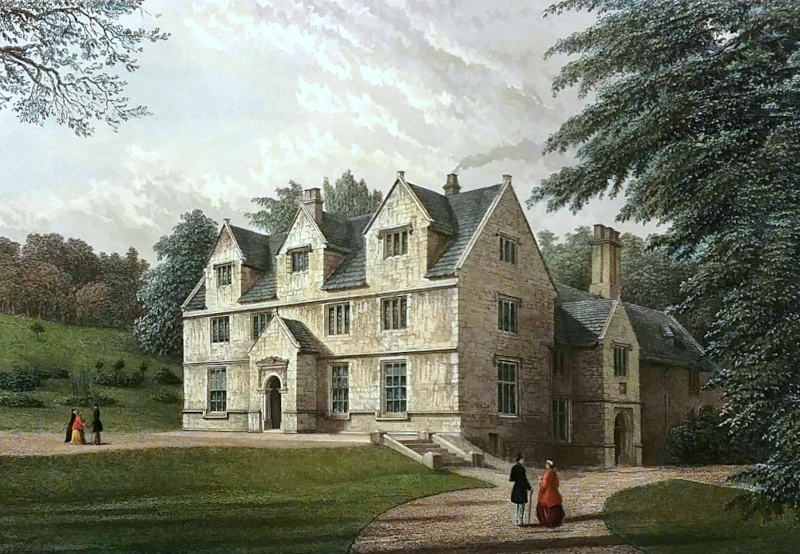
- Tyneham House in a circa 1865 drawing by John Henry Le Keux.

- Location within Dorset
- 50.6211°N 2.1594°W
- Location: Tyneham, Dorset, England

Tyneham House is a ruined Elizabethan detached house, located in Tyneham, Dorset, England. It was built by Henry Williams between 1563 and 1583 and was for over 250 years occupied by the Bond family, who were the landowners of Tyneham. The house, which was once a scheduled monument, fell into dereliction after Tyneham was requisitioned and evacuated by the War Office in 1943. The Army partially demolished the house in 1968 and some of its stone and features were salvaged for use elsewhere in the county. One part of the remaining ruins, which are out of bounds to the public, was designated a Grade II* listed building in 2025.

== History ==
=== Construction of Tyneham House and occupation ===
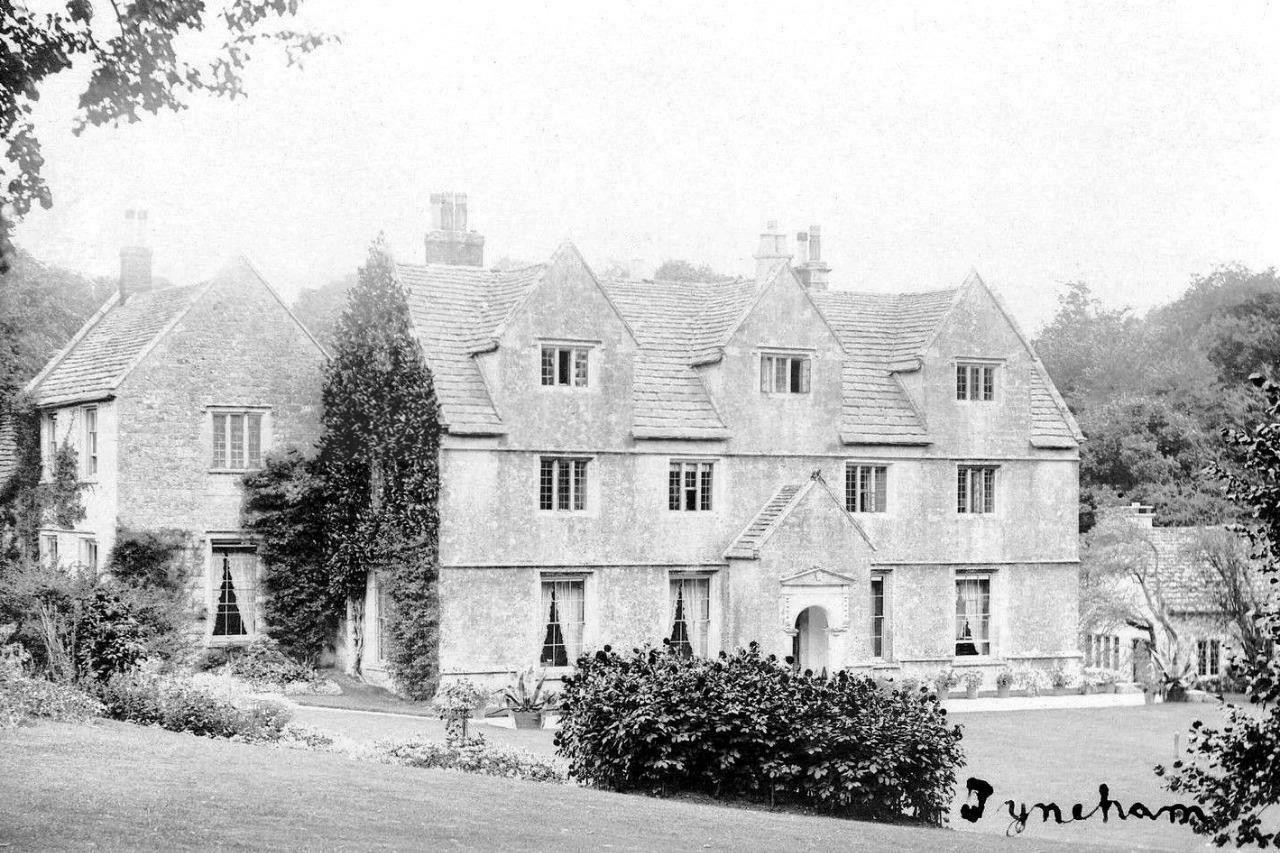
Tyneham House in c. 1900.

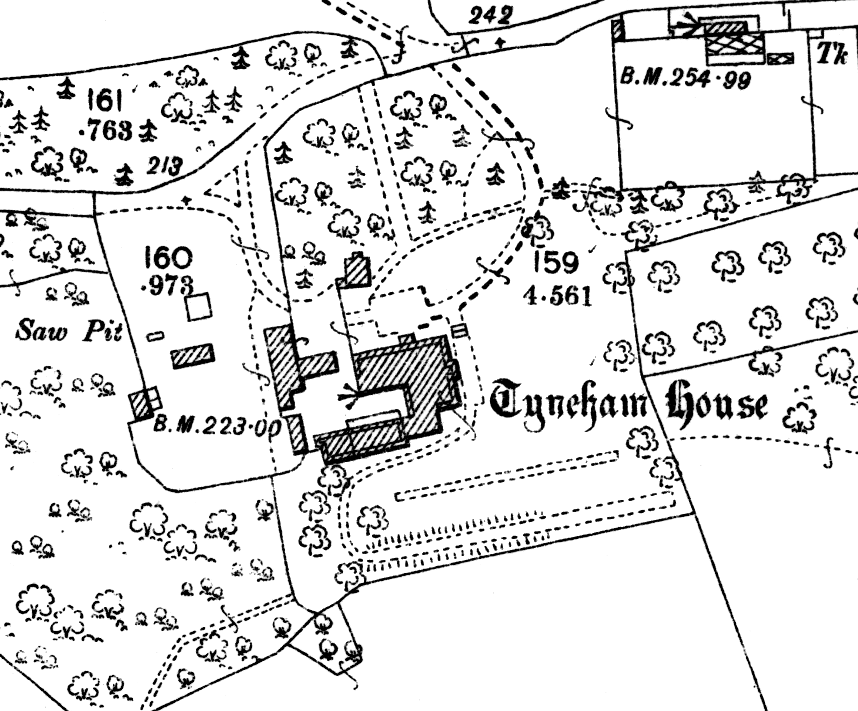
Tyneham House depicted on an Ordnance Survey map from 1902.

Tyneham House was built by Henry Williams between 1563 and 1583. It incorporated a medieval hall and its service rooms, which dates to the 14th century and was built in local stone by the Russell family, possibly as part of an earlier manor house. The hall became the south west wing of the house and was converted in 1567 by dividing it into two floors and adding a new doorway, windows and a chimney. The house's main range was completed in 1583 and a new kitchen wing was added to the north west in circa 1590. The north west wing was extended in the 17th century to provide additional bedrooms and a servants' hall.

Four generations of the Williams family occupied the house before the Bond family acquired Tyneham in 1683. Tyneham House remained in the ownership of the Bond family into the 1940s. In 1820, alterations and additions were made under Rev. William Bond, including rebuilding the east part of the south west wing and extending the main range westwards. A north porch was added in c. 1861 and the main range was refronted in 1914.

Following the death of William Henry Bond in 1935, Tyneham House was offered for let, furnished, "for the summer months or by the year", through Messrs. James Styles and Whitlock of London. The advertisement listed the following accommodation and facilities: a hall, three sitting rooms, 15 bed and dressing rooms, a boudoir, two bathrooms, stabling, a garage, terraced gardens, a walled garden and a grass tennis court. It was let until 1939.

=== Military requisition ===
In 1941, the Royal Air Force requisitioned Tyneham House for use as both an administrative centre and accommodation site for personnel of the Women's Auxiliary Air Force working at the nearby RAF Brandy Bay. Much of the house's furniture was moved into the cellar and its books were put into storage in the granary. The furniture was damaged or destroyed when the cellar flooded after the surface drains were damaged by RAF lorries.

In December 1943, Tyneham was requisitioned and evacuated by the War Office as part of a 7,500 acre expansion of their Lulworth Ranges associated with the Armoured Fighting Vehicles Gunnery School at Lulworth Camp. Although the requisition was originally to be temporary, Tyneham was compulsorily purchased by the War Office in 1948 and, after disputes, they compulsorily acquired the house in 1952.

=== Dereliction ===
As a scheduled monument, the Army intended to safeguard the now vacant Tyneham House as best possible, although the Ministry of Town and Country Planning said in 1948 that he was unable to guarantee the house would be preserved and spared from being hit by shells.

By 1949, the house had suffered from the theft of lead from parts of the roof, resulting in water damage to the interior, and its gardens had become a "wilderness". In 1952, John Gale, writing in The Observer, noted how the "deserted" house's windows were "grotesquely blindfolded with sheets of black corrugated iron" and the garden had "run wild amid barbed wire".

In 1952, the Ministry of Works gave some of the house's carved oak panelling and overmantel and heraldic glass to Dorset County Museum. These were re-erected in the council chamber and library in memory of William Ralph Garneys Bond, the last of the Bond family to live at Tyneham House and the president of the Dorset Natural History and Archaeological Society.

In 1965, the Elizabethan section of the house had "collapsed internally, following the loss of its roof" and three years later the Ancient Monuments Board concluded that salvaging the entire building was an "impossibility". It was decided instead that the best option was to "allow certain features which were capable of being dismantled and erected elsewhere to be removed from the site".

=== Partial demolition and aftermath ===
In 1968, the Army undertook the partial demolition of Tyneham House, after the Ancient Monuments Board advised the Ministry of Public Building and Works that the house should be demolished due to its deterioration from weather and vandalism, and its lack of access due to the risk of unexploded shells. The Tyneham Action Group criticised the destruction, which left a roofless ruin, believing the house had been in a "perfectly restorable condition" only a year before.

Numerous parts and features of the house were salvaged and taken elsewhere in the county for reuse. Stone blocks were transported to Athelhampton Hall and the north porch doorway was re-erected in its gardens, and a stone doorway and a porch were re-erected at the manor of Bingham's Melcombe. The National Trust also acquired some of the roofing material to place in reserve until they it was needed for future repair projects.

In c. 1973, the south west medieval wing, which is the house's most substantial survival, underwent some repair and preservation work by the Department of the Environment. A corrugated iron roof was erected over the wing to provide additional protection.

The ruins of the house remain out of bounds to the public due to the risk of unexploded shells. Many of its walls survive at varying heights. In 2025, the south west medieval wing was designated a Grade II* listed building. Historic England noted that it "represents a substantial survival of a significant, high-status medieval dwelling" and added that the "smoke-blackened hall roof is an excellent example of high quality medieval craftsmanship and has few close parallels in Dorset, being an important and early survival".

== Gallery ==
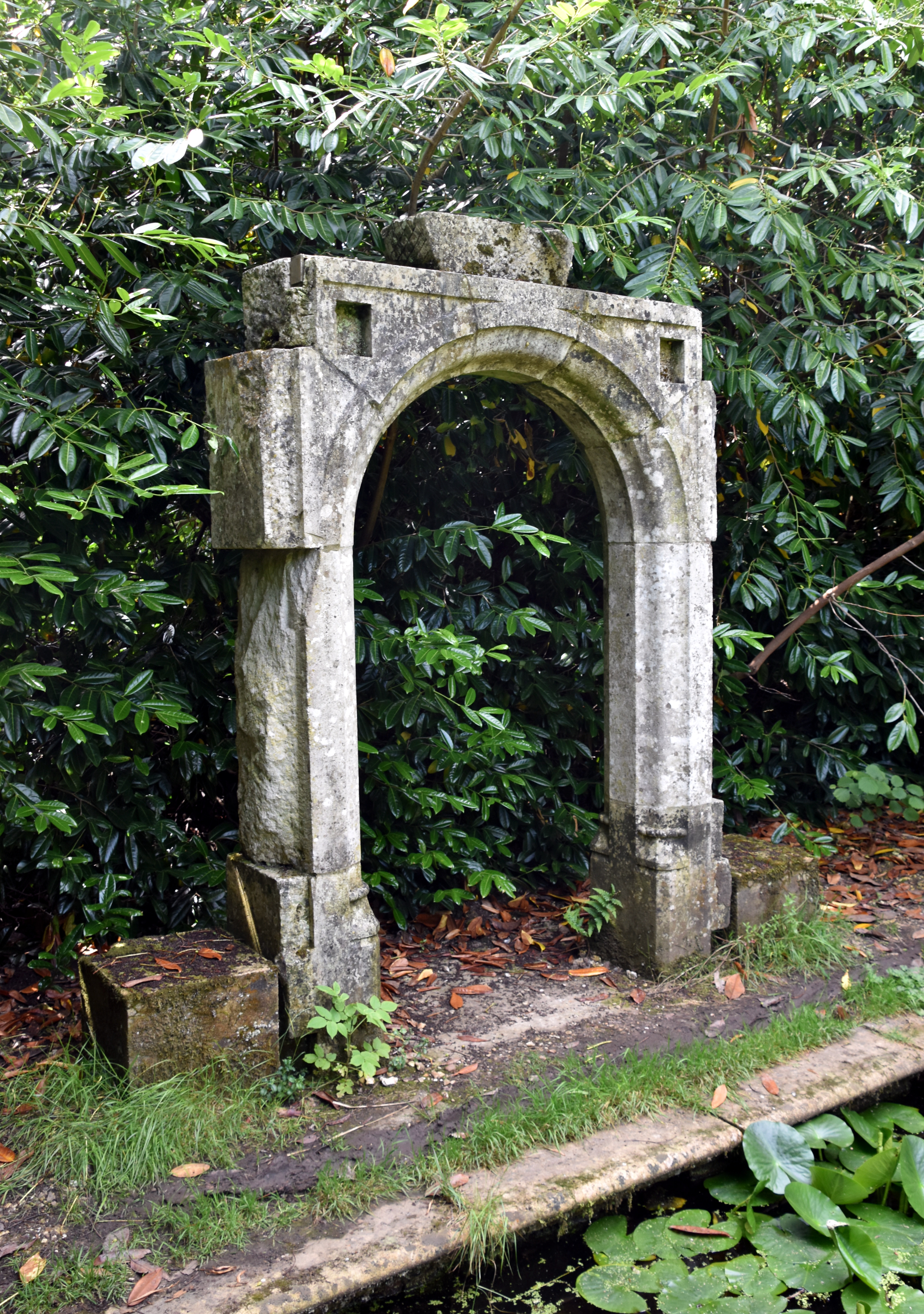
The north porch of Tyneham House, now in the gardens of Athelhampton House.

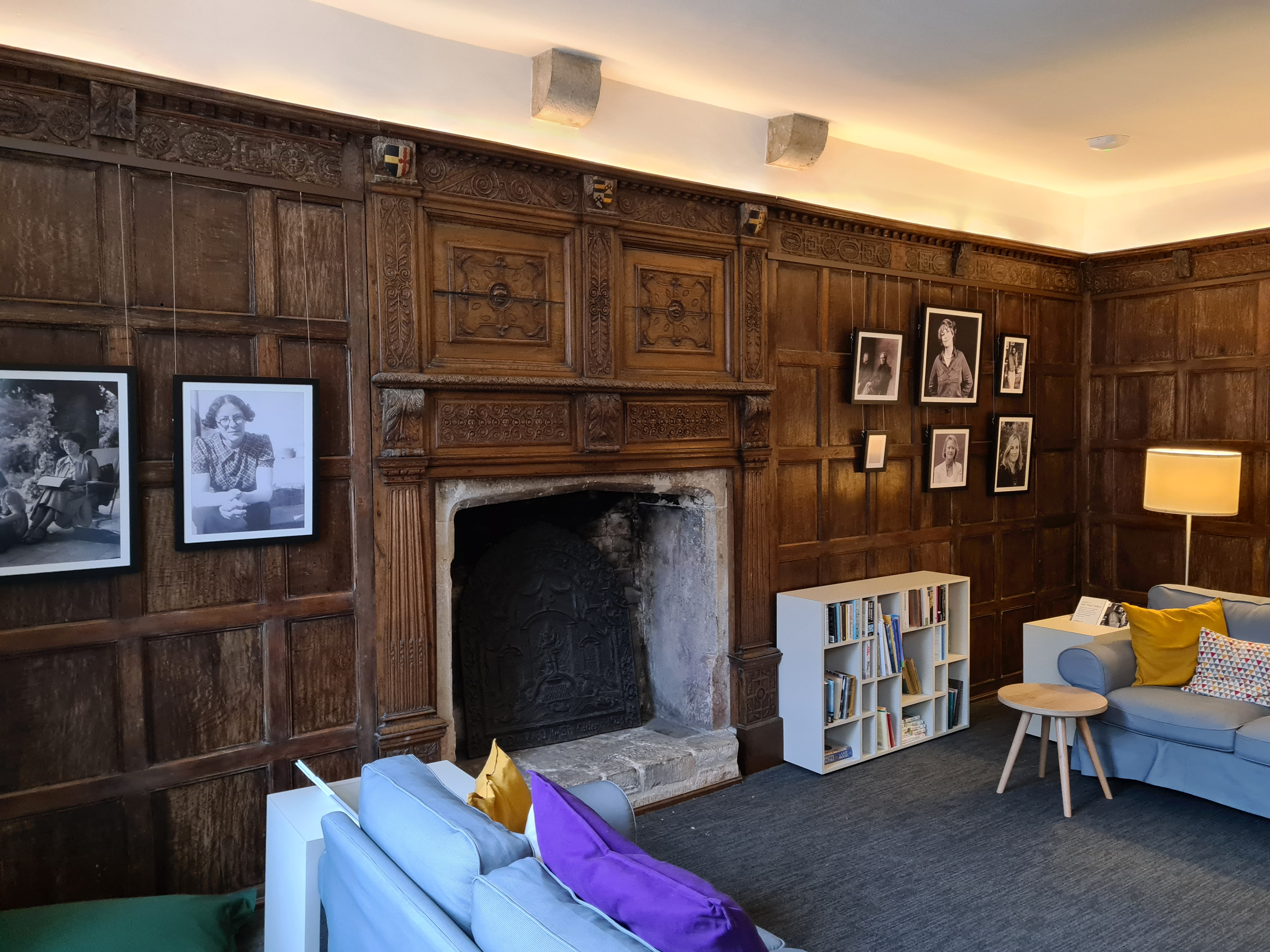
Oak panelling and overmantel from Tyneham House, now in Dorset Museum.

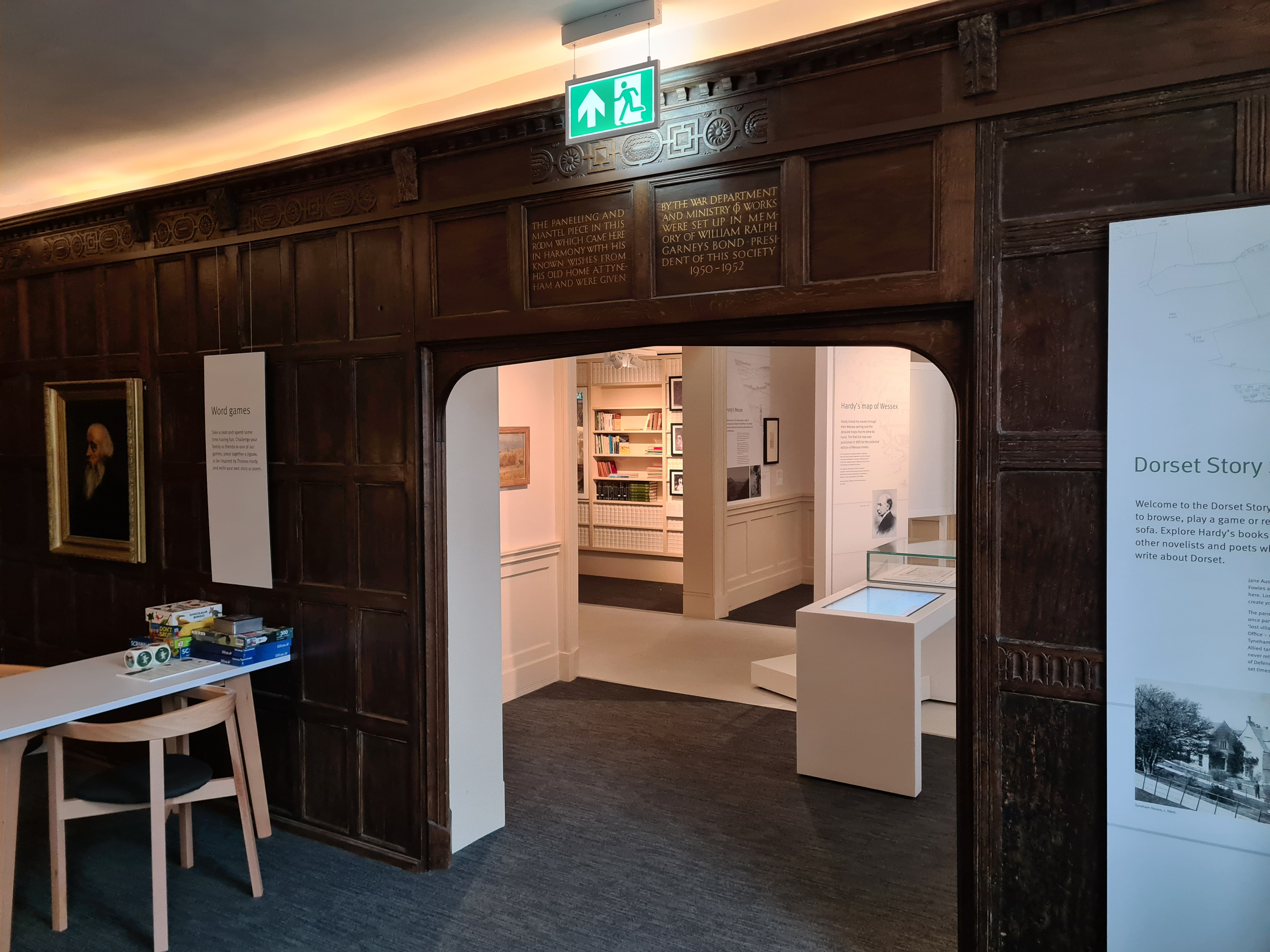
Oak panelling from Tyneham House, now in Dorset Museum.
