= Osman Pamukoğlu =

Turkish general and politician (born 1947)

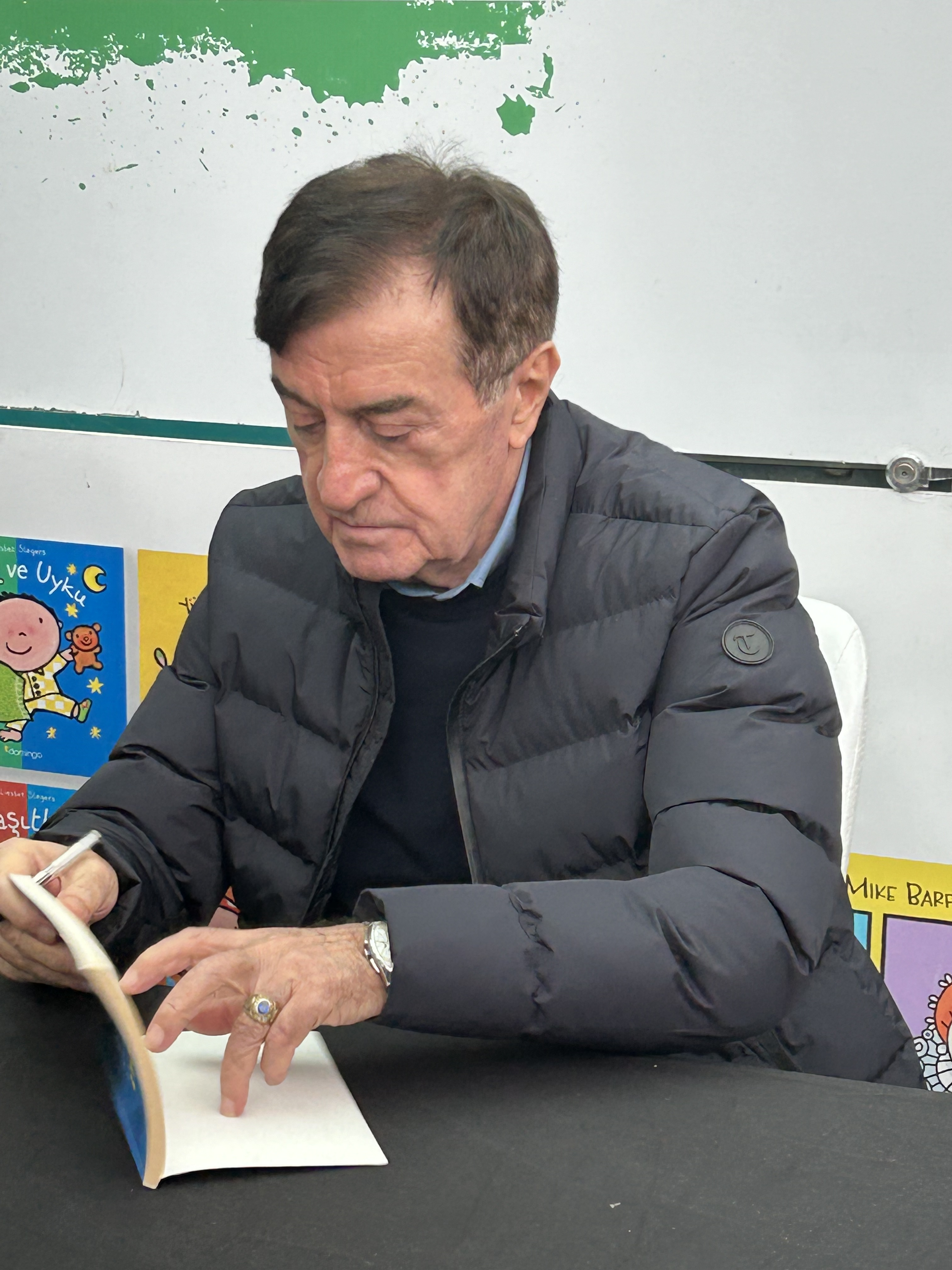
- Born: 27 December 1947 (age 78); Gerze, Sinop, Turkey
- Military career
- Allegiance: Turkey
- Branch: Turkish Land Forces
- Service years: 1967–2002
- Rank: Major general
- Nickname: Efe
- Conflicts: Kurdish–Turkish conflict
- Awards: Medal of Distinguished Courage and Self-Sacrifice (2 times), Medal of Excellence in Unit Training (5 times)

Osman Pamukoğlu is a Turkish retired general known for leading operations against the PKK in southeastern Turkey and Iraq and advocating the depopulation of Kurdish-majority rural areas as part of a counterinsurgency strategy. After his retirement from active duty, he entered politics as a right-wing nationalist, founding the Rights and Equality Party and advocating "a ruthless military solution to the ongoing socio-political problems".

== Military career ==
Pamukoğlu was born in 1947 in the Gerze district of Sinop. He started military school at the age of 11. He studied at Selimiye Military Middle School, Kuleli Military High School, the Turkish Military Academy, the Tuzla Infantry School Command, the Army War Institute, the Joint War College, and the National Security Academy. He served as an infantry officer for 10 years and a staff officer for 16 years in field command and headquarters officer positions. Between 1990 and 1992, he served as commander of the 42nd Infantry Regiment in Edirne, between 1993 and 1995 as commander of the Mountain and Commando Brigade in Hakkâri, and between 1998 and 2000 as commander of the 28th Mechanised Infantry Division in Northern Cyprus, and the Tuzla Infantry School Command in Istanbul between 2000 and 2001.

He was promoted to brigadier general in 1993 and rose to the rank of major general in 1997. Pamukoğlu retired from the rank of major general in 2002, having served a total of 43 years in the Turkish Armed Forces. Pamukoğlu has been awarded the Gold Medal of Distinguished Courage and Self-Sacrifice, the Medal of Distinguished Courage and Self-Sacrifice twice, and the Medal of Excellence in Unit Training five times. Pamukoğlu is the only person in the Turkish Army to have received five Medals of Excellence in Unit Training. He retired from military service at the age of 55.

=== Battles against PKK ===
In 2007, Serdar Akınan's documentary Kan Uykusu, which examined the Turkish-PKK conflict during his years of service, focused on his efforts fighting against the PKK.

21 of the cross-border operations conducted against the PKK were carried out by Pamukoğlu. Pamukoğlu claims that most of these 21 cross-border operations were unauthorised and that permission was only obtained from Ankara on one occasion. He also claimed that prior to the operation for which permission was obtained, certain officials in Ankara had contacted Barzani, who then informed his units.

== Political career ==
Pamukoğlu stepped down from party leadership on 1 March 2015, effectively marking the end of his active political involvement.
