= Hakkari Mountain and Commando Brigade =

- Active: 1986 (originally founded as a battalion from the 1st Commando Brigade (Turkey)–present
- Country: Turkey
- Branch: Turkish Army
- Type: Commando
- Size: Brigade
- Garrison/HQ: Hakkâri
- Nickname: Soldiers of the mountains
- Mottos: Strong, Brave, Ready!
- March: Commando's Oath
- Mascot: Steel Claw
- Engagements: Kurdish–Turkish conflict

Commanders
- Current commander: Levent Köse
- Notable commanders: Hasan Kundakçı; Osman Pamukoğlu Emre Tayanç

The 5th Commando Brigade, more commonly known as the Hakkari Mountain and Commando Brigade (Turkish: Hakkâri Dağ ve Komando Tugayı), stationed in Hakkâri Province in southeastern Turkey, founded as a battalion of the 1st Commando Brigade. Because of the ongoing Kurdish-Turkish conflict, the formation enlarged from the size of a battalion to a brigade.

The brigade has three commando battalions, a support group, and an artillery battalion, which are deployed to different districts of Hakkâri Province.

== Community relations ==
In 2000, the servicemen of the unit started a lecturing program for high school students in Hakkari, who want to take part at the Student Selection and Placement Examination (ÖSYS), which is compulsory to enter a university in Turkey, lack however adequate financial means to visit a cram school. The next year, the lecturing service was extended to a four-group program including also students, who want to prepare themselves for the exams such as the high school entrance (LGS), foreign language proficiency (YDS) and postgraduate education (LES) in addition to a course for English language. Within four years, a total of 2,000 students benefited from this social service of the military at the cram school called "Mehmetçik Dershanesi". The lecturers, in total 19, are selected from the conscripts who are professional teachers.

Soldiers of the brigade in Exercise DYNAMIC MIX '98

== Monuments ==
Inside the brigade, there is the monument of "Those Who Raise the Sun by Their Names" there are 2 arms statues interconnected with each other and a giant commando statue 50 meters after the entrance. The monument was built in 1995 by the brigade commander of the period, Brigadier general Osman Pamukoğlu.

== See also ==
- List of Turkish Commando Brigades

== Reading ==
- Osman Pamukoğlu (2006). Unutulanlar Dışında Yeni Bir Şey Yok (in Turkish). Istanbul: İnkılap Kitabevi. p. 392. ISBN 978-9751022547. Archived from the original on 21 September 2015.
