= Bovington Camp =

British Army base in Dorset, England

- Near Dorchester
- Tank Training Area

Site information
- Type: Barracks
- Owner: Ministry of Defence
- Operator: British Army

Location
- Location within Dorset
- Coordinates: 50.70°N 02.24°W

Site history
- Built: 1899
- Built for: War Office
- In use: 1899–present

Bovington Camp (/ˈbɒvɪŋtən/) is a British Army military base in Dorset, South West England. Together with Lulworth Camp it forms part of Bovington Garrison.

The garrison is home to The Armour Centre and contains two barracks complexes and two forest and heathland training areas that support Phase Two training for soldiers of the Royal Armoured Corps and trade training for the Household Cavalry Regiment as well as other armoured units. It also houses The Tank Museum on its property.

== History ==
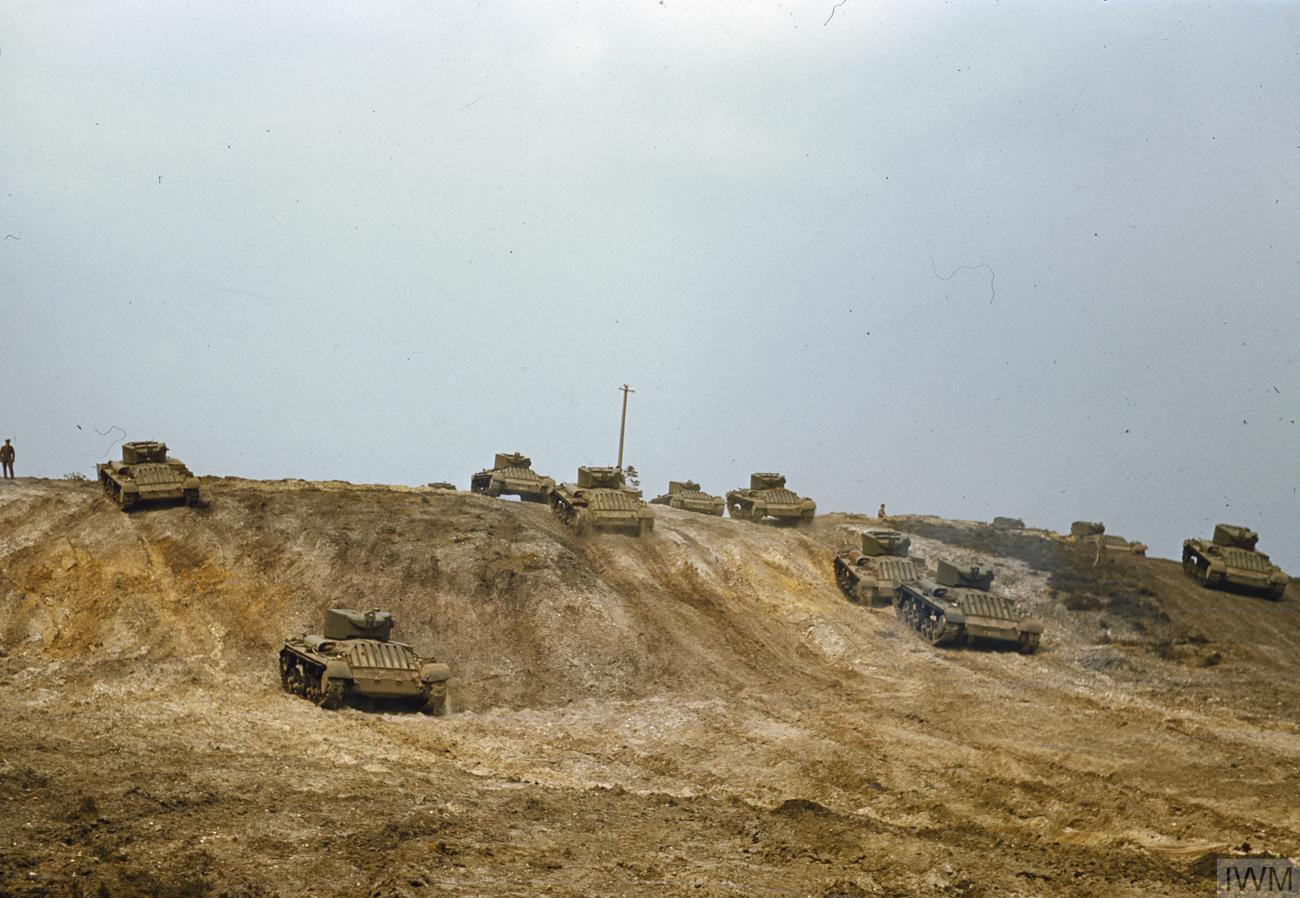
Valentine tanks on a training exercise in 1942

The camps at Bovington and Lulworth were originally established in 1899 as an infantry training area and ranges. In 1916, they became training camps for the Heavy Branch of the Machine Gun Corps which relocated from Norfolk. The Heavy Branch was responsible for the operation of the tank in the British Army. In 1917 the Heavy Branch split from the Machine Gun Corps to become the Tank Corps, with the Depot and Central Schools being based at Bovington.

In 1937 the Central Schools became the Armoured Fighting Vehicles School, with driving and maintenance training at Bovington and gunnery at Lulworth. The School became known as the Royal Armoured Corps Centre in 1947, now renamed The Armour Centre.

== Resident units ==
The camp is home to:

Ministry of Defence

- Defence Support Group

British Army

- Headquarters, Royal Armoured Corps
- Regimental Headquarters, Royal Wessex Yeomanry, at Allenby Barracks
- Regimental Headquarters, Royal Tank Regiment, at Stanley Barracks
- Armoured Trials and Development Unit
- The Armour Centre
  - Combat Communication Information Systems (CIS) School
  - Armoured Fighting Vehicle Training Group
    - Royal Armoured Corps Training Regiment, at Allenby Barracks
    - Armoured Fighting Vehicle Schools Regiment
      - Armoured Fighting Vehicle School of Communications, Driving & Maintenance
      - Armoured Fighting Vehicle School of Gunnery, at Lulworth Camp

Royal Navy

- Royal Navy Centre of Recruiting
  - Royal Navy School of Recruiting
- Viking Squadron, at Stanley Barracks

== Training ==
Soldiers and Officers attend stage 2 training at the Armoured Fighting Vehicle Training Group following initial training and undertake courses in gunnery, signals, driving, vehicle maintenance and tactics. The centre also provides through career, and promotion, training for soldiers and officers. The group delivers course through three operating sections; Communications, Gunnery and Driving & Maintenance. The majority of this training is delivered at Bovington Camp with live gunnery activities taking place at nearby Lulworth Ranges.
