= West Lulworth =

Village and civil parish in Dorset, England

Coordinates: 50.6261°N 2.2476°W

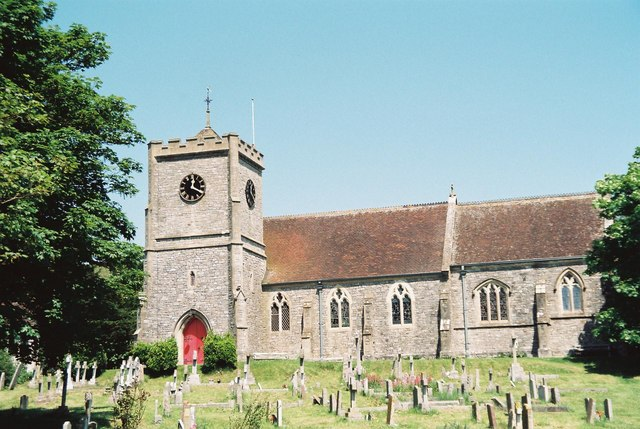
- Parish church of the Holy Trinity

- Location within Dorset
- Population: 714
- OS grid reference: SY825807
- Unitary authority: Dorset
- Ceremonial county: Dorset
- Region: South West
- Country: England
- Sovereign state: United Kingdom
- Post town: Wareham
- Postcode district: BH20
- Police: Dorset
- Fire: Dorset and Wiltshire
- Ambulance: South Western
- UK Parliament: South Dorset

West Lulworth is a village and civil parish in the English county of Dorset, situated on the English Channel beside Lulworth Cove. In the 2011 census the civil parish—which includes most of Lulworth Camp army base—had 291 households and a population of 714. The village is a gateway to the Jurassic Coast World Heritage Site and is a popular tourist destination, especially for day trips.

== History ==
In 1086 in the Domesday Book West Lulworth was not distinguished from neighbouring East Lulworth; only one settlement was recorded, called Luluorde, Luluworde or Loloworde. It had 38.3 households, was in Winfrith Hundred and the lord and tenant-in-chief was Aiulf the Chamberlain. Despite this, East and West Lulworth may have been separate settlements at this time, and definitely were so by the end of the 13th century.

The Castle Inn is one of the oldest pubs in Dorset, dating from the 16th century. Holy Trinity parish church was originally in the village centre, but was demolished in 1869 although the old churchyard still remains. The present church, built of local stone taken from the cove, replaced it. It was largely financed by the then incumbent Rev. William Gildea, brother of philanthropist Sir James Gidea.

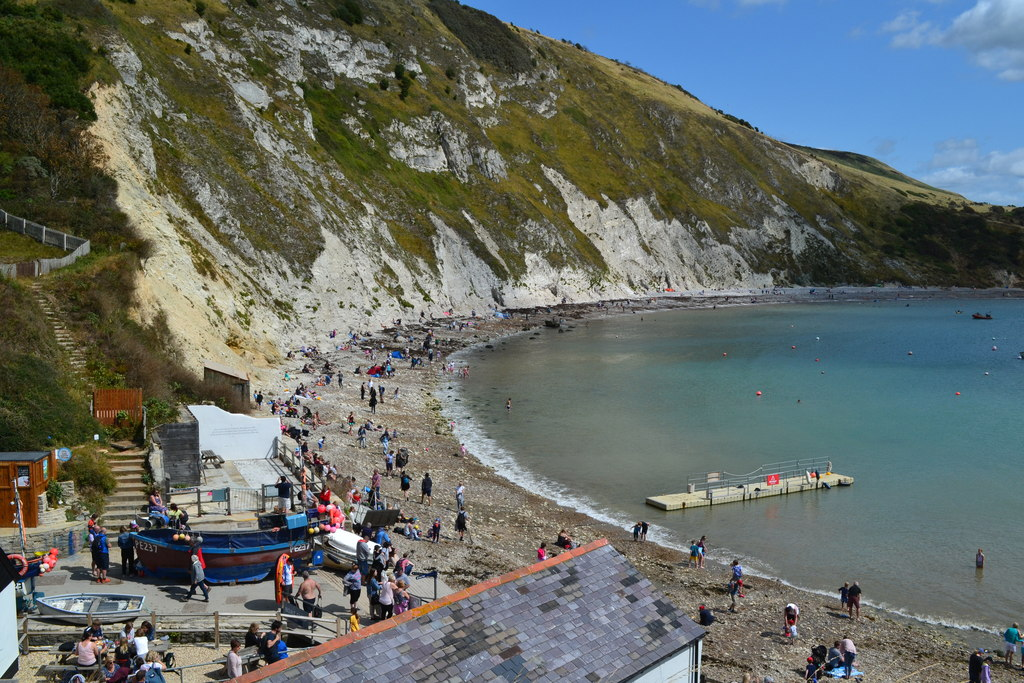
Lulworth Cove

From the late seventeenth to the mid nineteenth century smugglers used Lulworth Cove and other bays and beaches nearby. The building of coastguard cottages, which housed the customs officers still stand above the cove. Lulworth at one point had a mill, powered by water from a nearby spring. It was burnt down during the 19th century and all that remains of its existence is the millpond.

West Lulworth is also the location of the only building designed by the eminent architect Sir Edwin Lutyens in the county of Dorset. Weston was built in 1927 for the surgeon Sir Alfred Downing Fripp after he was left a legacy by a friend.

== Geography ==
West Lulworth civil parish covers 2,593 acres (1,049 ha). The underlying geology is mostly chalk, with a strip of Portland limestone along the coast. At Lulworth Cove the sea has breached the limestone and eroded the soft Wealden Beds behind, resulting in the circular shape of the cove.

West Lulworth village is dominated by two hills: to the east is Bindon Hill, a 170 metres (560 ft) high ridge, which has extensive remains of Iron Age earthworks. To the west is Hambury Tout, which has a barrow on its rounded top.

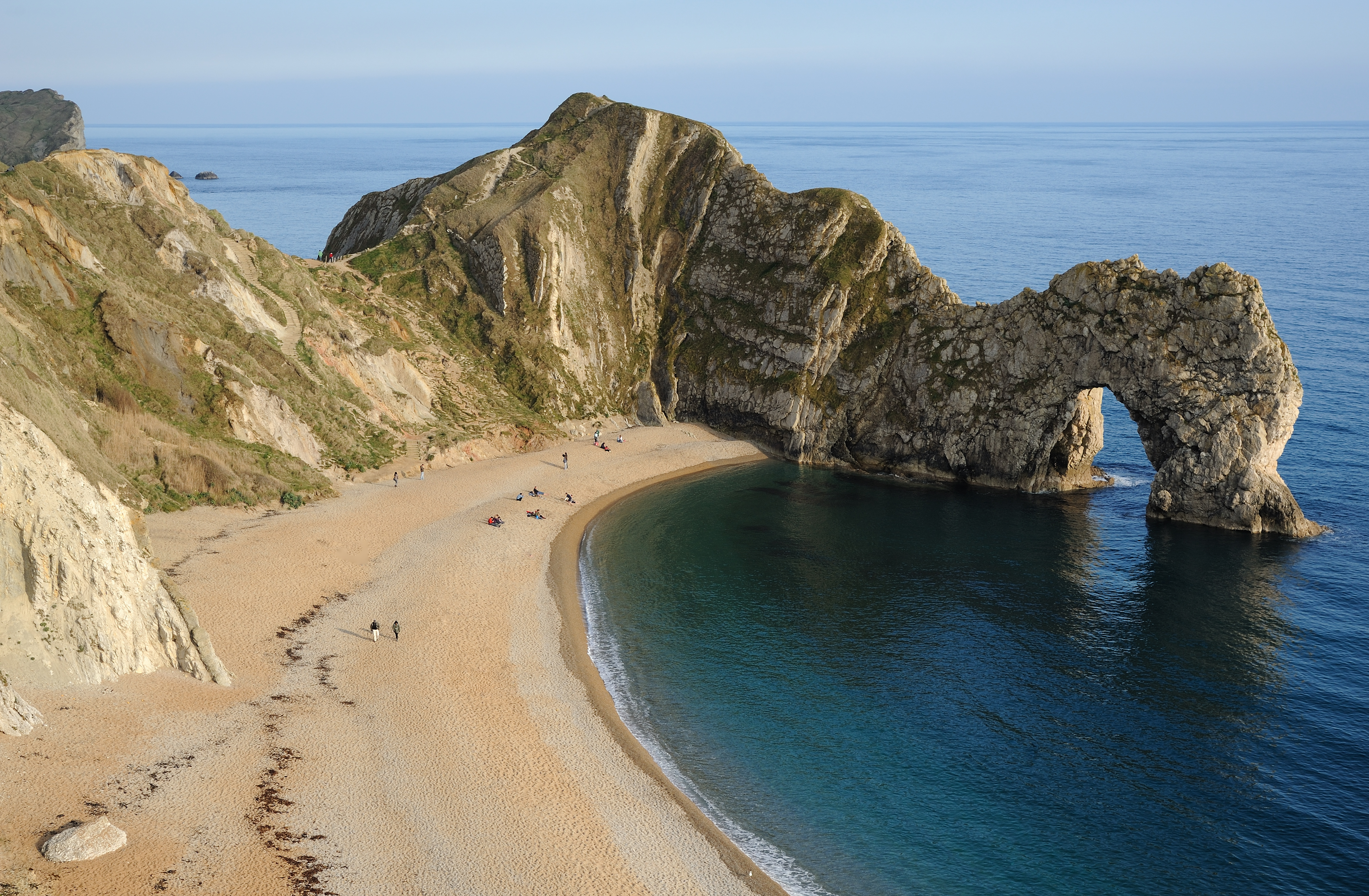
Durdle Door

West Lulworth village is about one-half mile (0.80 km) north of Lulworth Cove, a picturesque, sheltered bay enclosed almost in a circle. The natural limestone arch of Durdle Door is one mile (1.6 km) west along the coast from Lulworth Cove. About 100 metres (330 ft) west of the cove is Stair Hole, a geological formation of caves with blowholes.

== Amenities ==
West Lulworth village has a first school, a youth hostel, several small hotels, pubs and a general store. Commercial fishing is based at the cove, together with scallop diving and leisure trips. The stores and hotels line the route between the town and the cove, with several small stores selling locally caught seafood.

== Governance ==
West Lulworth is part of West Purbeck electoral ward. This ward extends northwards from the Cove to East Stoke and the intermediate area. The total population of the ward at the 2011 Census was 1,464. West Purbeck ward is part of the UK Parliamentary Constituency for South Dorset.

== Transport ==
West Lulworth is the terminus of the B3070 road which runs 5 miles (8.0 km) from the A352 road at Wool. The nearest rail access is also from Wool railway station. Scheduled buses run to Weymouth and Poole. Transport and car parking infrastructure has been a problem for the village in recent decades due to the volume and seasonal nature of the tourist traffic, with reported problems including car parks overflowing and traffic blocking emergency access.

== See also ==
- West Lulworth Priory
- East Lulworth
