= Lulworth Camp =

Army base in Dorset, England

- Purbeck Hills, Dorset
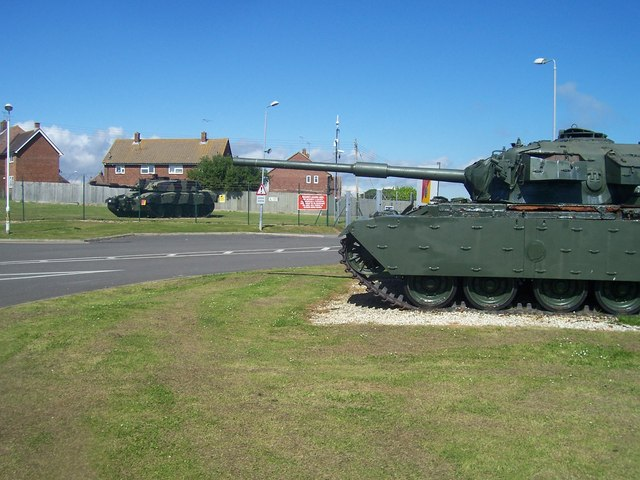
- Gate guardians at the entrance to Lulworth Camp

Site information
- Type: Barracks
- Owner: Ministry of Defence
- Operator: British Army

Location
- Location within Dorset
- Coordinates: 50.63333°N 2.23333°W

Site history
- Built: 1918
- Built for: War Office
- In use: 1918-Present

Lulworth Camp is a British Army base that is home to the Armoured Fighting Vehicle Gunnery School and runs the Lulworth Ranges on the southern coast of Dorset, England. It is part of Bovington Garrison and is located on the Purbeck Ridge between the villages of East and West Lulworth. The camp lies immediately southeast of the road junction between the B 3070 and B 3071 and about a mile northeast of Lulworth Cove.

== History ==
The camp was established in 1918 and has been in continuous use since then. Bovington and Lulworth have been the main British training areas for tanks and armoured warfare since their introduction. The camp is currently home to the Armoured Fighting Vehicle Schools Regiment (AFVSR) Gunnery School.

On 8 February 2023, President of Ukraine Volodymyr Zelenskyy visited the base as part of a state visit. Along with British prime minister Rishi Sunak, he met Ukrainian troops who were being trained to use Challenger 2 tanks, part of Operation Interflex.
