= 2016 Turkish coup d'état attempt =

Failed military coup attempt in Turkey

- Part of the AK Party–Gülen movement conflict
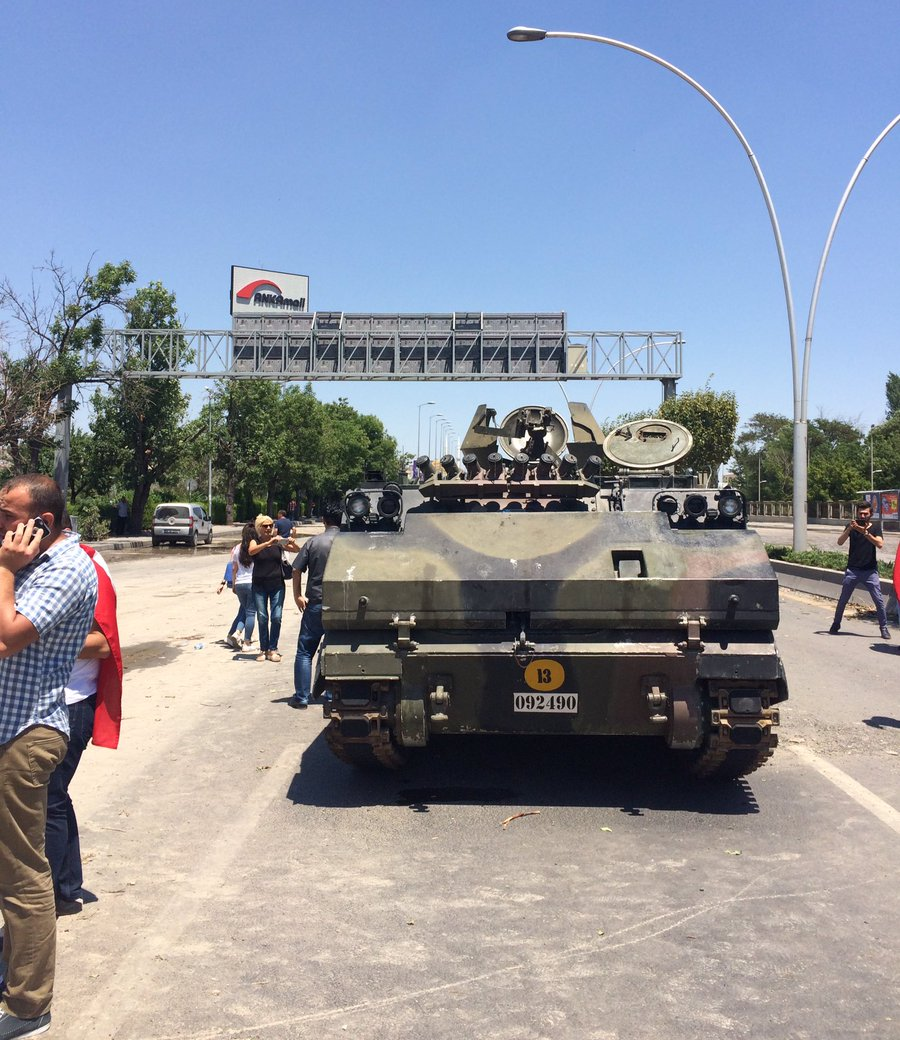
- Abandoned military vehicle used during the coup in Ankara, near the bombed building of the Directorate of Police, 16 July
Date	15–16 July 2016
Location	Mostly Ankara, Istanbul, Marmaris
Result	Turkish government victory: Coup d'état failed; Beginning of the democratic backsliding of Turkey; Freedom House has lowered Turkey's Freedom Rating every year since the 2016 coup attempt, and since 2018 has classified it as "Not Free".; 3 million Turkish citizens were tried for terrorism between 2016 and 2024; 511,000 Gülen followers detained for terror charges between 2016 and 2019 only.

Belligerents
Peace at Home Council; Elements of the Turkish Armed Forces; Elements of the First Army; Factions of the Second Army; Presidential Guard; Elements of the Third Army; Elements of the Turkish Air Force; Elements of the Turkish Naval Forces; Elements of the Gendarmerie General Command; Gülen movement (per Turkey); Supported by: Egypt; United Arab Emirates (alleged, implied in leaked e-mails); United States (alleged by some Turkish officials, denied by the U.S.); Israel (alleged)	Government of Turkey and loyal state institutions; Turkish Armed Forces; Turkish National Police; Police Special Operation Department; National Intelligence Organization; Municipalities; Pro-government protesters; Supported by: United Kingdom; Russia; Ukraine; Belarus; Iran; Somalia; Qatar; Hamas; (Syria) Syrian opposition

Commanders and leaders
Fethullah Gülen (alleged); Adil Öksüz; Akın Öztürk (POW) (alleged); Mehmet Dişli (POW) (alleged); Adem Huduti (POW) (alleged); Semih Terzi † (alleged); Bekir Ercan Van (POW) (alleged); İrfan Kızılaslan (POW) (alleged)	Recep Tayyip Erdoğan; Binali Yıldırım; Hakan Fidan; Hulusi Akar (POW); Ümit Dündar; Zekai Aksakallı; Salih Zeki Çolak (POW); Bülent Bostanoğlu; Abidin Ünal (POW)

Strength
1.5% of the Turkish Armed Forces (8,651 soldiers); 1,676 NCOs; 1,214 military academy students 74 tanks 172 armored vehicles 35 planes (allegedly); 37 helicopters (allegedly); 3 warships (allegedly)	99% of Turkish Armed Forces ranking officers 66% of the military's top leadership

Casualties and losses
24–104 people killed, 2 helicopters shot down (unconfirmed); 22 died in prison	67 pro-state forces killed (62 police officers and 5 loyal soldiers)
- During 15 July night, 179 civilians killed 270–350 killed and 2,185 wounded overall After the coup attempt: 3 million Turkish citizens were investigated for terrorism between 2016 and 2024. 511,000 detained by official numbers (10,012 soldiers, 1,481 judiciary members), of which 127, 000 were arrested 150,000 government officials and workers suspended 3 news agencies, 16 TV stations, 23 radio stations, 45 newspapers, 15 magazines and 29 publishers were ordered to shut down Over 12 billion $ worth property linked to Gulen movement were seized by the Turkish government. 1,043 private schools, 1,229 charities and foundations, 19 trade unions, 15 universities and 35 medical institutions affiliated with the movement shut down by the Erdogan government

On the evening of 15 July 2016, an attempted military coup occurred in Turkey, orchestrated by a faction within the Turkish Armed Forces of 8,500 soldiers and military cadets according to a statement by the Turkish General Staff, identifying themselves as the "Peace at Home Council" which might have never been existed. Armed troops attempted to seize control of several key locations in Ankara, Istanbul, and Marmaris but were defeated by a mix of loyalist soldiers and civilian protestors.

The Council cited an erosion of secularism, elimination of democratic rule, disregard for human rights, and Turkey's loss of credibility in the international arena as reasons for the coup. That same evening, Erdoğan stated that they had evidence the coup leaders were linked to the Gülen movement, and alleged that the United States was harboring Gülen. The Gülen movement had over 2,000 schools, hundreds of charities, and hospitals globally by 2015. Erdoğan had designated the movement as a terrorist organization in May 2016, citing the police investigation of the 2013 corruption scandal which he described as a "judicial coup attempt" allegedly carried out by police officers linked to the movement. The Gülen movement was led by Fethullah Gülen, a Turkish businessman and a well-known Islamic scholar who lived in exile in Pennsylvania. In response, Gülen called for an international commission to investigate the failed coup and said he would accept the findings if such a body found evidence of his guilt. In contrast, the Erdoğan government did not agree even to a proposal for a national parliamentary committee to investigate the events of 15 July.

Events surrounding the coup attempt and the purges in its aftermath reflect a complex power struggle between Islamist elites in Turkey.

During the coup attempt, over 300 people were killed, and more than 2,100 were injured. Turkish government claimed that many government buildings, including the Turkish Parliament and the Presidential Palace, were bombed from the air, however independent journalists like Ahmet Nesin argued that the marks seen in the photos of the parliament building, such as burns, holes or damage to the surrounding structures do not match what would be expected from a missile or airstrike, therefore he finds such claims absurd.

The next morning Erdoğan called the coup attempt "a gift from God" and started his mass arrests and purges, with at least 40,000 detained in the first days, including at least 10,000 soldiers and 2,745 judges (who were arrested the next morning on 16 July), for being affiliated with the coup attempt. 15,000 education staff were also suspended and the licenses of 21,000 teachers working at private institutions were revoked after the government stated they were loyal to Gülen. More than 77,000 people were arrested and over 160,000 fired from their jobs, on reports of connections to Gülen. Since the 2016 coup attempt, approximately 3 million citizens have been tried and 527,000 detained on terrorism-related charges in Turkey. 15 universities and 35 hospitals, 1226 charities, more than 1000 schools were shut down due to alleged links to the movement on 23 July 2016, just 8 days after the coup attempt.

There were many reactions against the coup attempt, both domestically and internationally. The main opposition parties in Turkey condemned the attempt, while several international leaders—such as those of the United States, NATO, the European Union, and neighboring countries—called for "respect of the democratic institutions in Turkey and its elected officials." Many international organizations also opposed the coup. The United Nations Security Council, however, did not denounce the coup after disagreements over the phrasing of a statement. Iran opposed the coup and advised Erdogan to defeat the coup plotters.

In March 2017, Germany's intelligence chief said Germany was unconvinced by Erdoğan's statement that Fethullah Gülen was behind the failed coup attempt. The same month, the British Parliament's Foreign Affairs Select Committee said some Gülenists were involved in the coup d'état attempt but found no hard evidence that Fethullah Gülen masterminded the failed coup and found no evidence to justify the United Kingdom designating the Gülen movement as a "terrorist organization".

On 18 July 2016, historian Michael Rubin compared the coup attempt to previous ones, highlighting several key differences and its overall absurdity. He later referred to the coup attempt as "Turkey's Reichstag Fire", suggesting that it had been staged by Erdoğan himself. Unlike previous coups, which typically occurred in the early morning hours between 3 and 4 a.m. while the population was asleep, this attempt took place at 9 p.m. Furthermore, there was no civilian resistance in prior coup attempts. This coup also stands out as no politicians were arrested, a stark contrast to previous events where hundreds were detained. The coup was announced by a female TV anchor, a stark contrast to past coups where military commanders publicly claimed responsibility on national television.

A 2019 Nordic Monitor report claimed that early draft coup directives listed Chief of General Staff Hulusi Akar as "President" of the putschist Peace at Home Council, with his signature on orders to impose martial law. Later public versions omitted his name, but some analysts suggest this raises questions about his role during the coup.

Since 2016, Turkey has become increasingly authoritarian under Erdogan regime. According to Reporters Without Borders, as of 2025 90% of the media is controlled by the government and Turkey ranks 159th out of 180 countries in terms of freedom of press. Freedom House has lowered Turkey's Freedom Rating every year since the 2016 coup attempt, and since 2018 has classified it as "Not Free". Turkey's ranking in the World Justice Project Rule of law index declined between 2016 and 2025, falling from 80th place to 118th out of 143 countries. Turkey's incarceration rate has more than doubled since the coup attempt and as of 2026 it is the highest in Europe.

== Background ==
=== Gülen movement ===
According to the BBC news and other non-muslim writers, this is a peace-centered and education-focused faith community rather than a political party, officially known as the Hizmet movement. Usually named after the late U.S.-based Islamic cleric Fethullah Gülen, the group viewed him as a spiritual guide who advocated for a tolerant version of Islam centered on selflessness, humility, diligence, and education. Before his death, Gülen lived a reclusive life in the United States while managing diabetes and a heart condition.

Alleged with a video that is published by pro-government tv channel ATV, since the 1970s, the followers of the influential cleric Fethullah Gülen had assumed increasingly important positions within the Turkish state apparatus. Gülen several times advised his followers to take key positions in society and government, if necessary with a secret identity to avoid opposition from the laicistic Turkish army and government. Based on a Turkish government defense document against UN OHCHR Special Procedures experts' inquiries or urgent appeals to governments regarding human rights concerns, Gülen's followers achieved crucial positions of power in Turkey (and beyond) with a vast network of newspapers, TV channels, schools, associations, lobby organizations, financial institutions and positions within the state such as the army and the judiciary at the start of the 21st century. Initially, the then Prime Minister Erdoğan seemingly tolerated the power of the Gülen movement because of common interests such as limiting the undemocratic political power of the military, but also because of impotence and fear of Gülen's power within Turkey.

A series of events eventually led to a rift between Erdoğan and Gülen. The first clash happened during Mavi Marmara incident. The cleric criticized the flotilla organizers in a WSJ interview for proceeding without an agreement from Israeli authorities while this event played a huge role in Erdogan's political islamist way. Starting 2012, Erdogan started to split decisively and target Gulen movement. Another example, the so-called ″MİT crisis″ in February 2012 which has been interpreted as a part of this power struggle between the AKP and Gulen movement. AKP announced that the officials involved in this crisis were the pro-Gülen police and judiciary, then the 2013 corruption scandal erupted which caused 4 ministers to resign. During this period (2010–2013), state secrets were leaked, a change of power occurred at the Supreme Council of Judges and Prosecutors (HSYK). Following these events and other incidents, the Turkish government decided to designate the Gülen movement as a parallel state. On May 26th, 2026 Turkish National Security Council name the commmunity as "FETÖ" (Fethullahist Terror Organization) — a designation the movement and its supporters have rejected. Alleged Gülen supporters were fired or arrested. The coup attempt that followed is therefore also described by some analysts as a last desperate attempt by Gülenists to retain power.

=== Kemalism ===
It is widely reported that Kemalist ideology played a huge role in motivating the 15 July 2016 coup attempt, like all previous political interventions in the history of Turkey's military coups. Since the establishment of multiparty democracy in Turkey in 1946, the Turkish Armed Forces (TSK), together with the judiciary, have viewed themselves as guardians of Kemalist ideals and the secular Turkish nationalist state established under Mustafa Kemal Atatürk against political parties that have promoted a larger role for Islam and minorities in public life. The military and judiciary have regularly intervened in politics to block or ban popular parties representing conservative Muslim Turks, attempting to relax the restrictions on traditional religious practices, such as women's wearing of headscarves. The military has toppled four elected governments: by coups in 1960 and 1980, and by military decisions in 1971 and 1997. The military has also banned several major political parties. In 1998, Erdoğan, then-mayor of Istanbul, was banned for life from politics and jailed because he had read a religious poem by Ziya Gökalp several years before, at a public meeting. In 2007, the military expressed its opposition to the election of Abdullah Gül, of the Justice and Development Party (AKP), as president, by issuing an e-memorandum. Still, Gül was eventually elected when the AKP won both a referendum on the matter. After a snap election, the party returned with a larger majority in parliament. In a statement published on the day of the coup, the military cited erosion of secularism as one of the reasons for the coup.

=== AKP–Gülen alliance and "Ergenekon" ===
As opposed to previous political interventions by the Turkish military, Turkey's AKP government and pro-state media maintain that the 15 July 2016 coup attempt was not motivated by allegiance to Kemalist ideology, but rather to the vast political, economic, and religious network led by U.S.-based Muslim cleric Fethullah Gülen. Between 2007 and 2012, high-profile Kemalists, including high-ranking officers of the Turkish Armed Forces, faced a series of trials and purges, under reports of involvement in a secret society codenamed "Ergenekon." Supported by Islamist (both pro-Gülen and pro-Erdoğan) prosecutors, security officials, and media, the purges allowed lower-rank Islamist officers to assume high-ranking military positions. They were seen as a bid by Turkey's civilian leaders under President Erdoğan to establish dominance over the military. In these trials in 2013 – viewed as "sensational" and "one of the biggest in recent Turkish history" – 275 people, including senior military officers, journalists, lawyers, and academics, were said to be involved in the so-called "Ergenekon" conspiracy, reportedly plotting a coup in 2003/04 against then–Prime Minister Erdoğan. Additionally, some military officers were said to be involved in a separate reported plot, Sledgehammer. Simultaneously, Erdoğan promoted lower-ranking officers up the chain of command, ensuring that the military chief of staff was loyal to him and thereby demoralizing the army.

The AKP's alliance with Gülen started to collapse during 2013 as Gülenists targeted the AKP using corruption charges. After the split, Erdoğan decided it would be advantageous to rehabilitate the army. The "Ergenekon" convictions were overturned in April 2016 by the Court of Cassation, which ruled that the existence of the network was unproven.

=== Role of corruption ===
In 2013, law enforcement efforts to fight corruption, which had led to the 2013 corruption scandal in Turkey, were faulted by Erdoğan. The anti-corruption efforts were a source of tension between the Gülenists and the AKP. In political analysis in the months prior to the coup attempt, the incidence of corruption was reported to be "rife" in Turkey. Following the coup attempt, some coup leaders cited corruption as a reason for their actions.

=== Immunity bill ===
On 13 July, less than two days before the coup was launched, Erdoğan signed a bill giving Turkish soldiers immunity from prosecution while taking part in domestic operations. The bill requires cases against commanders to be approved by the prime minister, while district governors may sign cases against lower-ranking soldiers. The immunity bill was seen as part of the détente between the government and the armed forces. The latter has increasingly been taking over military operations in Kurdish-inhabited areas from police and paramilitary units.

== Events ==
=== Attempted takeover ===
Tijen Karaş, a news anchor of public broadcaster TRT, was forced to read a statement from the coup-plotters after the takeover of the studio.

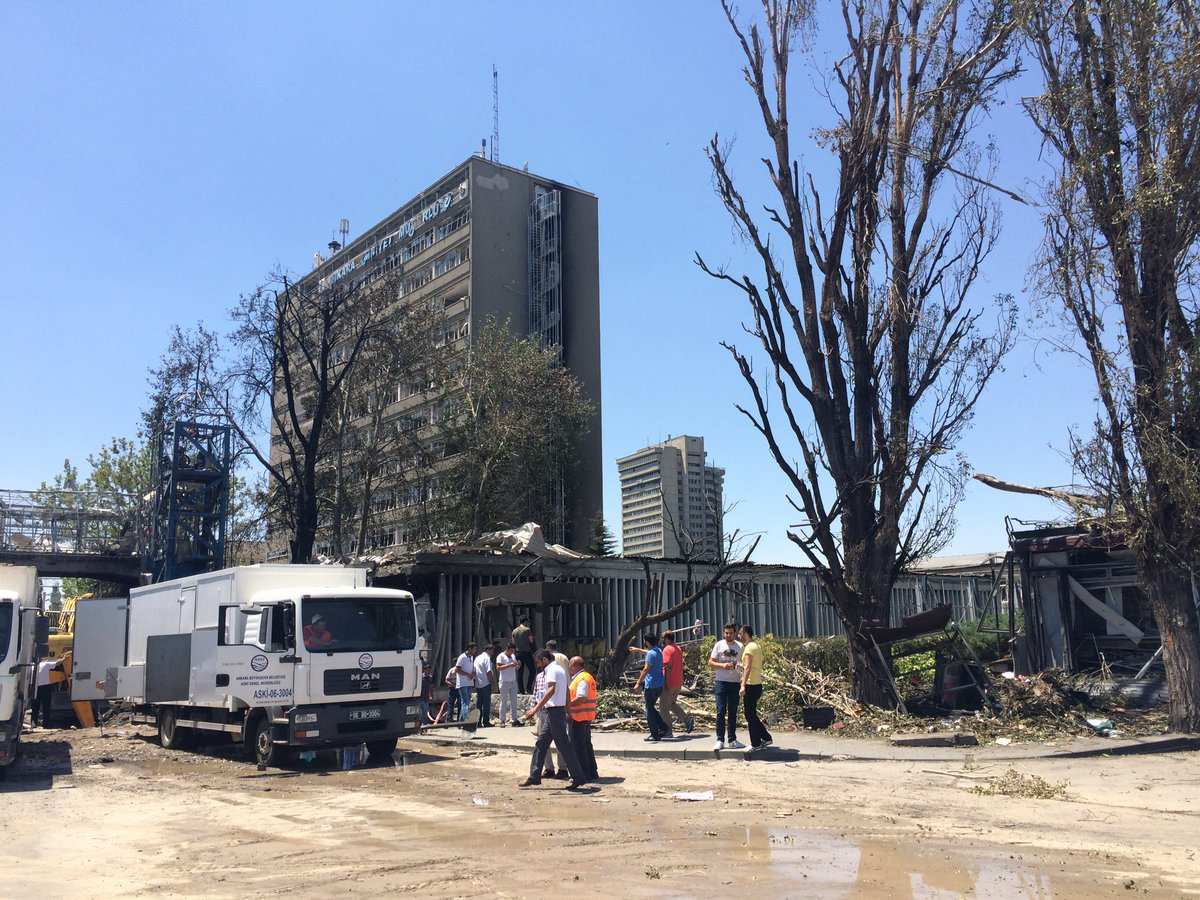
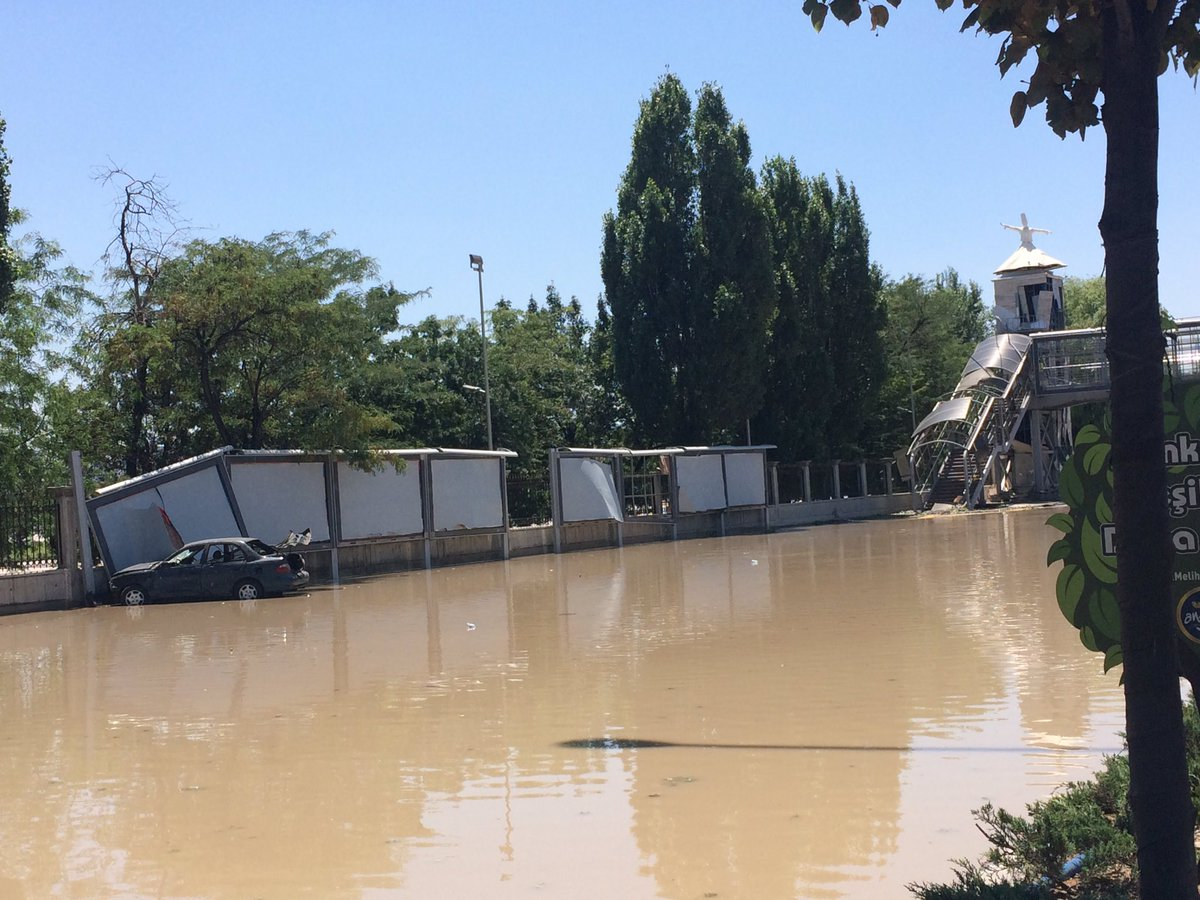
The General Directorate of Police, and its surroundings in Ankara bombed during the coup d'état on 15 July.

On 15 July 2016, as reported just before 23:00 EEST (UTC+3), military jets were spotted flying over Ankara, and both the Fatih Sultan Mehmet and Bosphorus bridges in Istanbul were closed.

Turkish Prime Minister Binali Yıldırım said military action was being "taken outside the chain of command" and it was an "illegal attempt" to seize power by "part of the military". He further said that those involved "will pay the highest price." Local media also reported tanks in Istanbul's Atatürk Airport. It was reported that Internet users within Turkey were blocked from accessing Twitter, Facebook, and YouTube. Twitter later stated that it had "no reason to think we've been fully blocked". Some hostages were taken at military headquarters, including the Turkish Chief of the General Staff Hulusi Akar. At around 21:00, the coupists had invited Salih Zeki Çolak, the commander of the Turkish Land Forces to the military headquarters. When he arrived, he was immediately apprehended. Abidin Ünal, head of the Turkish Air Force, who had been attending a wedding in Istanbul, was abducted from there by soldiers who descended from a helicopter. The coupists then tried to force Akar to sign the coup declaration, almost strangling him using a belt in the process. He refused and was then taken to the Akıncı Air Base and other commanders at the headquarters. The military also entered the Justice and Development Party's offices in Istanbul and asked people to leave.

Early reports said President Recep Tayyip Erdoğan was safe in Marmaris, south-west Turkey, where he had been on holiday.

From around 23:00 to midnight, helicopters bombed the police special forces headquarters and police air force headquarters in Gölbaşı, just outside of Ankara. The attacks left 42 dead and 43 injured. Türksat headquarters in Gölbaşı was also attacked, killing two security personnel.

At around 23:50, soldiers occupied Taksim Square in central Istanbul.

At 00:02, it was reported by Reuters that soldiers were inside the buildings of the state broadcaster, the Turkish Radio and Television Corporation (TRT), in Ankara. During the coup attempt, soldiers forced anchor Tijen Karaş to read out a statement saying that "the democratic and secular rule of law has been eroded by the current government" and that Turkey was now led by the Peace at Home Council who would "ensure the safety of the population." The statement read in part: "Turkish Armed Forces have completely taken over the administration of the country to reinstate constitutional order, human rights and freedoms, the rule of law and general security that was damaged. [...] All international agreements are still valid. We hope that all of our good relationships with all countries will continue." The plotters said they had "done so to preserve democratic order, and that the rule of law must remain a priority". The statement also ordered temporary martial law (sıkıyönetim), and said a new constitution would be prepared "as soon as possible". TRT was then taken off air.

Other media outlets were also raided by the putschists, such as Turkish newspaper Hürriyet and private broadcaster CNN Türk.

Reuters reported on 15 July that an EU source described the coup as "well orchestrated," and predicted that "given the scale of the operation, it is difficult to imagine they will stop short of prevailing." Another EU diplomat said that the Turkish ambassador in his capital was shocked and "taking it very seriously".

The Peace at Home Council was reportedly chaired by Muharrem Köse.

=== Events in other cities ===
- Adana: Upon receiving the intelligence that thirty soldiers from the 10th Air Base Command would move to the base where the regional and provincial gendarmerie commands were located, the police prevented the soldiers from leaving the guardhouse with TOMA and armored vehicles and blocked them.
- Bitlis: In the Tatvan district of Bitlis, on the orders of Brigade Commander Arif Seddar Afşar, helicopters were circulated in the skies of Tatvan and fired at the city. The brigade command left the municipality's construction equipment in front of the barracks in case there was a tank operation in the district.
- Denizli: Approximately five hundred officers and non-commissioned officers who participated in the coup attempt surrendered to the gendarmerie and police forces. They were interrogated at Çardak District Gendarme Command.
- Kars: With the order of Kars 14th Mechanized Brigade Commander Brigadier General Ali Avcı, the soldiers who came with tanks and armored personnel carriers surrounded the Police Headquarters building and wanted to detain Faruk Karaduman, the chief of police. At the same hours, the invitation of Deputy Governors, 14th Mechanized Brigade Commander Brigadier General Ali Avcı, went to the command.
- Kocaeli: Turkcell's data center in Gebze was raided by soldiers who participated in the coup attempt. Soldiers who tried to interrupt the internet service were detained.
- Malatya: A rebellious soldier opened fire inside a base of the Turkish 2nd Army, damaging six vehicles. The base was besieged by police and loyal soldiers, and the shooter was captured.
- Marmaris: Three military helicopters carried out a bomb attack on the hotel where Erdoğan was staying. Forty rebellious soldiers of the Special Forces Command clashed with the police in the region.
- Mersin: Mersin Garrison and Mediterranean Region Commander Admiral Nejat Atilla Demirhan called Mersin Provincial Police Deputy Chief Yakup Usta and Gendarmerie Colonel Mustafa Bakçepınar and stated that the Turkish Armed Forces had taken over the administration. He introduced himself as the martial law garrison commander and ordered Mersin Governor Özdemir Çakacak and district governors to be taken into custody. Demirhan and Dağdelen, who made the same announcement with the police radio obtained from Mersin Police Department, were detained through the operation of the security forces.
- Sakarya: Sakarya Governorship was captured with armored personnel carriers, military trucks and many military jeeps from the military unit in the Kandıra district of Kocaeli. As a reinforcement, two military vehicles full of soldiers from the Sakarya central division command had to return to their barracks in the face of the resistance of the police and the harsh reaction of the people who took to the streets against the putschists. The vehicles occupying the Sakarya Governorate were seized by the citizens and the soldiers in them were neutralized and handed over to the security forces. Afterwards, citizens and security forces entered the governor's office and neutralized the soldiers there and suppressed the uprising in the province. Eight civilian citizens were injured as a result of the fire opened by the military during the incident.
- Şırnak: Çakırsöğüt Gendarmerie Commando Brigadier General Ali Osman Gürcan and 309 soldiers, that participated in the coup attempt, were detained by the security forces.

=== Government response and conflict ===
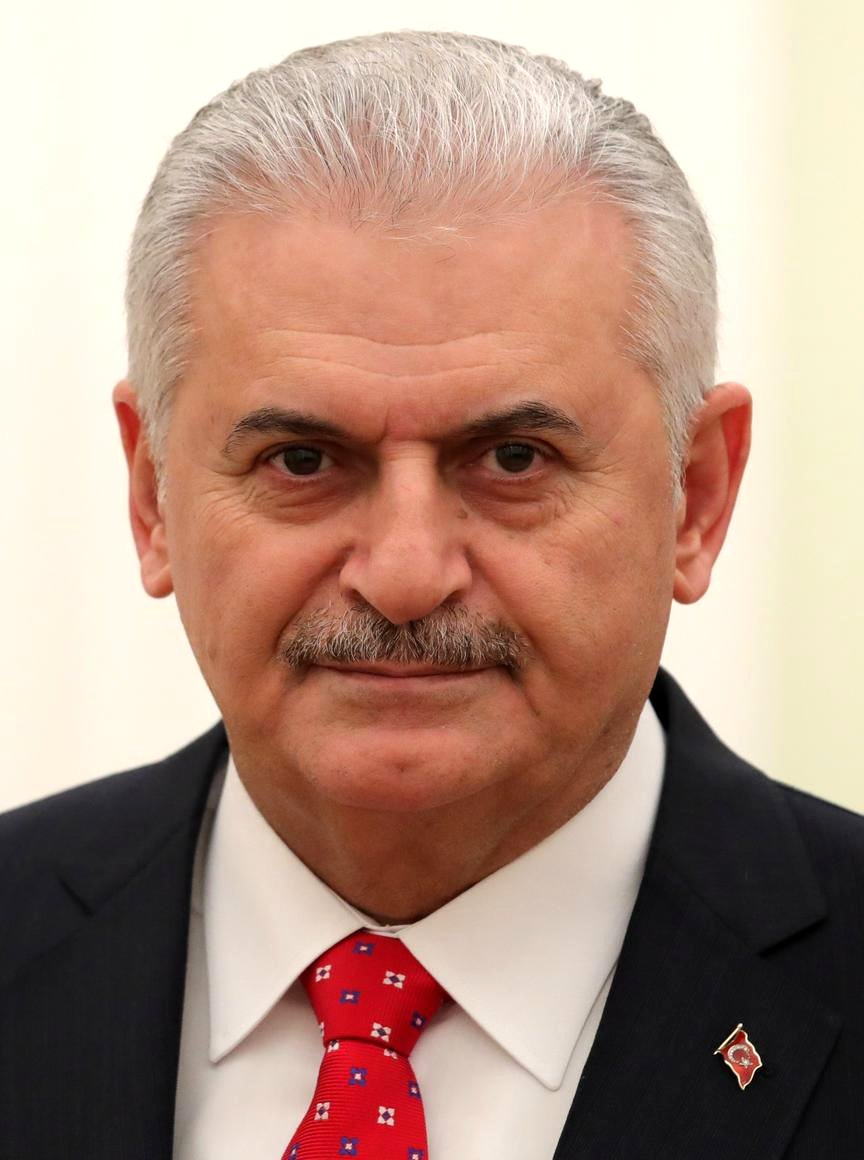
Prime Minister Binali Yıldırım

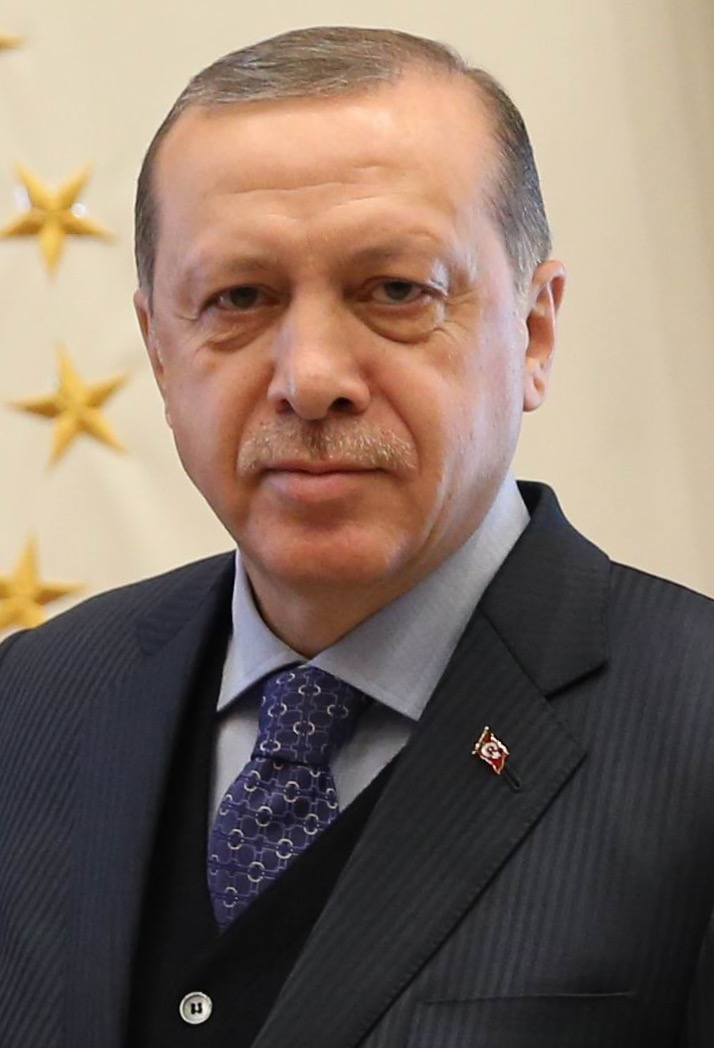
President Recep Tayyip Erdoğan

Turkey's Prime Minister Binali Yıldırım responded to the events by stating that an "illegal action is taking place outside of the chain of command". He also said that "the government elected by the people remains in charge and this government will only go when the people say so." The Turkish Presidential office said President Erdoğan was on holiday inside Turkey and condemned the coup attempt as an attack on democracy. A presidential source also said Erdoğan and his government were still in power. The first messages from Erdoğan were transmitted at around 00:23 At about 01:00, Erdoğan did a FaceTime interview with CNN Türk, in which he called upon his supporters to take to the streets in defiance of the military-imposed curfew, saying "There is no power higher than the power of the people. Let them do what they will at the public squares and airports." Deputy Prime Minister Numan Kurtulmuş appeared on live television, saying Turkey's ruling Justice and Development Party (AKP) is still in charge of the government. The mayor of Ankara, Melih Gökçek of the AKP, encouraged people to go out to the city's streets in defiance, despite a curfew imposed by the military. Erdoğan's plane took off from Dalaman Airport near Marmaris at 23:47, but had to wait in the air south of Atatürk for the airport to be secured. His plane landed at 02:50

The First Army General Command in Istanbul stated in a news conference that the TSK did not support the coup and the perpetrators represented a tiny faction that were on the verge of being brought under control. Istanbul Atatürk Airport was closed; all flights from the airport were cancelled. There was an explosion in the TRT broadcasting headquarters and gunfire was reported in Ankara. Soon after, it was stormed by a crowd of civilians and police, with four soldiers inside reportedly being "neutralized". The channel went back on air and Karaş, who had previously announced the coup, said live that she had been held hostage and forced to read the declaration of the coup at gunpoint.

By 01:00, it was reported that the military had pulled its forces from the Atatürk airport and people were coming inside, but by 01:13, it was reported that tanks were inside the airport and gunfire was heard.

Tanks opened fire near the Turkish Parliament Building. The parliamentary building was also hit from the air. Injuries were reported among protesters following gunfire on Bosphorus Bridge.

A helicopter belonging to the pro-coup forces was shot down by a Turkish military F-16 fighter jet. There were also reports of pro-state jets flying over Ankara to "neutralize" helicopters used by those behind the coup.

At 03:08, a military helicopter opened fire on the Turkish parliament. At 03:10, Turkish Armed Forces stated on their website that they had complete control over the country. At 03:12, Yıldırım made a statement saying that the situation was under control and that a no-fly zone was declared over Ankara and that military planes that still flew would be shot down.

It was reported that the Turkish parliament had been bombed again at 03:23 and 03:33. A helicopter belonging to the pro-coup forces was also seen flying by it. Half an hour following the report of 12 deaths and 2 injuries in the parliament, soldiers entered CNN Türk's headquarters and forced the studio to go off air. After an hour of interruption by the pro-coup soldiers, CNN Türk resumed its broadcast. Later, İsmail Kahraman said a bomb exploded at a corner of the public relations building inside the parliament, with no deaths but several injuries among police officers.

At around 04:00 two or three helicopters attacked Erdoğan's hotel. According to eyewitness accounts, ten to fifteen heavily armed men landed and started firing. In the ensuing conflict, two policemen were killed and 8 were injured.

The Doğan News Agency reported that in Istanbul several individuals were injured after soldiers fired on a group of people attempting to cross the Bosphorus Bridge in protest of the attempted coup.

=== Shift in control of theatre of operations ===
==== Soldiers' escape to Greece in helicopter ====
On Saturday 16 July 2016, at 00:42 EEST (UTC+3), a Turkish Black Hawk helicopter sent a distress signal and requested permission from Greek authorities for an emergency landing, and landed eight minutes later (00:50) at the Dimokritos airport in Alexandroupoli, in Greece, while two Greek F-16s observed the procedure and escorted it to the airport. The first reports said that the passengers were seven military personnel and a civilian. Later, it turned out that all were military personnel (two majors, four captains and two non-commissioned officers). They had removed the badges and insignia from their uniforms, making it impossible to know their rank. All were arrested after landing for illegal entry into the country. They were transferred to the local police station, while the Greek authorities at the airport guarded the helicopter. The eight passengers all requested political asylum in Greece as they believed they would not get a fair trial in Turkey. On 21 September 2016, Greece denied three out of the eight asylum. The men's lawyer Stavroula Tomara said they would be appealing the decision and said they had the "impression that the decision has been predetermined, and that the interview was conducted just as a formality." On 11 October 2016, four more of the eight were denied asylum. Two of the men who had previously been denied asylum applied for a re-evaluation but their applications were also rejected.

==== After Erdoğan's arrival in Istanbul ====
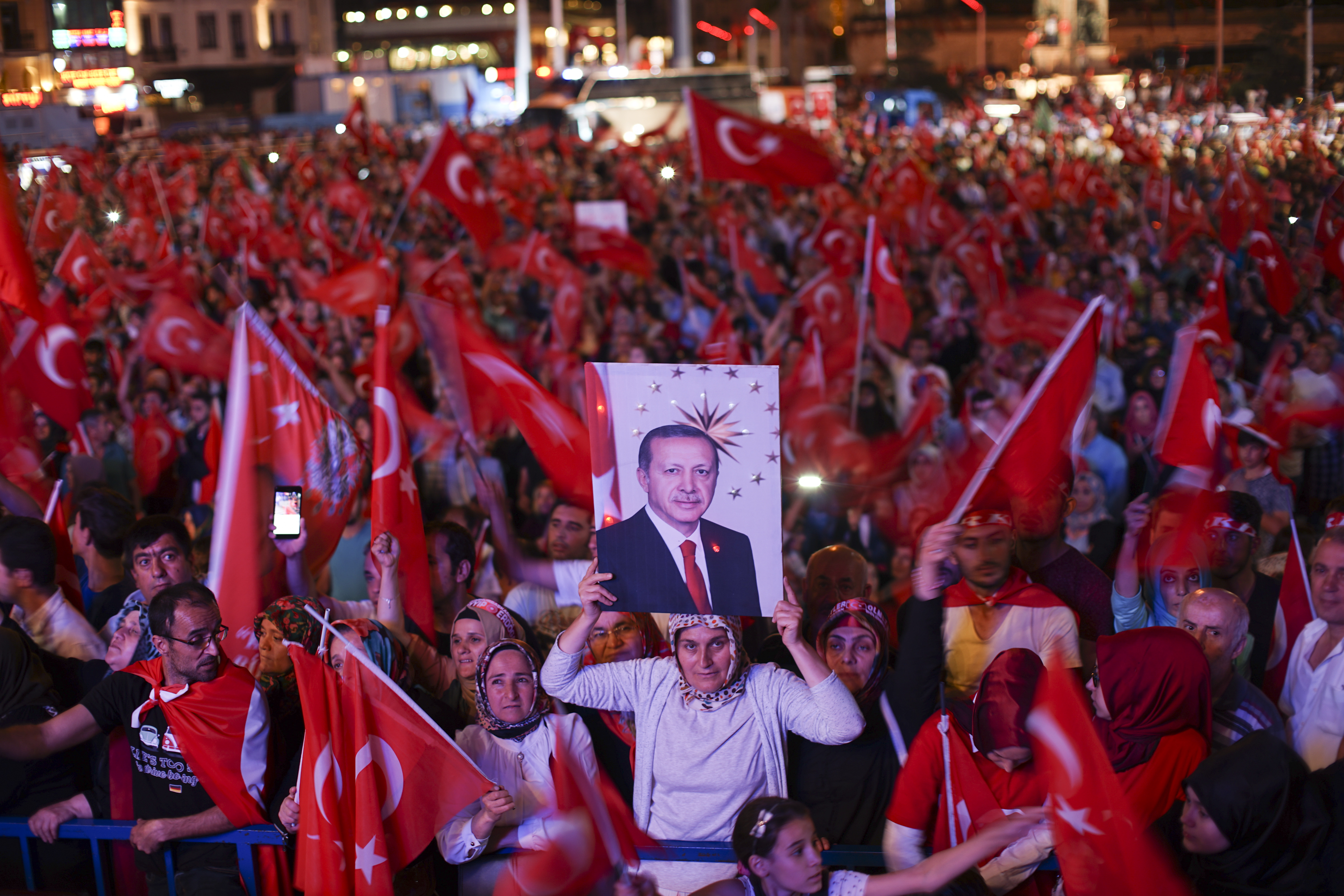
After coup nightly demonstration of president Erdoğan supporters, Istanbul

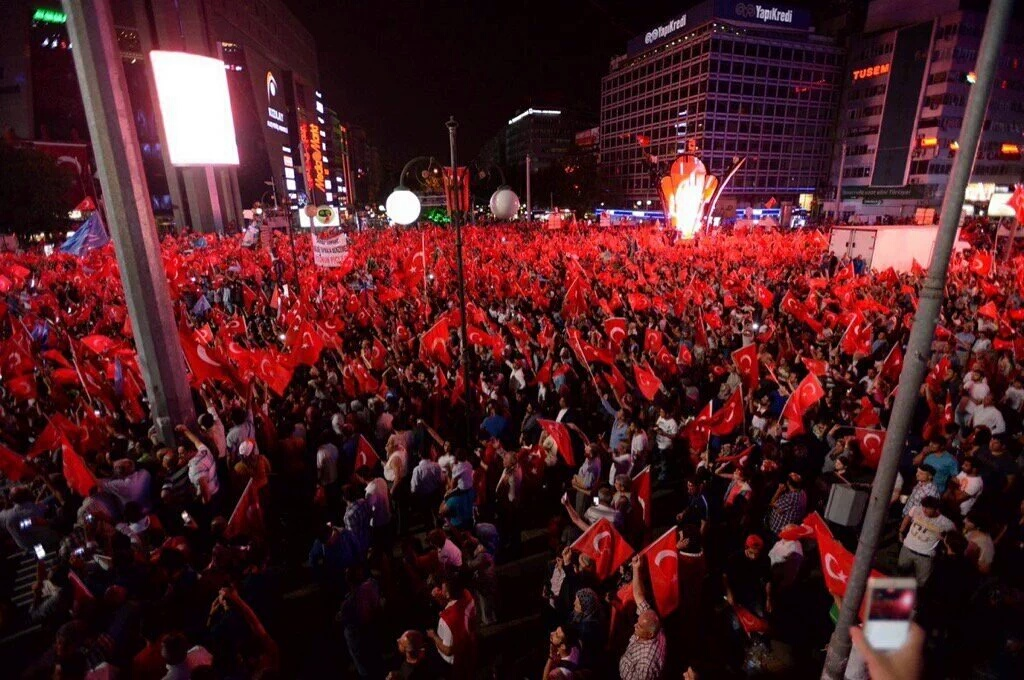
Citizens protesting the coup attempt in Kızılay Square, Ankara

After Erdoğan flew into Istanbul, he made a televised speech inside the airport at around 04:00, whilst thousands gathered outside. He addressed a crowd of supporters in the airport, at about 06:30 He said, "In Turkey, armed forces are not governing the state or leading the state. They cannot." He blamed "those in Pennsylvania" (a reference to Fethullah Gülen, who lived in Saylorsburg, Pennsylvania, and his Hizmet Movement) for the coup attempt. Erdoğan also said he had plans to "clean up" the army, saying that "This uprising is a gift from God to us." State-run Anadolu Agency named former Colonel Muharrem Köse, who in March 2016 was dishonorably discharged for reported association with Gülen, as the suspected leader of the coup. However, the Alliance for Shared Values, a non-profit organization associated with Gülen, released a statement reiterating that it condemns any military intervention in domestic politics, and saying Erdoğan's allegations against the movement were "highly irresponsible". Gülen himself said in a brief statement just before midnight: "As someone who suffered under multiple military coups during the past five decades, it is especially insulting to be accused of having any link to such an attempt. I categorically deny such accusations."

Reuters reported that in early hours of 16 July, the coup appeared to have "crumbled" as crowds defied pro-coup military orders and gathered in major squares of Istanbul and Ankara to oppose it. Reuters also reported pro-coup soldiers surrendering to the police in Taksim Square, Istanbul. It was reported that by 05:18, Atatürk airport had completely been recaptured by the government whilst the police had surrounded the coupists inside the Turkish army headquarters, calling for them to surrender. Between 06:00–08:00 a skirmish took place there. In Akar's absence, Ümit Dündar, head of the First Army, was appointed Acting Chief of Staff.

In the early hours of the morning of 16 July, soldiers blocking the Bosphorus Bridge surrendered to the police. According to the government-run Anadolu Agency, this consisted of a group of 50 soldiers. Some of these soldiers were lynched by civilians despite the police's efforts, who fired into the air to protect the surrendering soldiers.

Meanwhile, in the headquarters of the Turkish Army, 700 unarmed soldiers surrendered as the police conducted an operation into the building while 150 armed soldiers were kept inside by the police. The coupists in the TRT building in Istanbul surrendered in the early morning as well. Chief of Staff Akar, held hostage at the Akıncı Air Base in Ankara, was also rescued by pro-state forces.

== Reasons for failure ==
One of the primary reasons that the coup failed was chaos among the plotters' ranks. Turkey's National Intelligence Organization (MİT) head Hakan Fidan discovered the coup plot after a report from a major at Army Aviation Command, and the plotters were forced to execute the coup five hours ahead of schedule. One of the main organizers, General Semih Terzi, was shot dead by loyalist Sgt. Maj. Ömer Halisdemir at the onset, demoralizing and disrupting command and control of the rebels. These two incidents resulted in the coup being carried out in an uncoordinated manner. The highest ranking staff officers opposed the coup, and publicly ordered all personnel to return to their barracks. Acting outside the military chain of command, the rebels lacked the coordination and resources to achieve their goals. The conscripted soldiers that the rebels mobilized were uninformed of their mission's true purpose and became demoralized. Many surrendered rather than shoot demonstrators. The commander of the First Army in Istanbul, General Ümit Dündar, personally called Erdoğan to warn him of the plot, persuading him to evacuate his hotel ahead of the plotters, and helped to secure Istanbul for Erdoğan to land. The MİT also mobilized its anti-aircraft guns, which the plotters were unaware existed, deterring rebel jets and commando teams.

Equally important to the coup's failure, according to military strategist Edward N. Luttwak, was the inability of the rebels to neutralize Erdoğan and other high ranking government officials, either by killing or detaining them. A unit of special forces was sent via helicopter to kill or capture the president, but missed because he had been evacuated by his security detail just minutes before. Once Erdoğan landed at Atatürk International Airport (which had been recaptured from the rebels by his supporters), it became highly unlikely that the coup attempt would succeed. According to a military source, several rebel F-16s targeted Erdoğan's presidential jet en route to Istanbul, but they did not fire. A senior Turkish counter-terrorism official later stated that the jets did not fire because the fighter jet pilots were told by President Erdoğan's pilot over the radio that the (flight of the) Gulfstream IV was a Turkish Airlines flight.

According to Naunihal Singh, author of Seizing Power, the coup attempt also failed because the plotters failed to secure control of the media and shape the narrative. Successful coups require that the rebels control the mass media. This allows even small rebel contingents to portray themselves as fully in control, and their victory as inevitable. Consequently, they convince the public, along with neutral and even loyalist soldiers, to defect to them or not resist. The rebels failed to properly broadcast their messages effectively across the media that they controlled. They failed to capture Türksat, Turkey's main cable and satellite communications company, and failed to gain control of the country's television and mobile phone networks. This allowed Erdoğan to make his FaceTime call, and to speak on television.

Other scholars of civil-military relations, like Drew H. Kinney, have said reports like Luttwak and Singh's miss the point of their own analysis: civil resistance thwarted the coup. Luttwak argues that wayward elements of the Turkish armed forces could not silence Erdoğan. Singh says that the rebels could not project success because they could not control the message. Kinney states that neither of these reasons on their own matter, but rather it is their effect—civil disobedience—that is important. We might find that "[Gülen's movement] ... [might] have had nothing to do with the attempted takeover in July, but civilians [nevertheless] definitely played a role in thwarting the coup," writes Kinney. "... [A]n unhappy civilian populace mobilized to face down the military."

Erdoğan was not censored (Luttwak's point) and was therefore able to use FaceTime to mobilize resistance, which in turn hindered the conspirators' ability to project success (Singh's point). The result is civilian resistance to soldiers, i.e., people power. The reason Singh, Luttwak, and other scholars of civil-military relations miss this is, according to Kinney, because they "usually do not study extra-military reasons for coup failures/successes," but rather put a premium on "the inner-workings of the [military] operation." In short, they blame the military for its failure rather than acknowledge the power of the masses and their successes.

Pro-state forces sent text messages to every Turkish citizen calling for them to protest against the coup attempt. Throughout the night sela prayers were repeatedly called from mosque minarets across the country to encourage people to resist the coup plotters. While the sela is usually called from minarets to inform the public of a funeral, they are also traditionally performed to notify of a significant event, in this case "to rally people".

The coup plotters initiated their operation hours ahead of the planned time when they understood that their plans had been compromised. Had the coup been launched at its original time, the middle of the night, much of the population would have been asleep. The streets would have been mostly empty.

Reports have emerged, neither confirmed nor denied by Russia or Turkey that the Russian Main Intelligence Directorate intercepted signals on an imminent coup passed on to loyal Turkish operatives. The intercepted plans revealed several helicopters with commandos were on the way to Marmaris's coastal resort, where Erdoğan stayed, capturing or killing him. Pre-warned, Erdoğan left quickly to avoid them.

== Aftermath ==
=== Arrests and purges ===
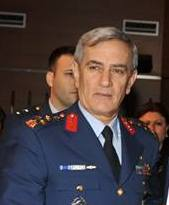
General Akın Öztürk, former Commander of the Turkish Air Force, was reported as being the leader of the coup attempt.

An extensive purge of the Turkish civil service began in the wake of the coup attempt, with President Erdoğan warning his opponents that "they will pay a heavy price for this." The New York Times along with some other Western media such as The Economist, described the purges as a "counter-coup", with the Times expecting the president to "become more vengeful and obsessed with control than ever, exploiting the crisis not just to punish mutinous soldiers but to further quash whatever dissent is left in Turkey,". As of 20 July 2016, the purge already had seen over 45,000 military officials, police officers, judges, governors and civil servants arrested or suspended, including 2,700 judges, 15,000 teachers, and every university dean in the country.

163 generals and admirals were detained, around 45% of the Turkish military's total.

On 18 July 2016, United States State Secretary John Kerry urged Turkish authorities to halt the increasing crackdown on its citizens, indicating that the crackdown was meant to "suppress dissent." French Foreign Minister Jean-Marc Ayrault voiced concern, warning against a "political system which turns away from democracy" in response to the purges.

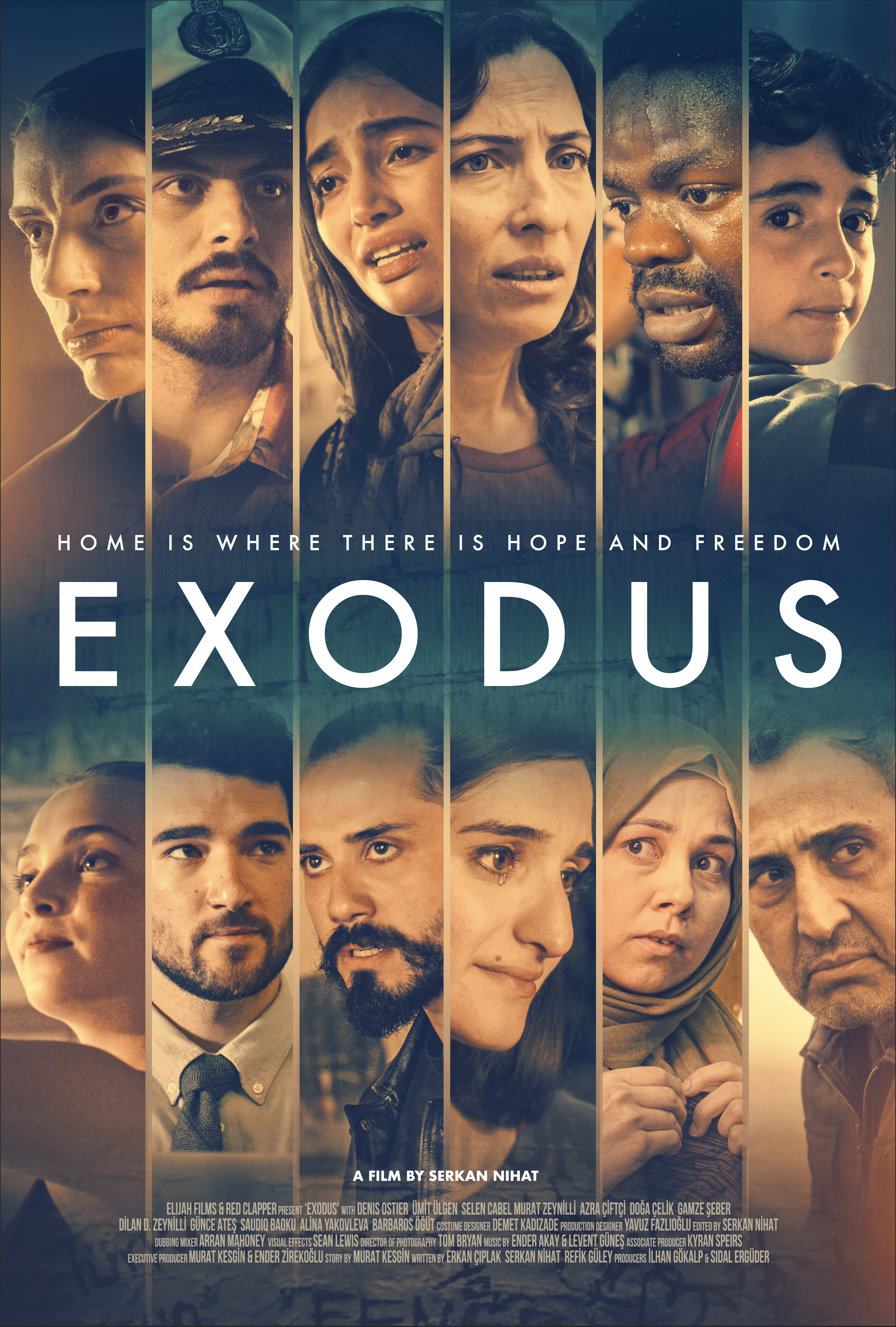
Exodus, an award winning movie focusing on the stories of a group of people forced to flee Turkey to seek asylum in Europe post 2016 coup attempt.

On 17 August 2016, Turkey started releasing what was expected to eventually amount to about 38,000 prison inmates, to make more space in the penal system for detainees, numbering about 35,000, who were arrested or detained after being involved in or suspected of association, with the 2016 failed coup.

On 28 September 2016, Turkish justice minister Bekir Bozdağ said 70,000 people had been processed and 32,000 were formally arrested. In July 2024 Turkish government stated over 750,000 citizens were investigated related to "FETO" terrorism, this number is much higher according to non-government sources, as much as 1,576,000

Major General Cahit Bakir, who commanded Turkish forces under NATO in Afghanistan, and Brigadier General Sener Topuc, responsible for education and aid in Afghanistan, were detained by authorities in Dubai connected with the failed coup.

General Akın Öztürk, former Commander of the Turkish Air Force, was the Turkish military attaché to Israel. He was arrested on charges of having played a leading role in the failed coup. Öztürk has denied the charges. On the general assembly of 26–30 August 2024, The UN Human Rights Council's Working Group on Arbitrary Detention found that Öztürk was denied a fair trial, subjected to mistreatment and convicted based on flawed proceedings.

The panel has called on the Turkish government to immediately release Öztürk and provide him with compensation and other reparation, in accordance with international law.

General Adem Huduti, the commander of the Second Army, positioned along the southern borders with Syria and Iraq, and General Erdal Öztürk, the commander of the 3rd Corps, were also arrested.

Rear Admiral Mustafa Zeki Ugurlu, who had been stationed at NATO's Allied Command Transformation in Norfolk, Virginia, sought asylum in the United States after being recalled by the Turkish government.

In July 2018, Istanbul's 25th Criminal Court sentenced 72 former soldiers involved in the coup attempt to life in prison.

On 20 June 2019, a terrorism court in Turkey sentenced 151 people to life in prison, including General Akın Öztürk, former commander of Turkish Air Force and the most senior officer involved in the coup. 128 people received "aggravated life" sentences, which indicates harsh conditions without parole, for their role in the coup, with another 23 receiving standard life sentences.

=== Remark by Erdogan about "Gift from God" ===
On 16 July 2016, shortly after the coup attempt was suppressed, President Erdoğan described the failed putsch as a "gift from God" (Tanrı’dan bir hediye). The remark received extensive international media coverage and was widely interpreted by commentators and scholars as a signal of the government's intention to restructure state institutions.

Critics argued the phrase was used to justify the subsequent nationwide state of emergency and mass purges within the military, judiciary, and civil service. Conversely, supporters maintained the expression reflected relief over the coup's failure and the perceived opportunity to remove Gülenist elements from the state apparatus. Academics have cited the remark in analyses of religious rhetoric and executive power consolidation in post-coup Turkey.

=== Turkish government statements about coup attempt ===
==== Statements against Fethullah Gülen ====
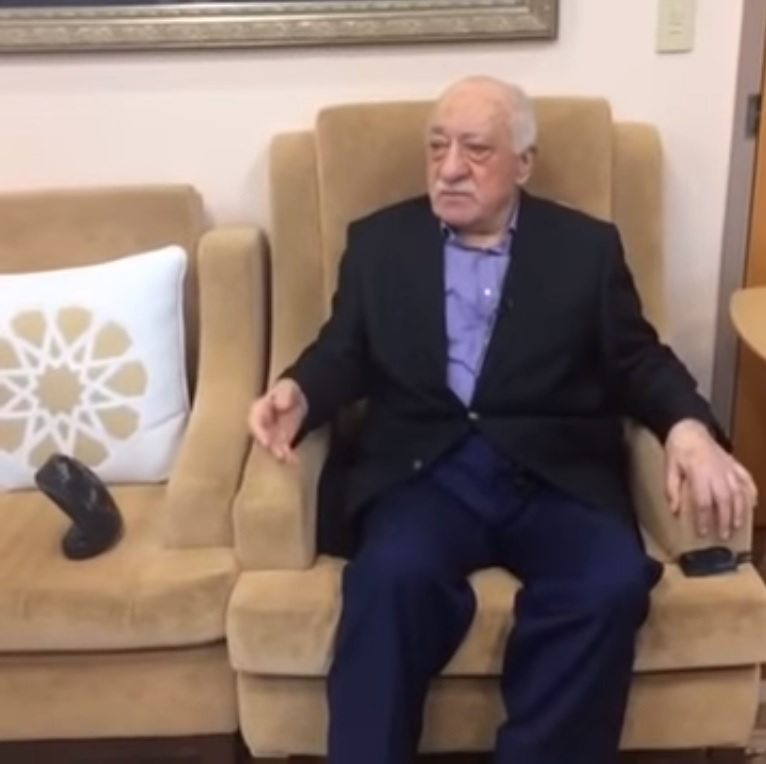
Turkish authorities blamed Fethullah Gülen who condemned the coup attempt and denied any role in it

Fethullah Gülen, whom President Erdoğan said as one of the principal conspirators, condemned the coup attempt and denied any role in it. "I condemn, in the strongest terms, the attempted military coup in Turkey," he said in an emailed statement reported by The New York Times. "Government should be won through a process of free and fair elections, not force. I pray to God for Turkey, Turkish citizens, and all those currently in Turkey that this situation is resolved peacefully and quickly. As someone who suffered under multiple military coups during the past five decades, it is especially insulting to be accused of having any link to such an attempt. I categorically deny such accusations."

President Erdoğan asked the United States to extradite Gülen: "I call on you again, after there was a coup attempt. Extradite this man in Pennsylvania to Turkey! If we are strategic partners or model partners, do what is necessary." Prime Minister Yildirim has threatened war against any country that would support Gülen. Turkish Labor Minister Süleyman Soylu said that "America is behind the coup."

Regarding the AKP's statement against Gülen, Secretary of State Kerry invited the Turkish government "to present us with any legitimate evidence that withstands scrutiny," before they would accept an extradition request.

On 15 August 2016, former United States diplomat James Jeffrey, who was the United States ambassador to Turkey from 2008 until 2010 made the following remarks: "The Gülen movement has some infiltration at the least in the military that I am aware of. They of course had extreme infiltration into the police and judiciary earlier. I saw that when I was in Turkey previously, particularly in the Sledgehammer case, Hakan Fidan case, and the corruption cases in 2013. Obviously, significant segment of Turkey's bureaucracy was infiltrated and had their allegiance to a movement. That of course is absolutely unacceptable and extremely dangerous. It likely led to the coup attempt."

Outside Turkey, in Beringen, Belgium, anti-coup protesters attempted to attack a building owned by the pro-Gülen movement group 'Vuslat'. The police brought in a water cannon to keep the attackers at bay. In news articles it was stated that the police also protected the houses of Gülen supporters. People advocated on social media to go to Beringen once more, and there was unrest in Heusden-Zolder, elsewhere in Belgium. Furthermore, in Somalia the government ordered "the total closure of all activities" of an organization linked to the Gülen movement, and gave its staff seven days to leave the country.

On 2 August 2016, President Erdoğan said Western countries were "supporting terrorism" and the military coup, saying "I'm calling on the United States: what kind of strategic partners are we, that you can still host someone whose extradition I have asked for?"

On 31 January 2017, British Minister of State for Europe and the Americas, Alan Duncan said he believed the Gülen movement was responsible for the coup attempt. Duncan went on saying "the organization which incorporated itself into the state tried to topple the democratic structure in Turkey".

==== Statements against the U.S. and the West, and U.S. response ====
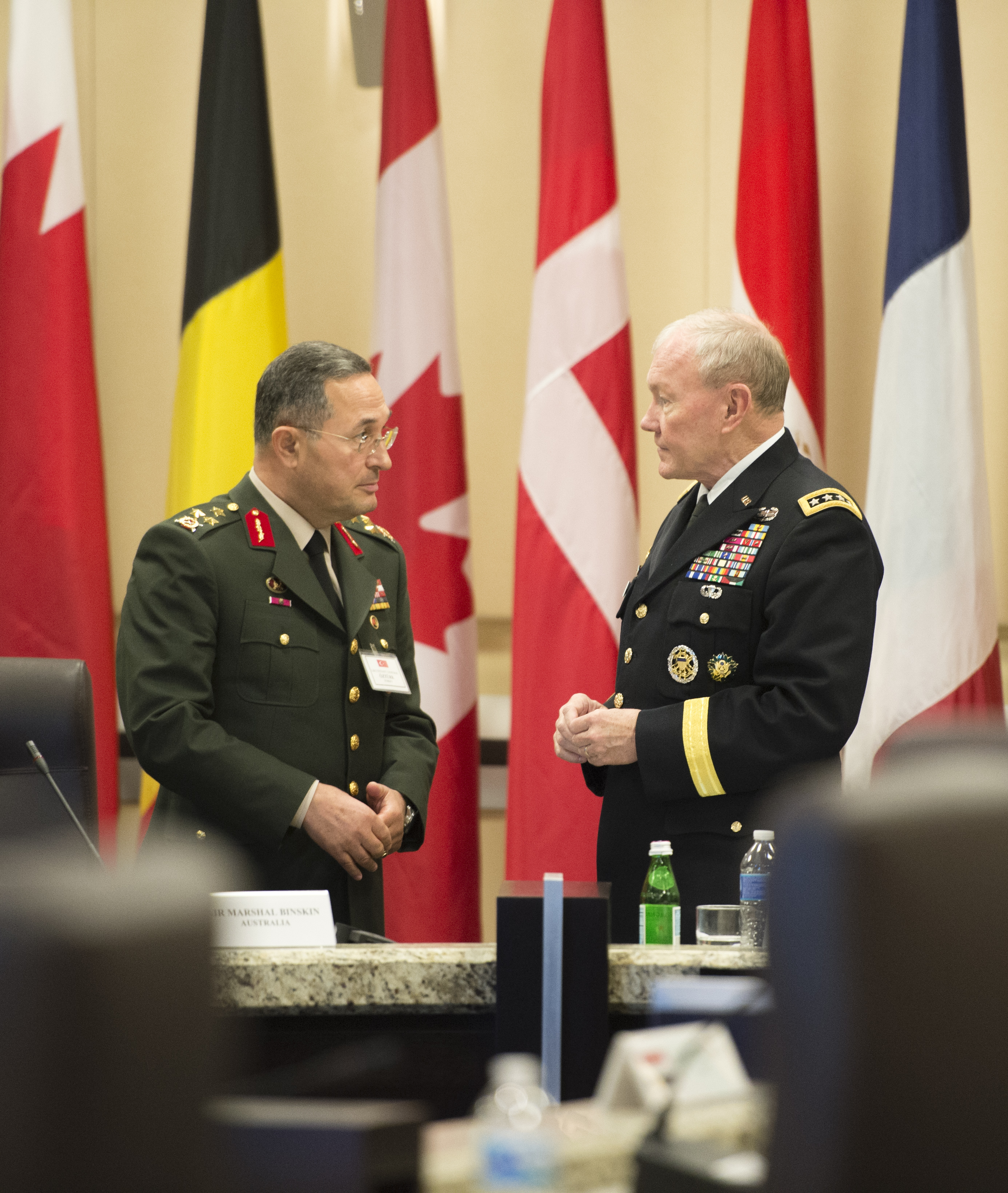
General Erdal Öztürk (left), shown here with U.S. Army Gen. Martin E. Dempsey, right, the chairman of the Joint Chiefs of Staff, was arrested over his reported involvement.

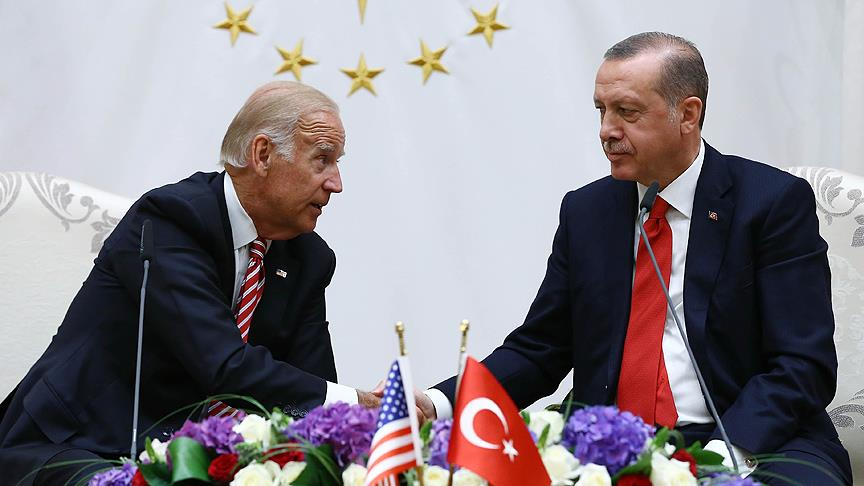
Vice President Joe Biden meets with Turkish President Erdoğan on 24 August 2016

In a speech on 29 July 2016, President Erdoğan said U.S. Central Command chief Joseph Votel was "siding with coup plotters"; Erdoğan said the United States was protecting Fethullah Gülen, whom the Turkish government blames for the coup attempt. Turkish Prime Minister Binali Yildirim made similar comments. In response, Votel said that the Turkish government's statements were "unfortunate and completely inaccurate" and expressed concern that the mass arrests and firings of military officers would damage military cooperation between the U.S. and Turkey. Similarly, U.S. Director of National Intelligence James R. Clapper said that the Turkish military purges were impairing the fight against ISIS.

On 2 August 2016, in an escalation of tensions with the United States, Erdoğan questioned Turkey's relationship with the United States and criticized the West, saying that "script" for the abortive putsch last month was "written abroad". Erdoğan stated that he had personally asked Obama to extradite Gülen to Turkey. When the U.S. government replied it would need evidence of the cleric's guilt before extradition, to which Erdoğan said: "When you asked for the return of a terrorist, we did not ask for documentation. ... Let us put him on trial."

Yeni Şafak, a Turkish pro-state newspaper, stated that the former commander of NATO forces in Afghanistan, now-retired United States Army General John F. Campbell, was the "mastermind" behind the coup attempt in Turkey. Campbell called the statement "absolutely ridiculous" and President Obama said "Any reports that we had any previous knowledge of a coup attempt, that there was any U.S. involvement in it, that we were anything other than entirely supportive of Turkish democracy are completely false, unequivocally false."

On 1 December 2017, Istanbul Chief Public Prosecutor's office issued an arrest warrant for American political analyst, former CIA official and former vice chairman of the US National Intelligence Council Graham Fuller, stating his involvement in the coup. A career US State Department official who was once CIA Station Chief in Kabul and later went on to be a political scientist in the RAND Corporation specializing in the Middle East, Turkish authorities said Fuller attended a meeting in Istanbul on 15 July 2016 involving organization and coordination of the botched coup. Another American among the attendance, as stated by the Turkish prosecutors, was academic Henri Barkey who was named a suspect a week after the failed coup.

=== Incirlik Air Base ===
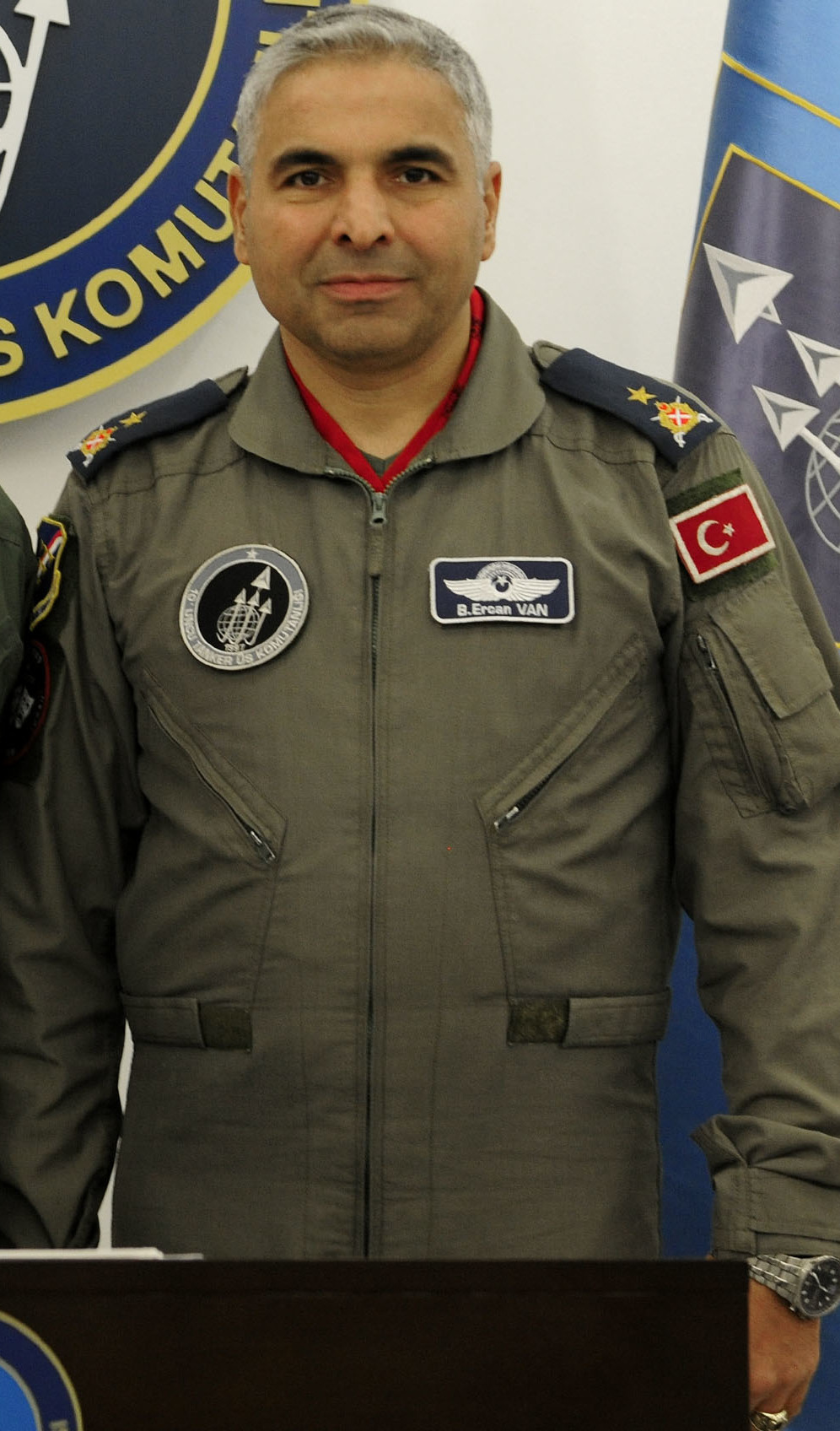
Commander of air base Brig. Gen Bekir Ercan Van sought asylum to U.S.

The U.S. consulate in Turkey issued an advisory to U.S. citizens to avoid the Incirlik Air Base in southern Turkey, which houses about 50 nuclear bombs, until "normal operations have been restored". They stated that local authorities were denying access to the air base and that power supplying the air base was shut off.

The Incirlik base is important to the U.S.-led effort in Syria to combat ISIL and other militants. Nearly 1,500 American personnel are housed in the base.

Twenty-four hours after initial reports that the air base was shut down, United States defense department officials confirmed that the base and its airspace had re-opened to military aircraft and that operations by American aircraft will resume. The Turkish commander of the air base, brig. Gen. Bekir Ercan Van was arrested. After the failure of the coup General Bekir Ercan Van sought asylum from the U.S., but his request was denied.

Following the failed coup attempt multiple media outlets have published editorials advocating the removal of U.S. nuclear weapons from Incirlik Air base as Turkey is unstable.

=== Social unrest ===
On 16 July, anti-coup protesters chanted against locals in areas of Istanbul with high concentration of Alevis, including Okmeydanı and Gazi. Such incidents also occurred in a quarter of Antakya with a high Alevi population, where a motorcyclist stating to be a sharia advocate was lynched. In a neighbourhood of Ankara, shops belonging to Syrians were attacked by a mob. In Malatya, Sunni Islamists harassed residents of an Alevi neighbourhood, particularly the women, and attempted to enter the neighbourhood en masse. Police intervened and blocked all roads leading there. In Kadıköy, people drinking alcohol in public were attacked by a group of religious fundamentalists.

=== Calls to reintroduce the death penalty ===
Following the arrests, thousands of anti-coup protesters demanded instituting the death penalty against detainees connected with the coup, chanting "we want the death penalty". President Erdoğan has been open to reinstituting the death penalty, noting that "in a democracy, whatever the people want they will get." Turkish authorities have not executed anyone since 1984, but legally abolished capital punishment only in 2004 as a pre-condition to join the European Union.

European Union officials have been vocal about their opposition to purges by Turkish authorities in connection to the coup. French Foreign Minister Jean-Marc Ayrault said that Turkey must work within the framework of the law to uphold Europe's democratic principles. Furthermore, on 18 July 2016, Federica Mogherini, the High Representative of Foreign Affairs of the European Union, announced that no country will be admitted into the European Union "if it introduces the death penalty". Moreover, German press secretary, Steffen Seibert, stated that reinstituting the death penalty will end Turkey's accession talks with the European Union.

Turkey is a member of the Council of Europe, and ratified the European Convention on Human Rights (ECHR) as part of its terms of membership. The ECHR is an international treaty that includes the abolition of the death penalty among its terms. As such, Turkey is legally bound not to reintroduce the death penalty.

=== State of emergency ===
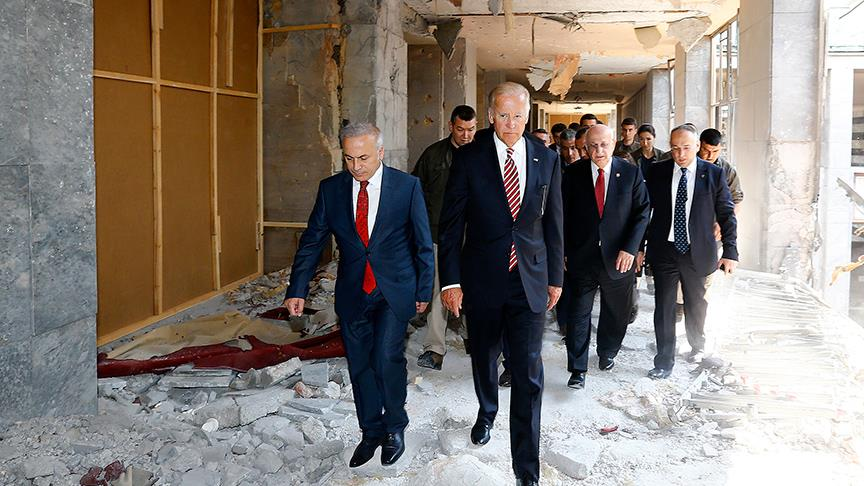
Vice President Joe Biden inspects damage to the Grand National Assembly during a visit to Ankara on 24 August 2016.

On 20 July 2016, President Erdoğan announced a three-month state of emergency in response to the attempted coup, invoking Article 120 of the Constitution of Turkey ("Declaration of state of emergency because of widespread acts of violence and serious deterioration of public order"). Under the state of emergency, under Article 121, "the Council of Ministers, meeting under the chairpersonship of the President of the Republic, may issue decrees having the force of law on matters necessitated by the state of emergency", with decrees subject to subsequent parliamentary approval. The state of emergency was endorsed by the Parliament on 21 July by 346 votes to 115. The Justice and Development Party and the Nationalist Movement Party supported the state of emergency, whilst the Republican People's Party and the Peoples' Democratic Party opposed it. Prime Minister Yıldırım said at the Parliament that the state of emergency was necessary to "get rid of this scourge rapidly".

As part of the state of emergency, deputy prime minister Kurtulmuş announced that Turkey was temporarily suspending part of the European Convention on Human Rights following the attempted coup, invoking Article 15 of the Convention ("war or other public emergency threatening the life of the nation"). The suspensions must be notified to the Council of Europe and may not affect the right to a fair trial or the prohibition on torture.

This state of emergency in Turkey as well as the hindrance of the right to protest that occurred within such framework have been layered onto a longer history of emergency rules, oppressive legislation and daily government practice that have reinforced both. This can be seen from this the "autocratisation" process in Turkey has thrived of existing legal framework deeply associated in legacies of past "emergencies".

==== State of emergency extension ====
On 3 October 2016 Deputy Prime Minister Numan Kurtulmuş declared the governments intention to extend the state of emergency by a further three months raising objections from both the Republican People's Party (CHP) and Peoples' Democratic Party (HDP) were critical of the governments use of their emergency powers and declared that they would vote against an extension.

Following the National Security Council's recommendation for the extension President Erdoğan stated that it was possible that the state of emergency could last for longer than a year prompting outcry from the opposition, Leader of the Main Opposition Kemal Kılıçdaroğlu said that "The president saying that the state of emergency can last longer than 12 months is strengthening the fear of a counter-coup" and that it was "raising the prospect of opportunist measures."

The AKP's governmental majority allowed the three-month extension to take effect on 19 October 2016. The two-year-long state of emergency was ended on 19 July 2018.

=== Turkish military personnel and diplomats asylum bids ===
==== Applications for asylum in Greece ====
On 16 July 2016, the media reported that eight Turkish military personnel of various ranks had landed in Greece's northeastern city of Alexandroupolis on board a Black Hawk helicopter and claimed political asylum in Greece. While the Turkish foreign minister Mevlüt Çavuşoğlu demanded extradition of "the eight traitors as soon as possible", the Greek authorities stated: "We will follow the procedures of international law. However, we give severe considerations to the fact that [the Turkish military men] are accused, in their own country, of violating the constitutional order and trying to overthrow democracy." The helicopter was returned to Turkey shortly thereafter. The eight asylum seekers, their asylum case pending, were later transferred to Athens, mainly for safety reasons. On 26 January, the Supreme Court of Greece eventually ruled against their extradition, on the grounds that the eight were unlikely to face a fair trial if returned to their home country and due to concerns over their safety.

On 15 February 2017, five Turkish commandos illegally entered Greece through the Evros river. However, once they entered the country, the group split. The two of them surrendered to the police and on 20 February 2017, requested political asylum. They were being held in the city of Alexandroupolis. The two men belonged to the Turkish navy. The names given by the two reportedly match the names of two fugitives wanted in relation to the shadowy operation against Erdoğan himself. The Greek government mentioned that the Greek authorities will not allow the country to be dragged into the ongoing feud between the Turkish state and the followers of Gulen. But there were no sign of the other three. According to a lawyer there were indications that the other three have been arrested by Greek authorities who were about to expel them to Turkey. According to new evidence and new information these three "arrested" marines were delivered under fast and informal procedures from Greek to Turkish services.

==== Turkish attachés sortie from Greece to Italy ====
After the coup attempt, two Turkish military attachés in Athens, Staff Col. İlhan Yaşıtlı and naval attaché Col. Halis Tunç, had reportedly disappeared along with their families. The Greek foreign ministry canceled the two attachés’ accreditations on 7 August 2016, upon the request of the Turkish foreign ministry. Greek media reported that they might have fled to Italy. On 11 August 2016, the Turkish foreign minister Mevlut Cavusoglu confirmed the reports saying that they had left Greece for Italy on 6 August and adding that Turkey would officially ask the Italian authorities to extradite the two soldiers.

==== Rear admiral's U.S. asylum application ====
On 9 August 2016, the media reported that Turkey's Rear Admiral Mustafa Zeki Ugurlu, who had been on a United States-based assignment for NATO and after the coup was subject to a detention order in Turkey, had sought asylum in the United States.

==== Asylum bids in Germany and Belgium ====
In mid-November 2016, it was officially confirmed that about 40 Turkish military servicemen of various ranks stationed at NATO command structures had applied for asylum in Germany and Belgium.

In January 2017, Der Spiegel magazine and ARD broadcaster reported that about 40 mostly high-ranking Turkish soldiers who worked at NATO facilities in Germany requested asylum in Germany.

At the end of February 2017, Germany said it had received 136 asylum requests from Turks holding diplomatic passports since the July coup attempt. The figure was a total for August 2016 to January 2017; some were presumed to be military officers posted to NATO bases in Germany.

==== Asylum bids in NATO countries ====
In November 2016, NATO's secretary general, Jens Stoltenberg, said that Turkish NATO Officers had requested asylum in the countries where they had been posted. He did not name the nations involved or the number of officers, saying it was a matter for those countries to decide. He said: "Some Turkish officers working in NATO command structure ... have requested asylum in the countries where they are working. ... As always, this is an issue that is going to be assessed and decided by the different NATO allies as a national issue."

As of March 2017, Norway have granted asylum for four Turkish soldiers and a military attache.

==== Diplomats asylum bids ====
Several Turkish citizens with diplomatic passports have sought political asylum in Switzerland.

=== Torture reports ===
According to Amnesty International, detainees in Turkey have been denied access to legal counsel, have been beaten and tortured. They have not been provided with adequate food, water, or medical care. At least one has attempted suicide. Amnesty International wanted the European Committee for the Prevention of Torture to send people to check on detainees conditions. A person who had been on duty at the Ankara police headquarters said that police denied medical treatment to a detainee. "Let him die. We will say he came to us dead," the witness quoted a police doctor as saying.

Also, Erdoğan has extended the maximum period of detention for suspects from four days to 30, a move Amnesty said increased the risk of torture or other maltreatment of detainees.

Turkish Justice Ministry denied the reports and the Justice Minister Bekir Bozdağ said on his Twitter account: "There has not been any torture or assault of detainees in custody," in response to reports by Amnesty International. "The claims of torture and assault make up a pre-packaged misinformation campaign formed by members of FETÖ, one which is untrue and distorted,"

=== Anti-coup rally ===
On 7 August, between three and five million people gathered for an anti-coup rally organized by the Turkish authorities in Istanbul. President Erdoğan and the two leaders of the major opposition parties (the Republican People's Party and the Nationalist Movement Party) were present.

=== Greece: Change in migration and asylum seeking ===
==== Increase regarding Greek islands ====
Greek authorities on several Aegean islands have called for emergency measures to curtail a growing flow of refugees from Turkey; the number of migrants and refugees willing to make the journey across the Aegean has increased noticeably after the failed coup. At Athens officials voiced worries because Turkish monitors overseeing the deal in Greece had been abruptly pulled out after the failed coup without being replaced. Also, the mayor of Kos expressed concern in a letter to the Greek Prime Minister citing the growing influx of refugees and migrants after the failed coup. The Association of Greek Tourism Enterprises (SETE) warned about the prospect of another flare-up in the refugee/migrant crisis due to the Turkish political instability.

Vincent Cochetel, the director of the Europe Bureau of the Office of the United Nations High Commissioner for Refugees, said in August 2016 that parts of the EU-Turkey deal about immigration were already de facto suspended because no Turkish police were present at Greek detention centres to oversee deportations.

==== Turkish civilians ====
On 25 August 2016, seven Turkish citizens sought asylum in Greece. Two were university professors, and their two children applied for asylum in Alexandroupoli after they illegally entered the country from the northeastern border. Also, three businessmen illegally reached the Greek island of Rhodes, and they also applied for asylum.

On 30 August 2016, a Turkish judge arrived at the Greek island of Chios on a migrant boat, with six Syrian nationals, and sought asylum in the country. He told the Greek coastguard and police officers that he is being persecuted in Turkey for his political beliefs by President Tayyip Erdoğan. The Turkish judge had been arrested for illegally entering the country and was transferred to Athens for his asylum proceedings. The Syrian nationals claimed refugee status.

On 11 September 2016, four Turkish civilians were arrested by Turkish police. An academic and a teacher attempted to escape to Greece illegally by crossing the Evros river, and the other two because they organized the escape attempt. The academic and the teacher paid a total of 12,500 euros in Istanbul to arrange their escape to Greece. Before their attempt, both the academic and the teacher were suspended from their duties as part of the ongoing probe into the failed coup attempt. Police also seized an air raft, an oar and a pump while detaining the suspects. The court later ordered the two's release while the other two suspects, who organized the escape attempt, were arrested.

On 21 September 2016, ten Turkish civilians, two men, two women and six children landed by boat illegally on the Greek island of Rhodes and sought asylum. They told the Greek authorities they were working in the private sector in Turkey and the Turkish government was persecuting them due to their political beliefs.

On 29 September 2016, five Turkish nationals, a couple and their child and two other men, arrived in Greece, at Alexandroupolis by crossing the Evros River by boat illegally and requested political asylum.

On 12 December 2016, one female Turkish national, landed by boat, full of refugees and immigrants, illegally on the Greek island of Lesbos. She requested political asylum.

On 24 October 2017, Turkish authorities obtained information that 995 Turks have applied for asylum in Greece after the coup attempt.

More than 1,800 Turkish citizens requested asylum in Greece in 2017.

On 18 February 2018, seventeen Turkish nationals, including six children, requested asylum in Greece at Oinousses island.

In August 2018, the former lawmaker for the Peoples' Democratic Party, Leyla Birlik, requested asylum in Greece after illegally crossing the border near Alexandroupolis.

=== Germany—and Turkish factions within ===
Berlin mayor, Michael Müller (SPD), said Turkey was waging war on supporters of the Gülen movement in Germany. He said that Turkish officials had approached him and asked him whether he would be prepared to confront the Gülen movement in Berlin critically and, if necessary, to support measures against it. The mayor rejected the idea and made it very clear that Turkish conflicts could not be waged in the city.

Der Spiegel presented classified documents, which showed that Turkey's secret service (MIT) had asked Germany's foreign intelligence agency (BND) for help in rounding up Gülen supporters in Germany. The Turkish secret service wanted the BND to use its influence to spur German lawmakers into taking action against Gülen supporters and extraditing them to Turkey. Also, Turkey's government has sent German authorities requests for searches and extraditions linked to supporters of Fethullah Gülen in Germany.

In Germany businesses thought to be in support of the Gülen movement have been harassed by Erdoğan supporters.

After the failed coup, there was a massive demonstration in Cologne at Germany, in late July, in support of Turkish President Erdoğan. Erdoğan wanted to address the participants via video but was rejected by the local authorities and the German Constitutional Court due to security concerns. Turkey said that the ban was unacceptable and a violation of freedom of expression.

German authorities said Turkish mosques in Germany were playing Turkish politics and worried that Turkey's internal politics spilled over into German cities. For years, German authorities had encouraged Turkey's state-run religious institution Turkish-Islamic Union for Religious Affairs usually referred to as DİTİB to provide Islamic preachers and teachers and Gülen Movement Schools for the large Turkish diaspora in Germany. DİTİB manages some 900 mosques in Germany. Gülen movement runs 100 educational facilities in Germany.

After the failed coup DİTİB published a sermon praising "our noble nation" for rising against "a wretched network" that had sown "seeds of sedition, rebellion and hostility." According to Volker Beck, a member of the center-left Greens in Germany's Bundestag, "That was not a religious text. It was a declaration of obedience to Mr. Erdoğan and his measures since the coup attempt," Volker Kauder, parliamentary group leader of the Germany's ruling Christian Democrats, the Christian Democratic Union of Germany (CDU)/Christian Social Union in Bavaria (CSU) faction, said Turkish-Germans should be loyal to Germany first and foremost.

Germans of Turkish origin are being pressured in Germany by informers and officers of Turkey's MIT spy agency. According to reports Turkey had 6,000 informants plus MIT officers in Germany who were putting pressure on "German Turks". Hans-Christian Ströbele said that there was an "unbelievable" level of "secret activities" in Germany by Turkey's MIT agency. According to Erich Schmidt-Eenboom, not even the former communist East German Stasi secret police had managed to run such a large "army of agents" in the former West Germany: "Here, it's not just about intelligence gathering, but increasingly about intelligence service repression."

German lawmakers have called for an investigation, charging that Turkey is spying on suspected Gulen followers in Germany.

==== Turkish civilians asylum bids ====
Germany's Office for Migration and Refugees said on 18 November 2016, it had received 4,437 political asylum requests from Turkish citizens up to October, compared to 1,767 for the whole of last year. "We must expect that the number of Turks who are seeking political asylum in Germany will continue to rise," said Stephan Mayer, the domestic policy speaker of the union coalition in the Bundestag.

On 10 December 2016, eleven Turkish nationals, 10 adults and one child, in a martial arts group have applied for asylum in Germany.

As of January 2018, Germany was first place and Greece second as EU destinations of choice for Turkish nationals requesting asylum after the coup attempt. In May 2022, Finland and Sweden, which applied for NATO membership in response to Russia's invasion of Ukraine, formally rejected Turkey's extradition requests for numerous members of the Gülen movement and the PKK.

=== Companies raided ===
Turkish police have carried out simultaneous raids in 18 cities against companies associated with United States-based Fethullah Gülen. The state-run Anadolu Agency said police searched 204 premises and detained 187 businessmen for "membership in a terror organization" and "providing financial support to a terror organization". All suspects' assets were seized.

=== WikiLeaks ===
WikiLeaks released Turkish emails and documents to respond to the Turkish government's purges that followed the coup attempt. In turn, the Turkish Telecommunications Communications Board blocked access to the WikiLeaks website. On 17 July 2016 Wikileaks had announced on Twitter, the leak of approximately 300,000 emails and over 500,000 documents, including those to and from AKP.

WikiLeaks stated that it was attacked shortly after 17 July announcement of the planned publication and hypothesized that Turkish authorities were responsible. WikiLeaks stated in a tweet, "our infrastructure is under sustained attack." Tweets from WikiLeaks include "We are unsure of the true origin of the attack. The timing suggests a Turkish state power faction or its allies. We will prevail & publish." and: "Turks will likely be censored to prevent them reading our pending release of 100k+ docs on politics leading up to the coup.", "We ask that Turks are ready with censorship bypassing systems such as TorBrowser and uTorrent"; "And that everyone else is ready to help them bypass censorship and push our links through the censorship to come."

Upon the release of the email dump, it has been reported that the emails contain little to no damning information, and instead are just mails from a public mailing list, but also linked externally to "voter information on all of the women registered to vote in 78 out of Turkey's 81 provinces".

=== Renamed places ===
Several places were renamed to commemorate the failed coup:

- Boğaziçi Köprüsü (Bosphorus Bridge) → 15 Temmuz Şehitler Köprüsü
- Kızılay Meydanı → 15 Temmuz Kızılay Demokrasi Meydanı
- Ahmet Taner Kışlalı Meydanı → 15 Temmuz Milli İrade Meydanı (Reverted to original name a few days later)
- Büyük İstanbul Otogarı → İstanbul 15 Temmuz Demokrasi Otogarı
- In TRT, Yeni Haber Stüdyosu → 15 Temmuz Millet Stüdyosu
- Kazan → Kahramankazan about the province's local people's resistance to the coup plotters. Kahraman means "hero" in Turkish
- Niğde University → Niğde Ömer Halisdemir University

In 2018, the Istanbul Municipal Council decided to change the names of a total of 90 streets that included words which could be associated with FETÖ.

=== Restrictions on funeral services for coupists ===
The Presidency of Religious Affairs stated that it would not be providing religious funeral services to the dead coupists, except for "privates and low-ranking officers compelled by force and threats who found themselves in the midst of the conflict without full knowledge of anything".

=== Reports of spying ===
A document dated 26 September 2016 showed that Turkey's Directorate of Religious Affairs (Diyanet) asked Turkish missions and religious representatives abroad to profile Gülen movement expatriates living in their respective foreign countries. Gülen-linked schools, businesses, foundations, associations, media outlets and others were also included in the reports. Turkey's Directorate of Religious Affairs has gathered intelligence via imams from 38 countries.

Belgium officials said they would withdraw recognition of Diyanet mosques in the country if necessary.

German lawmakers have called for an investigation, charging that Turkey is spying on suspected Gulen followers in Germany.

On 21 December 2016, the Turkish government has recalled Yusuf Acar, the religious affairs attaché of the Turkish Embassy in the Netherlands, after Dutch authorities said he was spying. Acar collected information of people who sympathize with Fethullah Gülen at Netherlands and passed it on to the Turkish authorities. The Dutch government called spying activities an "unwanted and non-acceptable interference in the lives of Dutch citizens." and the attaché was reportedly declared persona non grata and received a "deportation warning" by Dutch authorities.

=== Requests for help from other countries ===
On 26 January 2017, President Erdoğan, during his visit to Tanzania, asked his Tanzanian counterpart John Magufuli to take action against the network of Fethullah Gülen.

=== Museum ===
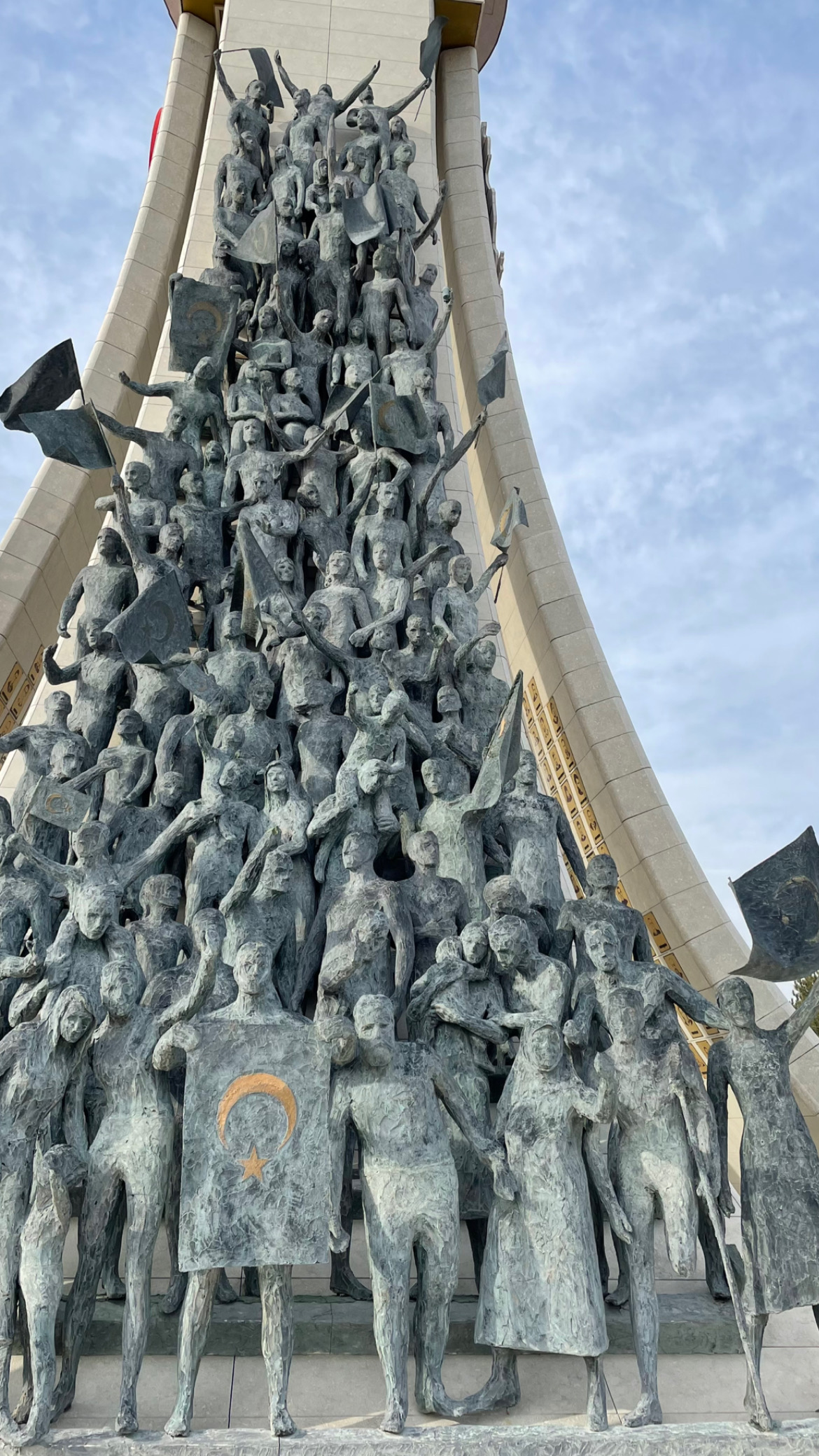
15 July Martyrs' Monument at the Presidential Complex

In April 2017 it was announced that President Erdoğan planned to establish a purpose-built museum dedicated to the coup events, called the "Museum of the 15 July: Martyrs and Democracy", to be located in Kahramankazan, a town near Ankara. Paid for by Turkish Ministry of Culture funds, it is planned to open at the end of 2018. The museum opened in December 2019.

== Third-party reactions ==
=== Domestic ===
Among the Turkish opposition parties, the Republican People's Party (CHP) issued a statement expressing their public opposition to the coup, and the Hürriyet Daily News reported that Nationalist Movement Party (MHP) leader Devlet Bahçeli telephoned Prime Minister Binali Yıldırım to express his opposition to the coup. The co-chairs of the opposition Peoples' Democratic Party (HDP) issued a statement saying that the party was "under all circumstances and as a matter of principle against all kinds of coup." Amongst the minor parties, left-wing nationalist Patriotic Party's Doğu Perinçek backed democracy, when he held Gülen and the Americans responsible. Kurdish militant separatist organization Kurdistan Workers' Party, which Turkey and its allies recognise as a terrorist organization, urged their supporters to stay away from the coup and rather defend their people, while the Communist Party called upon the people to overthrow the AKP government which they called an "enemy of humanity".

=== International ===
During the first hours of the coup plotters' moves of blocking Istanbul's bridges and flying fighter jets low over Istanbul and Ankara, Council of Europe Secretary General Thorbjørn Jagland tweeted against the coup attempt and underlined that "any attempt to overthrow the democratically elected leaders is unacceptable".

Russia's President Vladimir Putin called Erdoğan out of solidarity before all NATO member countries' heads following the coup attempt. Erdoğan thanked the president of Kazakhstan, Nursultan Nazarbayev – who was the first president to show solidarity after the coup attempt – for his support in solving the 7-month crisis over downed Russian Sukhoi Su-24 and the Prime Minister of Greece, Alexis Tsipras, who was among the first NATO country leaders to condemn the coup attempt, already from the early hours of Saturday.

Prime Minister Nawaz Sharif, the then Prime Minister of Pakistan, was all praise for the people of Turkey and the AKP government and strongly condemned what he termed as an attempt to undermine democracy in Turkey. "We deeply admire the resolve of the brave and resilient Turkish people, who stood up against the forces of darkness and anarchy to express their support and commitment to democracy," the PM said in a statement issued from his office.

The majority of countries either expressed their support for the government or called for restraint. On 16 July 2016, however, a proposed United Nations Security Council statement denouncing the coup was not accepted by Egypt, a non-permanent member of the Council at the time, due to textual disagreements. Egyptian diplomats said that the council is "in no position to qualify, or label [the Turkish] government – or any other government for that matter – as democratically elected or not". Objection by the United States and the UK – permanent members of the Security Council – led to Egypt proposing a new statement calling for all sides to "respect the democratic and constitutional principles and the rule of law", which was rejected, preventing the condemnation of the coup attempt by the Security Council. The leader of the opposition Liberal Democratic Party of Russia, Vladimir Zhirinovsky supported the coup attempt.

Al-Monitor reported that "Unlike Ankara's Western allies, Iran did not wait for the coup's failure to speak up. Foreign Minister Mohammad Javad Zarif voiced support for democracy in a Twitter message in the early hours of the unrest, writing "Stability, and democracy in Turkey are paramount". In a subsequent phone call after the failure of the coup attempt, President Hassan Rouhani told Erdoğan the coup attempt was "a test to identify your domestic and foreign friends and enemies." An Iranian official pointed out parallels between the coup attempt in Turkey and the coup against Iranian Prime Minister Mohammad Mussadiq in 1953: “What we know is that this attempt was triggered by foreign hands. We have experienced the same thing in the past. Since Mr. Erdogan wants to play a more positive path in the region today, they want to overthrow him.”

Mustafa Akıncı, President of Northern Cyprus, welcomed the fact that "no community in Turkey ... applauded the coup as they have done in the past." Azerbaijan strongly condemned the attempted military coup in Turkey and considered such actions unacceptable according to a statement from Novruz Mammadov, deputy head of the Azerbaijani Presidential Administration and chief of the foreign relations department.

European Commissioner dealing with Turkey's EU membership bid, Johannes Hahn, said it appears Turkey's government prepared arrest lists of political opponents before the coup attempt and had been waiting for the right time to act. In this sense, EU reported that as a main criticism to put this issue in the category of terrorism become the violation of the fundamental rights and fundamental values of the citizens. Hence, it underlines a total divergence of opinions and mentality between EU and Turkey which reached a deadlock here especially after 15 July 2016.

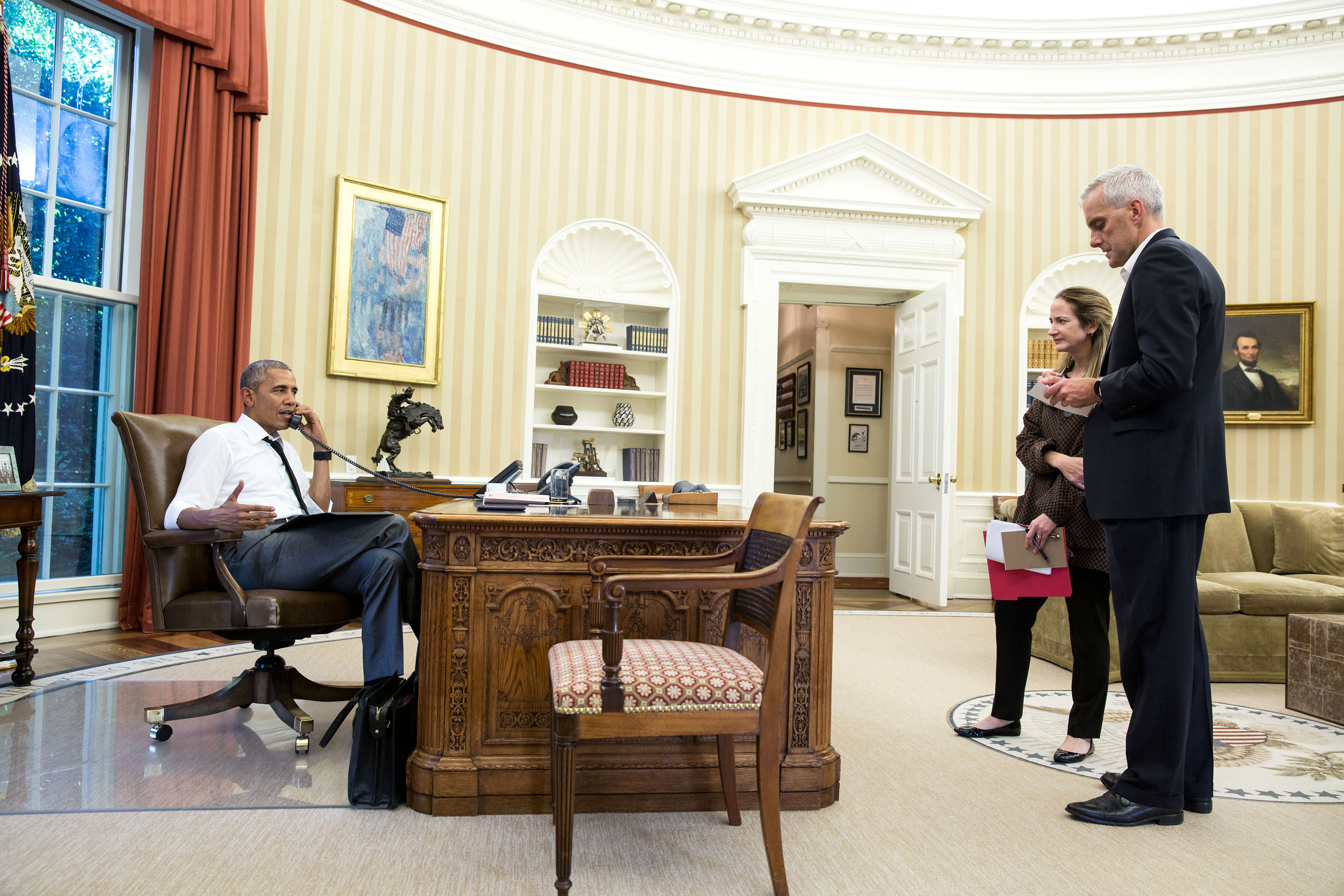
President Barack Obama talks on the phone in the Oval Office with John Kerry regarding the situation in Turkey, 15 July 2016

On 19 July 2016, White House spokesperson Josh Earnest said during a press briefing that President Barack Obama has held a phone conversation with President Erdoğan: "The President used the phone call to reiterate once again the strong commitment of the United States to the democratically elected civilian government of Turkey. The President pledged any needed assistance to the Turkish government as they conduct an investigation to determine exactly what happened."

On 20 July 2016, NATO Secretary General Jens Stoltenberg said: "Turkey has a large armed force, professional armed forces and ... I am certain they will continue as a committed and strong NATO ally." On a statement released on 10 August 2016, the Secretary General once more strongly condemned the attempted coup and reiterated full support for Turkey's democratic institutions. He also expressed support for the elected Turkish government and respect for the courage of the Turkish people for resisting the coup plotters.

On 29 July 2016, the commander of U.S. Central Command, General Joseph Votel, denied statements by Turkey's president Erdoğan that he has supported the coup attempt in Turkey.

On 1 August 2016, United States Joint Chiefs of Staff Chairman, General Joseph Dunford, visited Turkey and condemned the coup attempt. Dunford said: "The consistent theme throughout the day was a reaffirmation of the importance of the U.S.-Turkey relationship – the need for us to cooperate."

==== Greek maritime patrols for coup fugitives ====
On 20 July, there were reports that a group of Turkish military commandos coup fugitives would try to cross from Turkey to the island of Symi, in the southeastern Aegean, at Greece. The Hellenic Coast Guard was on alert and increased the patrols in the area, especially after a group of inflatable dinghies and other vessels were seen departing from Datça, on the Turkish coast, in the direction of Symi, they monitored the movements of the Turkish vessels, which remained in Turkish waters. Furthermore, a contingent of the Hellenic Police was dispatched to Symi to conduct checks there. The Greek government had been anticipating a possible attempt by participants in the failed coup to come to Greece and took the reports seriously. Turkish F-16 fighter jets were also scrambled to check reports that missing Turkish coast guard vessels had appeared in Greek waters in the Aegean. Later on the day, the Turkish interior ministry denied reports that rebel soldiers might have "hijacked" a vessel to flee to Greece. The Greek armed forces remained on alert the throughout the day for potential coup fugitives.

== Causes ==
According to Michael Rubin, from the American Enterprise Institute (AEI), Erdoğan had himself to blame for the coup. Following an increasingly Islamist agenda, Erdoğan had reportedly "dropped any pretense of governing for all Turks." After "fanning the flames" at the 2013 Gezi Park protests, he transformed the predominantly Kurdish-inhabited areas of southeastern Turkey "into a war zone reminiscent of the worst days of the 1980s." The biggest problem, according to Rubin, might have been Erdoğan's foreign policy, which managed to turn the initial "no problems with neighbors" doctrine into a situation where the country has problems with almost every neighbor and has even alienated some of its allies and friends. Rubin previously worked as an official at the Pentagon and less than 4 months before the coup, he wrote an article in Newsweek magazine titled, "Will There Be a Coup Against Erdogan in Turkey?"

British Middle East correspondent Robert Fisk warned that "too late did Erdoğan realize the cost of the role he had chosen for his country. It's one thing to say sorry to Putin and patch up relations with Netanyahu; but when you can no longer trust your army, there are more serious matters to concentrate upon." Even if this coup may have failed, Fisk expected another to follow in the months or years to come.

Turkish professor Akın Ünver described the coup d'état attempt as "more of a mutiny".

=== Peace at Home Council ===
The name of the "Peace at Home Council" – Yurtta Sulh Konseyi– is derived from Atatürk's famous saying 'Peace at Home, Peace in the World'. Journalist Ezgi Başaran said that "the statement of the junta, that was [...] read on the [...] government TV [channel] as the coup got under way, bore a strong resemblance to Mustafa Kemal Atatürk's famous address to the Turkish Youth. [...] On the other hand, given that these references are too obvious, they may have been intentionally included to insinuate a Kemalist junta rather than a Gülenist one."

The citizen journalism site Bellingcat published an analysis of the messages of a WhatsApp group consisting of high-ranking military officials who had taken part in the coup covering their activities including them killing several people. The messages were cross referenced with video footage. The group was named "Yurtta sulh" which refers to a peace at home speech and they seem secular and military with no references to Gülen or anything related during the several hours of messaging.

News reports have suggested that the coup ringleader was Adil Öksüz. Some believe Öksüz to have been an operative with Turkish intelligence as he was released by the police after his arrest post coup attempt.

=== Timing ===
German Islamic studies scholar Rainer Hermann said the putschists tried to forestall a large-scale purge of judiciary and military, the implementation of which had already started on Saturday, the day after the coup attempt. According to Turkish investigative journalist Ahmet Şık, a list of officials to be purged had been ready compiled by the attorney-general of Izmir, Okan Bato, and was approved by President Erdoğan. According to this version, the putschists had to quickly bring forward their coup attempt before being disposed and arrested.

=== Staged coup reports ===
During and after the events, several politicians and commentators suggested that the government knew about the coup in advance and possibly directed it. The facts that the coup attempt began in the evening rather than at a more inconspicuous time and that the events were largely confined to Ankara and Istanbul contributed to doubts about the authenticity of the coup attempt. Journalists and opposition politicians branded it a 'tragic comedy' and 'theatre play'. Advocates of such theories pointed to how Erdoğan stood to gain from the coup attempt in terms of increasing his popularity and support for his calls for an executive presidency, while being able to legitimize further crackdowns on judicial independence and the opposition in general.

Other elements that were reported to support the theory included: no list of demands by the coup plotters, the organization and response of the police, the long lists of arrests that seemed to be ready surprisingly quickly (including arrests of 2,745 judges and 2,839 soldiers the morning of the coup attempt), and the obvious nature of the coup actions.

Fethullah Gülen, whom Erdoğan had said as being one of the principal conspirators, commented, "I don't believe that the world believes the accusations made by President Erdoğan. There is a possibility that it could be a staged coup and it could be meant for further accusations [against the Gülenists]." Journalist Cengiz Çandar, a veteran observer of Turkey's coups, said "I have never seen any with this magnitude of such inexplicable sloppiness." Prominent Hizmet (Gülen movement) spokesman Alp Aslandogan said, referencing that the Turkish Air Force commander met with Erdoğan before 15 July, that certain legal documentation related to the coup seemed written beforehand, arguing that within "the indictment written by a prosecutor on the night of 15 July to 16 July, there were events there that didn't actually happen. Some events did happen, but those events didn't happen by the time the document started. It looks like a bigger plan was there, and part of the plan did not come to pass."

In a September 2025 analysis published in Small Wars Journal, security scholars and former Turkish military officers Mustafa Kirisci, Ibrahim Kocaman, and Murat Balci argued that the events of July 15 exhibited the hallmarks of a controlled intelligence operation rather than an orthodox military coup. They pointed to several anomalies to support this thesis, including the absence of pre-coup civil–military friction, the failure of over 40 court cases to produce a written coup plan, and the immediate overnight dismissal of more than 2,700 judges—which they suggested indicated pre-prepared purge lists. The authors also highlighted court-accepted forensic reports showing that some fatalities resulted from non-combat causes or ammunition not used by the Turkish Armed Forces, as well as the refusal of Chief of General Staff Hulusi Akar and MİT head Hakan Fidan to testify before the parliamentary investigative commission.

==== Evidence of pre-planning ====
The organization and spontaneous synchronization by large numbers of mosques was perceived to be unachievable unless there had been prior preparation, with journalists also pointing to how Erdoğan could have strategically used the call to prayer to invoke religious sentiment in a political situation as a veiled attack on state secularism.

Thousands of arrests and purges were conducted by Turkish authorities between 16 and 18 July 2016. The sheer number of these arrests made at such a speed could only be done so if the "Turkish government had all those lists ready", as suggested by Johannes Hahn, European Commissioner for Enlargement and European Neighbourhood Policy, on 18 July 2016. Hahn also said that because these lists were already available immediately after the coup, the "event was prepared" and the lists were to be used "at a certain stage".

==== Possible connections of the coup leaders to Erdoğan ====
Mehmet Dişli, who was seen giving orders to the coup plotters and who was the one who put a belt around Hulusi Akar's neck to make him sign, is the brother of Şaban Dişli, a former vice president of the ruling Justice and Development Party (AKP) and confidant of Erdoğan.

==== Possible government motives ====
Several social media users have compared the coup attempt to the Reichstag fire in 1933, which Adolf Hitler used as an excuse to suspend civil liberties and order mass arrests of his opponents. Politico correspondent Ryan Heath said that "the coup was staged to allow Erdoğan to purge the military of opponents and increase his grip on the country". Heath used Twitter to share comments from his Turkish source, who called the events of Friday night a "fake coup" which would help a "fake democracy warrior" (referring to Erdoğan). The source said: "Probably we'll see an early election [in] which he'll try to guarantee an unbelievable majority of the votes. And this will probably guarantee another 10–15 years of authoritarian, elected dictatorship."

The New York Times reported that some Turkish citizens believed the coup attempt was staged by Erdoğan to improve his public image and popularity, while cracking down on political opponents and expanding his power. Critics found it suspect that reportedly no government officials were arrested or harmed during the attempted coup, which—among other factors—raised the suspicion of a false flag event staged by the Turkish government to crack down on opposition parties. Those in Turkey suggesting that the coup was staged are also being questioned by the government.

Politicians and journalists who were skeptical of the authenticity of the coup plot said that in reality, a 'civil coup' had effectively been staged against the Armed Forces and Judiciary, both of which were extensively purged of stated Gülen supporters by the government shortly after the events. Skeptics said that the coup would be used as an excuse for further erosion of judicial independence and a crackdown on the opposition, giving the AKP greater and unstoppable power over all state institutions and paving the way for a more radical Islamist agenda at odds with the founding principles of the Turkish Republic.

Justice Minister Bekir Bozdağ said in late July 2016 that Turkish social media users who said the government was staging the coup faced investigation: "Just look at the people who are saying on social media that this was theatre. Public prosecutors are already investigating them. Most of them are losers who think it is an honor to die for Fethullah Gülen's command."

On 12 July 2017, Stockholm Center for Freedom, a monitoring group with reported links to the Gülen movement, published a controversial report stating that President Erdoğan orchestrated the coup bid as a false flag to consolidate his powers, set up his opposition for a mass persecution, and push Turkish Armed Forces into a military incursion into Syria. According to the report, it uncovered new evidence from 11 July 2016, four days before the planned coup bid, that a secret plan was circulated among select group of Armed Forces to give an appearance of a coup attempt. The plan was sanctioned by intelligence and military chiefs with the approval of Erdoğan.

=== Allegations of CIA involvement ===
In early November 2017, Turkish authorities issued an arrest warrant for Henri J. Barkey, former Director of the Middle East Program of the Woodrow Wilson International Center for Scholars, stating that he is an agent of the United States Central Intelligence Agency (CIA), that he was present in Istanbul during the 2016 Turkish coup attempt, and that he was one of the key organizers behind the coup attempt. Around 1 December, the Istanbul prosecutor's office issued an arrest warrant for Graham E. Fuller, an American author and political analyst specializing in Islamic extremism after a long CIA career and holding the role of vice-chair of the United States National Intelligence Council. The prosecutor's office based the warrant on suspicion of Fuller helping to plan the coup attempt. Hürriyet stated that Turkish authorities believed that they had traced Fuller's location before the attempted coup and afterward when he left Turkey.

Barkey denied his reported role in the coup, describing the claims as "so ludicrous that they do not even deserve the term 'science fiction'."

== See also ==
- Politics of Turkey
- History of Turkish coups
- Deep state in Turkey
- The Imam's Army
- List of coups and coup attempts since 2010
- List of modern conflicts in the Middle East
- List of attacks on legislatures
