= Muharrem Köse =

Turkish military personnel

- Military career
- Allegiance: Turkey
- Branch: Turkish Land Forces
- Rank: Colonel

Colonel Muharrem Köse is an officer in the Turkish Armed Forces. He was claimed by unnamed sources in the Turkish security forces to have been a leader of the 2016 Turkish coup attempt on 15 July 2016. Köse had reportedly been expelled from the military some months earlier.

Colonel Köse was arrested on 19 July 2016, four days after the coup attempt. He was later released and appointed to the Chief General Staff's office on 27 August 2016.

== See also ==
- Peace at Home Council
