= July 2016 Turkish military asylum incident in Greece =

During the failed 2016 Turkish coup d'état attempt on 15 July 2016, eight Turkish military personnel claimed asylum in Greece. The Turkish servicemen arrived in Greece on board a UH-60 Black Hawk helicopter. Although a Greek court ruled that three of the officers could be extradited to Turkey, Greece's Supreme Court overruled that decision and denied the extradition of all eight soldiers. This was one of multiple similar incidents during the coup attempt.

== 2016 ==
=== July ===
==== 16 July ====
Turkish Foreign Minister Mevlüt Çavuşoğlu said that Turkey requested extradition of eight military personnel who had escaped to Greece and the return of the Turkish military helicopter that transported them. The Greek authorities responded stating that the helicopter would be returned as soon as possible. Regarding the passengers, they said, "we will follow the procedures of international law. However, we give very serious considerations to the fact that they are accused, in their country, of violating the constitutional order and trying to overthrow democracy." The Turkish Foreign Minister made a statement, posted on Twitter, that the soldiers who landed in Greece claiming asylum would be extradited. A Greek government source denied this, saying the asylum request would be processed swiftly but that international law and human rights would be fully respected.

The lawyer assigned to four of the Turkish military officers said they were all medical crew in Istanbul, that they didn’t know about the coup, and that they had families and children in Turkey. She also added that the officers received orders on the evening of 15 July to transfer some injured people in their helicopters. They followed orders without knowing that a coup was under way. At some point, police opened fire against their helicopters. By that time, they were aware that a coup was under way and feared they would be executed as participants if they stayed in Turkey, so boarded a helicopter not damaged by police fire, and flew to Greece to request asylum. The lawyer also added that they were "in a bad mental state" because they were afraid for both their own and their families’ lives. They didn't believe that they would be given a fair trial in Turkey.

After 11:00 p.m. (EEST), a second Turkish Black Hawk helicopter with extra crew members arrived at the Greek airport from Turkey in order to retrieve the first helicopter. After the crew checked the first helicopter, both helicopters returned to Turkey early on the morning of 17 July.

==== 17 July ====
The eight Turkish soldiers appeared before a Greek prosecutor at Alexandroupoli on the morning of 17 July and were charged with entering the country illegally, jeopardizing Greek and Turkish relations, and illegal flight. Seven were charged with instigating the illegal flight while the eighth, who was piloting the helicopter, was accused of executing the illegal flight. Later, the charges regarding jeopardizing Greek and Turkish relations were dropped.

==== 18 July ====
On 18 July, the Turkish soldiers appeared before a judge in Alexandroupoli. They arrived at the courthouse in civilian clothes with their faces covered. The court postponed the trial to 21 July 2016. Turkish officials who sat directly behind the Turkish soldiers in the courtroom threatened the soldiers until a Greek lawyer asked for them to be moved. Their lawyer said that: "My clients told me that in the court were people from Turkey, and they said bad words against them. Someone who speaks Turkish told me they called them 'dogs, traitors, we will kill you'. Something like that."

Greek Deputy Defence Minister Dimitris Vitsas noted that the group's asylum applications were being processed and a decision would be made by the Greek courts. Although the applications would be examined under both "Greek and international law", the argument for extradition was "very strong". The Turkish ambassador to Greece indicated that if the soldiers were not returned to Turkey, it would not help bilateral relations between the two countries. He added that "Greece should not given landing permission to Turkish helicopter, it should not have even allowed it to enter Greek FIR."

Greek lawyer Konstantinos Starantzis said: "I suspect that the Greek authorities want a clean and immediate extradition procedure. However, there are strong legal arguments to oppose such a thing. We have to consider the safety of their lives. That is the first argument when granting asylum. They can't be extradited if there is the suspicion of a political or a military prosecution against them – and harsh penalties."

==== 19–27 July ====
On the night of 19 July, the soldiers were transferred from Alexandroupoli to Kavala for their own safety.

On 21 July, the Greek court sentenced the eight soldiers to two months in prison, suspended for three years, for illegally entering Greece, and they were acquitted of violating flight regulations since the regulations do not apply to military aircraft. The court recognized the mitigating circumstances that the men faced, having acted while under great threat. They remained in custody pending the outcome of their applications for asylum. During the trial there were six Turkish lawyers. One of them threatened the eight officers, resulting in immediate intervention by the Greek police who told the lawyer to leave the court.

On the morning of 22 July, the soldiers were transferred to Athens for safety reasons. Their lawyers said they had not been told about the transfer until the police director of Kavala informed them at noon.

On 27 July, the eight soldiers requested and received postponement, in order to be better prepared. The interviews for the first two were set for 19, 23, 24 and 25 August.

=== August–October ===
On 10 August, the Istanbul Chief Public Prosecutor’s Office sent an extradition request to the Justice Ministry to be sent to Greek authorities for the eight servicemen because of their suspected role in the coup attempt.

On 19 August, one of the Turkish servicemen, Captain Feridun Çoban, appeared before a Greek asylum committee.

On 29 August, three of the soldiers told the Asylum Commission that they had intentionally sought asylum in Belgium, France, and Spain so as to avoid extradition.

On 21 September, the lawyer for the three soldiers, Ms Stavroula Tomara said that they would appeal the extradition decision. The other five soldiers were to be re-interviewed by the asylum commission in Athens.

On 11 October, the first-instance board of Greece’s political asylum commission rejected the asylum application of another four of the eight coup-plotting soldiers. “We came to Greece to save our lives, not be pawns of foreign policy and bilateral agreements. We have not been labeled terrorists even in our own country,” their statement said.

=== December ===
On 5 December, a Greek court refused to extradite three of the soldiers, stating that to do so could put their lives in danger. The Turkish Minister of National Defence, Fikri Işık, reacted angrily saying that: "terrorism is terrorism, there is no distinction. The courts should make more careful decisions on terrorist organizations. The Governments of the other countries must show their allied solidarity. Greece is Turkey's ally in NATO. Our expectations from the Greek government is to try its best so that these members of the Fethullah Gülen network to return to Turkey"

On 6 December, a separate court approved extradition of another three of the soldiers. The soldiers and a chief Athens prosecutor appealed that decision. All appeals were to be heard by Greece's Supreme Court. According to their lawyer, “Unfortunately they feel very tired, psychologically they are feeling depressed. They don’t think they should be held in custody (also), as this affects their psychology. Some of them are on the verge of giving up hope.”

On 7 December, Turkish Foreign Minister Mevlut Cavusoglu called for the immediate extradition of the eight Turkish soldiers.

On 8 December, The Greek court ruled against the extradition of the last two Turkish soldiers.

== 2017 ==
=== January ===
On 9 January, the Turkish soldiers sent a handwritten letter to a Greek newspaper explaining their position.

Between 10–13 January, the Greek prosecutor recommended against the extradition of the eight Turkish military officers.

==== 26–28 January ====
On 26 January, the Supreme Court of Greece refused to extradite the eight Turkish soldiers. Presiding judge Giorgos Sakkas, reading out the decision on Thursday, said the eight were unlikely to face a fair trial if returned to their home country. The Court was also concerned about the possibility that these men would have been humiliated and even tortured in their own country, and claimed that its decision is based on respect for human rights. The Court ordered the release of the eight officers. However, they will remain in the police station of the Olympic village in Athens while their asylum requests are pending. The Court ruling is final and cannot be reversed, even by decision of the Minister of Justice.

The Turkish Foreign Ministry said that, "This decision is another indication of Greece’s reluctance in fighting against terror organizations like the outlawed Kurdistan Workers’ Party (PKK) and the Revolutionary People’s Liberation Party-Front (DHKP-C) which target Turkey". Two days later, the Court′s ruling was slammed by the Turkish defence minister saying that it was a political decision rather than a judiciary one.

On 28 January, the office of Greek prime minister Alexis Tsipras responded, saying: "We underline that the perpetrators of the coup are not welcome in our country. In any case, Greece applies the constitutionally-established and undisputed principle of separation of powers, with full respect for international law. Within Greece the sole responsible for the relevant judgments are the independent Greek Justice, whose decisions are, undoubtedly, binding."

=== December ===
On December the Greek asylum authorities approved the asylum request of one of the eight Turkish soldiers. They took into account reports from human rights groups and the Council of Europe, that warned Turkey has regularly committed human rights abuses against coup suspects. Turkey said that the decision undermined relations between the two countries. Greek Foreign Ministry responded that “Our faith in democratic principles and practices is not a weakness, but a source of strength,” also added “Democracies do not threaten, or can be threatened.", but the Greek government asked the country's judicial authorities to cancel the decision.

Eleven former bar association presidents from Greece issued a joint statement calling on the Greek government to respect the decision and grant political asylum to the Turkish soldier.

== 2018 ==
On 2 March, Turkey arrested two Greek soldiers for allegedly entering a Turkish military zone, on accusation of attempted espionage. Greece said the two soldiers on a patrol of the Greek-Turkish border accidentally strayed into Turkey Thursday because of bad weather. Heavy snow and fog had been reported in the area.

On 19 April, the European Parliament called for the Turkish government to immediately release the two Greek soldiers and on the Commission as well as the EU member-states to end accessions negotiations with Turkey and suspend pre-accession funds.

On 22 April, the Greek prime minister Alexis Tsipras denied Turkish president Erdoğan's proposal to exchange the two Greek soldiers with the eight Turkish servicemen.

On 1 May, a team of Turkish hackers took control of the website of the Athens News Agency sending threatening messages regarding the asylum granted by Greece, sparking a cyber-war between Greek and Turkish hackers.

In June, Turkey suspended its bilateral migrant readmission deal with Greece in response to the decision by the Greek government to release the eight Turkish soldiers who fled to Greece after the 2016 Turkish coup d'état attempt. NATO Secretary-General Jens Stoltenberg has called for “restraint and calm” after Turkey's decision.
