= Mustafa Zeki Uğurlu =

Turkish admiral (born 1965)

Rear Admiral Mustafa Zeki Uğurlu
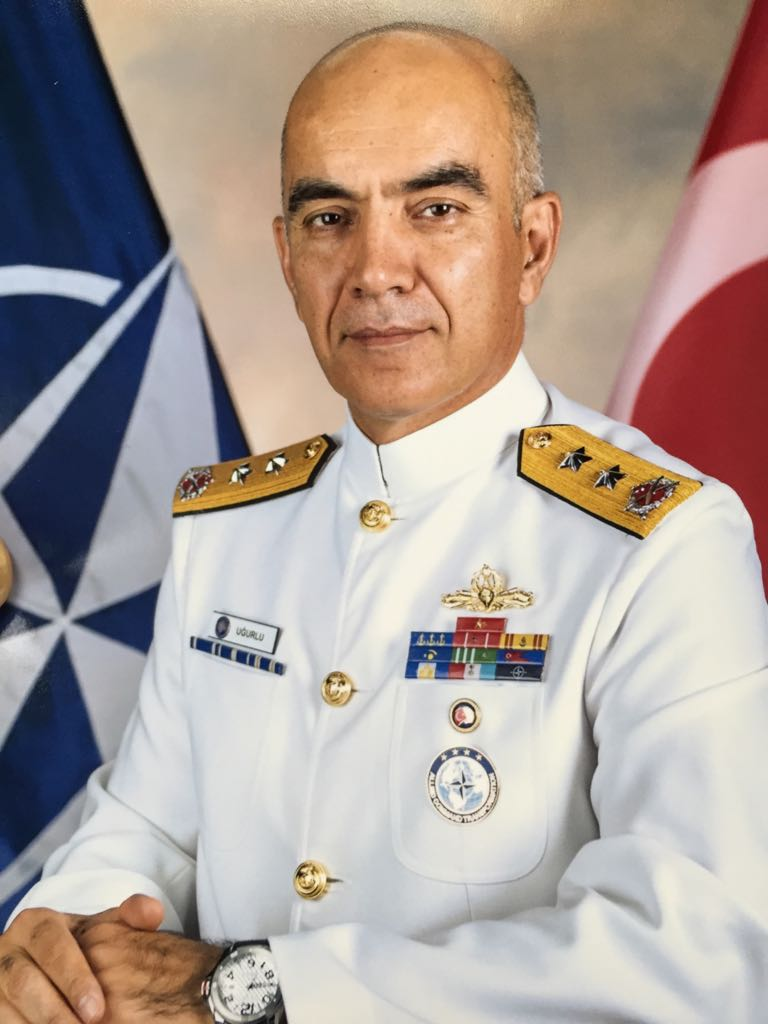
- Born: September 4, 1965 (age 60); Hakkari, Turkey
- Allegiance: Turkey
- Branch: Turkish Navy
- Service years: 1986–2016
- Rank: Rear admiral
- Commands: Turkish Mine Group; 4th Destroyer Division; TCG Zafer (USS Tomas C. Hart)
- Conflicts: Operation Active Endeavour; United Nations Interim Force in Lebanon; Operation Unified Protector
- Awards: 3rd The Navy-wide Innovative Research Project Competition; 5th The Navy-wide Innovative Research Project Competition

Mustafa Zeki Uğurlu is a two-star admiral in the Turkish Navy who recently served as a flag officer at NATO Supreme Allied Command Transformation in Norfolk, Virginia.

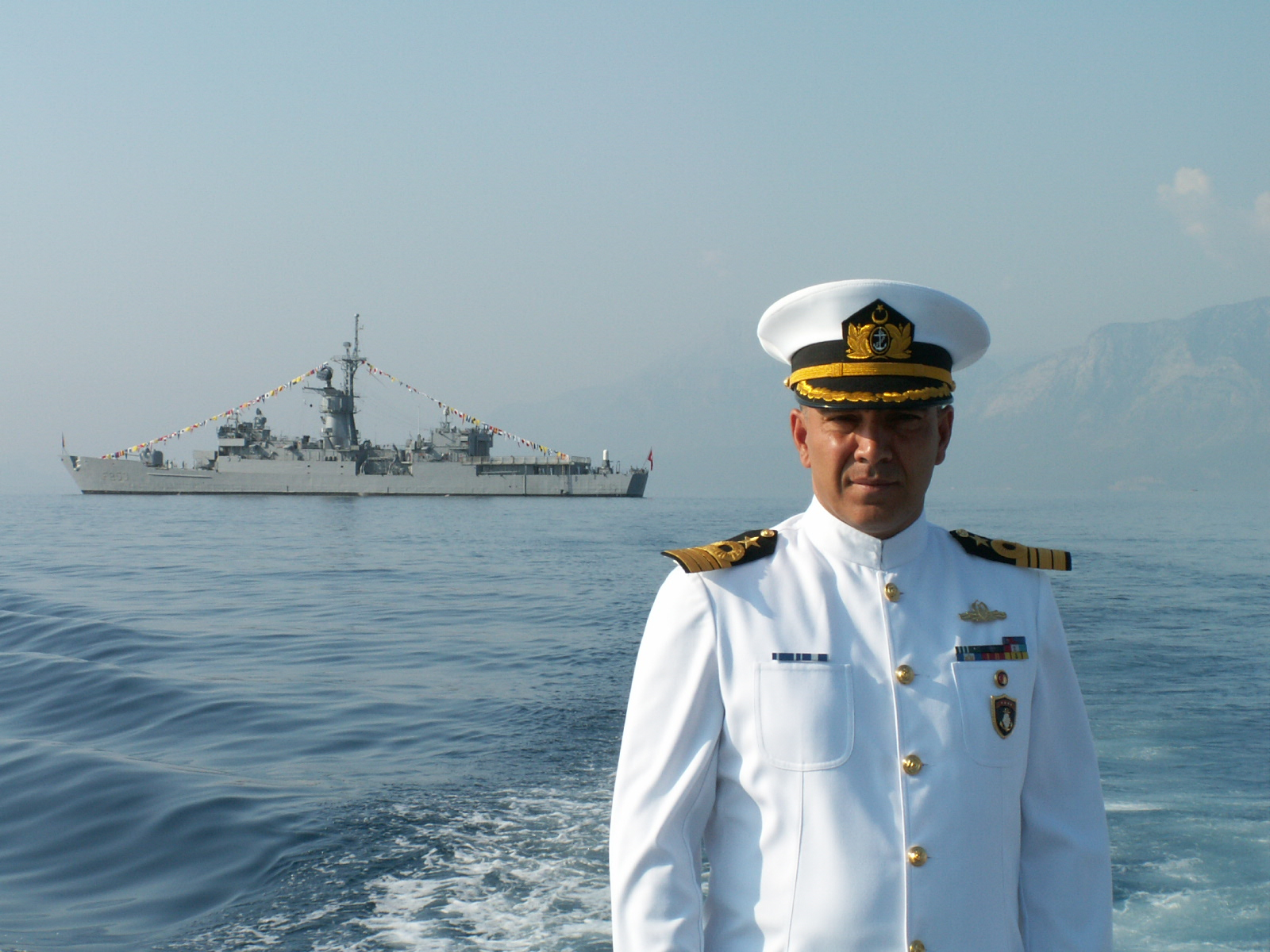
Admiral Mustafa Zeki Uğurlu CO, Thomas C Heart (TCG ZAFER)

== Navy career ==
He has been promoted to rear admiral (LH) in 2011. and Rear Admiral (UH) in 2015. Before his last assignment in NATO, He has served as Head of Communication and Information Systems Department between 2011 and 2012, Head of Personnel Department between 2012 and 2013, and the Commander of Turkish Mine Group between 2013 and 2015. He commanded Nusret 2013 and Nusret 2014 international Mine Warfare exercises.

As a surface warfare officer, he was assigned as Commanding Officer of TCG Zafer (USS Tomas C. Hart) between 2005 and 2007 and Commander of 4th Destroyer Division between 2010 and 2011. He participated in the Operation Active Endeavour in 2006, United Nations Interim Force in Lebanon (UNIFIL) in 2007 and Non-Combatants Evacuation Operation of Libya in 2011.

Ashore, Uğurlu served at NATO, Turkish General Staff and Turkish Naval Forces Headquarters as Naval Project & Planning Officer. During his NATO Allied Joint Forces Command Naples-Italy tour, he participated Kosovo and Bosnia-Herzeginova operations between 2000 and 2003.

His assignment included a role as inspector officer for Organization for Security and Cooperation in Europe (OSCE), where he executed monitoring mission in old Eastern Bloc Countries and participated in international inspections.

== NATO and international career ==
He served as Assistant Chief of Staff of Command & Control, Deployability and Sustainability in NATO Supreme Allied Command Transformation in Norfolk, USA between 2015 and 2016. He was responsible for NATO's Cyber Defense, Big Data, Artificial Intelligence, Communication Information Systems, Space, Federated Mission Networking, Core Enterprise Services, Ballistic Missile Defense programs.

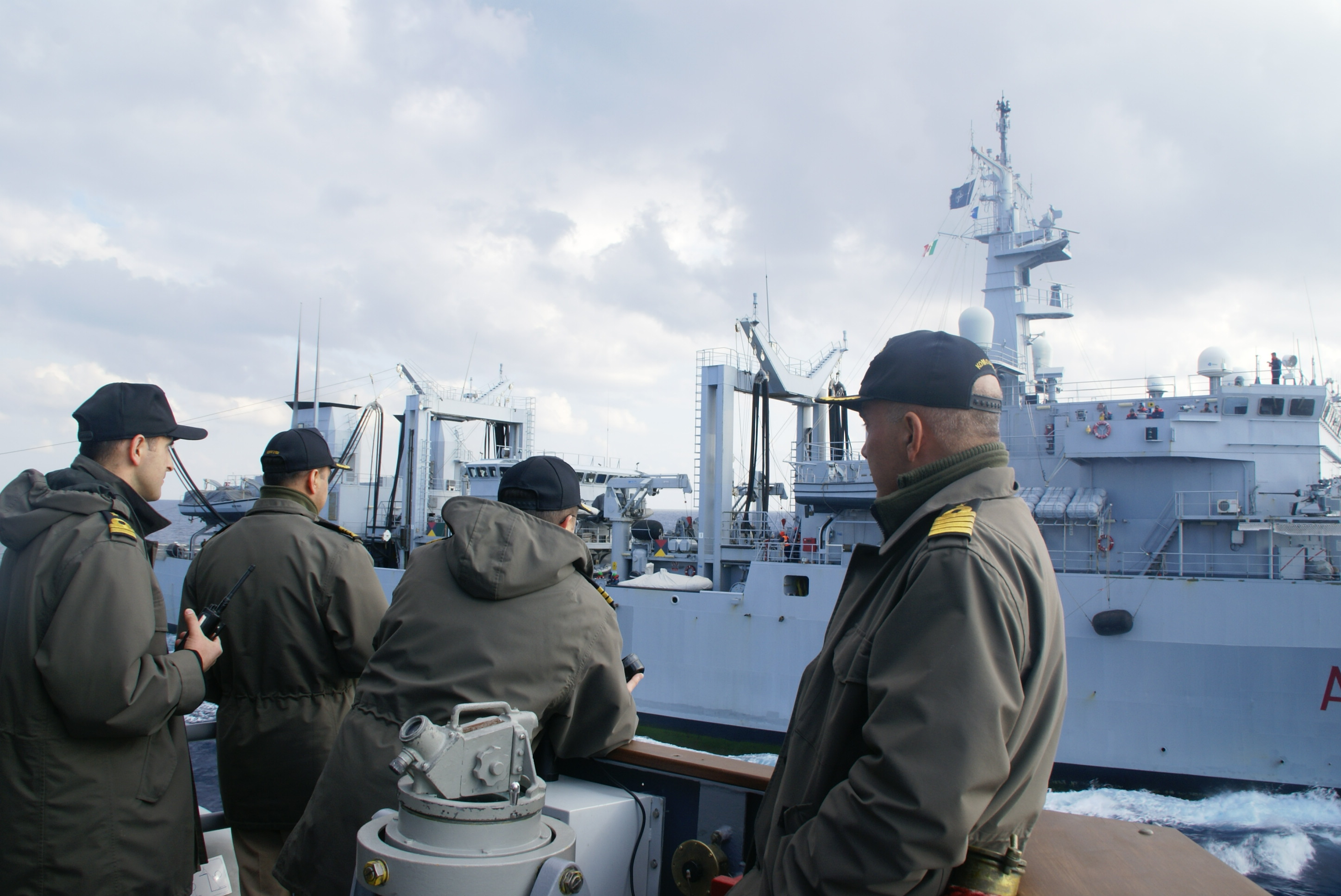

He was a member of key NATO executive boards, including Consultation Command Control Board (C3B), Agency Supervisory Board (ASB), Cyber Defense Management Board (CDMB), and Capability Package Board (CPB).

He was Naval Planning Officer in NATO-AFSOUTH-Napoli between 2000 and 2003, he was responsible for developing maritime capabilities on NATO naval bases and facilities in the Mediterranean.

He was assigned as an inspector officer for Organization for Security and Cooperation in Europe (OSCE), monitoring missions in old Eastern Bloc Countries, as well as participated in international inspections with European partners between 1998 and 2000.

He have participated in international operations, United Nations Interim Force in Lebanon (UNIFIL), Active Endeavour, and Evacuation Operation from Libya as a Tactical Commander or Commanding Officer.

== Awards ==
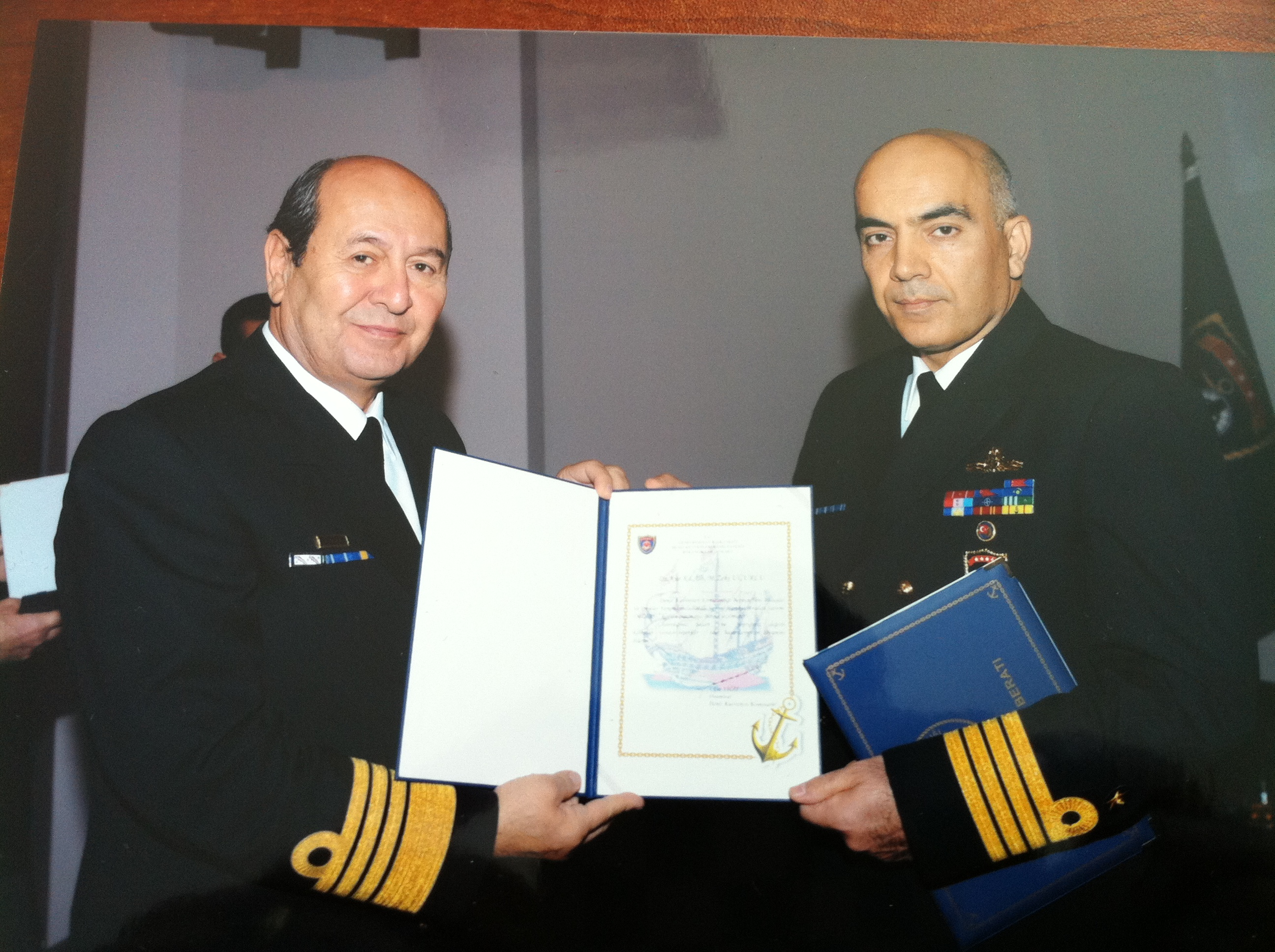
Admiral Uğurlu (right) having his award for becoming the first at Navy-wide Innovative Research Project Competition

He is well known with his breakthrough data science projects. He has won “The Innovative Research Project Competition” twice with his Big Data and Artificial Intelligence (AI) related projects.

1998, The honor of degree of Naval War College by Turkish Prime Minister Mr. Mesut Yılmaz

1999, The article 5 NATO medal for service with NATO in relation to Active Endeavour Operations

2000, The NATO Medal for service with NATO in relation to Kosovo Operations

2000, The NATO Medal for service with NATO in relation to Former Yugoslavia Operations

2007, Became the third in the 3rd Navy-wide Innovative Research Project Competition with his "Digital Sail and Fire Control System" project.

2011, Became the first in the 5th Navy-wide Innovative Research Project Competition with his "National Digital Operational Analysis System" project.

== End of his Navy career ==
He was in NATO Headquarters/Norfolk-USA when the failed coup attempt started in Turkey on 15 July 2016. He was being called by the ruling party AKP during ongoing series of purges enabled by a state of emergency after the 15 July failed coup d'état. His duty and service ended with an emergency decree on 29 July 2016 with more than 200K Turkish military service, as well as various civil servants and private businesses. He could not return to Turkey and is believed to be residing in the United States.

In 2020 he told NPR, "It was a false flag operation. It was a perfect plan, initiated, controlled, and executed by the regime. But they made many mistakes and left clear evidence and witnesses behind them."

== Education ==
Graduated with distinction from Armed Forces Staff College – Istanbul, 2008

Graduated with distinction from Naval War College – Istanbul, 1998

Bachelor of Science: Electric-Electronics, Naval Academy – Istanbul, 1986
