= Tijen Karaş =

Turkish television presenter (born 1975)

Tijen Karaş (born 28 January 1975, Ankara) is a Turkish broadcaster and news anchor, working for state-run Turkish Radio and Television Corporation (TRT). In July 2016, she became widely known during the attempted coup d'état, after she was forced to read out a declaration written by the soldiers who had taken over the TRT building in Ankara.

== Life ==
Tijen Karaş was born 28 January 1975 in Yenimahalle in Ankara, Turkey. She is the middle of three daughters. Karaş is a graduate of Hacettepe University specializing in sociology. During her university years, she began presenting on Turkey's TRT International Avrasya channel. She also edited the column "Sanat ve Politika" for the Turkish News Agency. In 1995 she worked at C TV, presenting an arts and culture programme called 'Günce', and later presented live music programmes on TRT. Programmes presented by Karaş include Mehmetçikle El Ele, Bayram Özel, Sayısal Gece, Müzik Koridoru, Gençlik ve Yaşam. For five years, from 2005, she presented the weekend programme Haber vizi.

In July 2016, she was a Turkish news anchor, working for state-run Turkish Radio and Television Corporation (TRT). During the attempted coup d'état, Karaş was forced to read out a declaration written by the soldiers attempting the coup, who had taken over the TRT building in Ankara. After a break in her career due to heart problems, Karaş resumed her broadcasting career on 6 January 2020, presenting the programme Dünya Gündemi. Karaş also gives seminars in Turkey and internationally on communication and body language.
