= Vincent Cochetel =

- Disappeared: 29 January 1998; Vladikavkaz, Russia
- Education: University of Paris
- Occupation: United Nations High Commissioner for Refugees official

Vincent Cochetel is a French official for the United Nations High Commissioner for Refugees (UNHCR) since 1986. As of 2016 he heads the European office of the organization. Previously, leading the organization's office in North Ossetia, he was kidnapped in January 1998 and held hostage until December the same year.

Obtaining a law degree from the University of Paris, Cochetel subsequently worked for the European Commission and the European Court of Human Rights before joining the UNHCR. He worked in Central and Eastern Europe, as well as in the Middle East, Western Africa and Caucasus.

As a UNHCR official in North Ossetia, he was kidnapped by three armed men in Vladikavkaz on 29 January 1998. During the time of his imprisonment he was mostly in a cave, tied to his bed with one hand, received little food, and got about 20 minutes of light every day. He was subject to interrogation and violence during the first days of captivity. The kidnappers demanded a ransom for Cochetel and negotiated with France and the United Nations, but according to the latter no ransom was ever paid. He was freed by Russian forces in December 1998.

He continued his work with UNHCR after his release, from 2002 in Geneva, and from 2005 as deputy director of Division of International Protection Services and Head of the Resettlement Service, before becoming regional ambassador of the UNHCR for the United States and the Caribbean, and later heading the European office.

During the European migration crisis he served as refugee coordinator for the UNHCR and in that capacity expressed concern that the European agreement with Turkey of March 2016—to return refugees who arrived in Greece to Turkey—violated the ban against mass expulsion in the European Convention of Human Rights.

== See also ==
- List of kidnappings
- Lists of solved missing person cases
