= AK Party–Gülen movement conflict =

Political conflict

- Part of Terrorism in Turkey
Date	2013–present
Location	Turkey and abroad
Status	Ongoing; low-intensity conflict; violence ceased: 2016 Turkish coup d'état failed; Freedom House has lowered Turkey's Freedom Rating every year since the 2016 coup attempt, and since 2018 has classified it as "Not Free".; 3,000,000 citizens of Turkey investigated for terrorism between 2016 and 2022 only; 511,000 Gulen followers detained for terror charges between 2016 and 2019 only.; Over 160,000 judges, teachers, police and civil servants suspended or dismissed.; Death of Fethullah Gülen in 20 October 2024; 2016–present purges in Turkey

Belligerents
Government of Turkey; Ministry of National Defence; Armed Forces; Land Forces; Air Force; Naval Forces; ÖKK; Ministry of the Interior; National Police; Riot Police; PÖH; Gendarmerie; JİTEM; Ministry of Foreign Affairs; AK Party	Gülen movement; Stated supporters of Fethullah Gülen in civil service, education, journalism, judiciary and military; Peace at Home Council; Later extended to opposition HDP and DEM Party supporters

Commanders and leaders
Recep Tayyip Erdoğan; (Turkey) Cevdet Yılmaz; (Turkey) İbrahim Kalın; Ali Yerlikaya; Yaşar Güler; Selçuk Bayraktaroğlu; Metin Tokel; Ercüment Tatlıoğlu; Ziya Cemal Kadıoğlu; Ali Çardakcı; Ömer Ertuğrul Erbakan; Mahmut Demirtaş; Former: (Turkey) Abdullah Gül; (Turkey) Ahmet Davutoğlu; (Turkey) Binali Yıldırım; (Turkey) Fuat Oktay; (Turkey) Hakan Fidan; Süleyman Soylu; Efkan Ala; Selami Altınok; Sebahattin Öztürk; Muammer Güler; İdris Naim Şahin; Hulusi Akar; Nurettin Canikli; Fikri Işık; İsmet Yılmaz; Vecdi Gönül; Necdet Özel; Hulusi Akar; Ümit Dündar; Yaşar Güler; Musa Avsever; Metin Gürak; Hayri Kıvrıkoğlu; Hulusi Akar; Salih Zeki Çolak; Yaşar Güler; Ümit Dündar; Musa Avsever; Selçuk Bayraktaroğlu; Emin Murat Bilgel; Bülent Bostanoğlu; Adnan Özbal; Mehmet Erten; Akın Öztürk; Abidin Ünal; Hasan Küçükakyüz; Atilla Gülan; Bekir Kalyoncu; Servet Yörük; Abdullah Atay; Galip Mendi; İbrahim Yaşar; Yaşar Güler; Arif Çetin; Halil Soysal; Zekai Aksakallı; Ahmet Ercan Çorbacı; Mehmet Kılıçlar; Mehmet Celalettin Lekesiz; Selami Altınok; Celal Uzunkaya; Mehmet Aktaş; Erol Ayyıldız	Fethullah Gülen #; Adil Öksüz; Akın Öztürk (POW); Mehmet Dişli (POW); Adem Huduti (POW) (alleged); Semih Terzi † (alleged); Bekir Ercan Van (POW) (alleged); İrfan Kızılaslan (POW) (alleged)

Units involved
Turkish Armed Forces; MİT; Turkish police and judiciary loyal to AK Party	Gülen supporters in judiciary, police, military (alleged); Gülenist media and educational networks

Casualties and losses
300 killed during coup attempt	Hundreds of thousands arrested, detained, or exiled; Over $12 billion of property linked to Gülen movement seized by the Turkish government; 1,043 private schools, 1,229 charities and foundations, 19 trade unions, 15 universities, and 35 medical institutions affiliated with Gülen shut down by the government
- The conflict escalated notably after the 2013 corruption scandal and culminated in the 2016 coup attempt, which the Turkish government blames on the Gülen movement.

The political conflict between the AK Parti-ruled Turkish government and the Gülen movement began in 2013.

With similarities in ideology, the AK Party and the Gülen Movement have long maintained a mutual non-aggression pact, with the latter using their judicial influence to limit opposition from Turkey's secular establishment to the AK Party's religious conservatism. Traditionally cosy relations between the AK Party government and the Gülen Movement turned sour in late 2013 after Gülen criticised the government's response to the Gezi Park protests, the corruption scandal and the government's policy of closing down Gülen's private "prep-schools".

The disagreement between the government and the movement escalated into a skirmish, with then-Prime Minister Recep Tayyip Erdoğan accusing the Gülen Movement of trying to bring down the government by using their influence over the judiciary to cause a government corruption scandal (known as the 17-25 investigations due to the dates on which it occurred). The government subsequently responded with large-scale reforms to the police and judiciary forces to purge Gülen's sympathisers from their positions. The conflict has been referred to as a coup attempt by pro-AK Party commentators and as a purge of judicial independence by critics.

Branding the movement as a 'parallel structure' and accusing Gülen of setting up an 'armed terrorist group', the government's efforts to purge the influence of the Gülen Movement has become a mainstream issue in Turkish politics and has sparked nationwide concerns over judicial independence and growing government authoritarianism in Turkey.

== Background ==
Relations between the Turkish government and the Gülen Movement date back to the premiership of Turgut Özal, who took office in 1983. The leader of the movement, Fethullah Gülen, has resided in Saylorsburg, Pennsylvania since 1999. Originating from a series of conferences and schools, the Movement gradually increased its influence in both the Turkish political and justice systems, with many of Gülen's supporters ending up occupying senior positions in the Judiciary. The Movement's influence in the Turkish government culminated in bringing forward the highly controversial Ergenekon and the Sledgehammer court cases against critics of the governing Justice and Development Party (AKP) in 2007.

The Gülen Movement's leader, Fethullah Gülen, managed to maintain a large number of supporters worldwide through the use of sympathetic media outlets, events, schools and charities. Several companies and organisations were affiliated with the movement until they were shut down, such as Samanyolu TV and Bank Asya. The movement is also supported by numerous political parties, mostly by the AKP between 2002 and 2013. Smaller parties such as the Democratic Progress Party and the Nation and Justice Party have also been accused of being sympathetic to Gülen's cause. The main opposition Republican People's Party was accused of maintaining informal links with the movement during the 2014 local elections. Independent ex-MPs, such as Hakan Şükür, are also seen as staunch followers of the movement.

== Belligerents ==
Turkish state	Gülen Movement
Government and state
61st Government of Turkey	
62nd Government of Turkey	
General Directorate of Security	
Supreme Board of Judges and Prosecutors (since 2015)	
National Intelligence Organisation (MİT)	
Political parties and organisations
Justice and Development Party (AKP)	1,043 private schools
Republican People's Party (2002-2014, 2015 onwards)	15 universities
Victory Party	1229 charities
Patriotic Party	35 medical institutions
Independent Turkey Party	19 trade unions
Homeland Party	
Media and companies
Sabah	Zaman
Yeni Şafak	Taraf (some columnists)
Yeni Akit	Bugün
Star	Millet
Türkiye	Cihan Haber Ajansı
Akşam	Bank Asya
TRT	Samanyolu TV
TRT Haber	Samanyolu Haber
Milat	Mehtap TV
Beyaz TV	Kanaltürk
TV8	Burç FM
NTV	Bugün TV
Kanal 7	Samanyolu Haber Radyo
ATV	Ebru TV
Kanal D	Sızıntı
A Haber	Samanyolu Avrupa
Show TV	Aksiyon
CNN Türk	Dünya Radyo
Star TV	Yeni Ümit
Daily Sabah	Today's Zaman
Milliyet	Dünya TV
Hürriyet	Radyo Mehtap
Habertürk	Irmak TV
Ülke TV	Kanaltürk Radyo
TGRT Haber	Cihan Radyo
24	Radyo Bamteli
Haber Global	MC EU TV
Key people
Recep Tayyip Erdoğan (Prime Minister, President)	Fethullah Gülen
Binali Yıldırım (Prime Minister)	Enes Kanter Freedom
Ahmet Davutoğlu (Foreign Minister, Prime Minister)	Ekrem Dumanlı
Abdullah Gül (President)	Hidayet Karaca
Emrullah İşler (Deputy Prime Minister)	Erhan Bilgili
Bülent Arınç (Deputy Prime Minister)	Ahmet Beyaz
Bekir Bozdağ (Justice Minister)	Hakan Şükür
Kenan İpek (Justice Minister)	İdris Bal (alleged)
Hakan Fidan (MİT Director, Foreign Minister)	İdris Naim Şahin (alleged)

== Start of the conflict ==
=== 2012 allegations ===
The first signs of a conflict came in February 2012, where the request for the National Intelligence Organisation (MİT) undersecretary Hakan Fidan to give evidence regarding the promotion of several AKP politicians known to be close to the Gülen Movement. In response to these claims, AKP deputy leader Hüseyin Çelik claimed that 'crows would laugh' at allegations that the Gülen Movement had taken over the state.

=== Gezi Park protests ===
After environmentalists protests in Gezi Park, Taksim Square turned into general protests against government authoritarianism in June 2013, Gülen began making statements from Pennsylvania that were regarded as some to be critical of the government's perceived heavy handed response. These were seen as the first major signs that the alliance between the AKP and the Gülen Movement were waning. The government's response to the protestors were criticised internationally, with the United States condemning the disproportionate violence and the European Union stalling Turkey's accession negotiations.

Turkish Prime Minister Recep Tayyip Erdoğan refused to negotiate with protestors, calling them 'a handful of looters' and accusing several protestors of backing violent terrorist groups such as DHKP-C. In response, Gülen released a statement claiming that the future of a park was not worth a life, calling for both sides to end their respective struggles and negotiate in a peaceful manner.

== Cram school (dershane) crisis ==
The conflict between the AKP and the Gülen Movement was fully underway after the government proposed a new law that would force several private cram schools, many of which are owned by the Gülen Movement, to close. In response, the pro-Gülen media began a strong campaign against the government's proposals. The Zaman newspaper, which is the most prominent pro-Gülen newspaper in Turkey and also one of the most widely circulated, carried headlines such as 'An educational coup' and 'Such a law was never even seen in the coup years'. Furthermore, the paper claimed that not even the employment sector wanted the colleges to be forcefully closed and also printed 1.5 million copies of a special edition accompanied by an additional brochure entitled 'Cram School' (Dershane). In response to Zaman's campaign, Prime Minister Recep Tayyip Erdoğan reiterated that his cabinet had agreed to put the new legislation to Parliament in November 2013. Ekrem Dumanlı, the general circulation manager of Zaman, wrote an open letter to Erdoğan in his column on 25 November 2013. On the same day, Fethullah Gülen himself released a statement entitled 'We will go on without stopping!'.

The law received parliamentary approval in February 2014 and took effect a year later in February 2015.

=== 2004 MGK controversy ===
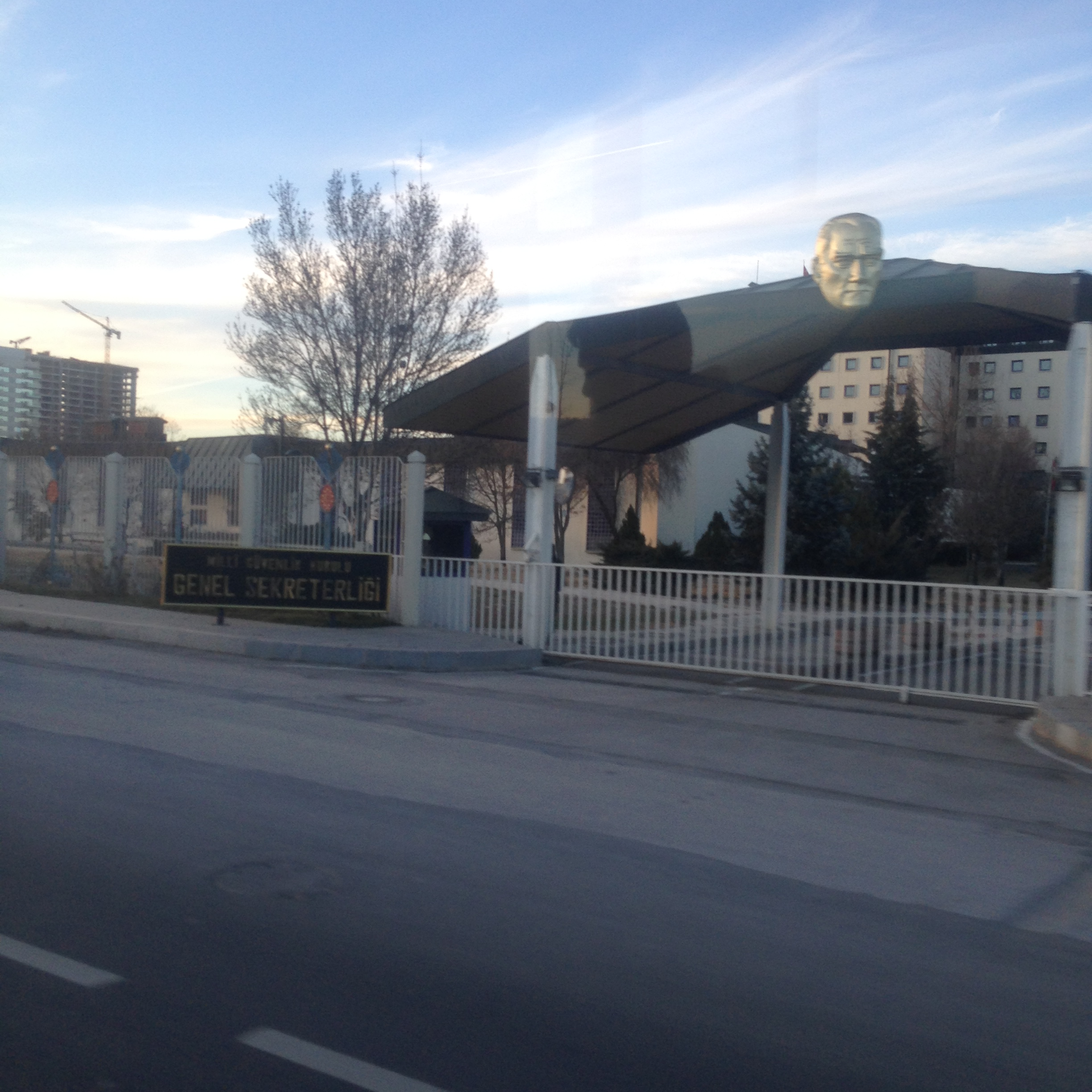
The National Security Council (MGK) building in Ankara

While the controversy was ongoing, editor Mehmet Baransu from the Taraf newspaper wrote an article on 28 November 2013 claiming that the decision to bring down the Gülen Movement had in fact been taken during a National Security Council (MGK) meeting in 2004. The article claimed that the formal decision to end the movement's political influence had been signed in August 2004 by both Prime Minister Erdoğan and President Abdullah Gül. Erdoğan's chief advisor Yalçın Akdoğan denied the claims, but his denial failed to convince the pro-Gülen media. Samanyolu TV alleged that a decision for the National Intelligence Organisation to maintain surveillance on individuals was included in the leaked documents.

In response to the leaking of MGK documents, Prime Minister Erdoğan made a statement reiterating his decision to abolish cram schools, while slamming the leak as an act of national treason.

=== Resignation of AKP MPs ===
The cram school crisis created a split within the AKP's parliamentary group, with pro-Gülen MPs openly voicing their concern over the new educational legislation. These included İdris Bal, who vocally criticised his party's policy on cram schools and was subsequently referred to the party's disciplinary board for suspension. In statements made to the press, Bal had claimed that closing cram schools would mean many youths would be unable to make it to university. When his imminent suspension became certain, Bal resigned from the AKP. He later formed the Democratic Progress Party (DGP) in November 2014, with many media outlets describing the party as the party of the Gülen Movement. Before the June 2015 general election however, Bal resigned as the leader of his new party, accusing the pro-Gülen media of limiting his party's ability to reach out to voters. This cast doubt over initial claims that the DGP was a pro-Gülen political party.

Another key resignation was that of Hakan Şükür in December 2013, who is openly a follower of Gülen and strongly critical of his party's cram school policy. Şükür revealed after his resignation that he had been to visit Gülen on numerous occasions while still an AKP Member of Parliament, telling Gülen that he wanted to resign from his party. He claimed that Gülen had delayed his decision.

== 2013 government corruption scandal ==
=== 17 December operations ===
On 17 December 2013, a wave of arrests targeting businessmen, bankers and most notably the sons of four serving cabinet ministers in Erdoğan's government were arrested during an anti-corruption operation. The allegations that a banknote counting machine had been found in serving Interior Minister Muammer Güler's son's house, as well as the revelation that large amounts of money had been hidden in shoe boxes in the house of the CEO of Halkbank caused a media storm. A total of 80 people were arrested, with 24 formally charged.

Following the anti-corruption operations, Deputy Prime Minister Bülent Arınç issued a statement saying that the government knew who was behind the operations and that any intervention of a group within the governance of the state would be dealt with accordingly. Erdoğan called the arrests a 'dirty operation'.

On the same day as the operation, five branch managers from the Istanbul Directorate of Security were removed from their posts. Two new prosecutors, Ekrem Aydıner and Mustafa Erol, were assigned to deal with the corruption cases, alongside the existing two prosecutors Celal Kara and Mehmet Yüzgeç due to the extensiveness of the case. Kara and Yüzgeç, the two existing prosecutors, were late removed from the case. Mustafa Erol later resigned from the case. The entire corruption investigation was subsequently dealt by a single prosecutor, namely Ekrem Aydıner. The fact that only one prosecutor was now presiding over a case where two prosecutors had originally been assigned due to a heavy workload led to allegations that Aydıner was acting on the in favour of the government's demands.

Following the operation, the government branded the investigation as a 'planned psychological attack', 'an illegal group within the state' and 'dirty games being played within and outside the Turkish state'. While the government did not name the Gülen Movement specifically, Gülen recorded a message full of religious imprecations. Most media and political commentators claimed that the government's accusations were clearly directed at either the Gülen Movement, or a segment within the Gülen Movement. The movement had by now been branded a 'parallel structure' operating within the state.

=== Cabinet reshuffle and resignations ===
The three ministers that were incriminated in the corruption scandal, namely Zafer Çağlayan, Erdoğan Bayraktar and Muammer Güler, resigned from their cabinet ministers. Having also been mentioned in the corruption investigations, Egemen Bağış also lost his position in the ensuring reshuffle. Bayraktar called for the Prime Minister to resign to ease the political tensions that had resulted from the corruption scandal, though later apologised for his statement.

As a result of his party's perceived corruption, former Interior minister İdris Naim Şahin resigned from his party and called for the Prime Minister to resign. Şahin later established the Nation and Justice Party (MİLAD Party) in November 2014, with this party also being branded as pro-Gülen by media outlets close to the AKP. Şahin, like former DGP leader İdris Bal, resigned from his party before the 2015 general election after failing to seal an alliance deal with the Felicity Party and the Great Union Party.

On 27 December 2015, Ertuğrul Günay, Haluk Özdalga and Erdal Kalkan all resigned from the AKP.

=== HSYK controversy and 25 December operation ===
Realising that the ministers involved in the 17 December operations did not initially know that investigations had begun into them, the government made it compulsory for such investigations to be reported to the most senior officials in government. The Supreme Board of Judges and Prosecutors (HSYK) ruled this requirement unconstitutional.

On 25 December, the same day that the HSYK ruled that the government's demands were unconstitutional, prosecutor Muammer Akkaş issued an arrest warrant for 30 more individuals on charges of corruption, yet the Istanbul Directorate of Security refused to make the arrests. As a result, Akkaş issued a statement claiming that he was being prevented from doing his job. The government responded by accusing Akkaş of attempting to begin a second operation through unlawful means, thus taking him off the case and allegedly giving it to prosecutor Turan Çolakkadı. In the end, the case was transferred to five other prosecutors.

On 26 December, Prime Minister Erdoğan claimed that Akkaş had disgraced the judiciary by issuing such a statement and claimed that the HSYK had committed a crime by refusing the government's demands to notify senior ministers of investigations. He claimed that had he had the right, he would have 'tried' the HSYK himself, but claimed that the people would have the right to judge. A day later, the Turkish Council of State voted down the government's demands, with Erdoğan subsequently issuing a statement saying 'what needs to be done will be done, and then you will see' and claiming that the judicial changes proposed in the 2010 constitutional referendum had been a mistake. Several pro-government ministers claimed that the judicial setback was the last open attack against the AKP by the Gülen Movement.

A new law that would bring the HSYK directly under the control of the Ministry of Justice was passed on 1 February 2014 despite several breakouts of violence between government and opposition MPs.

=== Accusations of a 'judicial coup' ===
On 31 December, Deputy Prime Minister Ali Babacan, who was later himself accused of being a supporter of Gülen, claimed that the events of 17 December 2013 had been a mini-coup attempt. An intelligence report for the Prime Minister was leaked on the same day, with claims that the 'parallel structure' had branches in 27 provinces and had over 2,000 police officers and several academics, journalists and bankers under its control.

President Abdullah Gül issued a statement on 4 January 2014 claiming that a state within a state was 'absolutely unacceptable'. Erdoğan claimed that the corruption scandal had been an attempt to tarnish the AKP's image, to worsen his relations with President Gül, to sabotage the ongoing solution process with Kurdish rebels and to stop Turkey's growth.

A new spate of anti-corruption operations began on 7 January, in provinces such as İzmir, Amasya and Istanbul. These operations were mocked by the pro-AKP media.

== MİT lorry scandal ==
On 1 January, lorries allegedly carrying weapons and bound for Syria were stopped in Adana, while a similar convoy of lorries were stopped on 19 June in Hatay. The prosecutor Aziz Takçı, who ordered the lorries to be stopped and searched for weapons after receiving a tip-off, was later removed from his position and branded as a member of Gülen's 'parallel structure'. The government attempted to cover up the lorries' cargo and to stop the searching of their contents on both occasions, with it becoming apparent that they belonged to the National Intelligence Organisation (MİT). The accusation that MİT lorries were carrying weapons into Syria created yet another scandal, especially at a time when the government in the centre of international controversy for their policy of inaction against Islamic State militants. Erdoğan stated that the contents of the lorries were a national secret, but later claimed that they had been carrying humanitarian aid to the Turkmen population in Syria. He branded the prosecutor and gendarmerie troops involved in the search of the lorries as parallel structure sympathisers and many were subsequently arrested.

== Government reforms ==
=== Police and Judiciary ===
Within 35 days of the 17 December anti-corruption operations, 5,000 police officers had been designated to positions elsewhere in the Directorate of Security. Interior Minister Efkan Ala made a live statement claiming that 1,000 officers had been moved to new positions and 5,000 officers had been moved in a routine procedure. He claimed that this was a small percentage of re-designations compared to the total workforce of 260,000 officers.

As changes to the HSYK were being debated in Parliament, several members of the HSYK that openly criticised the new legislation were removed from their posts. In the Istanbul Çağlayan Justice Palace, there was an overhaul of staff, with 90 out of 192 prosecutors being reassigned from their original positions. Prosecutors dealing with the sledgehammer and Ergenekon trials were also involved in the mass overhaul. The prosecutors dealing with the 17 December operations were removed from their positions entirely. Erdoğan later made a speech alleging that the Gülen Movement had taken over the judiciary and claimed that they had made a mistake in pushing for constitutional changes in the 2010 referendum. He further claimed that the HSYK had allowed phones to be wiretapped at will, which was why the government had put forward such significant reforms.

The government also abolished courts with special privileges (özel yetkili mahkemeler, ÖYM) as part of a democratisation package.

=== 2014 MİT reform law ===
Besides tightening control over the judiciary, the government brought forward a new law that gave significant new powers to the National Intelligence Organisation (MİT). The new law would give the Council of Ministers the right to assign duties to MİT operatives on issues of counter-terrorism, national or external security. The term 'national security' raised the most concern due to its vagueness, meaning that a minister could potentially assign the MİT to conduct an operation against any political party, group, organisation or institution simply by claiming that they were a national security threat.

The new law also gave the MİT the power to confiscate or demand access to any form of information, material or equipment contained by an organisation by overriding any other laws protecting privacy. Furthermore, leaking MİT documents was made a new crime, with long jail terms imposed on individuals who disclose information on the MİT's activities. The MİT was also given the right to conduct unlimited surveillance and a legal ground was instituted for talks between the MİT and imprisoned PKK leader Abdullah Öcalan.

=== 2014 Internet censorship law ===
The government passed a new controversial internet censorship law in 2014 that gave the Presidency of Telecommunication and Communication (TİB) to block websites without court authorisation should they reveal private or 'insulting' content. The law also made censorship much easier while also forcing websites to keep data of their users for a prolonged period of time and to disclose such information should the TİB require it. The new law was described as an open attack on social media due to the strengthening of existing censorship laws, with the lack of checks and balances on the TİB's decisions also being criticised. Social media had a significant impact on the Gezi Park protests and the organisation of other anti-government demonstrations.

A week before the 2014 local elections, Twitter and YouTube were blocked using the new powers given to the TİB.

=== Release of Ergenekon and Balyoz prisoners ===
The Sledgehammer and Ergenekon cases were brought forward, allegedly as a joint effort between the AKP and Gülen Movement, in 2007 against critics of the AKP that threatened the party's hold on power. Such individuals included several military officers and journalists, including former Chief of General Staff Çetin Doğan. The cases were both riddled with claims of irregularities, though many defendants were either sentenced to life in prison for attempting a coup or charged while in jail.

In February 2014, a law limited the time in which an accused could be imprisoned while formally charged to five years, meaning several Sledgehammer or Ergenekon defendants were released. An Istanbul court ordered the release of 230 people after ruling that their rights had been breached. In 2015, Erdoğan claimed that the entire country had been misled and deceived during the Sledgehammer case.

== Tape recording revelations ==
On the evening of 25 February 2014, a recording was posted on YouTube allegedly featuring Prime Minister Recep Tayyip Erdoğan telling his son Necmettin Bilal Erdoğan to 'nullify' all the cash kept in their home due to the ongoing operations occurring in other government ministers' homes. The video received more than 3 million hits in less than 24 hours. The Prime Minister called the tape a 'dastardly, shameless and nasty montage', adding that there was nothing that he could not give a justification to. He claimed that the perpetrators behind the montage were members of the parallel structure (i.e. the Gülen Movement) and committed to beginning legal proceedings into the recording, as well as proving that it was a forgery.

The recording was broadcast in Parliament by opposition leader Kemal Kılıçdaroğlu, who claimed that new revelations would emerge in the following days and called for the Prime Minister to 'grab a helicopter and flee the country or resign'. Legal proceedings began into Kılıçdaroğlu for broadcasting the recording to Parliament, with him being accused of acquiring the recording through illegal methods. Despite the investigation later being abandoned, the court decided to restart the case in June 2015. The MHP leader Devlet Bahçeli claimed that the tapes put minds into shock, adding that the unjustifiable recording would go down in Turkish history as a disgrace.

=== Investigations into possible forgery ===
Despite claiming that the recordings were forged and vowing to bring forward evidence to prove this to be true, the government failed to bring forward proof in the first few days after a recording. The pro-government newspaper Star claimed that the government had received a report from an American company (John Marshall Media) confirming the recording to be a fake. However, the company CEO later took to Facebook stating that they did deal with legal verifications of tape recordings and stated that the report bearing their company name was a fake, announcing that they would look into possible legal action into their brand name being used unlawfully.

The main institution the government turned to for a report confirming the forgery was the Scientific and Technological Research Council of Turkey (TÜBİTAK), which examined the recording but failed to produce any proof that it was a fake. As a result, six TÜBİTAK experts at were fired in late February, with Minister Fikri Işık accusing them of supporting Gülen and accusing the parallel structure in general of infiltrating TÜBİTAK. In June 2014, TÜBİTAK eventually produced a report confirming the recordings to be a fake, though the report was found to be unconvincing and 'funny' by some vocal experts. The CHP claimed that the technology that TÜBİTAK had used (syllable analysis) to produce their report did not actually exist, taking the issue to Parliament.

=== Wiretapping claims ===
Energy and Natural Resources Minister Taner Yıldız claimed that the recording had been made for an Islamist organisation called 'Selam'. Pro government newspapers Sabah, Star and Yeni Şafak accused the 'parallel structure' of wiretapping 20,000, 2,280 and 7,000 people respectively. Their estimates widely increased in the following days, with Yeni Şafak claiming that the true number was above 100,000. The Presidency of Telecommunication and Communication (TİB) stated in March that 509,000 phones had been wiretapped between 2012 and 2013, though the TİB only had court warrants to wiretap 217,863 phones.

The former Vice President of TÜBİTAK, Hasan Palaz, and two other former TÜBİTAK workers were arrested for alleged wiretapping of the Prime Ministry, though Palaz was later released. The Vice President of the TİB Osman Nihat Şen was also arrested. A total of 26 people were arrested on charges of wiretapping and spying, including five police officers.

== 2014 local elections ==
The local elections on 30 March 2014 was the first election since the conflict began, with the AKP facing a serious test of confidence following the corruption charges. With 42.87% of the vote, the AKP won the elections with a significant proportion of councillors and mayors up for election. The CHP, hoping for a large boost in their vote share after running a fierce anti-corruption campaign, won just 26.34% of the vote (only 0.36% up from their 2011 election result). Many opposition members alleged widespread electoral fraud, especially in Ankara and Antalya, with electricity cuts and provocations during vote counting causing heavy controversy.

In a balcony speech declaring the AKP's victory, Erdoğan claimed that the population had given him a mandate to continue his fight against the parallel structure. He further stated that the parallel structure's treachery would not be forgotten and that he had been a victim of his own good intentions, which was a perceived reference to the AKP's traditionally cosy relationship with Gülen. Finally, Erdoğan pledged to have Gülen's sympathisers tried before the people and not the courts that they had 'infiltrated'.

== Accusations of armed terrorism ==
With numerous prosecutors, soldiers, police officers and journalists known to be close to the Gülen Movement being arrested on charges of 'setting up an armed terrorist group', accusations of terrorism against the Movement have increased. A retired judge and a defendant during the Sledgehammer case, Ahmet Zeki Üçok claimed that the parallel structure had formed a terrorist cell named 'Ötüken'. It was claimed alleged that the cell had played a part in the assassination of Hrant Dink, the Zirve Publishing House massacre, the Turkish Council of State shooting and civil unrest in the Gezi Park protests. A journalist from Akşam, the newspaper in which the allegations had been made, resigned.

== Controversies ==
The conflict has caused widespread controversy both politically and internationally, mainly revolving around Erdoğan's political polarising response and the uncertainty of the future of Turkish judicial independence.

=== Domestic opposition ===
The Republican People's Party (CHP), which forms the main opposition, was heavily critical of the government for their reforms to the judiciary and the corruption scandal. It was perceived by some that the newspaper Zaman had begun implicitly supporting the CHP in order to sustain the Gülen Movement's influence in politics and parliament. After opposition MPs began receiving letters from Gülen's supporters urging them to oppose the cram school law, the CHP took the law closing the schools to court. After the 2013 corruption scandal, the CHP strongly condemned the government and called for Erdoğan's resignation, to which the Prime Minister responded by accusing CHP leader Kemal Kılıçdaroğlu of collaborating with Gülen. The CHP also accused the government of violating the independence of the judiciary with their reforms following the scandal. During the 2014 local election campaign, the CHP took a strong anti-corruption stance while the AKP accused the CHP of being pro-Gülen. The CHP's former spokesperson Birgül Ayman Güler resigned after accusing her party of allying itself with the Gülen Movement. The CHP has also defended imprisoned Zaman journalists and have visited them in prison, while also coming out in support for Bank Asya during the government's attempt to shut it down. These actions fuelled accusations that the CHP had now become the party of the Gülen Movement. Allegedly expecting many Gülen-supporting AKP voters to defect during the local elections, the CHP only won 26.34%, an increase of just 0.36% since the 2011 general election. However, the CHP has been historically heavily critical of the Gülen Movement, having been strongly against the judicial misconduct during the Sledgehammer and Ergenekon trials. Many Sledgehammer and Ergenekon defendants such as Mustafa Balbay are now CHP MPs, having been elected in an attempt to free them from prison.

=== International concerns ===
Concerns have been raised by the US Congress, the European Union and several other human rights groups over the Turkish government's tightening control over the judiciary, as well as increased government censorship of social media. In January 2014, the EU issued a call for Turkey to preserve press freedom and judicial independence, criticising the large-scale reorganisation of judges and the censorship of social media networks. In January 2015, the EU Enlargement Commissioner Štefan Füle called on Ankara to restore judicial independence in order to make progress in its accession negotiations.

The United States Congress has urged Secretary of State John Kerry to push Turkey for a free press after the raids on pro-Gülen newspapers that saw the arrest of Samanyolu TV director Hidayet Karaca and Zaman editor-in-chief Ekrem Dumanlı. Following the police raids on pro-Gülen media, the US Congress condemned Turkey for an "assault on democracy".

== Purge of the Gülenist movement in Turkey (2016–present) ==
In 2016 a faction within the military loyal not to the state, but allegedly to Fethullah Gülen, tried to overthrow the Turkish government. 251 Turks were killed resisting the coup. On 19 July 2016, Turkey has made a formal request to the U.S. for the extradition of Gülen movement leader Fethullah Gülen. In rebuttal of these attempted-coup allegations, the London-based Hizmet Centre, a Gülen-movement source, said that Gülen had remarked within a speech broadcast August 13, 2017 "about a rumour of a plot, that some important public figures will be assassinated in Turkey, and the blame will be put on the members of the Hizmet [Gülen] movement. Gülen’s message...was allegedly distorted by pro-Erdogan and anti-Gülen media circles as 'an order of assassination to his followers'".

Turkey's Justice Ministry said on July 13 that 50,510 people have been arrested and 169,013 have been charged with complicity with the coup attempt. Many of those arrested or charged and are associated with the Gülen movement. The government has charged people merely associated with the Gülen movement through such means as possession of an account with Bank Asya, a Gülen-movement affiliated bank, or subscribing to Zaman, a Gülen-movement affiliated newspaper.

== See also ==
- Recep Tayyip Erdoğan (Prime Minister of Turkey (2003–2014) and President of Turkey (2014–present)
- Fethullah Gülen (leader of the Gülen movement)
- Turkish government
- Gülen movement
- 2013 corruption scandal in Turkey
- 2014 National Intelligence Organisation scandal in Turkey
- 2014 Turkish local elections
- 2014 Turkish presidential election
- June 2015 Turkish general election
- November 2015 Turkish general election
- 2016 Turkish coup d'etat attempt
- 2016–present purges in Turkey
