= Turkey–Islamic State conflict =

Conflict since 2013

- Part of Terrorism in Turkey, the Spillover of the Syrian civil war and the War against the Islamic State
Date	11 May 2013 – present (13 years, 6 months and 6 days)
Location	Turkey, Syria, Iraq and Africa
Status	Ongoing: Terrorist attacks by IS in Turkey or on its citizens from 2013–2016; Turkish attacks on IS in 2014–2016; Turkish occupation of northern Syria

Belligerents
Turkey; Ministry of National Defence; Special Forces Command; Turkish Armed Forces; Land Forces; Air Force; Naval Forces; Ministry of Interior; Gendarmerie; JİTEM; National Police; Riot Police; PÖH; (no border) Ministry of Foreign Affairs	Islamic State; Military of IS; Dokumacılar (2014–2017); Gaziantep terror cell; Foreign volunteers; Turkish volunteers; Iraq Province; Sham Province; Turkey Province; Kurdistan Province; Sahil Province; West Africa Province; Central Africa Province

Commanders and leaders
(Turkey) Recep Tayyip Erdoğan (since 2014); (Turkey) Cevdet Yılmaz (since 2023); (Turkey) İbrahim Kalın (since 2023); Ali Yerlikaya (since 2023); Yaşar Güler (since 2023); Selçuk Bayraktaroğlu (since 2025); Metin Tokel (since 2023); Ercüment Tatlıoğlu (since 2022); Ziya Cemal Kadıoğlu (since 2023); Ali Çardakcı (since 2024); Ömer Ertuğrul Erbakan (since 2019); Mahmut Demirtaş (since 2024); Former: (Turkey) Ahmet Davutoğlu; (Turkey) Binali Yıldırım; (Turkey) Fuat Oktay; (Turkey) Hakan Fidan; Süleyman Soylu; Efkan Ala; Selami Altınok; Sebahattin Öztürk; Muammer Güler; Hulusi Akar; Nurettin Canikli; Fikri Işık; İsmet Yılmaz; Vecdi Gönül; Necdet Özel; Hulusi Akar; Ümit Dündar; Musa Avsever; Metin Gürak; Hayri Kıvrıkoğlu; Hulusi Akar; Salih Zeki Çolak; Ümit Dündar; Musa Avsever; Emin Murat Bilgel; Bülent Bostanoğlu; Adnan Özbal; Mehmet Erten; Akın Öztürk; Abidin Ünal; Hasan Küçükakyüz; Atilla Gülan; Bekir Kalyoncu; Servet Yörük; Abdullah Atay; Galip Mendi; İbrahim Yaşar; Arif Çetin; Halil Soysal; Zekai Aksakallı; Ahmet Ercan Çorbacı; Mehmet Kılıçlar; Mehmet Celalettin Lekesiz; Selami Altınok; Celal Uzunkaya; Mehmet Aktaş; Erol Ayyıldız	(Islamic State) Abu Hafs al-Hashimi al-Qurashi (2023–present) (Islamic State) Abu al-Hussein al-Husseini al-Qurashi † (2022–23) (Islamic State) Abu al-Hasan al-Hashimi al-Qurashi † (2022) (Islamic State) Abu Ibrahim al-Hashimi al-Qurashi † (2019–22) (Islamic State) Abu Bakr al-Baghdadi X (2014–19) (Islamic State) Ilhami Bali; Yunus Durmaz † (Islamic State) Abu Husen Tunusi † (Islamic State) Abu Ensari † (Islamic State) Abu Khalid al-Urduni † (Islamic State) Abu Ja'fr Dagestani † (Islamic State) Neil Prakash (POW); Abu Ibrahim Al-Faransi (POW)

Strength
423,299 military personnel 182,805 Gendarmes (2014 figures)	IS military: 15,000–20,000 (late 2016); Dokumacılar: 60–70; Gaziantep terror cell: 150+ fighters

Casualties and losses
In Syria and Iraq; 71 soldiers killed (Operation Euphrates Shield); In Turkey; 6 police officers killed	In Syria and Iraq (Islamic State) 3,500+ killed or captured (per Turkey); In Turkey (Islamic State) 7+ killed, 2 captured
- 304 civilians killed and 1,182 wounded by IS attacks across Turkey between 2014–2017; 540+ Syrian civilians killed during the Turkish military intervention

The Turkey–Islamic State conflict are a series of attacks and clashes between the state of Turkey and the Islamic State. Turkey joined the War against the Islamic State in 2016, after the Islamic State attacks in Turkey. The Turkish Armed Forces' Operation Euphrates Shield was aimed against both the Islamic State and the SDF. Part of Turkish-occupied northern Syria, around Jarabulus and al-Bab, was taken after Turkey drove the Islamic State out of it.

== Etymology ==
Turkey like some other countries, such as France and the UK uses the name DAEŞ, DEAŞ, or DAİŞ, which is the group's Arabic acronym for (Dawlat al-Islam fil-Iraq wal-Sham) which the Islamic State considers as a derogatory insult. The Turkish abbreviation for the Islamic State is IŞİD (Irak ve Şam İslam Devleti).

== Background ==
=== Allegations of Turkish cooperation and support ===
Ever since the foundation of the Islamic State in June 2014, numerous Western media reports and the PKK have stated that Turkey collaborated with and supported the Islamic State. Several of the allegation have focused on Turkish businessman and politician Berat Albayrak, who has faced calls for his prosecution in the United States.

In June 2014, when the Islamic State kidnapped 49 Turkish diplomats from the Turkish consulate in Mosul, a columnist said that Turkey now was "paying the price of its collaboration with terrorists", with "terrorists" referring to the Islamist factions in the Turkish-backed FSA.

Some news websites in late 2014 also criticised Turkey for "doing nothing" against the Islamic State.

In April 2018 an article was published by Foreign Policy in which it was stated that in 2013 alone, some 30,000 militants illegally crossed into Turkish land, establishing the so-called "jihadi highway", as the Syria–Turkey border was popular among foreign volunteers illegally crossing it to join the Islamic State in Syria. Furthermore, it was claimed that wounded Islamic State militants were treated in private-owned hospitals across southeastern Turkey. Among those receiving care was one of the top deputies of Islamic State chieftain Abu Bakr al-Baghdadi, Ahmet el-H, who was treated in a private hospital in Sanliurfa in August 2014.

=== IS offensive on Kobanî ===
On 29 November 2014, reports emerged of the Islamic State fighters allegedly launching an assault on Kobanî from Turkish territory. Kurdish sources in Kobanî alleged that Islamic State fighters attacked Kobanî from Turkish territory, and that the assault began with a vehicle driven by a suicide bomber coming from Turkish territory. During the attack, a group of Islamic State fighters were seen atop granary silos on the Turkish side of the border. According to the German news outlet Der Spiegel, Islamic State fighters also attacked YPG positions near the border gate from Turkish soil. According to SOHR, YPG fighters in turn crossed the Turkish border and attacked ISIL positions on Turkish soil, before pulling back to Syria. Soon afterwards, the Turkish Army was deployed and cleared both out from the border crossing and silos area. The Turkish government rejected all those claims.

Turkish Prime Minister Ahmet Davutoglu later claimed that "Turkey is the first country which designated ISIS as a terrorist organization and refuted the allegations which claimed Turkey had involvement in the Kobanî attacks."

== Conflict ==
=== 2013 ===
==== May 11: Potential IS attack ====
On 11 May 2013, two car bombs exploded in the town of Reyhanlı, Hatay Province, Turkey, close to the busiest land border post (Bab al-Hawa Border Crossing) with Syria. 51 people were killed and 140 injured in the attack, the deadliest single act of terrorism to occur on Turkish soil up until then—to be surpassed by the 10 October 2015 Ankara bombings with 102 mm.

Who is responsible for the attack is, as of yet, unclear: politicians, authorities, media, suspects have named at least six possibilities. The Islamic State, during late September 2013, suddenly claimed the 11 May 2013 attack. In response to the attacks and claim, the Turkish government sent air and ground forces to increase the already heavy military presence in the area.

=== 2014 ===
==== January 28: Turkish attack on IS convoy ====
On 28 January 2014, the Turkish air force, according to few sources, performed an airstrike on Syrian territory hitting a pickup, a truck and a bus in an Islamic State convoy, killing 11 militants and emir Abu Ja'afar ad-Daghistani. Conflicting reports however said it was fire from Turkish tanks and artillery hitting the Islamic State vehicles, after mortar shells had accidentally landed in Turkey.

==== March 20: IS attack on Turkish security officials ====
On 20 March, three Islamic State militants emerging from a taxi opened fire with an AK-47 (some reports say Glock automatics) and lobbed a hand grenade, killing a Gendarmerie soldier and a policeman who were conducting routine checks on the Ulukışla–Adana expressway, and injuring four Gendarmerie. The attackers were wounded in return fire but got away. Two of the attackers were apprehended at Eminlik village, where villagers, thinking they were wounded Syrian civilian refugees, took them to the local medical clinic. Benyamin Xu (German), Çendrim Ramadani (Swiss) and Muhammed Zakiri (Macedonian) were all sentenced to life in prison for the attack.

==== June 11: IS kidnaps 49 Turks ====
In June 2014, Turkey officially designated the Islamic State and the al-Nusra Front as terrorist organizations.

Also on 11 June 2014, the Islamic State captured the Turkish consulate in Mosul and held all of its 49 workers as hostages. This happened during the June 2014 takeover of Mosul.

The hostages were freed in mid-September 2014 after Turkish authorities had paid the ransom and swapped the hostages for 180 Islamic State militants who had been apprehended after being illegally in Turkey for medical treatment. Turkey had denied paying the ransom.

==== September 5: Turkey enters US-led coalition ====
On 5 September 2014, Turkey entered a US-led coalition, CJTF–OIR vowing to 'join forces to fight ISIL'.

==== November 22: Turkish training of Peshmerga ====
During early November 2014, in a move that surprised many, Turkish soldiers began training Peshmerga fighters in northern Iraq. A Turkish official referred to it 'as part of the [shared] struggle against ISIL'.

=== 2015 ===
==== January 6: Istanbul attack ====
On 6 January 2015, a bomb is detonated in Istanbul's Sultanahmet Square. One police officer got killed while another officer was injured.

==== March 6: ISIL threatens the Suleyman Shah Tomb ====
Previously in March 2014, the Islamic State had threatened to attack the Tomb of Suleyman Shah (the grandfather of Osman I), although they were not near the area. In early 2015, it was reported that the Islamic State was coming closer to the tomb site, Turkey on 21 February 2015 decided send a military convoy of a hundred armored vehicles and 570 troops, and remove the tomb and place it some 27 km northward, still in Syria but much closer to the Turkish border.

==== June 5: Diyarbakır attack ====
On 5 June 2015, just 48 hours before the June 2015 general election, two separate bombs exploded at an electoral rally in Diyarbakır held by the pro-Kurdish Peoples' Democratic Party (HDP). Four were killed and dozens were injured. The Dokumacılar were blamed for the attack.

==== July 20: Bomb attack Suruç ====
On 20 July 2015, the municipal cultural center in Suruç in the southeastern province of Şanlıurfa was bombed. 34 people, mostly university-aged students planning to reconstruct the Syrian border town of Kobanî, were killed and more than 100 people were injured. The Islamic State claimed the attack a couple of days later. According to journalist Serkan Demirtas, this attack might have been the attack in which Turkey considered a "declaration of war" from the Islamic State and began taking them much more seriously afterwards.

==== July 23: Turkish air bases for US to use against IS ====
On 22–23 July, the U.S. reached an agreement with Turkey for American warplanes striking the Islamic State in Syria to be stored in the Turkish air bases at İncirlik in Adana Province and Diyarbakır in Diyarbakır Province. Turkey confirmed the deal on 24 July. US Gen. Joseph L. Votel, head of the Pentagon's Special Operations Command, on 24 July thanked Turkey for its permission to use the Turkish air bases: "It provides additional flexibility and agility in addressing this enemy ISIL (...) It also means that Turkey has taken another step forward in being more committed to helping us."

==== July 23: Elbeyli incident ====
On 23 July 2015 at 13:30 local time, five gunmen, identified by the Turkish military as being Islamic State militants, attacked a Turkish border outpost in the border town of Elbeyli, Kilis Province, killing one Turkish soldier (Yalçın Nane) and wounding five.

In reaction, Turkish forces chased the militants into Syria, and Turkish tanks and artillery shelled Islamic State strongholds in northern Syria, killing at least one militant and obliterating a number of vehicles.

Turkish tanks also bombarded a small (abandoned) Syrian village north of Azaz, Aleppo, in which the Islamic State militants were thought to be hiding, and killed or wounded several of the militants who were trying to take cover there.

Around 7 pm on 23 July, reports stated that 100 Islamic State militants had been killed, but those reports were criticised by anti-government newspapers. The Turkish Armed Forces later stated that all five militants who had attacked the Turkish army in Elbeyli had been killed.

==== July 24: 'Turkish–American zone in northern Syria' ====
On 24 July 2015, the Turkish, English-language newspaper/website Hürriyet Daily News, referring to anonymous "Turkish sources", reported that the deal, made public by the United States the previous day, in which Turkey gave permission to the US to use Turkish air bases, came with the US agreeing to let Turkey set up a "partial no-fly zone" in Northern Syria of 90 km wide, between Syria's Mare' and Jarabulus, 40 to 50 km deep.

Neither Turkey nor the US has officially confirmed the deal on the Turkish buffer zone – a no-fly zone protected by Turkish and CJTF–OIR forces – which would provide a safe haven for refugees and deny the SDF access to crucial territory. In the no-fly zone, SAA jets will not be permitted, Hürriyet stated.

Hürriyet Daily News suggested on 24 July that the no-fly zone was intended to "prevent radical groups such as ISIL or the (...) al-Nusra Front from gaining the mentioned land". While no official statement was released on the supposed deal on a 'no-fly zone', the British The Guardian speculated the deal to be part of Turkey's preoccupation with "thwarting Kurdish separatist ambitions in lawless parts of Iraq and Syria" and a prelude to the US allowing a possible Turkish military action against the YPG in the area.

Turkish website Hürriyet Daily News on 25 July, again referring to unmentioned "sources", changed their earlier narrative and vocabulary. Their story now ran as that Turkey and the US had agreed on an "ISIL-free zone" in northern Syria, 98 kilometers long between Mare' and Jarabulus and 40 km deep, an area at that moment largely under Islamic State control, from which the US and Turkey planned to eliminate all "jihadist terrorists". That goal would be pursued by air strikes mainly by the U.S., for which the US had been given permission (on 23 July) to use the Turkish air base İncirlik; Turkey would, if necessary, assist with long-range ground artillery.

The unmentioned 'sources' now reportedly had stressed that the zone should not be called a 'security zone' nor a 'safe zone' nor a 'no-fly zone' because such names might give the wrong impression to the Syrian government that the Turkish-American objective in this area was to fight the Assad government.

The 'sources' reportedly had further stated that Turkey and the US planned that the zone, once cleared from the Islamic State presence, would be handed to the Free Syrian Army, which would prevent the AANES' PYD-led government from taking control of the region and at the same time create a safe zone for Syrian refugees.

==== July 24: Turkish airstrikes on IS ====
On 24 and 25 July, Turkey carried out three waves of airstrikes on the Islamic State in Syria. These attacks were motivated as an effort to prevent a planned attack on Turkey and to be a "safeguard [for the Turkish] national security". Considering its name 'Martyr Yalçın', it is likely a revenge for an alleged Islamic State attack the previous day killing a Turkish soldier named Yalçın Nane.

Two Islamic State headquarters and a gathering point, and several more Islamic State locations were struck, and reportedly 35 militants dying; some Turkish F-16 jets thereby violated Syrian airspace. But according to the Syrian Observatory of Human Rights, Turkish troops killed 11 IS militants.

==== July 25: Anti-IS police raids in Turkey ====
On 25 July, Turkey engaged in police raids in 22 provinces in Turkey targeting suspected members of the Islamic State, the PKK, the DHKP/C and PKK's youth wing YGD/H.

590 suspects from all of the groups targeted had been arrested by 25 July. The arrests included one Islamic State member who was allegedly in the middle of planning a suicide bombing in Konya.

==== October 10: Ankara bombings ====
The 10 October 2015 Ankara bombings cost the lives of 107 people, more than 500 were injured. The responsibility is not yet clear; the government on 12 October pointed at the Islamic State but refused the possibility of PKK involvement, likely because the protest was aimed at achieving peace between the PKK and Turkey.

=== 2016 ===
==== Calls for Jihad ====
In the 4th issue of the Islamic State's Rumiyah, the Islamic State referred to Recep Tayyip Erdoğan and Necmettin Erbakan (one of Turkey's most famous Islamists) as ‘tawaghit’ and called their supporters ‘kuffar’ and called for people to ‘ask Allah for help and attack Turkey’ as well as to ‘stab those who support AK Party’.

==== January 8: IS attacks Turkish Bashiqa camp ====
Turkish forces at Iraq's Bashiqa camp killed 17 Islamic State militants when the group attacked the camp with rocket fire and assault rifles. This was the third attack by the Islamic State on the Turkish base. In the camp, Turkey had been training an armed group of Sunni locals to fight the Islamic State.

==== January 12: First 2016 Istanbul bombing and retaliation ====
On January 12, 2016, an Islamic State suicide bomber committed the 2016 Istanbul bombing in Istanbul's historic Sultanahmet Square, killing 12 people. All of the victims killed were foreign citizens (11 Germans, 1 Peruvian). In response to the bombing, the Turkish Army commenced tank and artillery strikes on Islamic State positions in Syria and Iraq. Turkish authorities estimate that these 48 hours of shelling killed nearly 200 Islamic State militants.

==== March 19: Second 2016 Istanbul bombing ====
On March 19, a second Islamic State suicide bombing took place in Istanbul's Beyoğlu district. The attack killed four and wounded 36 people. On March 22, the Turkish interior minister said that the bomber had links with the Islamic State.

==== March 20: Postponement of the Istanbul derby ====
On March 20, the Galatasaray–Fenerbahçe derby game was postponed due to fears of a suspected Islamic State plot to attack the stadium similar to the attack in Paris in November of the previous year.

==== Islamic State fire rockets at Turkish border and Turkey's response ====
On April 22, three people were killed and six others were wounded when Islamic State rocket projectiles hit the border province of Kilis.

On April 24, two rockets fired from Islamic State territory hit Kilis. 16 people were wounded, six of whom were Syrian citizens.

On April 25, the General Staff of the Turkish Armed Forces had announced that eight militants of the Islamic State were killed the same day when Turkish artillery units shelled a missile launcher. Also, the same day the CJTF–OIR hit the Islamic State in northern Syria, located directly across from the southeastern province of Kilis.

On April 26, according to the Turkish army, two missile launchers belonging to the Islamic State were destroyed in an artillery strike which also killed 11 Islamic State militants. This was the second such initiative by the Turkish Army in the past two days.

On April 27, according to Turkish sources, 13 Islamic State militants were killed when Turkish artillery units shelled a building in the Duwaibik region to the north of Aleppo. The building used by Islamic State militants collapsed, killing 13 militants inside and injuring another seven. Around 150 Katyusha rocket projectiles stored on the ground floor of the building were also destroyed. The same day Turkish artillery units also shelled two missile launchers and killed 11 Islamic State militants.

On April 28, five mortar shells targeting a border military post in the Karkamış district of the Gaziantep Province were fired by the Islamic State. 11 Islamic State militants were killed in Turkish artillery shellings following the attack according to Turkish sources.

On April 29, two rocket projectiles fired by the Islamic State hit the border province of Kilis in Turkey.

==== December 23: Execution of two soldiers ====
On December 23, the Islamic State released a video which went viral, showing two captured Turkish soldiers, Fethi Şahin and Sefter Taş, being burned alive. The video caused an uproar in Turkey.

=== 2017 ===
==== January 1: New Year's Eve nightclub attack ====
On January 1, a gunman entered a nightclub in Istanbul and killed 39 people.

==== February: large-scale arrest ====
On 6 February, about 820 Islamic State suspects, most of them foreign nationals in Turkey illegally, were arrested in at least 29 provinces, including capital Ankara and southeastern provinces during the past week, reported by Anadolu Agency.

=== 2019 ===
On November 4, 2019, Turkish communications director Fahrettin Altun stated that Rasmiya Awad, Baghdadi's lesser-known older sister, had been captured. According to Reuters, citing Turkish officials, Awad was captured in a raid on a shipping container in the Turkish-controlled Syrian town of Azaz and that Turkish authorities were interrogating her husband and her daughter-in-law who they also detained. When captured, she was also accompanied by five children. "We hope to gather a trove of intelligence from Baghdadi's sister on the inner workings of ISIS," Altun stated. Little information is available on Baghdadi's sister and Reuters was not immediately able to verify if the captured individual was her.

=== 2021 ===
In 2021, Turkey extended its military presence in various African countries to fight against the Islamic State's Sahil Province, ISWAP, and ISCAP.

=== 2022 ===
Turkey claimed to have arrested Abu al-Hasan al-Hashimi al-Qurashi, who was the third leader of the Islamic State. This turned out to be false

=== 2023 ===
In 2023, Turkey and the United States took joint action to further disrupt financing of the Islamic State.

Turkey claimed in April that Turkish forces had killed Abu al-Hussein al-Husseini al-Qurashi in Syria, however in August, the Islamic State said that Quraishi was killed during clashes against Tahrir al-Sham, whom it accused to be agents of Turkish intelligence. The United States believes the Tahrir al-Sham is behind the killing despite Tahrir al-Sham's denials.

On September 22, Turkish police announced the arrest of 10 people with links to the Islamic State in İzmir after intelligence revealed hidden explosives manufacturing supplies. On December, the Turkish Police arrested at least 304 people suspected of links to the Islamic State during simultaneous raids conducted across the country.

=== 2024 ===
On January 28, 2024, two Islamic State gunmen (a Tajik and a Russian) entered the Church of Santa Maria, a Roman Catholic church located in Sarıyer, Istanbul, and shot at churchgoers, killing 52 year old Tuncer Cihan.

=== 2025 ===
On April 16, 2025, Turkish authorities arrest 89 individuals suspected of being affiliated with the Islamic State during coordinated security operations in 17 provinces, including Istanbul, Antalya, Gaziantep, Hatay and Van.

In September 2025, Turkish police arrest 161 people suspected of being members of the Islamic State (IS) and seize unlicensed weapons and IS documents in raids in 38 provinces, including Istanbul and Ankara.

==== Balçova police station shooting ====
On the morning of September 8, 2025, a mass shooting occurred at the Salih Isgoren police station in the Balçova district of İzmir, Turkey. It left 3 police officers dead, and 4 people injured.

Footage posted by the Gercek Gundem news website showed a video of Bigül in a balaclava, a black top, and pale trousers jogging along the pavement carrying a shotgun while entering the building. The assailant first shot and killed police officer Hasan Akın who was standing guard in front of the station. The second victim was Chief Inspector Muhsin Aydemir who was killed in the ensuing shootout. Three others were injured, including a civilian. One of the injured police officers, Ömer Amilağ succumbed to his wounds in hospital. The attacker, who later died in the hospital, used a Hatsan Escort Xtreme Orange semi-automatic shotgun believed to belong to his father. He was shot in the leg by police and taken into custody.

===== Perpetrator =====
Eren Bigül (2009–2025) was a 16-year-old high school student living in the Balçova district of İzmir, on the same street as the Salih İşgören Police Station where the incident occurred. According to officials, he had no known criminal history. On the day of the attack, he reportedly used a shotgun, believed to belong to his father, to open fire on the police station. He was taken into custody while injured and transported to a hospital, where he later died. An X (formerly Twitter) account allegedly belonging to the attacker contained a post stating "I will perform a suicide attack soon and become a martyr, Allah willing," along with posts related to the Islamic State, according to reports.

==== Christmas and New Year plots ====
In December 2025, Turkish police detained 115 suspected members of the ISIS militant group in coordinated raids across the country over alleged plots linked to Christmas and New Year celebrations. The Istanbul Prosecutor’s Office said in a statement that ISIS was planning to carry out actions targeting the celebrations, especially non-Muslim individuals, within the scope of the upcoming Christmas and New Year.

==== Operation in Yalova ====
On 29 December 2025, at 2 a.m. local time, Turkish police conducted an operation on a rural detached house in the Elmali district of the Yalova Province. During the first hour of the operation, 3 Turkish police officers were seriously injured and later died in the hospital. The operation continued with the arrival of Special Operations Police, and ISIS militants fired back at the police until 9:00 a.m. At this moment, a total of 9 police officers (including a bekçi police) were injured. At 9:40 a.m., a smoke bomb was thrown into the house, and then an intervention was carried out. Six ISIS militants, all of them Turkish citizens, were killed, while five women and six children were safely evacuated from the same house.

=== 2026 ===
On 7 April, 2026, three gunmen affiliated with the Islamic State attacked the Israeli Consulate in Istanbul, Turkey. One attacker was killed while two other gunmen and two police officers sustained injuries. Both Turkey and Israel declared the attack an act of terrorism.

== See also ==
- 2015 counter-terrorism operations in Turkey
- Civil conflict in Turkey
- Terrorism in Turkey
