= Enver Yılmaz =

Turkish politician

İYİ Party Deputy Chairman Head of Political Affairs
- Incumbent
- Assumed office 3 May 2024
- Preceded by: Oktay Vural

Grand National Assembly of Turkey Deputy of the 22nd, 23rd and 24th Terms
- In office 14 November 2002 – 5 April 2014
- Constituency: 2002 - Ordu; 2007 - Ordu; 2011 - Istanbul III

Mayor of Ordu Metropolitan Municipality
- In office 5 April 2014 – 18 September 2018
- Preceded by: Office established
- Succeeded by: Engin Tekintaş

Personal details
- Born: 20 March 1970 (age 56) Ulubey, Ordu, Turkey
- Party: İYİ Party (2024–present)
- Other political affiliations: Justice and Development Party (2001–2018)
- Education: Istanbul University Faculty of Law
- Occupation: Lawyer, politician

Enver Yılmaz (born 20 March 1970, Ulubey, Ordu, Turkey) is a Turkish politician. He served as the Refah Party Ordu Central District Chairman and the Fazilet Party Ordu Provincial Chairman. He is also the founding provincial chairman of the AK Party in Ordu. He entered the parliament as a deputy for Ordu from the AK Party in the 2002 and 2007 elections, and as a deputy for Istanbul in the 2011 elections. In the 2014 Turkish local elections, he was elected as the Mayor of Ordu Metropolitan Municipality. He was the İYİ Party's candidate for Ordu Metropolitan Municipality Mayor in the 2024 Turkish local elections. He has been a deputy chairman of the İYİ Party since 3 May 2024.

== Biography ==
=== Education and career ===
Enver Yılmaz was born on 20 March 1970 in the Aydınlar village of the Ulubey district of Ordu. His father's name is Mehmet, and his mother's name is Hamide. Yılmaz has four brothers and one sister. His father was a farmer, and his mother was a housewife. He started his primary education at Aydınlar Village School. At his family's request, he was enrolled in Hamdullah Suphi Tanrıöver Primary School in the Ordu city center and continued his education there. He completed his secondary education at Ordu High School. He graduated from Istanbul University Faculty of Law. He worked as a judge and later as a self-employed lawyer.

=== Political career ===
In 2001, at the age of 31, he became the founding provincial chairman of the AK Party in Ordu. He served as a deputy for Ordu in the 22nd and 23rd terms and as a deputy for Istanbul in the 24th term. In the 22nd term, he served as a clerk member of the Presidency Council of the Grand National Assembly of Turkey. He was the chairman of the Turkey-Japan Inter-Parliamentary Friendship Group, and a member of the Turkey-Finland Inter-Parliamentary Friendship Group. After the 2007 general elections, he became the deputy chairman of the AK Party's organization and the organization coordinator for the Eastern Anatolia and Southeastern Anatolia regions. He is married and has two children.

In the local elections held on 30 March 2014, he was nominated as the AK Party's candidate for the Ordu Metropolitan Municipality. and became the metropolitan mayor.

On 18 September 2018, he announced his resignation from the Ordu Metropolitan Municipality via Twitter.

In the 2024 Turkish local elections, he was announced as the İYİ Party's candidate for Ordu Metropolitan Municipality Mayor.

Political offices
Preceded by
Seyit Torun
