= Niğde Ömer Halisdemir University =

Public university in Niğde, Turkey

- Motto: Bilimin Aydınlığında Yeni Ufuklara Doğru
- Motto in English: Towards New Horizons With the Illumination of the Science
- Type: Public
- Established: 1992
- Rector: Prof. Dr. Muhsin Kar
- Academic staff: 1,116
- Students: 20,608
- Location: Niğde, Turkey; 37°56′32″N 34°37′25″E
- Website: www.ohu.edu.tr

Niğde Ömer Halisdemir University (Turkish: Niğde Ömer Halisdemir Üniversitesi) (Formerly known as "Nigde University" until 2016) is a public higher educational institution located in Niğde, Central Anatolia in Turkey. It has six faculties, two institutes, two colleges and six vocational colleges. The university campus is situated 6 km (3.7 mi) southwest of Niğde.

The university was renamed in honor of Sgt. Maj. Ömer Halisdemir (1974–2016), a non-commissioned officer, who was killed on duty in the night of 2016 Turkish coup d'état attempt, right after he shot dead a pro-coup general and prevented so the coupists capture the headquarters of the Special Forces Command in Ankara. He is remembered as a major contributor to the failure of the coup attempt. He was a native of Çukurkuyu town in Bor, Niğde.

== Academic units ==
Faculties

- Engineering
- Science and Letters
- Economics and Business Administration
- Education
- Architecture
- Agricultural Sciences and Technologies

Institutes

- Social Sciences
- Sciences

Colleges

- Physical Education and Sports
- Niğde Zübeyde Hanım Health Sciences

Vocational colleges (VC)

- Niğde Social Sciences VC
- Bor VC
- Niğde Zübeyde Hanım Health Services VC
- Ulukışla VC
- Bor Halil Zöhre Ataman VC

== Affiliations ==
The university is a member of the Caucasus University Association.
