= Ömer Halisdemir =

Turkish soldier

- Born: 20 February 1974; Niğde, Turkey
- Died: 16 July 2016 (aged 42); Ankara, Turkey
- Burial place: Çukurkuyu
- Military career
- Allegiance: Turkey
- Branch: Turkish Land Forces
- Service years: 1999–2016
- Rank: Sergeant major
- Unit: Special Forces Command

Ömer Halisdemir was a Turkish non-commissioned officer, who was killed on duty in the night of failed 2016 Turkish coup d'état attempt, immediately after he shot dead pro-coup general Semih Terzi and prevented the capture of the headquarters of the Special Forces Command in Ankara by the rebel forces. His actions are recognized as a major reason for the failure of the coup attempt.

== Early years ==
Ömer Halisdemir was born as one of the seven children to Hasan Hüseyin Halisdemir and his wife Fadimeana at Çukurkuyu town in Bor district of Niğde Province, central Turkey, on 20 February 1974. He spent his childhood in his hometown. During his free time after school hours, he worked as a shepherd.

After completing the primary and middle school, he attended and graduated the Industrial Vocational High School in Niğde. He first entered entrance exam for the Police Academy, which he passed. However, since his dream was always to become a soldier, he did not pursue that path further. A relative took him to Ankara for an exam of non-commissioned officer schools. His childhood dream came true when he passed the exam.

He married Hatice Halisdemir, with whom he had a daughter, Elifnur, and a son, Doğan Ertuğrul.

== Military career ==
In 1999, Ömer Halisdemir joined the Turkish Armed Forces as a non-commissioned officer of the infantry. He served in southeastern Turkey in Şırnak, Silopi and also outside the country in Northern Iraq and Afghanistan. He became a senior sergeant major (Turkish: Astsubay Kıdemli Başçavuş). He was a very successful serviceman fulfilling critical tasks, and was awarded various military decorations. Finally, he served at the Turkish Army's elite Special Forces Command, stationed at the headquarters in Ankara, as the staff sergeant of the commander Major general Zekai Aksakallı (born 1962). He served a long time as an aide for Gen. Aksakallı.

== 2016 coup d'état attempt, killing of Terzi, and death ==
On the night of 15 July, the 2016 Turkish coup d'état attempt, Maj. Gen. Aksakallı heard about the coup attempt as he was not present in the headquarters. His official car was intercepted by three military vehicles on the way to the Presidential Complex. He nevertheless managed to get away from the ambush of the pro-coup troops, which were seeking to capture him. He learned that Brigadier general Semih Terzi, commander of the 1st Special Forces Brigade in Silopi, southeastern Anatolia, was assigned by the coup plotters to take over the Special Forces Command. He quickly ordered his right-hand man, the staff sergeant Halisdemir by phone to take out Terzi in order to prevent this action.

Halisdemir simply affirmed the order, which was a fatal task. Brig. Gen. Terzi and ten heavily armed troops and officers escorting him, who flew in from a military base in Diyarbakır, landed with a helicopter outside the headquarters around 02:16 local time on 16 July. Halisdemir, on duty as commander in charge, came out to greet Terzi (Halisdemir knew Terzi because they worked together for 5 years in Afghanistan). Putschist Terzi told Halisdemir that he was taking over the command of the base. Halisdemir replied he did not receive the order and invited him in. Then he joined the crowd marching towards the entrance of the headquarters building. He drew his handgun and shot the general three times in the head, killing him. Halisdemir then tried to run away. Major Fatih Şahin immediately responded with a barrage of fifteen rounds of gunfire, hitting Halisdemir twelve times in the back. Halisdemir's body was carried out of the way. As Lieutenant Mihrali Atmaca noticed that Halisdemir was still alive, he shot him once more, this time fatally. Putschist Brig. Gen. Terzi was rushed to the military hospital by helicopter. The capture plan turned into a disarray since the chain of command was broken. The whole event was captured on security cameras.

Halisdemir's father later said that "his son served five years with Gen. Terzi in Afghanistan and Terzi thought he could easily take over the headquarters from Halisdemir."

== Aftermath ==
The coup attempt failed nationwide as the rebels were met with a fierce resistance from the public, police and loyalist military. The whole coup attempt was suppressed within the early hours of 16 July. The pro-coup military personnel, who tried to capture the Special Forces Command and killed Sgt. Halisdemir, were arrested. Trial of the seventeen officers began on 20 February 2017. They are each facing a life sentence if found guilty.

Ömer Halisdemir was buried in his hometown, Çukurkuyu, on 17 July 2016. His funeral was attended by high-ranking local officials and thousands of others.

== Legacy ==
A monument to commemorate Halisdemir and his bravery was erected in the front yard of the Special Forces Command headquarters, where he was killed, next to a spot which contains his preserved blood stain.

A public outpouring of sympathy has met Halisdemir, whose grave is visited by a great number of people who come to pay their respects.

A number of schools, parks and public places were named in honor of him. Niğde University, a high school in Etimesgut, Ankara, a middle school in Yunusemre, Manisa, a primary school in Kahramanmaraş, the library of Kütahya Dumlupınar University, a conference hall in Malatya, İmam Hatip high schools in İzmir, Yenimahalle, Ankara and Çekmeköy, Istanbul bear his name.
