= Ordu (electoral district) =

Electoral district for the Grand National Assembly of Turkey

Coordinates: 40°50′N 37°30′E

- electoral district for the Grand National Assembly of Turkey
- Ordu shown within Turkey
- Province: Ordu
- Electorate: 508,530

Current electoral district
- Created: 1920
- Seats: 6 Historical: 5 (2015-2018) 6 (2011-2015) 7 (1999-2011) 8 (1995-1999) 6 (1991-1995) 7 (1987-1991) 6 (1983-1987) 7 (1977-1983) 8 (1961-1977) 10 (1957-1961) 9 (1954-1957)
- MPs: List: Mahmut Özer AKP İbrahim Ufuk Kaynak AKP Mustafa Hamarat AKP Seyit Torun CHP Mustafa Adıgüzel CHP Naci Şanlıtürk MHP
- Turnout at last election: 83.66%
- Representation
- AK Party: 3 / 6
- CHP: 2 / 6
- MHP: 1 / 6

Ordu is an electoral district of the Grand National Assembly of Turkey. It elects six members of parliament (deputies) to represent the province of the same name for a four-year term by the D'Hondt method, a party-list proportional representation system.

The capital of the province is the city of Ordu.

== Members ==
Population reviews of each electoral district are conducted before each general election, which can lead to certain districts being granted a smaller or greater number of parliamentary seats.

Ordu is a borderline electoral district, with its representation varying between six and eight members since the late 1970s. As of the 2011 general election it has elected six members, down from seven seats at the previous election.

Ordu is the seat of the former Interior Minister, İdris Naim Şahin.

MPs for Ordu, 1999 onwards
Seat	1999 (21st parliament)	2002 (22nd parliament)	2007 (23rd parliament)	2011 (24th parliament)	June 2015 (25th parliament)
MP	Hasan Fehmi Konyalı; DSP	Cemal Uysal; AK Party	Mustafa Hamarat; AK Party		Numan Kurtulmuş; AK Party
MP	İhsan Çabuk; DSP	Enver Yılmaz; AK Party		İdris Naim Şahin; AK Party / MİLAD	Oktay Çanak; AK Party
MP	Yener Yıldırım; DYP	Mehmet Hilmi Güler; AK Party		İhsan Şener; AK Party	
MP	Eyüp Fatsa; FP	Eyüp Fatsa; AK Party		Fatih Han Ünal; AK Party	No seat
MP	Sefer Koçak; Anavatan	Hamit Taşçı; AK Party	Ayhan Yılmaz; AK Party	Harun Çakır; AK Party	Seyit Torun; CHP
MP	Şükrü Yürür; Anavatan	İdris Sami Tandoğdu; CHP	Rahmi Güner; CHP	İdris Yıldız; CHP	Mustafa Adıgüzel; CHP
MP	Cemal Enginyurt; MHP	Kazım Türkmen; CHP	Rıdvan Yalçın; MHP	No seat	

== General elections ==
=== 2011 ===
2011 Turkish general election: Ordu
List	Candidates	Votes	Of total (%)	± from prev.
AK Party	İdris Naim Şahin, Mustafa Hamarat, Fatih Han Ünal, İhsan Şener, Harun Çakır	251,319	60.21	
CHP	İdris Yıldız	94,353	22.61	
MHP	None elected	48,647	11.66	
HAS Party	None elected	6208	1.49	N/A
SAADET	None elected	3698	0.89	
Independents	None elected	3281	0.79	
DP	None elected	2543	0.61	
Büyük Birlik	None elected	1760	0.42	
DSP	None elected	1402	0.34	'"`UNIQ−−ref−0000000D−QINU`"'
Labour	None elected	1048	0.25	
HEPAR	None elected	794	0.19	
DYP	None elected	702	0.17	
Nationalist Conservative	None elected	467	0.11	
TKP	None elected	467	0.11	
MP	None elected	410	0.1	
Liberal Democrat	None elected	283	0.07	
Turnout		417,382	83.66	

== Presidential elections ==
=== 2014 ===
Presidential Election 2014: Ordu
Party	Candidate	Votes	%
AK Party	Recep Tayyip Erdoğan	245,857	66.98
Independent	Ekmeleddin İhsanoğlu	69,119	31.61
HDP	Selahattin Demirtaş	5,186	1.41
Total votes		367,076	100.00
Rejected ballots		7,913	2.11
Turnout		374,989	70.21
Recep Tayyip Erdoğan win			
