= Nation and Justice Party =

Nation and Justice Party Millet ve Adalet Partisi
- Abbreviation: MİLAD Partisi
- Leader: Mehmet Bozdemir
- Founded: 19 November 2014
- Dissolved: 14 January 2017
- Split from: Justice and Development Party (AKP)
- Headquarters: Ankara
- Ideology: Civic nationalism Populism
- Political position: Big tent
- Colors: Blue

The Nation and Justice Party (Turkish: Millet ve Adalet Partisi, abbreviated MİLAD) was a political party in Turkey founded by former Interior Minister İdris Naim Şahin on 19 November 2014. The party was the second to break away from the ruling Justice and Development Party (AKP), the first being the Democratic Progress Party (DGP). Şahin resigned from the AKP following the 2013 government corruption scandal, accusing then Prime Minister Recep Tayyip Erdoğan of undermining the rule of law and threatening national unity. He remained the party's only Member of Parliament, representing the Province of Ordu.

The party's establishment has been referred to as a 'new era' for Turkish politics by co-founder Mehmet Bozdemir, who stressed the importance of a sound justice system and national unity. The party's abbreviation, MİLAD, is an Arabic or Persian name usually representing a celebration or birth. The party has criticised the deep political polarisation within the country, blaming it on the government's handling of the corruption investigations. It is unknown whether the party had any links with exiled cleric Fethullah Gülen, who the government accused of orchestrating the corruption investigations to launch a judicial coup against the AKP.

The party's logo has been criticised by the Islamist newspaper MİLAT, who claimed that it resembled their paper's logo and criticised MİLAD Party politicians for defecting from the AKP. DGP founder İdris Bal has accused the party of being established by the AKP to divide the opposition.

It was announced that the MİLAD Party was planning to contest the June 2015 general election under the banner of the Felicity Party. İdris Naim Şahin was to become a parliamentary candidate from İzmir's 1st electoral district. However, the alliance broke off at the last minute, and İdris Naim Şahin did not become a candidate. Since MİLAD Party did not submit a separate candidate list before the deadline (as they planned to join the alliance), they could not participate in the elections.

On 17 April 2015, the party's co-leader and only MP İdris Naim Şahin resigned from the party.

On 14 January 2017, the juridical entity of the party was dissolved.
