= Islamic State – Turkey Province =

Branch of the Islamic State

- الدولة الإسلامية – ولاية تركيا
- The logo of the IS – Turkey
- Other name: Wilayat Turkia
- Dates active: 10 July 2019 – present
- Ideology: Islamic Statism
- Size: Unknown
- Part of: Islamic State
- Wars: Islamic State insurgency in Turkey

The Islamic State – Turkey Province (IS–TP; Arabic: الدولة الإسلامية – ولاية تركيا; Turkish: İslam Devleti – Türkiye Vilayeti) is a former province of the Islamic State (IS), active in Turkey. The group was formed on 10 July 2019. IS-TP is far less active than other established Islamic State provinces, notably the Islamic State – West Africa Province (ISWAP) and Islamic State – Khorasan Province (ISIS–K). In 2026, MEMRI reported that the Islamic State – Turkey Province had been demoted from provincial status.

== History ==
The group was never as active as other Islamic State factions. All previous Islamic State attacks in Turkey were committed by the Dokumacılar, an unofficial cell of the Islamic State – Kurdistan Province.

On April 16, 2025, Turkish authorities arrested 89 individuals suspected of being affiliated with the Islamic State during coordinated security operations in 17 provinces, including Istanbul, Antalya, Gaziantep, Hatay and Van.

On 30 December 2025, in Yalova Province, a police crackdown on an ISIS cell ended up in an ambush by militants. After 9 hours of siege and clashes three police officers and six militants were killed.

In 2026, MEMRI reported that the Islamic State – Turkey Province and the Islamic State – East Asia Province had been demoted from provincial status, with the process taking place between 2024 and 2026. Despite the demotion, the group remained active and continues to claim attacks without referring to itself as a province.
