= Musa Avsever =

Turkish Army general

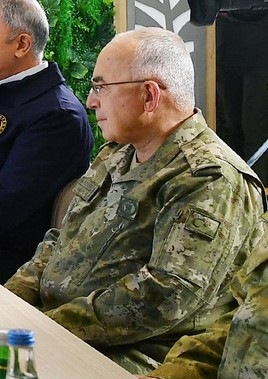
- Born: 7 November 1957 (age 68); Nernek, Halkapınar, Konya, Turkey
- Education: Turkish Military Academy
- Spouse: Mesude Avsever
- Children: 2
- Military career
- Allegiance: Turkey
- Branch: Turkish Land Forces
- Service years: 1978–2023
- Rank: General
- Service number: MU.1978-10
- Commands: Turkish Land Forces; First Army; 2nd Corps; Chief of the Turkish General Staff; Aegean Army; General Staff of the TAF

Musa Avsever (born 7 November 1957) is a retired Turkish general who was the 52nd commander of the Turkish Land Forces. Prior to his appointment as a commander of the Land Forces on 5 August 2021, he served as the 57th commander of the First Army of Turkey from 2016 to 2021. Due to the appointment of General Yaşar Güler as the Minister of National Defense by President Recep Tayyip Erdoğan on June 5, 2023, General Musa Avsever, the Commander of the Army, has been temporarily assigned as the Chief of the General Staff. On August 3, 2023, he was superannuated due to his late age.

== Career ==
Avsever was born in Konya, Turkey. He completed his high school education at Kuleli Military High School. He obtained his graduation from the Turkish Military Academy as a signal officer in 1978. He was enlisted in the Army as a platoon and was appointed at the 7th Corps between 1979 and 1982. Later he was posted at the School and Training Centre of Communications, Electronics and Information System between 1986 and 1988. He graduated with military courses from the Army War College in 1990 and was subsequently appointed as branch commander of the 2nd Infantry Division where he served to the post from 1990 until he was appointed as logistics division officer at the Second Army's headquarter where he served in 1992 unit 1996. After completing his assignments in 1996, he was appointed as cadet battalion commander and chief of Operations and Training branch, Turkish Military Academy from 1996 to 1999.

In the Cyprus Turkish Peace Force Command, he served as chief of Operations and Training branch from 1999 unit he was appointed as commander of the 5th Border Regiment in 2001 to 2003.

Avsever was promoted to the rank of brigadier general in 2003 by the Supreme Military Council and then he was appointed as head of the Land Forces for Supply and Maintenance branch where he served from 2003 to 2005. He also served as a support commander at the General Staff of the Turkish Armed Forces for Communications, Electronics and Information System branch from 2005 to 2007.

In 2007 he was promoted to the rank of major general and was subsequently appointed as the head of Communications, Electronics and Information System branch of the Land Forces where he remained in the office until 2009 when he was appointed as commander of Land Forces School and Training Centre of Communications, Electronics and Information System unit 2011. He also served as a chief of staff in the Aegean Army from 2011 to 2012.

With the promotion of his rank to lieutenant general in 2012 he was appointed head of the Chief of the Turkish General Staff headquarters for Communications, Electronics and Information System from 2012 to 2015. He also served as a commander of the 2nd Corps from 2015 to 2016.

After he completed his assignment at the 2nd Corps, he was promoted to the rank of general and was subsequently appointed as a commander of the First Army from 2016 to 2021.

Military offices
Preceded by Ümit Dündar	Commander of the Turkish Army; 4 August 2021 - 3 August 2023	Succeeded by Selçuk Bayraktaroğlu
Preceded by Ümit Dündar	Commanders of the First Army of Turkey; 28 July 2016 - 4 August 2021	Succeeded by Kemal Yeni
