= 3rd Commando Brigade (Turkey) =

Commando brigade in Turkish Land Forces

- Country: Turkey
- Allegiance: Turkish Army
- Branch: Army
- Type: Infantry
- Size: Brigade
- Part of: 7th Corps
- Garrison/HQ: Siirt
- Motto(s): "Güçlüyüz, Cesuruz, Hazırız." "We are strong, We are brave, We are ready."
- Mascot(s): Scorpion
- Engagements: Operation Olive Branch

Commanders
- Current commander: Brigadier Gen. Ferat Vural

The 3rd Commando Brigade is one of the 12 infantry brigades designated as commando in Turkish Land Forces. It's under the 7th Corps and is headquartered at Siirt. The unit was involved in the Operation Olive Branch (2018) in Syria and is actively involved in the Kurdish–-Turkish conflict. It was professionalized in 2010.

== See also ==
- List of commando units § Turkey
