= Regiment March =

Regiment March (Turkish: Alay Marşı) is the march of Special Forces Command of Turkey. The Soldier's Anthem (Əsgər Marşı) of the Azerbaijani Land Forces was inspired by the march.

== Lyrics ==
Turkish lyrics	English translation
Annem beni yetiştirdi bu ellere yolladı; Al sancağı teslim etti, Allah'a ısmarladı; Boş oturma çalış dedi, hizmet eyle vatana; Sütüm sana helal olmaz, saldırmazsan düşmana; Arş ileri, marş ileri, Türk askeri dönmez geri!; Yastığımız mezar taşı, yorganımız kan olsun; Biz bu yoldan döner isek namus bize ar olsun; Ne şereftir ölmek bize bu güzel vatan için!; Yanar yürek yurt aşkıyla daima için için; Arş ileri, marş ileri, Türk askeri dönmez geri.	My mother raised me and sent me to these lands; She handed over the red flag and entrusted me to God; She said, "Don't sit idly, work and serve the nation; My milk won't be halal for you if you don't attack the enemy"; March forward, march forward, the Turkish soldier never turns back!; May our gravestone be our pillow, may our quilt be our blood; If we turn back from this path, let honor be shame for us; What an honor it is to die for this beautiful homeland!; The heart burns with the love of the homeland, always inwardly; March forward, march forward, the Turkish soldier never turns back!

== See also ==
- Special Forces Command (Turkey)
- Combat Search and Rescue (Turkish Armed Forces)
- March (music)
