= Mustafa Hamarat =

Turkish politician (born 1972)

Mustafa Hamarat MP

Member of the Grand National Assembly
- Incumbent
- Assumed office 2 June 2023
- Constituency: Ordu (2023)
- In office 23 July 2007 – 23 April 2015
- Constituency: Ordu (2007, 2011)

Personal details
- Born: 21 July 1972 (age 54) Akkuş, Ordu
- Party: Justice and Development Party
- Education: University of Ankara
- Profession: Lawyer, Politician

Mustafa Hamarat (born 21 July 1972, in Akkuş, Ordu) is a lawyer and Turkish politician. He is the deputy secretary general of the Justice and Development Party (Turkey) and one of the six Ordu deputies at the 28th Parliament of Turkey.

== Education ==
Mustafa graduated from Ankara University Faculty of Law, completed his master's degree at Kırıkkale University, Institute of Social Sciences, Department of Public Administration.

== Career ==
Mustafa Hamarat started to work as a freelance lawyer in Kırıkkale University and was appointed to the Istanbul Metropolitan Municipality as a corporate lawyer.

In 2002, he was nominated as a parliamentary candidate from the AK Party for Ordu. In 2003, he took office in the Ak Party Istanbul Provincial Administration. He was also the Candidate for mayor of Ümraniye in 2004 local elections. He was elected twice as Ordu's representative from Justice and Development Party in 2007 and 2011 Turkey general elections to become a member of the 23rd and 24th Grand National Assembly of Turkey.

In 2017, Recep Tayyip Erdoğan chose Mustafa Hamarat as the Deputy Secretary General of the Justice and Development Party (AK Party).

In April 2023, He was confirmed as one of AK Party's Ordu candidates for parliament for the 2023 Turkish parliamentary election. He is one of the three AK Party’s candidate that emerged as members of parliament from Ordu. Hamarat was elected to the Grand National Assembly of Turkey for Ordu in the 2023 general election, returning to parliament for the first time since his previous tenure ended in 2015. He began serving as a member of the 28th parliament on 2 June 2023.

During the 28th parliament Hamarat has served on the Constitutional Commission and the Joint Commission of Members of the Constitutional and Justice Commissions. He was also appointed to the Parliamentary Research Commission on Problems in the Fisheries and aquaculture sector. Hamarat has represented Turkey in the Parliamentary Assembly of the Black Sea Economic Cooperation (PABSEC/KEİPA). He was included in the Turkish delegation appointed in July 2025.

In April 2025, he was elected for a two year term as chairman of KEİPA's Committee on Legal Affairs and International Cooperation. In his capacity. He chaired the committee's meetings and worked on issues including international cooperation against organized crime.

In Parliament, Hamarat has spoken on issues concerning his constituency and national policy. In July 2024, he spoke on behalf of the Justice and Development Party (AK party) during a parliamentary debate concerning Hazelnut production and agricultural support for producers in the Black Sea region.

== Personal ==
Mustafa Hamarat speaks English, German and Arabic at an intermediate level, He is married and has 5 children.
