= Semih Terzi =

Turkish general

Semih Terzi (1968 – 16 July 2016) was a general in the Turkish Army, who was shot at the headquarters of the Special Forces Command during the failed 2016 Turkish coup attempt of 15 July. He was taken to the Gülhane Military Medical Academy (GATA) at 06:01, four hours after he was shot and according to witness reports, he was able to sit and talk when he was first brought to the hospital; he was announced dead the next day.

Zekai Aksakallı ordered Ömer Halisdemir, a special forces operative, to neutralize Terzi in the night of the coup which changed the course of the attempt.

== Military career ==
Terzi graduated from the Turkish Army Academy in 1989. In 2009, he was promoted to the rank of a Staff Colonel of the Engineer Corps (Turkish: İstihkam Kurmay Albay). His promotion to the rank of a Brigadier general (Tuğgeneral) by the Supreme Military Council took place in August 2014.

His last duty was commander of the 1st Special Forces Brigade and Special Forces Operations Base stationed in Silopi, Şırnak, southeastern Turkey.

== On the night of the 2016 coup attempt ==
On 15 July 2016, he attempted a coup d'état. Within the frame of the military actions, a group of coup plotters tried to capture the commander of the Special Forces Maj. Gen. Zekai Aksakallı. He learned the coup plotters' intention, and was able to escape his pursuers. As he became aware of the plans of Brig. Gen. Semih Terzi to go to Ankara in order to capture the headquarters of the Special Forces Command in Gölbaşı, he ordered Terzi around 00:30 hours local time by radio not to join the coup plotters. As Terzi showed signs of disobedience, Aksakallı ordered the commander of the 3rd Special Forces commander Brig. Gen. Halil Soysal, who was stationed at Saladin town in northern Iraq, to go to Silopi and to take over command there in order to neutralize the insurgent personnel by eventually interning the duty officer Col. Celal Koca.

In the meantime, Terzi was underway from Diyarbakır Air Base to Akınci Air Base in Ankara in an aircraft. From there, he and twenty officers of diverse ranks flew by helicopter to Gölbaşı. The capture of the headquarters of Special Forces Command was very important for the coup plotters because they would be able to counteract any attempt of the government to prevent the coup by controlling all the special units. After neutralizing the guards at the main entrance, they entered the headquarters front yard around 02:30 hours. Terzi notified the duty officer of the headquarters that he was taking control of the Special Forces. At that moment, Terzi was shot dead by Sgt. Maj. Ömer Halisdemir, who was instructed by Gen. Maj. Zekai Aksakallı and was loyal to him. The putschist soldiers accompanying Terzi immediately killed Halisdemir in response. Terzi's body was wrapped in a cloth, and was rushed by helicopter to GATA Gülhane Military Medical Academy Hospital, where he was pronounced dead. Halisdemir's body remained in the front yard of the headquarters. The death of Terzi prevented a change in the chain of command.

== Burial ==
The body of Terzi was transferred to Erzincan for burial. However, the Erzincan Municipality, responsible for burial service, called him a "traitor", and rejected his burial in the city cemetery. His family, therefore, buried him in the back yard of their home.

== Family ==
He was survived by his wife Nazire Terzi. The widow was accused of "aiding the crime of violation of the constitution", and was sentenced to 18 years in prison in February 2018 after having been detained 559 days in jail.
