= Seyit Torun =

Turkish politician (born 1968)

Seyit Torun MP
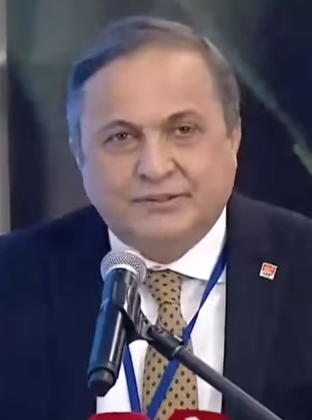

Member of the Grand National Assembly
- Incumbent
- Assumed office 23 June 2015
- Constituency: Ordu (June 2015, Nov 2015, 2018, 2023)

Personal details
- Born: February 1, 1968 (age 58) Ordu, Turkey
- Party: Republican People's Party (CHP)
- Education: Atatürk University

Seyit Torun (born 1 February 1968) is a Turkish economist and politician from Republican People's Party (CHP), who has served as a Member of Parliament for Ordu since 23 June 2015.

== Early life and career ==
Seyit Torun was born in Ordu on 1 February 1968 to Hikmet Torun and his wife Sahinur. Torun completed his high school education in Ordu. He graduated from Atatürk University in 1990.

== Political career ==
=== Member of Parliament ===
Torun was elected as a CHP Member of Parliament for Ordu in the June 2015 general election. He was re-elected in November 2015.
