= Salih Zeki Çolak =

Turkish general

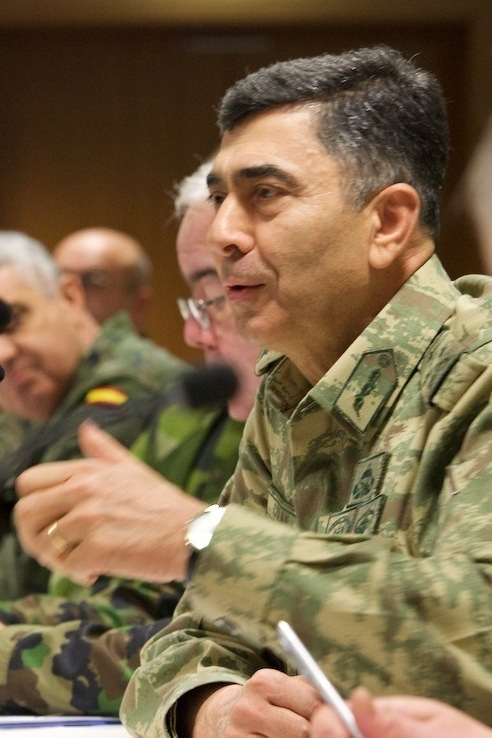
- Born: 20 July 1954 (age 72); Trabzon, Turkey
- Education: Army War College
- Spouse: Melek Çolak
- Children: 2
- Military career
- Allegiance: Turkey
- Branch: Land Forces
- Service years: 1974–2017
- Rank: General
- Commands: Commander of the Turkish Land Forces; First Army; 7th Corps
- Awards: Medal "For services in the field of military cooperation" Nishan-e-Imtiaz

Salih Zeki Çolak (born 20 July 1954) is a Turkish retired Army general who served as the 49th commander of the Turkish Land Forces from 17 August 2015 to 23 August 2017 and commander of the First Army by the Supreme Military Council in 2014, and chief of staff of the Land Forces.

== Biography ==
Çolak was born in Akçaabat, Trabzon, Turkey. He obtained his graduation from the Turkish Military Academy with ensign rank in 1974 and from the Artillery and Missile School with lieutenant rank in 1975. Before becoming a staff officer and obtaining graduation from the Army War College in 1988, he served at various military positions such as platoon commander and artillery battery officer.

After 1988 he was appointed to the Operations and Training Branch Directorate Command, battalion commander in the 49th Infantry Regiment, program officer in the General Staff Financial Planning Program Department, and military representation and the chief of staff in the Western European Union, Brussels. He also served as head in the 108th Artillery Regiment Command for the Press, Public Relations and Publicity department and general secretary of the General Staff.

After Çolak was promoted to the rank of brigadier general in 2001, he served at the Appointment department and 19th Infantry Brigade Command of the Land Forces. With his promotion to the rank of major general in 2005, he was appointed as the head of Personnel department, the General Secretary of the General Staff

and was promoted to the rank of Major General in 2005. In this rank, he served as the head of various branches of the Land Forces such as Personnel, the General Staff, the Armored Units School and the Training Division.

He was promoted to the rank of lieutenant general in 2009 and was subsequently appointed as commander of the 7th Corps and chief of staff in 2011. Following by his promotion to the rank of four-star general in 2013, he was transferred to the Training and Doctrine Command of the Land Forces.

Çolak was held hostage at the Mürted Airfield Command during the 2016 Turkish coup d'état attempt by participants of the Peace at Home Council.

Military offices
Preceded by Hulusi Akar	Commander of the Turkish Army; 15 August 2011 - 3 August 2013	Succeeded by Yaşar Güler
Preceded by Ahmet Turmuş	Commanders of the First Army of Turkey; 5 August 2014 - 10 August 2015	Succeeded by Ümit Dündar
