= Metin Gürak =

Turkish general and politician

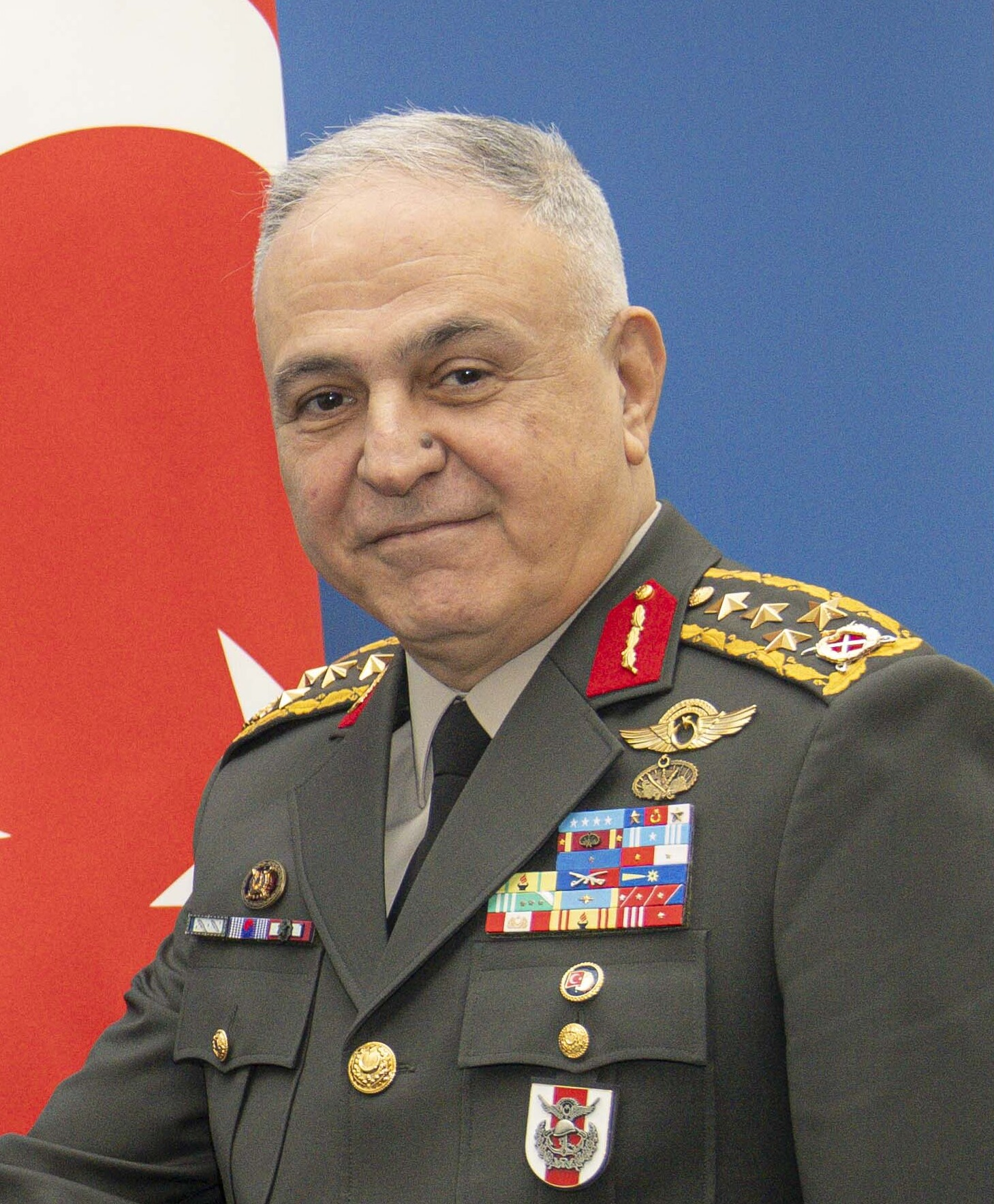

31st Chief of the Turkish General Staff
- In office 16 August 2023 – August 2025
- President: Recep Tayyip Erdoğan
- Preceded by: Yaşar Güler
- Succeeded by: Selçuk Bayraktaroğlu

48th Commander of the Second Army
- In office 30 August 2020 – 16 August 2023
- Preceded by: Sinan Yayla
- Succeeded by: Metin Tokel

Deputy Chief of the Turkish General Staff
- In office 16 July 2018 – 9 January 2020
- Preceded by: Ümit Dündar
- Succeeded by: Selçuk Bayraktaroğlu

Chief of Staff of the Turkish Land Forces
- In office 19 August 2017 – 16 July 2018
- Preceded by: Şeref Öngay
- Succeeded by: Yavuz Türkgenci

Personal details
- Born: 20 August 1960 (age 66) Kızıltepe, Mardin, Turkey
- Spouse(s): Zerrin Gürak (died 2020)
- Children: 2
- Education: Turkish Military Academy
- Awards: TAF Medal of Honor; TAF Medal of Distinguished Courage and Self-Sacrifice; TAF Medal of Distinguished Service; Nishan-e-Imtiaz

Military service
- Allegiance: Turkey
- Branch/service: Turkish Land Forces
- Years of service: 1981–present
- Rank: General
- Commands: General Staff of the Republic of Turkey

General Metin Gürak (born 20 August 1960) is a Turkish general who served as the 31st chief of the Turkish General Staff from August 2023 to August 2025. He also served as commander of the Second Army.

== Early life and education ==
Gürak was born on 20 August 1960 at Kızıltepe, Mardin. He graduated the Turkish Military Academy in 1981 and was commissioned as a second lieutenant upon graduation. Gürak also entered the Artillery and Missile School (Turkish: Topçu ve Füze Okulu) in 1982, the School of Army Aviation in 1985, where he became a certified army aviator, and completed the Staff Officer Course at the Land War Institute of the National Defense University in 1990.

== Military career ==
Gürak served under the 2nd Armored Brigade of the 3rd Corps of the 1st Army and the 20th Mechanized Brigade of the 7th Corps between 1990 and 1993, before serving as the deputy military attaché in Egypt from 1993 to 1995. He later served as staff officer and counter terrorism battalion commander under the 9th Corps from 1995 to 1998, before being named as the branch head under the Turkish Land Forces Headquarters from 1998 to 2002, and later served as the chief of cabinet at the Ministry of National Defense Headquarters between 2002 and 2004.

Gürak later served under the 49th Internal Security Brigade as deputy commander in 2004 to 2005, before serving subsequently as the deputy commander of the 49th Internal Security Brigade and as Muş Garrison Commander at Muş Province from 2004 to 2005. He later served as secretary general of 1st Army between 2005 and 2006. In 2006, Gürak was promoted to the rank of brigadier general as the commander of the 2nd Armored Brigade of the 3rd Corps in 2006 to 2008 Chief of Communication Department under the General Staff of the Turkish Armed Forces from 2008 to 2010.

In 2010, Gürak was promoted to the rank of major general and was named as the dean of the Turkish Military Academy from 2010 to 2013, and was named as commander of the Army Aviation School in 2013 to 2014, and was later named as commander of the Turkish Army Aviation Command from 2014 to 2015. He was promoted to the rank of lieutenant general in 2015, and was named as commander of the 4th Corps in 2015 to 2016, before being appointed as the commander of the Training and Doctrine Command from 2016 to 2017, and later served as Chief of Staff of Land Forces from 2017 to 2018. He later served as the deputy chief of the General Staff from 16 July 2018 t0 9 January 2020.

Gürak was promoted to the rank of general on 30 August 2020 as he named as the Commander of the 2nd Army, and held this position until 16 August 2023, as he was appointed as the 31st Chief of the Turkish General Staff, replacing Yaşar Güler, who was named Minister of National Defense.

Military offices
Preceded by Yaşar Güler	Chief of the Turkish General Staff; 16 August 2023 – August 2025	Succeeded by Selçuk Bayraktaroğlu
