= Hüseyin Çapkın =

Personal details
- Born: 1951 (age 74–75) Akyurt, Tire, İzmir Province, Turkey
- Education: Turkish National Police Academy
- Occupation: Police chief
- Website: www.iem.gov.tr

Hüseyin Çapkın (born 1951) is a Turkish civil servant. He was lately the police chief of Istanbul Province.

== Early life ==
He was born 1951 at Akyurt village of Tire district in İzmir Province to a farmer's family. After completing his primary and secondary education in his village, he enrolled in the Police College in 1965. He then studied at the Police Academy graduating in the rank of a police sergeant in 1971.

Çapkın holds a master's degree from the Institute of Turkish Middle East Public Service (TODAİE) on juvenile delinquency, and another master's degree from the Academy of Economy and Commerce in Ankara on public management. He has a diploma in English language.

== Career ==
Right after his graduation, Çapkın was assigned to the Police Directoriate in Balıkesir in 1971. In the following years, he served in different positions at the Police Directoriate in Ankara Province between 1975 and 1984.

In 1984, Çapkın was appointed police chief of Yozgat Province, and then served in Mersin Province between 1985 and 1988. He was promoted to the post of deputy police general manager in 1988, at which he served until 1991. The next year, Çapkın was appointed police chief in Antalya Province. Between 1992 and 1993, he worked as a specialist for research, planning and coordination. In later years, he served as police chief in the provinces Gaziantep (1993–1998), Manisa (1998–2001), Adana (2002–2003) and Bursa /2003-2006).

Hüseyin Çapkın was appointed police chief of his hometown İzmir Province in 2006. On June 29, 2009, he became police chief of Istanbul Province. On May 13, 2010, Çapkın was appointed province governor of Iğdır.

After a brief time at this post, he returned to his former post as the police chief of Istanbul Province on May 29 that year. Çapkın got much appreciated as he was successful in catching the long wanted murderer of a decapitated girl shortly after his appointment in Istanbul. He was dismissed from his post of Istanbul Police Chief on December 19, 2013, amid bribery probe into high-profile figures launched two days before. The day before, two of his assistants and four assistant chiefs were also taken off their posts.

On August 30, 2016, Çapkın was detained at his home in Çeşme, İzmir Province and transferred to Istanbul. He is accused of being a member of a terror organization allegedly led by Fetullah Gülen. The accusation is in line with the testimony of the former Governor of İstanbul Hüseyin Avni Mutlu, who was arrested shortly before.

== Family life ==
Hüseyin Çapkın married in 1971 with Nurten Çapkın. The couple has two daughters.
