= Selami Altınok =

Turkish civil servant

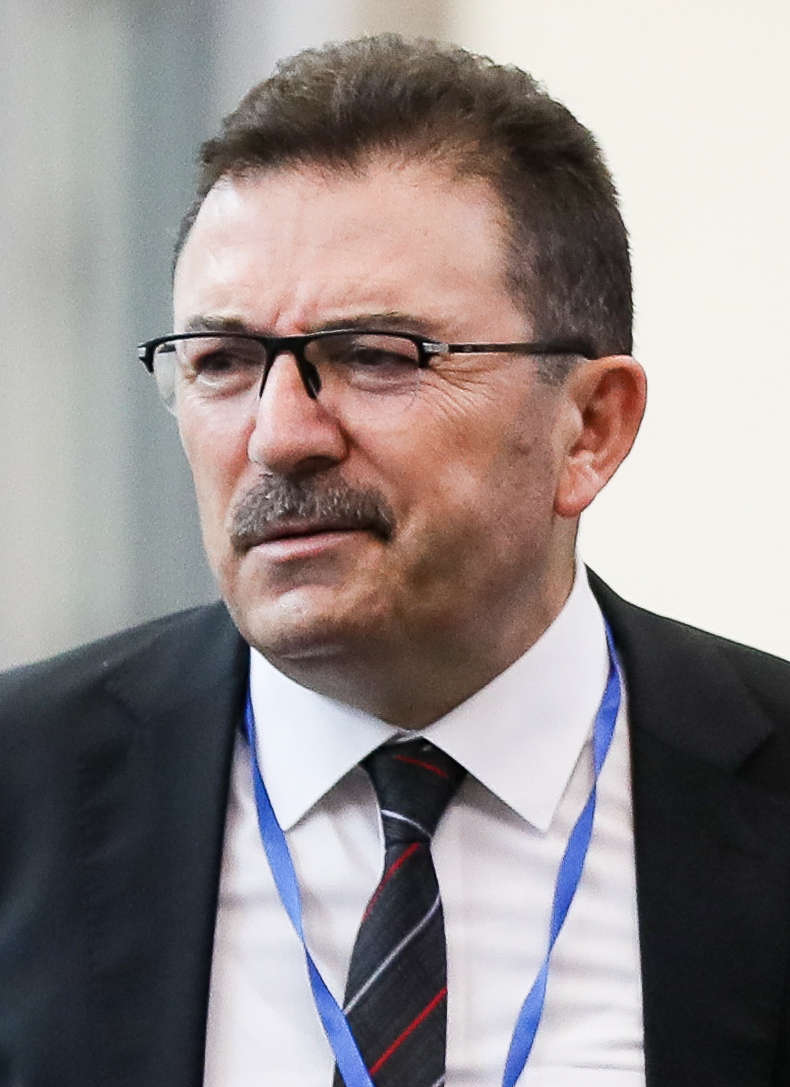

Minister of the Interior
- In office 28 August 2015 – 17 November 2015
- Prime Minister: Ahmet Davutoğlu
- Preceded by: Sebahattin Öztürk
- Succeeded by: Efkan Ala

Istanbul General Director of Security
- In office 18 December 2013 – 31 August 2015
- Preceded by: Hüseyin Çapkın
- Succeeded by: Mustafa Çalışkan

10th Governor of Aksaray
- In office 2 August 2012 – 16 February 2014
- President: Abdullah Gül
- Preceded by: Orhan Alimoğlu
- Succeeded by: Şeref Ataklı

Personal details
- Born: January 20, 1966 (age 60) Narman, Erzurum, Turkey
- Education: Istanbul University
- Occupation: Civil servant
- Cabinet: 63rd

Selami Altınok (born 20 January 1966) is a Turkish civil servant and politician who served as the Minister of the Interior in the interim election government formed by Prime Minister Ahmet Davutoğlu between 28 August and 17 November 2015. He previously served as the 10th Governor of Aksaray from 2012 to 2014 and was appointed as the General Director of Security in Istanbul on 16 December 2013. He is also a former Kaymakam (sub-governor).

A member of the Justice and Development Party, he was elected to the Grand National Assembly of Turkey in the 2023 parliamentary election from Erzurum.

== Early life and career ==
Selami Altınok was born in 1966 in Narman, Erzurum and graduated from Department of Public Administration in Istanbul University Faculty of Political Sciences in 1988. He was later appointed as the Deputy Kaymakam to the district of Akkışla and went on to become the Kaymakam of Almus, Güroymak, Erciş, Terme and Serik. After serving as a Kaymakam, he became the General Secretary of the Erzurum Special Provincial Administration.

=== Governor of Aksaray ===
Altınok was appointed as the 10th Governor of Aksaray by the Ministry of the Interior, with his appointment being validated by the Turkish government and the President Abdullah Gül on 2 August 2012. He served in this position until 16 February 2014, after which he was appointed as a Central Governor with no responsibility.

=== Istanbul General Director of Security ===
Following a series of police raids on the homes of numerous businessmen and the sons of four cabinet ministers as part of a government corruption scandal, the serving Istanbul General Director of Security who had ordered the operations, Hüseyin Çapkın, was removed from his post. In his government's defence, Prime Minister Recep Tayyip Erdoğan had accused the perpetrators of the anti-corruption operation to be sympathisers of the Gülen Movement and would be removed from their positions. After the controversial removal of Çapkın from office, Altınok was appointed as the new General Director of Security for Istanbul.

== Tape recording scandal ==
While serving as the Istanbul General Director of Security, a recording of a phone call between Altınok and the then-Undersecretary to the Interior Ministry (later Interior Minister) Efkan Ala was leaked on the Internet, allegedly by the Gülen Movement. In the alleged phone call, Altınok could be heard saying that 'they would violently crush the heads of any dissident'. The released recordings, which targeted numerous government ministers and supporters, were dismissed as fakes by the then-Prime Minister Recep Tayyip Erdoğan.

== Minister of the Interior ==
After the June 2015 general election resulted in a hung parliament, unsuccessful coalition negotiations raised speculation over whether President Recep Tayyip Erdoğan would call an early election in the event that AKP leader Ahmet Davutoğlu was unable to form a government within the given constitutional time of 45 days. As required by the 114th article of the Constitution of Turkey, the calling of a snap general election by the President necessitates the forming of an interim election government, in which all parties represented in Parliament are given a certain number of ministers according to how many MPs they have. If a party refused to send ministers to the interim cabinet, then independents must take their place.

When going into an election, the Constitution requires that the partisan ministers responsible for the Interior, for Justice and for Transport to resign from their positions and to be replaced by independent civil servants three months before polling day. As a result, the Interior Ministry was already administered by the independent former Undersecretary, Sebahattin Öztürk, since 7 March 2015. When the interim cabinet was announced, Altınok was announced as the new independent Minister of the Interior on 28 August 2015. He is known for being close to the former AKP Interior Minister Efkan Âlâ, who resigned as required by the Constitution on 7 March 2015.

== See also ==
- List of Turkish civil servants
