= İdris Naim Şahin =

Turkish politician (born 1956)

İdris Naim Şahin MP
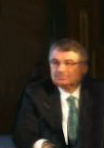

Leader of the Nation and Justice Party
- Incumbent
- Assumed office 19 November 2014 Serving with Mehmet Bozdemir
- Preceded by: Position established

Minister of Interior
- In office 6 July 2011 – 24 January 2013
- Prime Minister: Recep Tayyip Erdoğan
- Preceded by: Osman Güneş
- Succeeded by: Muammer Güler

Member of the Grand National Assembly
- Incumbent
- Assumed office 9 November 2002
- Constituency: İstanbul (III) (2002, 2007); Ordu (2011)

Personal details
- Born: 1 June 1956 (age 70) Ünye, Ordu, Turkey
- Party: Justice and Development Party (AK PARTİ) 2002-2013; Nation and Justice Party 2014-2015
- Education: Istanbul University
- Occupation: Politician

İdris Naim Şahin (born 1 June 1956, Ünye, Ordu, Turkey) is a Turkish politician who was elected to the Turkish Grand National Assembly in 2002, representing Istanbul.

He was appointed to the Ministry of Internal Affairs on 6 July 2011 by Prime Minister Recep Tayyip Erdogan in his new cabinet. On 24 January 2013, he was replaced by Muammer Güler at his post.

Şahin resigned from the ruling Justice and Development Party on 25 December 2013 amidst the corruption scandal involving several ministers.

Political offices
Preceded by Osman Güneş	Minister of the Interior; 6 July 2011 – 24 January 2013	Succeeded by Muammer Güler
