= Democratic Progress Party =

Democratic Progress Party Demokratik Gelişim Partisi
- Abbreviation: DGP
- Founder: İdris Bal
- Founded: November 4, 2014
- Dissolved: March 31, 2015
- Split from: Justice and Development Party (AKP)
- Headquarters: Ankara
- Ideology: Liberal conservatism
- Political position: Right-wing
- Colours: Red

The Democratic Progress Party (Turkish: Demokratik Gelişim Partisi, abbreviated DGP) was a political party in Turkey which adhered to liberal conservatism. It was founded by Kütahya Member of Parliament İdris Bal on 4 November 2014. Bal had left the governing Justice and Development Party (AKP) in November 2013 after Prime Minister Recep Tayyip Erdoğan fell out with Gülen following the 2013-14 anti-government protests.

Bal highlighted that the party would tackle the democratic deficit within Turkish politics, claiming that the lack of democracy and the politicisation of the judiciary by the AKP were the two largest problems facing the country. Although he said that he hadn't met Gülen before forming the party, he said that he would be open to his, as well as everyone else's involvement in the party. Amongst possibilities that other MPs who had resigned from the AKP might join the DGP, Bal remains the party's only sitting MP. 12 hours after the party's formation, co-founder Fevzi Bubilik resigned and criticised the party for not being democratic enough.

On 31 March 2015, DGP's leader and only MP İdris Bal resigned and left the party. He accused the media, in particular media linked with Gülen movement, of subjecting his party to censorship.
