= Ümit Dündar =

Turkish general

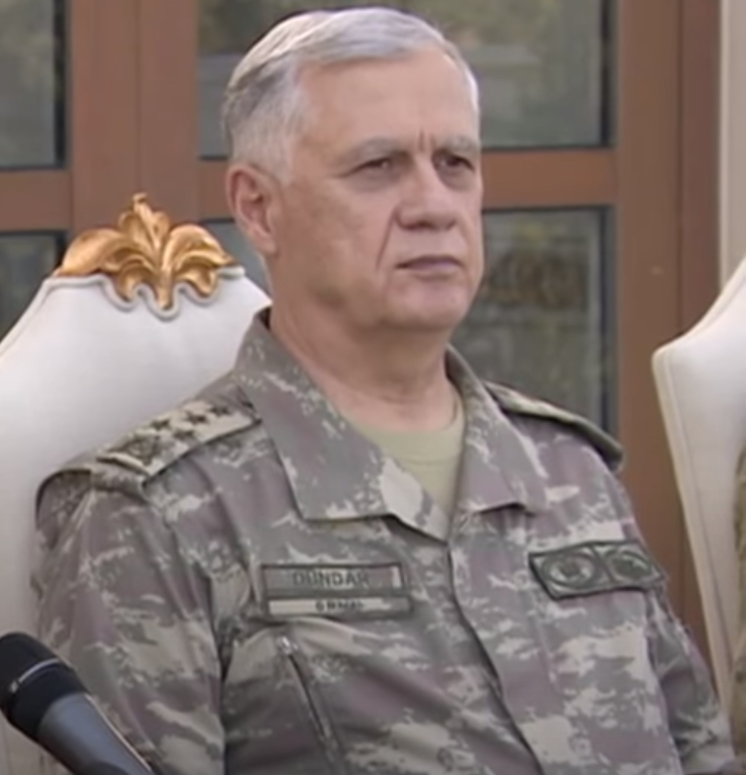
- Dündar in 2020
- Born: 2 October 1955 (age 71); Manisa, Turkey
- Education: Turkish Military Academy
- Military career
- Allegiance: Turkey
- Branch: Turkish Land Forces
- Service years: 1975–2021
- Rank: General
- Awards: TAF Medal of Honor; TAF Medal of Distinguished Courage and Self-Sacrifice; TAF Medal of Distinguished Service

Ümit Dündar (born 2 October 1955) is a Turkish general who was temporarily Chief of the General Staff of the Turkish Armed Forces while Hulusi Akar was being held hostage by coup forces during the 2016 Turkish coup d'état attempt.

== Career ==
He graduated from Kuleli Military High School in 1972, from the Turkish Military Academy in 1975, and from the Command of the Engineering School and Training Center in 1976. He graduated from the Army War College in 1985 and became a staff officer. After becoming an Operations Branch of the 3rd Army Command Operations Directorate and the Commander of the 5th Border Regiment.

He was promoted to the rank of brigadier general in 2001. In this rank, he worked as the Head of Ministry of National Defense Construction Real Estate Department, National Defense Construction Real Estate and NATO Infrastructure Department and 28th Peace Force Brigade Commander.

He was promoted to the rank of major general in 2005. In this rank, he served as Chief of General Staff Engineering Department, Engineering School and Training Center, respectively, and in 2009 he was promoted to the rank of lieutenant general and was appointed to the Commander of the 5th Corps. He was appointed to the Undersecretariat of the Ministry of National Defense in 2011.

He was promoted to the rank of general in 2013 and was appointed Commander of the 3rd Army. He was appointed to the First Army Commander in 2015.

After the 2016 military coup attempt, he was appointed as the acting Chief of the Turkish General Staff and took on this post for a while. On July 16, the night of the coup, he was connected to various television channels between 00:50 and 1:00 and stated that the coup attempt was not supported by the Turkish Armed Forces, and that this coup attempt was carried out by certain groups in the army. The governor of Istanbul stated that they were fighting against the coup with the police units and the First Army he commanded. Following the coup he was promoted to the Deputy Chief of General Staff.

On July 9, 2018, he was appointed as the Land Forces Commander with the decree approved by President Recep Tayyip Erdoğan.

Military offices
Preceded by Yaşar Güler	Commander of the Turkish Army; 10 July 2018 - 19 August 2021	Succeeded by Musa Avsever
Preceded by Yaşar Güler	TAF General Staff II. List of presidents 28 July 2016 - 23 July 2018	Succeeded by Metin Gürak
Preceded by Salih Zeki Çolak	Commanders of the First Army of Turkey; 10 August 2015 - 28 July 2016	Succeeded by Musa Avsever
Preceded by Ahmet Turmuş	Commanders of the Third Army of Turkey; 25 August 2013 - 8 August 2015	Succeeded by İsmail Serdar Savaş
