= Ömer Ertuğrul Erbakan =

Turkish general

- Born: 27 December 1965 (age 60); Kaplıkaya, Elazığ, Turkey
- Military career
- Allegiance: Turkey
- Branch: Special Forces
- Service years: 1984–present
- Rank: Major general
- Commands: Special Forces
- Conflicts: Turkish involvement in the Syrian Civil War: Operation Euphrates Shield; 2016 Dabiq offensive; Battle of al-Bab; Operation Peace Spring

Ömer Ertuğrul Erbakan (born 27 December 1965) is a Turkish general. He is the current commander of the Turkish Special Forces.

== Biography ==
He graduated from the Turkish Military Academy.

Erbakan, who started his military career as a commando, completed his military specialization courses. He previously served in the special forces. In 2017, after Sivas 5th Infantry Training Brigade Commander Colonel Mehmet Kip was promoted to brigadier general and appointed to Ankara Central Command, he was appointed to the 5th Infantry Training Brigade Command. In 2019, he was promoted from brigadier general to major general following the Supreme Military Council. With the decision taken at the same council, he was appointed the Special Forces Command from the 5th Infantry Training Brigade Command in Sivas.
