= Special Forces Command (Turkey) =

Turkish special forces group

- Turkish: Özel Kuvvetler Komutanlığı
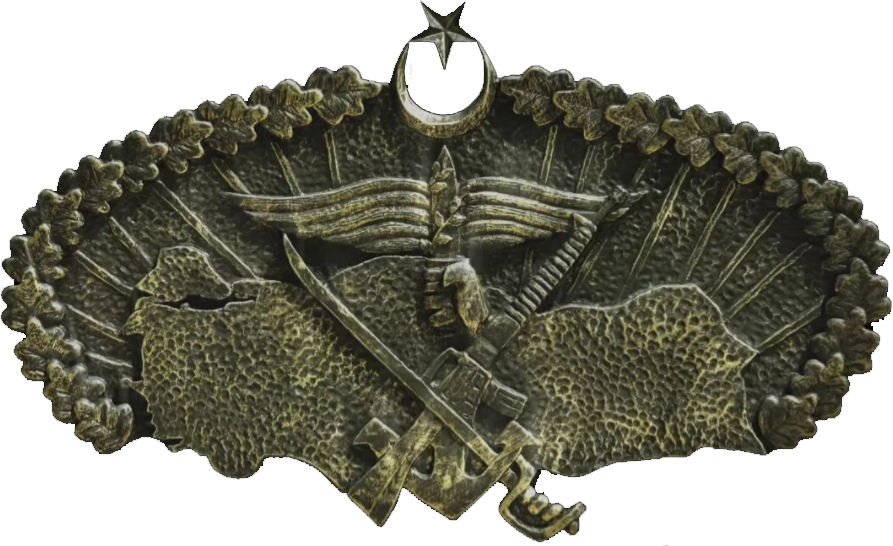
- Badge of the Special Forces Command
- Active: 1952–present
- Country: Turkey
- Branch: General Staff
- Type: Special forces
- Role: Unconventional warfare
- Garrison/HQ: Ankara
- Nickname: Maroon Berets (Turkish: Bordo Bereliler)
- Motto: "The difficult we do immediately. The impossible takes a little longer."
- Beret: Maroon (claret red)
- March: Alay Marşı (Regiment March)
- Engagements: Kurdish–Turkish conflict (1978–present): October 1992 Turkish incursion into northern Iraq; Turkish army winter campaign of 1994–1995; Operation Steel (1995); Operation Hammer (1997); Operation Dawn (1997); Operation Sun (2008); Turkey–Islamic State conflict; Operation Martyr Yalçın (2015); PKK–Turkish conflict; Operation Euphrates Shield; Operation Olive Branch; Operation Spring Shield; Second Libyan Civil War (2020); Operation Claw-Lock

Commanders
- Current commander: Major General Ömer Ertuğrul Erbakan
- Notable commanders: Engin Alan; Zekai Aksakallı

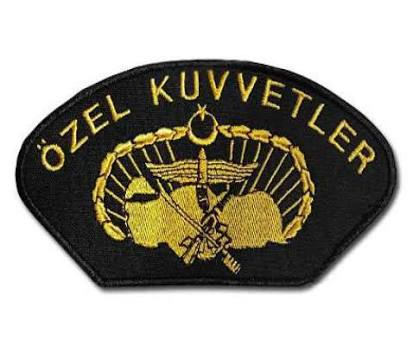
Patch

The Special Forces Command (Turkish: Özel Kuvvetler Komutanlığı—ÖKK) is a corps of the Turkish Armed Forces, initially established as a brigade in 14 April 1992, operating directly under the Turkish General Staff. According to the Turkish Armed Forces (TAF) dress code, the ÖKK, also known as the Bordo Bereliler, are noteworthy for their distinctive maroon berets. Their task is to carry out special operations that exceed the capabilities of other military units.

== History ==
First established on 27 September 1952 as the Special and Auxiliary Combat Units (Hususi ve Yardımcı Muharip Birlikleri), as a part of NATO's Operation Gladio, they did counterguerilla operations in North Korean territory during the Korean War. In November 1953, re-established as the Mobilized Reconnaissance Board and were sent out to Cyprus for Long-range reconnaissance operations and arming and organizing the Turkish Resistance Organization. On 14 December 1970, it was reorganized as the Special Warfare Department. Due to the emergence of external dangers after the Gulf War and threats from the northern part of Iraq, the Special Forces Command was established as a brigade on 14 April 1992. In 2006, the brigade transitioned to a division. ÖKK leadership was upgraded from major-general to lieutenant-general and the new division was split into the 1st and 2nd brigade with the expectation that the troop count would double from 7000 to 14,000 by 2009. They ranked first among twenty-six special forces troops at the World Special Forces Championship held in Germany in 2004.

In 1998, Turkey's special forces intercepted a warning intended for the PKK team in Iraq, infiltrated PKK operations and captured the commander of Kurdistan Democratic Party's (PKK) military forces, Şemdin Sakık. In 1999, the Turkish Special Forces used technology given to them by the Netherlands to arrest Abdullah Öcalan, a founding member of the PKK, after he landed at the Nairobi airport in Kenya. In 2014, after 49 consular employees were taken hostage by ISIS in Mosul, Special Forces Command carried out joint operations with MIT, the Turkish National Intelligence Organization, and rescued the hostages. Special Forces Command took part in internal security operations during the 2015-2016 curfews in the Southeastern Anatolia Region, Furthermore, on 21 February 2015 they participated in Operation Shah Euphrates to relocate the tomb of Suleyman Shah in Syria. With the start of the operations in Syria against ISIS and PYD in 2016 during Operation Euphrates Shield, the Special Forces Command infiltrated the region and carried out exploration activities supported by the Free Syrian Army. Special Forces Command also played a role in operations such as Operation Olive Branch, Operation Claw (2019–2020), Operation Peace Spring and Operations Claw-Eagle and Tiger.

Turkish SF Officers are constantly operating and are active in the war on the PKK in the southeastern border region of Turkey and northern Iraq.

=== Attempted coup d'état ===
A key figure of the 2016 Turkish coup d'état attempt was brigadier general Semih Terzi, who was Deputy Commander of the Special Forces at the time and the highest-ranking field commander during the coup attempt. He led a team of roughly 40 special forces operatives in an attempt to secure Special Forces Headquarters and organize attacks against government agencies and the parliament. The attempt ended in failure when ÖKK Senior Sergeant major Ömer Halisdemir shot and killed Terzi, disrupting the command of the rebels.

== Organization ==
The Special Forces are not aligned to any of the three branches of the TAF. They receive orders directly from the General Staff of the Republic of Turkey.

- 1st Special Forces Brigade
- 2nd Special Forces Brigade
- 3rd Special Forces Brigade
- 4th Special Forces Brigade
- 5th Special Forces Brigade
- Special Aviation Group
- Combat Search and Rescue
- Natural Disaster Search and Rescue
- School Command
- Support Troops Command
- Mobilization Inspection Board
- Special Protection Unit

=== Special Aviation Group ===
Special Aviation Group provides helicopter support for the Command's missions. The helicopters were modernized in 2015 and can operate at night or during the day.

== Training and recruitment ==
ÖKK recruits officers, NCOs and SNCOs almost exclusively from the Land Forces Command, Turkey's army branch. Volunteers must pass written and physical exams, and linguistic skills in at least one foreign language are beneficial toward admission.

The ÖKK training period lasts around 3.5-5 years, and encompasses: unconventional warfare and various special warfare types, special operations, special reconnaissance and infiltration, covert operations, psychological warfare, underwater operation, static parachute and HALO (night and day jump), counter-terrorism in residential areas, close-quarters combat, resisting torture and interrogation techniques, ambush, raid, sabotage, escape, VIP protection, marksmanship, intelligence, languages, survival, operation in deep snow, extreme weather, bomb disposal, demolition, fire arrangement, damage detection, and TCCC.

Recruits must undergo:

- Domestic training (72 weeks)
- International training (10 to 52 weeks, depending on rank)
- Specialty training

After graduating from Special Operations Training, commandos are tested before they officially become Maroon Beret officers. They are expected to survive in all environmental conditions, so as part of the final testing stage teams of recruits are left in different environments for two weeks, with no equipment or help.

On the last month of training, called the "hell month", Maroon Berets receive training in interrogation and torture, and undertake a Trust Shot (Turkish: Güven Atışı) exercise. In this exercise, two members of a squad have to flank paper target boards while the third advances from 15 m (49 ft) and shoots at the targets with live ammunition. Those flanking the targets are not permitted to move or wear body armor.

== Equipment ==
Maroon Berets
Pistols	HK USP, SIG P226, SIG P229, Sarsilmaz Kilinc 2000 Mega, Sarsilmaz Kilinc 2000 Light, Glock 17, Glock 19
Shotguns	Benelli M4 Super 90
Assault rifles	CAR-15, Heckler & Koch HK416, M4A1, IWI Tavor TAR-21, MAR 556
Submachine guns	HK MP5, MP7A1, FN P90
Sniper rifles	KNT-308, Sako TRG, CheyTac Intervention, Barrett M82, Accuracy International Arctic Warfare, MKEK JNG-90, M110, McMillan Tac-50, Remington MSR & Accuracy International AX50, KNT-76

== See also ==
- List of military special forces units
