= İdris Bal =

Turkish politician

Leader of the Democratic Progress Party
- In office 4 November 2014 – 31 March 2015
- Preceded by: Position established
- Succeeded by: Position abolished

Member of the Grand National Assembly
- In office 12 June 2011 – 7 June 2015
- Constituency: Kütahya (2011)

Personal details
- Born: 25 April 1968 (age 58) Altıntaş, Kütahya Province, Turkey
- Party: Justice and Development Party (2011-2014); Democratic Progress Party (2014-2015)
- Education: Istanbul University; University of Manchester

İdris Bal (born 25 April 1968 in Altıntaş Kütahya) is a Turkish politician and academic who led the Democratic Progress Party (DGP) between 4 November 2014 and 31 March 2015. He serves as a Member of Parliament for Kütahya Province, having been first elected to the Grand National Assembly in the 2011 general election from the Justice and Development Party (AKP). He is seen as a close supporter of Fethullah Gülen, having left the AKP following a dispute between AKP Prime Minister Recep Tayyip Erdoğan and Gülen movement in 2013. He founded the DGP in 2014, which is seen as the political force of Gülenism in Turkey. He is a graduate from the Faculty of Political Studies at Istanbul University and pursued a doctorate at the University of Manchester in the United Kingdom. He was a visiting academic at Harvard University in the United States and a lecturer at Başkent University in Ankara. He is married with six children and speaks fluent English. On 31 March, Bal resigned from his party and launched an attack against the Gülen Movement, accusing it and the government of censorship.
