= 7th Corps (Turkey) =

Corps of the Turkish Land Forces

- Founded: 1921
- Country: Turkey
- Branch: Turkish Army
- Type: Infantry
- Size: Corps
- Part of: Second Army
- Garrison/HQ: Yenişehir, Diyarbakır
- Engagements: PKK-Turkey conflict (1978-present); Turkey–ISIL conflict (2013-present)

Commanders
- Lieutenant general: Bahtiyar Ersay

The 7th Corps is a field corps of the Turkish Land Forces. Its headquarters is in Yenişehir, Diyarbakır, and it is part of the 2nd Army. It protects Hakkâri, Şırnak, Şanlıurfa and Siirt against foreign threats that may come from abroad.

For over five decades after it was established, the corps headquarters operated out of the historic İçkale (Inner Castle) complex within the old walled city of Sur. It utilized historically significant structures, including the very building that Mustafa Kemal Atatürk used as his headquarters during World War I.

In 1924, with Cafer Tayyar Eğilmez commanding the corps, including the 2nd and 17th Divisions, it was involved in putting down the Assyrian rebellion. The 14th Cavalry Brigade had been dispatched from the West, after the conclusion of the Great Offensive, to Urfa. At Urfa it appears to have been expanded into the 14th Cavalry Division and in that form it took part in the Assyrian rebellion, as well as the Sheikh Said rebellion.

Lieutenant-General Mehmet Kenan Dalbaşar died on March 23, 1935, while serving as the Commander of the 7th Corps.

In 1947 the corps, with its headquarters at Diyakabir, comprised the 10th Division, stationed in Van, the 2nd Division, stationed in Siirt, and the 14th Cavalry Division, stationed in Urfa.

Lieutenant General Feyzi Mengüç served as commander of the 7th Corps after 1947.

Before his brief command of Third Army in 1960, Korgeneral Danyal Yurdatapan had commanded 7th Corps. All remaining cavalry units of the TLF appear to have been finally disestablished in 1960-1965.

The now-14th Armoured Cavalry Brigade was still serving at Kars in 1968-70.

In 1973, the Turkish Armed Forces handed over their historic structures in İçkale to civil authorities to preserve the ancient layout. At this point, the 7th Corps Command moved its active administrative offices and base operations into the expansive, modern General Galip Deniz Barracks complex located in the neighboring Yenişehir district. The old headquarters was subsequently restored by the military and converted into the Commander Atatürk Museum.

In the late 1980s it was listed as part of the 2nd Army.

Kemalettin Eken previously commanded the corps many years ago.

== Twenty-first century ==
On 8 August 2006, Hurriyet reported that a new tactical border Infantry Division was being established; a decision had been taken to form the 3rd Tactical Infantry Division in the district of Yuksekova. Hurriyat noted that Hakkari is already the home to the Mountain Warfare Commando Brigade, the Provincial Gendarmerie Regimental Headquarters, the Yuksekova Brigade, the Semdinli Tactical Regimental Headquarters and the Cukurca Tactical Regimental Headquarters, and so it said that important changes were being undertaken at the headquarters in order to ensure that the units worked more effectively and with better coordination. Command of this newly formed division has been given to Maj Gen Yurdaer Olcan.

Headquartered at Şenoba in the Uludere district of Şırnak, the 48th Border Brigade is permanently tasked with countering cross-border terrorism, weapon smuggling, and illegal border crossings originating from Iraq. In March 2015, the brigade's forward operating bases along the border perimeter came under sniper fire originating from the Iraqi side of the border, prompting retaliatory artillery strikes by the Turkish Armed Forces. In September 2016, a force of approximately 600 soldiers (two tactical battalions) from the brigade advanced four kilometres into Iraqi territory near the border to neutralize a moving detachment of PKK militants. In March 2017 during "Operation Tanker Sergeant Ahmet Suna," the brigade used UAVs to locate and target transit positions in the Kumar Tepe border region. Operating under the umbrella of the 23rd Infantry Division, the 48th Border Brigade coordinated a joint air-ground strike five kilometres inside the Iraqi border in March 2018, mapping and neutralizing a militant training camp in the Haftanin region using surveillance drones and guided munitions.

In December 2024 the 23rd Infantry Division was reported to be operating in the Corps' general area, on border duties. The 23rd Division may now be a border formation (tr:23. Piyade Tümeni).

Some other units of the corps may include the Hakkari Mountain and Commando Brigade (5th Commando Brigade) (Hakkari); the 3rd Commando Brigade (Siirt); the 6th Commando Brigade (Akçay, Şırnak); the 16th Mechanized Infantry Brigade (Devegeçidi, Diyarbakır); the 70th Mechanized Infantry Brigade (Kızıltepe, Mardin); and the 107th Artillery Regiment (Siverek, Şanlıurfa).
