= Yaşar Güler =

Turkish general and politician (born 1954)

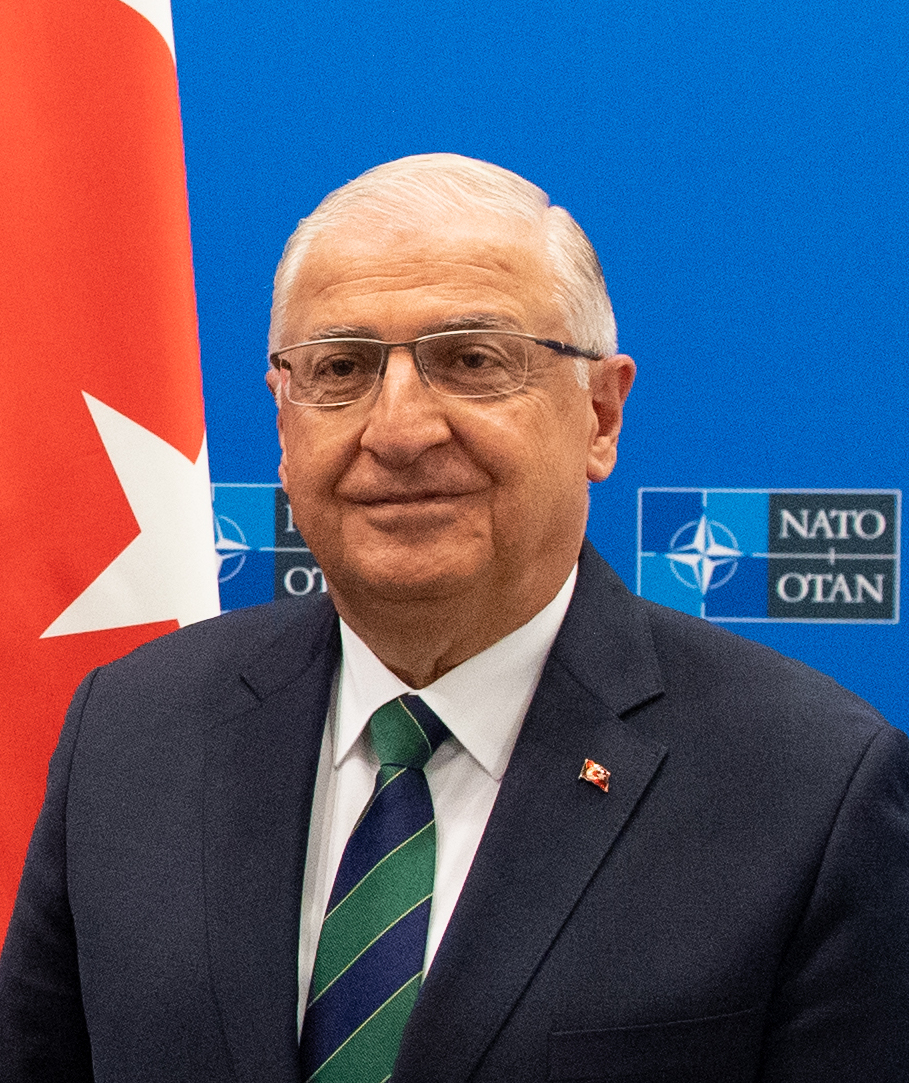
- Güler in 2023

Minister of National Defense
- Incumbent
- Assumed office 4 June 2023
- President: Recep Tayyip Erdoğan
- Preceded by: Hulusi Akar

30th Chief of the Turkish General Staff
- In office 16 July 2018 – 3 June 2023
- Preceded by: Hulusi Akar
- Succeeded by: Metin Gürak

Chief of the Turkish Land Forces
- In office 23 August 2017 – 16 July 2018
- Preceded by: Salih Zeki Çolak
- Succeeded by: Ümit Dündar

General Commander of the Turkish Gendarmerie
- In office 28 July 2016 – 21 August 2017
- Preceded by: Galip Mendi
- Succeeded by: Arif Çetin

Second chief of the General Staff of the Turkish Armed Forces
- In office 30 August 2013 – 28 July 2016
- Preceded by: Hulusi Akar
- Succeeded by: Ümit Dündar

Personal details
- Born: 18 September 1954 (age 71) Ardahan, Turkey
- Spouse: Demet Güler
- Children: 1
- Education: Kuleli Military High School
- Alma mater: Turkish Military Academy; Army War Institute
- Awards: TAF Medal of Honor; TAF Medal of Distinguished Courage and Self-Sacrifice; TAF Medal of Distinguished Service
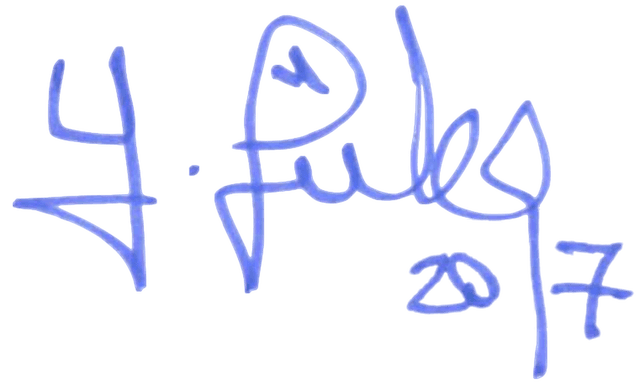
- Signature

Military service
- Allegiance: Turkey
- Branch/service: Turkish Land Forces
- Years of service: 1974–2023
- Rank: General
- Commands: General Staff of the Republic of Turkey; Commander of Land Forces; Gendarmerie General Command; Deputy Chief of the General Staff; General Command of Mapping; 4th Corps; Chief of the Intelligence of the Turkish General Staff; Planning and Coordination Department of the General Staff; 10th Infantry Brigade Command

Yaşar Güler (born 18 September 1954) is a retired Turkish general currently serving as the Minister of National Defense. He previously served as the 30th Chief of the General Staff of the Turkish Armed Forces from 2018 to 2023.

== Career ==
He enlisted in the army in 1974, which was effectively the start of his military career. He spent two years prior to his enlistment studying at the Turkish Military Academy. In the 10 years since joining the land forces, he served in various infantry and signals companies, acting as the commander of one of them. In 1986 he graduated from the Army War College with honors and graduated with the rank of a staff officer. He was promoted to brigadier general in 2001 and assumed responsibility for the 10th Infantry Brigade Command and the Planning and Coordination Department of the General Staff.

4 years later, he was promoted to major general and took over duties of the General Staff and at the School of Communications and Electronic Information Systems of the TAF in Ankara. In 2009, he was appointed to a position in the General Command of the 4th Army Corps, serving for over 2 years, this time as lieutenant general. From 2011 to 2013, he was the chief of intelligence for the armed forces, a position where he performed his duties before becoming the Deputy Chief of Staff in 2013, where he was also promoted to general and became the commander of the Gendarmerie General Command in 2016–2017, and became the Commander of Land Forces in 2017–2018, serving in those positions for a combined 5 years. On July 10, 2018, he was appointed by President Recep Tayyip Erdogan as the 30th General Staff of the Republic of Turkey of the Armed Forces, succeeding Hulusi Akar, who was promoted to the post of Minister of National Defence that same day.

== Personal life ==
He is currently married to Demet Güler, with whom he has a child. He has two grandchildren.

Military offices
Preceded by Hulusi Akar	Minister of National Defense; 4 June 2023 – Present	Succeeded by Incumbent
Preceded by Hulusi Akar	Chief of the General Staff of Turkey; 10 July 2018 – 3 June 2023	Succeeded by Metin Gürak
Preceded by Salih Zeki Çolak	Commander of the Turkish Army; 23 August 2017 – 10 July 2018	Succeeded by Ümit Dündar
Preceded by İbrahim Yaşar	General Commanders of the Turkish Gendarmerie; 28 July 2016 – 21 August 2017	Succeeded by Arif Çetin
Preceded by Hulusi Akar	TAF General Staff II. List of presidents 30 August 2013 – 28 July 2016	Succeeded by Ümit Dündar
Preceded by İsmail Hakkı Pekin	Chief of General Staff Intelligence; 2011 – 2013	Succeeded by Mehmet Daysal
