= Zekai Aksakallı =

Turkish Army general (born 1961)

- Born: 25 December 1961 (age 64); Erzurum, Turkey
- Military career
- Allegiance: Turkey
- Branch: Special Forces
- Service years: 1984–2020
- Rank: Korgeneral
- Commands: Special Forces
- Conflicts: Turkish involvement in the Syrian Civil War: Operation Euphrates Shield; 2016 Dabiq offensive; Battle of al-Bab; 2016 Turkish coup d'état attempt

Lieutenant-General Zekai Aksakallı (born 25 December 1961) is a Turkish Special Forces Command commander. He graduated from the Turkish Military Academy. He was commander of the Turkish forces inside Syria in 2016 following the coup d'état attempt.

== Biography ==
Born in Erzurum, Zekai Aksakallı is the father of two children. At the age of 17 he attended Erzurum High School and he represented Turkey in the high school cross-country championship organized in Austria for a number of years and became 27th among 397 athletes. Gen. Aksakallı has been serving as commander of the Special Forces Command since 2013. Aksakallı played a major role with his staff sergeant Sgt. Maj. Ömer Halisdemir in the prevention of the 2016 Turkish coup d'état attempt. As a result of his success, he was promoted to lieutenant general at the YAŞ meeting on 28 July 2016. The General Staff Special Forces Commander, Major General Zekai Aksakallı, who reacted against the coup attempt of Fetullahçı Terrorist Organization (FETO) by saying "Terrorists will not be successful", caught attention in Turkish public opinion. He was commander of the Turkish forces inside Syria in 2016 following the coup d'état attempt.

Zekai Aksakallı speaks English. He is an active officer of Turkish Armed Forces since 1984.

== Ranks ==
Year	General ranks	Duties
2009	Brigadier general	Special Forces Command I.
2013	Major general	Special Forces Commander
2016	Lieutenant general	Special Forces Command; 2nd Corps Commander

Military offices
Preceded by Halil Soysal	Commander of the Turkish Special Forces; 2013-2017	Succeeded by Ahmet Ercan Çorbacı
