= List of attacks by the Revolutionary People's Liberation Party/Front =

This is a list of attacks by the Revolutionary People's Liberation Party/Front (Turkish: Devrimci Halk Kurtuluş Partisi-Cephesi or DHKP-C), a far-left terrorist group that existed in Turkey. Casualties includes any perpetrators.

Date	Location	Type	Fatalities	Injuries	Note(s)
3 January 2001	(Turkey) Istanbul	Suicide Bombing	2	7	2001 Şişli suicide bombing
10 September 2001	(Turkey) Istanbul	Suicide Bombing	4	23	2001 Istanbul suicide bombing: On 10 September 2001, a suicide bomber killed himself and three other people in Istanbul, being the bloodiest attack perpetrated by the group.
20 May 2003	(Turkey) Ankara	Attempted Suicide Bombing	1	0	DHKP/C female suicide bomber Sengul Akkurt's explosive belt detonated by accident on 20 May 2003 in Ankara, in a restroom, while she was preparing for an action.
24 July 2004	(Turkey) Istanbul	Suicide Bombing	4	15	On 24 July 2004, another detonation, on a bus in Istanbul, occurred, killing Semiran Polat of DHKP-C and three more people and injuring 15 others.
1 July 2005	(Turkey) Ankara	Attempted Suicide Bombing	1	0	On 1 July 2005, Eyüp Beyaz of DHKP-C was killed in Ankara in an attempted suicide bombing attack on the ministry of justice.
29 April 2009	(Turkey) Ankara	Attempted Assassination	0	1	On 29 April 2009, Didem Akman of DHKP-C was wounded in her attempt to assassinate Hikmet Sami Türk at Bilkent University right before a lecture in Constitution Law. Akman and her accomplice S. Onur Yılmaz were caught.
11 September 2012	(Turkey) Istanbul	Suicide Bombing	2	7	2012 Istanbul suicide bombing: On 11 September 2012, a suicide bomber, a DHKP/C militant, blew himself up at the Sultangazi district in Istanbul killing himself and a police officer. The Turkish National Police identified the bomber as İbrahim Çuhadar, a member of DHKP/C.
1 February 2013	(Turkey) Ankara	Suicide Bombing	2	3	2013 United States embassy bombing in Ankara: On 1 February 2013, a suicide bomber, a DHKP/C militant, blew himself up at the US embassy in Ankara, killing a Turkish security guard and wounding several other people. Istanbul police identified the bomber as Ecevit Şanlı, a member of DHKP/C.
19 March 2013	(Turkey) Ankara	Bombing	0	0	On 19 March 2013, DHKP/C militants conducted a double attack against the ruling Justice and Development Party (AKP) headquarters and the Justice Ministry. Responsibility for the attacks was claimed by the DHKP/C.
21 September 2013	(Turkey) Ankara	Bombing	1	1	In September 2013, two DHKP/C members attacked the headquarters of the General Directorate of Security with rockets. One of them, who was killed in the attack, had been involved in the 19 March attack on the AKP headquarters. Perpetrators Muharrem Karataş was killed and Serdar Polat was injured in clashes with security forces.
6 January 2015	(Turkey) Istanbul	Suicide Bombing	2	1	2015 Istanbul suicide bombing: On 6 January 2015, a female suicide bomber blew herself up at a police station in the Sultanahmet district of Istanbul, killing one police officer and injuring another. DHKP-C claimed responsibility for the attack, saying it was meant "to punish (the) murderers of Berkin Elvan" and "to call to account the fascist state that protects AKP's corrupt, stealing ministers". Berkin Elvan was a 15-year-old boy who was killed by a tear-gas canister fired by a police officer during the 2013 Istanbul protests. The group also claimed that the suicide bomber was Elif Sultan Kalsen. After being called to a criminal medical center to identify the body, Kalsen's family denied the claims, stating that it was not their daughter. On 8 January 2015, the perpetrator was identified as Diana Ramazova, a Chechen-Russian citizen from Dagestan. Turkish police are investigated Ramazova's possible links to al-Qaeda or the Islamic State of Iraq and the Levant. Further investigation revealed that suspect had photos with insurgents from ISIS. The DHKP-C on 8 January removed the statement claiming responsibility from its website without giving any explanation. As of yet, it is not known why they took responsibility for the attack.
10 August 2015	(Turkey) Istanbul	Attempted Shooting	0	0	On 10 August 2015, two women from the DHKP/C staged an attack on the U.S. consulate in Istanbul; one of the attackers, identified as Hatice Asik, was captured along with her rifle.
6 February 2024	(Turkey) Istanbul	Shooting	3	6	On 6 February 2024, two DHKP/C members attacked the Istanbul Justice Palace wounding three police officers and three civilians. Both attackers and one civilian were killed.
