= January 2016 Istanbul bombing =

ISIL suicide bombing in Turkey

Coordinates: 41°0′21.24″N 28°58′31.43″E

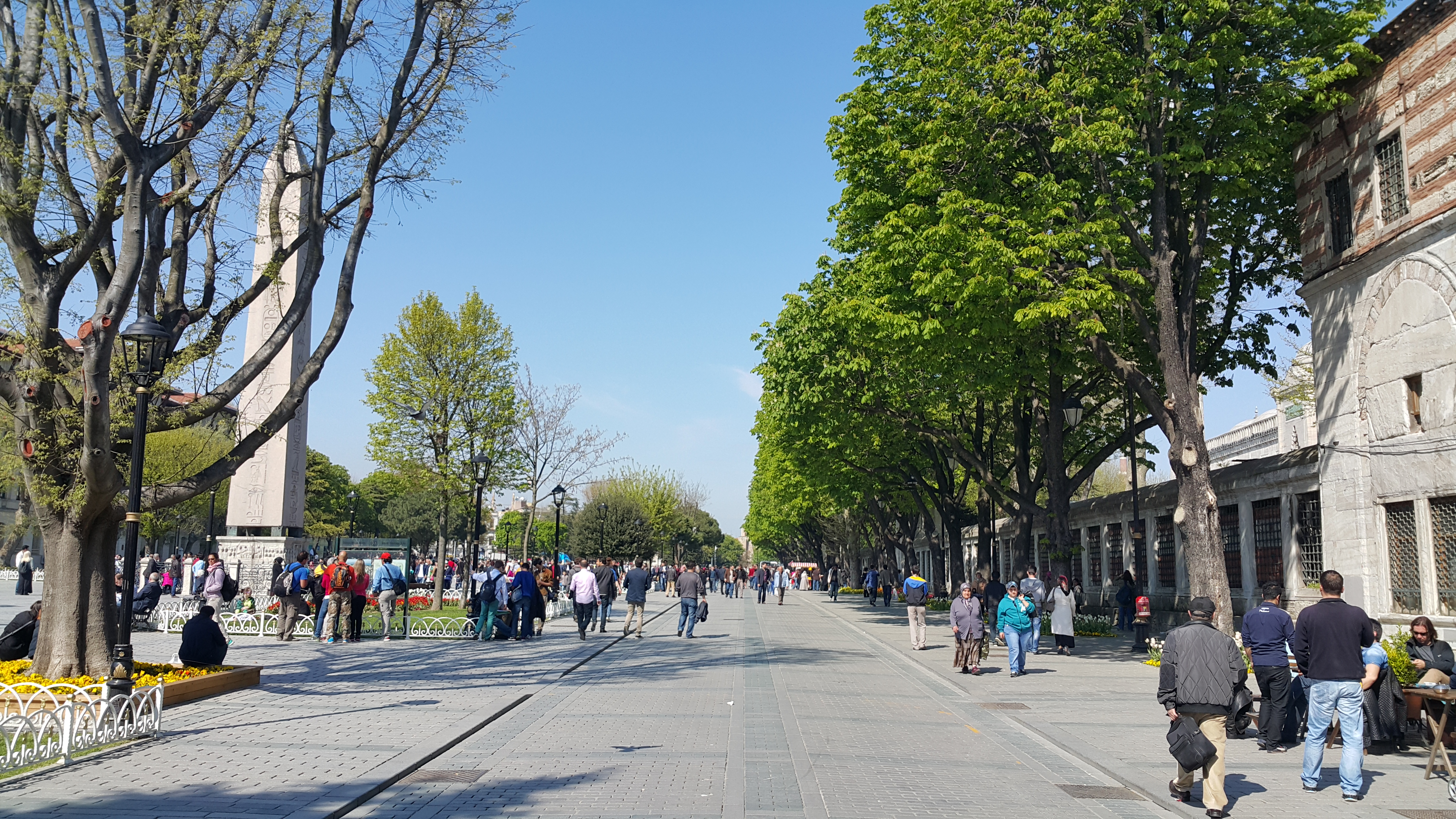
- Sultanahmet Square and the Obelisk of Theodosius.

- Location: Sultanahmet, Fatih, Istanbul, Turkey
- Date: 12 January 2016
- Target: Foreign tourists
- Attack type: Suicide bombing
- Deaths: 14 (including the perpetrator)
- Injuries: 9
- Perpetrator: Islamic State
- No. of participants: 1 (Nabil Fadli)

On 12 January 2016, a suicide attack in Istanbul's historic Sultanahmet district killed 13 people, all foreigners, and injured 14 others. The attack occurred at 10:20 local time, near the Blue Mosque and the Hagia Sophia, an area popular among tourists. The attacker was Nabil Fadli (Arabic: نبيل فضلي), a Syrian member of the Islamic State.

== Background ==
The last major attack on Sultanahmet Square occurred on 6 January 2015, when a suicide bomber detonated herself at a police station. The DHKP-C initially took responsibility for the attack but later retracted this claim. It was later revealed that the suicide bomber was Diana Ramazanova (Russian: Диана Рамазова), a national of Dagestan origin with links to ISIL.

In 2015, Turkey suffered two major bombing attacks. In July, 33 people were killed in an ISIL suicide attack in the town of Suruç, near Turkey's border with Syria. In October, two suicide bombers detonated explosives which killed more than 100 people outside Ankara's main train station as people gathered for a peace rally. It was Turkey's deadliest attack. The prosecutor's office said it was carried out by a local ISIL cell.

In December 2015, Turkish police detained two suspected ISIL militants believed to be planning suicide attacks during New Year's celebrations in central Ankara, following which the government of Turkey cancelled planned New Year's celebrations in Ankara. There were additional arrests connected to ISIL on 11 January of three men arrested en route to Diyarbakir.

== Attack ==
The blast struck at 10:20 a.m. local time (08:20 UTC) at a park that is home to the landmark Obelisk of Theodosius, when the bomber walked up to a tour group standing in Sultanahmet Square and blew himself up. The obelisk is some 25 metres (82 ft) from the historic Blue Mosque and the blast was heard from several surrounding areas in the city. Police cordoned off the area. Graphic images of the explosion and its aftermath spread across social media.

Nationality	Deaths	Wounded	Total
Germany	12	6	18
Peru	1	1	2
China	0	1	1
South Korea	0	1	1
Total	13	9	22

Thirteen were killed in total; twelve were German tourists, and one was Peruvian. The Guardian reported that "the bombing happened close to the German built fountain next to the plaza between the mosques of Hagia Sophia and Sultan Ahmet." News media reported that nine people were wounded including six Germans, one Chinese, one Peruvian and a South Korean.

=== Perpetrator ===
Turkish authorities identified the suicide bomber as Nabil Fadli (born 1988), a Syrian. According to the Saudi Arabian Interior Ministry, Fadli was born in Saudi Arabia; he and his family left that country when he was eight years old, and Fadli grew up in Manbij in northern Syria, a region ever under ISIL control. Fadli's family is ethnically Turkman. According to reports, Fadli was "a regular foot soldier" in ISIL and his brother committed a suicide bombing at an airport several months earlier.

Fadli entered Turkey on January 5, 2016, and had been registered and fingerprinted as a refugee. His name had not set off security alerts.

== Reaction ==
Turkish Prime Minister Ahmet Davutoğlu said firstly that the perpetrator of the attack was a 28-year-old Syrian man who was affiliated with ISIL. He further said that the bomber was not on Turkey's militant watch-list and was believed to have recently crossed into Turkey from Syria. Davutoğlu also called German Chancellor Angela Merkel to offer his condolences. Davutoğlu immediately convened a security meeting with the Turkish interior minister. He said "We pledged to battle the [ISIL] until it no longer "remains a threat" to Turkey or the world. Turkey won't backtrack in its struggle against Daesh [i.e., ISIL] by even one step. This terror organization, the assailants and all of their connections will be found and they will receive the punishments they deserve."

Following the attack, the Turkish government's Radio and Television Supreme Council imposed a temporary broadcast ban on images of to the bombing (under a 2011 law allowing such censorship), and the ban was affirmed by an order from an Istanbul court.

=== International reactions ===
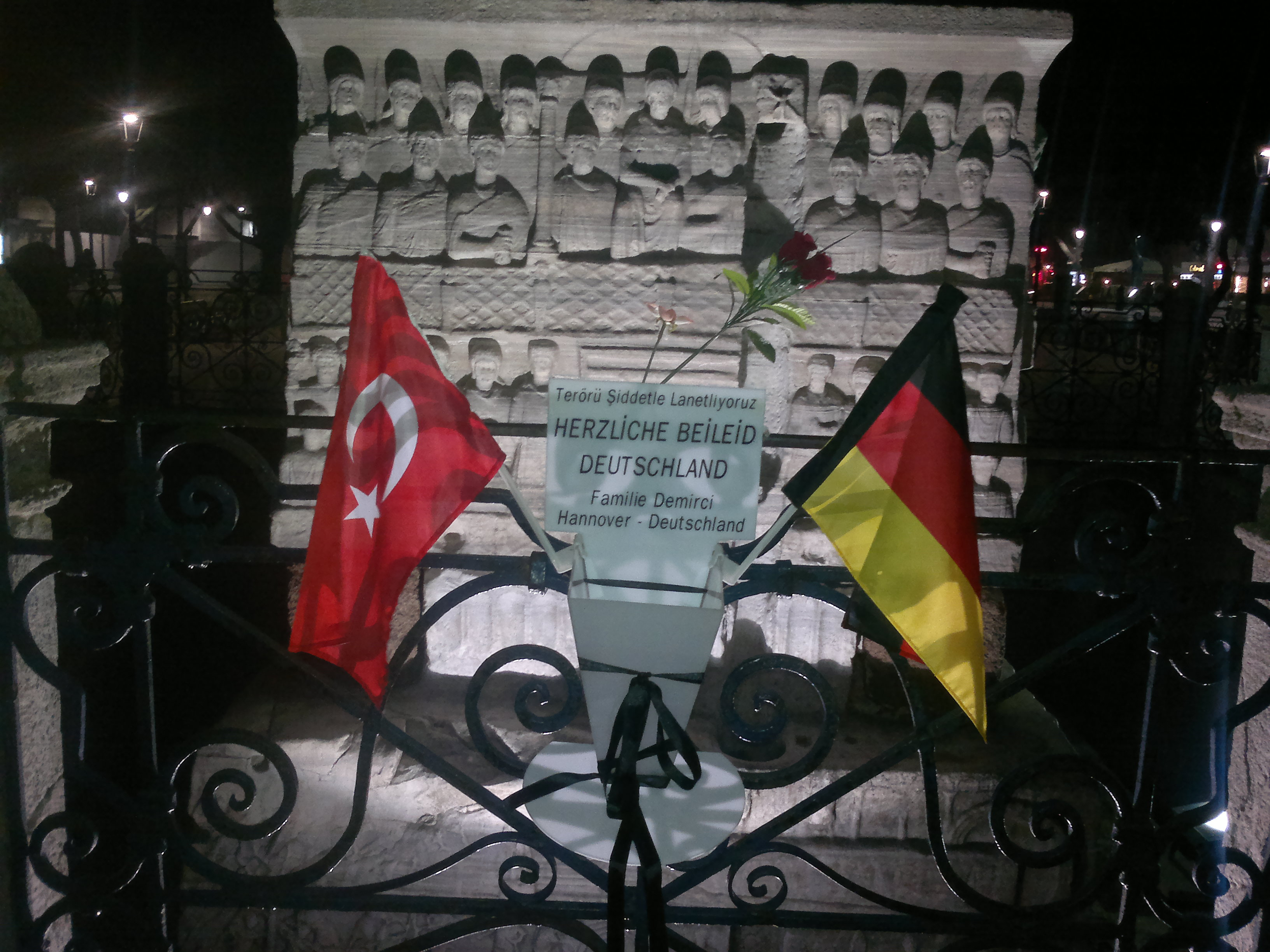
Flowers and flags of Turkey and Germany near Obelisk of Theodosius. January 2016

==== Supranational ====
- European Union: In a letter to Turkish President Recep Tayyip Erdoğan, President of the European Commission Jean-Claude Juncker expressed his "heartfelt condolences" to Erdoğan and to the people of Turkey.

==== States ====
- Germany: German Chancellor Angela Merkel expressed "serious concern" about the casualties, saying "a German tourist group had been affected." Germany's foreign ministry has on its website urged German tourists in Istanbul to avoid large crowds and tourist attractions and warned that further violent clashes and "terrorist attacks" were expected across Turkey.
- Malaysia: The Malaysian government has strongly condemned the attack and expressed its deepest condolences to the government and people of Turkey as well to the families and victims involved.
- Pakistan: The Ministry of Foreign Affairs, in a press statement, condemned the attack. The President and Prime Minister said the people and Government of Pakistan stand firmly with their Turkish brethren at this hour of grief.
- Singapore: Prime Minister Lee Hsien Loong and Minister for Foreign Affairs Vivian Balakrishnan have condemned the attack and stand with the Turkish people and government.
- United States: State Department: "The United States strongly condemns the terrorist attack today in Sultanahmet Square in Istanbul, Turkey. We extend our deepest condolences to the families of those killed, and wish a quick and full recovery to those injured. The United States reaffirms our strong commitment to work with Turkey, a NATO Ally and valued member of the Counter-ISIL Coalition, to combat the shared threat of terrorism."

== See also ==
- List of terrorist incidents, January–June 2016
- List of terrorist incidents linked to ISIL
