= Revolutionary People's Liberation Party/Front =

Revolutionary People's Liberation Party/Front Devrimci Halk Kurtuluş Partisi-Cephesi
- Abbreviation: DHKP-C
- Founder: Dursun Karataş
- Founded: 30 March 1994
- Preceded by: Revolutionary Left
- Headquarters: Unknown (illegal party)
- Armed wing: DHKC/SPB; Silahlı Propaganda Birlikleri
- Ideology: Communism; Marxism–Leninism; Guevarism; Foco theory; Socialist patriotism; Revolutionary socialism
- Political position: Far-left
- Colors: Red, Gold
- Slogan: Umudun adı DHKP-C! Titre oligarşi Parti-Cephe geliyor! Kurtuluş Kavgada, Zafer Cephede! (transl. The name of hope is DHKP-C! Tremble, the oligarchy, as the Party/Front is coming! Liberation is in the Fight, Victory is in the Front)

Party flag

Website
- https://www.halkinsesitv.net

The Revolutionary People's Liberation Party/Front (Turkish: Devrimci Halk Kurtuluş Partisi-Cephesi or DHKP-C) is a Marxist–Leninist communist party terrorist organisation in Turkey. It was founded in 1978 as Revolutionary Left (Turkish: Devrimci Sol or Dev Sol), and has been involved in a militant campaign against the Republic of Turkey since the 1980s. It was renamed in 1994 after factional infighting. It is classified as a terrorist group by Turkey, the United States, the United Kingdom, the European Union and Japan.

In 1980, the group began targeting active and retired Turkish politicians and security and military personnel, including assassinating prime minister Nihat Erim on 19 July. By 1990, it broadened its activities to include attacks on foreign entities, specifically targeting U.S. military and diplomatic staff and installations.

== Structure ==
Devrimci Halk Kurtuluş Partisi-Cephesi or DHKP-C (alternatively DHKP/C) refers to two related entities. The former ("Party") refers to the group's political activities, while the latter ("Front") is a reference to the group's military operations.

The group espouses a Marxist–Leninist ideology and holds an anti-U.S., anti-NATO position. It considers that the Turkish state is under the control of Western imperialism and seeks to end this control by violent and democratic means. In Turkey, the group is regarded as the primary exponent of "Marxist violence."

It finances its activities chiefly through donations raised in Turkey and Europe.

== History ==
=== Foundation ===
The organization was originally formed in 1978 by Dursun Karataş as Revolutionary Left (Turkish: Devrimci Sol or Dev Sol), a splinter faction of Devrimci Yol ("Revolutionary Way"), which splintered from the People's Liberation Party-Front of Turkey (THKP-C), which in its turn was a splinter of Revolutionary Youth Federation (commonly known in Turkish as Dev Genç). The group was relaunched with its current name in 1994.

=== During 1980s ===
In 1980, Dev Sol claimed responsibility for a number of assassinations, including those of Gün Sazak on 27 May, and Nihat Erim on 19 July. Since the late 1980s, the group has mostly targeted current and retired Turkish security and military officials.

=== Insurgency (1990–present) ===
Revolutionary People's Liberation Front
- Devrimci Halk Kurtuluş Cephesi
- Flag of the DHKC
- Dates active: 1994 – present
- Group: Silahlı Propaganda Birlikleri
- Active regions: Turkey
- Ideology: Communism; Marxism–Leninism; Guevarism; Foco theory; Socialist patriotism; Revolutionary socialism; Anti-imperialism
- Part of: Revolutionary People's Liberation Party/Front
- Wars: the DHKP/C insurgency in Turkey

It began a new campaign against foreign interests in 1990, which included attacks against U.S. military and diplomatic personnel and facilities.

To protest what it describes as American imperialism during the Gulf War, the DHKP-C assassinated two U.S. military personnel, wounded an Air Force officer and bombed more than 20 U.S. and NATO military, commercial and cultural facilities.

It is significant that the only American killed by terrorists during the First Gulf War was a victim of Dev Sol. U.S. Halliburton subsidiary, Vinnell-Brown & Root (VBR) Regional Manager John Gandy was murdered in his Istanbul office in February 1991 by a well-trained Dev Sol hit team that gained access to the office building by wearing Turkish National Police (TNP) uniforms. After tying Gandy to a chair the Dev Sol operatives shot him multiple times in the head. The terrorists then wrote anti-US graffiti stating "Bush go home" on the office walls with the victim's blood. The secretary, Mary Senyuz and the accountant Ali Ferah and Canan, his assistant were tied up in a separate room whilst the murder of Mr. Gandy took place in his office. It was noted that Mr. Gandy's predecessor, Stephen Hubbard, was actually the targeted victim. However he had left for a directorship position at VBRs' headquarters in Ankara just a few months prior. Mr. Hubbard returned to Istanbul directly after the murder, and shut down this regional headquarters.

Although Dev Sol was under active investigation by the American, British, French, Austrian and Danish intelligence and security services, it posed a significant challenge for counter-terrorist agents because it was one of the few terrorist organizations (at that time) to employ professional operational and counterintelligence tradecraft. It used sophisticated surveillance and counter-surveillance techniques, it employed multi-layer assassination squads with surveillance, primary and secondary shooters, and it successfully exfiltrated its operatives back and forth between Western Europe and Turkey as needed. It skillfully employed professionally forged documents and disguise, and it has been claimed by opponents that it preyed on innocent Turks living in Europe, extorting money from them in exchange for "protection." However, the DHKP-C denies any involvement in extortion and it is not unknown for criminal gangs to use the name of the DHKP-C and other armed political groups as a cover for their activities without any authorization from or actual connection to those organizations.

On 13 August 1991, Andrew Blake, the head of British Commercial Union in Istanbul, was killed in a shooting. His killing was claimed by DHKP-C. However, the Turkish wing of Islamic Jihad also claimed the killing as their work. Dev Sol also claimed the assassinations of Hiram Abas (1990), Memduh Ünlütürk, İsmail Selen, Adnan Ersöz and Hulusi Sayın (1991) and Kemal Kayacan (1992) – all retired figures of Turkish military or intelligence.

In its next significant act as DHKP-C on 9 January 1996, it assassinated Özdemir Sabancı, a prominent Turkish businessman, and two others: an associate Haluk Görgün and a secretary Nilgün Hasefe. The murders were carried out by hired assassins who had been given access to the Sabanci Towers by a member, the student Fehriye Erdal, working there at that time. DHKP-C later claimed responsibility for the act.

On 4 June 1999 at approximately 6:00, 2 men of the DHKP-C armed with pistols and a light antitank weapon (LAW) attempted to attack the Consulate General of the United States, Istanbul. The attack was conducted in order to protest against Operation Allied Force and to promote the brotherhood between the DHKP-C and the Yugoslav People. Both attackers were killed in a firefight with Turkish Police.

==== Hunger strike in prisons ====
Protesting against the new prison order (where prisoners would be held in isolation) inmates from DHKP-C, TKP/ML and TKİP started a hunger strike on 26 October 2000. Between that date and 19 November 2000, a total of 816 prisoners in 18 prisons joined the hunger strike.

==== Escalation (2001 to present) ====
2001 DHKP-C added suicide bombings to its operations in 2001 with attacks against Turkish police in January and September of that year. On 10 September 2001, a suicide bomber killed himself and three other people in Istanbul.

2002–2003 Security operations in Turkey and elsewhere have weakened the group, however. DHKP-C did not conduct any major attacks in 2003, although a DHKP-C female suicide bomber Sengul Akkurt's explosive belt detonated by accident on 20 May 2003 in Ankara, in a restroom, while she was preparing for an action.

2004 On 24 July 2004, another mistaken detonation, on a bus in Istanbul, occurred, killing Semiran Polat of DHKP-C and three more people and injuring 15 others.

2005 On 1 July 2005, Eyüp Beyaz of DHKP-C was killed in Ankara in an attempted suicide bombing attack on the ministry of justice.

2006 In late February 2006, female member Fehriye Erdal was convicted in Belgium, while under house arrest. However, shortly before her conviction she escaped, and as of 2011, still has not been found.

2008 The group's Istanbul commander, Asuman Akça, was arrested in 2008 on the grounds that she was planning to assassinate Turkish Prime Minister Recep Tayyip Erdoğan. She was tried, but the court failed to reach a verdict and, as she had already been in custody for four years, she was released pending another trial in 2012. Akça then told the media that she would reveal links between the DHKP-C and the Ergenekon organization. Shortly afterwards, she was shot in the head. The man accused of killing her, who has been described as a member of the Kurdistan Workers' Party (PKK) as well as the DHKP-C and MLKP, was alleged by police of having told them that he had orders from DHKP-C to assassinate Akça because of her plans to reveal the group's links with Ergenekon.

2009 On 29 April 2009, Didem Akman of DHKP-C was wounded in her attempt to assassinate Hikmet Sami Türk at Bilkent University right before a lecture in constitutional law. Akman and her accomplice S. Onur Yılmaz were caught.

2012 On 11 September 2012, a suicide bomber, a DHKP-C militant, blew himself up at the Sultangazi district in Istanbul killing himself, a Turkish national and a police officer. The Turkish National Police identified the bomber as İbrahim Çuhadar, a member of DHKP-C.

DHKP-C on 11 December 2012 Gaziosmanpasa also killed a policeman.

2013 On 1 February 2013, a suicide bomber, a DHKP-C militant, blew himself up at the US embassy in Ankara, killing a Turkish security guard and wounding several other people. Istanbul police identified the bomber as Ecevit Şanlı, a member of DHKP-C.

On 19 March 2013, DHKP-C militants conducted a double attack against the ruling Justice and Development Party (AKP) headquarters and the Justice Ministry. Responsibility for the attacks was claimed by the DHKP-C.

In September 2013 two DHKP-C members attacked the headquarters of the General Directorate of Security with rockets. One of them, who was killed in the attack, had been involved in the 19 March attack on the AKP headquarters.

On 29 September 2013 DHKP-C sympathizers and members clash with drug gang in Maltepe where DHKP-C finds support from the local population. A young local resident, left-wing activist Hasan Ferit Gedik, was killed in clashes. Following the clashes, a group of armed DHKP-C members started to patrol the streets in Maltepe.

2015 On 6 January 2015, a female suicide bomber blew herself up at a police station in the Sultanahmet district of Istanbul, killing one police officer and injuring another. DHKP-C claimed responsibility for the attack, saying it was meant "to punish (the) murderers of Berkin Elvan" and "to call to account the fascist state that protects AKP's corrupt, stealing ministers". Berkin Elvan was a 15-year-old boy who was killed by a tear-gas canister fired by a police officer during the 2013 Istanbul protests. The group also claimed that the suicide bomber was Elif Sultan Kalsen. After being called to a criminal medical center to identify the body, Kalsen's family denied the claims, stating that it was not their daughter. On 8 January 2015, the perpetrator was identified as Diana Ramazova, a Chechen-Russian citizen from Dagestan. Turkish police are currently investigating Ramazova's possible links to al-Qaeda or the Islamic State of Iraq and the Levant. Further investigation revealed that suspect had photos with insurgents from ISIS. The DHKP-C on 8 January removed the statement claiming responsibility from its website without giving any explanation. As of yet, it is not known why they took responsibility for the attack.

On 31 March 2015 suspected members of DHKP-C took prosecutor Mehmet Selim Kiraz hostage on the sixth floor of the Istanbul Çağlayan Justice Palace. They demanded that the police announce the names of four members of the security services who they said were connected to the death of Berkin Elvan. The police negotiated with the gunmen for six hours, but eventually stormed the courthouse "because of gunshots heard from inside the prosecutor's office". The two gunmen died during the operation, while the prosecutor was badly wounded and later died of his injuries.

On 10 August 2015, two women from the DHKP-C staged an attack on the U.S. consulate in Istanbul; one of the attackers, identified as Hatice Asik, was captured along with her rifle. This was one of four of staged attacks across Istanbul, occurring, with two others targeting police stations and one targeting a military helicopter. A car-bomb was set off near the police station in the Sultanbeyli district, injuring 10, and about five hours afterwards, gunman opened fire upon security forces, killing one and wounding another 10, while 2 DHKP-C members were killed as well.

== Designation as a terrorist organization ==
The organization is listed among the 12 active terrorist organizations in Turkey as of 2007 according to the Counter-Terrorism and Operations Department of Directorate General for Security (Turkish police).

It was one of the original 18 groups on the U.S. State Department list of Foreign Terrorist Organizations when the list was first created in 1997. It also is included in 48 groups and entities to which European Union's Common Position 2001/931/CFSP on the application of specific measures to combat terrorism applies and has been a Proscribed Organisation in the United Kingdom under the Terrorism Act 2000 since 29 March 2001.

== Membership ==
Information provided by the Intelligence Resource Program of the Federation of American Scientists based on the 2003 Patterns of Global Terrorism report suggests that the organization has several dozen operatives within Turkey and a large support network in Europe.

A study carried out by the Counter-Terrorism and Operations Department of Directorate General for Security over a sample of files about people convicted of being a terrorist under Turkish laws including 826 militants from the organization and the three other currently active left-wing organizations (see reference 1) 65% of the members are aged 14 to 25, 16.8% 25 to 30 and 17.5% are older than 30. University graduates make up 20.4% of the members, high school graduates 33.5%, secondary school graduates 14%, primary school graduates 29.9% and illiterates 1,9% (while they have no sampled literate non-graduate members).

The organization recruits mainly from Turkey's Alevi minority.

=== Convictions ===
- Dursun Karataş
- Fehriye Erdal
- In December 2011, high-school teacher Meral Dönmez and university student Gülşah Işıklı held up pieces of cardboard out of the window of a lawyer's office with the text, "We do not want a rocket shield, but a democratic high school". For this, they were convicted in October 2012 to 6 years and 8 months imprisonment for "committing a crime on behalf of a terrorist organization [DHKP-C] without being a member."

== DHKP-C in Greece ==
At 2013, Greek authorities arrested four militants on two separate operations near the Greece-Turkey border, while the DHKP-C was about to organize an attack on Turkish soil.

At 2014, Greek authorities arrested a number of militants in several operations, including high-ranking members of the group.

In February 2018, a suspected member of the DHKP-C, against whom there was an Interpol red notice, was arrested while trying to enter into Greece. In June 2018, a Greek court ordered the extradition of this person to Turkey.

On 19 March 2020, a Greek counter-terrorism unit raid on two houses in Sepolia and Exarcheia, resulted in the arrest of 26 suspected DHKP-C members and the seizure of heavy weaponry including anti-materiel guns.

=== 2017 assassination plan against Erdoğan in Athens ===
In November 2017, Greek police raided apartments in Athens and detained nine Turks (one woman and eight men) plotting to assassinate Recep Tayyip Erdoğan using rockets, during his visit to Greece at 2017. The group had planned to launch rockets at both sides of Erdoğan's convoy as he traveled through Athens. Another group would have supported the planned assault on the official car by attacking the vehicles from the rear, according to a plan captured by the Greek authorities. In the plan, Erdoğan is codenamed "the scorpion." The plot, included rockets, handmade grenades and Molotov cocktails. The Greek police also searched for weaponry and ammunition buried in large plastic barrels at the Parnitha Mountain. One of the detainees, Hasan Biber, had been wanted by Greek police in connection with an arms and explosives haul off the Greek island of Chios, in 2013.

== See also ==
- List of illegal political parties in Turkey
- List of attacks by the Revolutionary People's Liberation Party/Front
- People's Liberation Party-Front of Turkey
- Popular Front for the Liberation of Palestine
