= Ersöz =

Ersöz is a Turkish surname. Notable people with the surname include:

- Adnan Ersöz (1917–1991), Turkish general
- Levent Ersöz (born 1954), Turkish general
- Tufan Ersöz (born 1980), Turkish basketball player
- Gurbetelli Ersöz (1965–1997) Kurdish journalist
