= 2008 United States consulate in Istanbul attack =

Terrorist incident in Turkey

Coordinates: 41°07′02″N 29°02′49″E

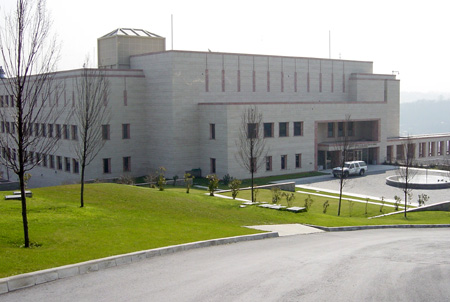
- U.S. Consulate in Istanbul
- Location: Consulate of the United States, Istanbul, Turkey
- Date: July 9, 2008; 11:00 local time. (0800 GMT) – 11:15 local time. (0815 GMT)
- Target: American consulate
- Attack type: Gunfire at the US Consulate
- Deaths: 6 (Including 3 attackers)
- Injuries: 1
- Perpetrator: Unknown

In the morning hours on July 9, 2008, an attack on the Consulate General of the United States, Istanbul resulted in the deaths of the three gunmen and three Turkish National Police officers.

The attack occurred at a time when the facility was at full function. It is the responsibility of the host state to take care of security as per Article 22 of the Vienna Convention on Diplomatic Relations.

== The attack ==
All three of the attackers were Turkish nationals, and ethnic Kurds. Armed with pistols and shotguns, the attackers arrived in a car and then got out. One of them quickly opened fire near the main entrance to the compound. Footage from a security camera at the site showed, as the shootout was unfolding, three armed and bearded men emerging from a Ford Focus being used as an unlicensed taxicab, killing a traffic policeman, then running toward a guard post some 50 yards away as other policemen fired back. The vehicle left the scene, but its driver later turned himself into the authorities; he had no prior connection to the attackers. There were no casualties in the attack apart from the three attackers and three police officers.

Two of the slain police officers were identified as Erdal Oztas, 28, from the village of Karahacik located in Çorum Province, and Nedim Calik.

The NTV television network and Doğan News Agency identified the attackers as Erkan Kargın, 26, and Raif Topçıl, 20, both from the southeastern city of Bitlis and Bülent Çınar, 23, from the eastern city of Iğdır. Police did not confirm their identities, but Interior Minister Besir Atalay said two of the assailants had criminal records. It was suggested that a shotgun used by Erkan Kargın and two Glock automatic pistols were purchased with a 4,000 YTL loan, withdrawn from the Istanbul branch of a bank, by Kadir Özmen. Özmen had originally planned to attend the attack, but this plan was abandoned. A 24-page indictment, prepared by the Istanbul Public Prosecutor's Office Deputy Fikret Seçen, charged Özmen with membership of an armed terrorist organization, possession of explosives and membership in the alleged Ergenekon organization, which meant being charged with attempting to overthrow the government of the Republic of Turkey. A decision to arrest him was made, however as his ID number could not be determined, the prosecutor's office closed the investigation.

In response to the attack, the US temporarily increased security at all of its Turkish diplomatic missions.

The unsuccessful attack showed that the (new) consulate grounds were safe for the American diplomatic staff. The project management for the land acquisition and the construction of the consulate building was headed by Gary S. Lachman while he was working as the New Embassy and Consulate Team Leader at the Bureau of Overseas Buildings Operations at the U.S. Department of State.

== International reaction ==
- United States - White House spokesman, Tony Fratto said, "We strongly condemn the attack." However, he did add "I'm not yet in a position to comment on the facts or nature of the attack." US Ambassador to Turkey Ross Wilson called the assault by gunmen on a guardpost outside the US consulate in Istanbul "an obvious act of terrorism" aimed at the United States. In remarks about the death of the three police officers he said, "The persons who lost their lives are Turkish citizens and we are very sad about that." He added that "The Turkish police responded quickly and effectively. We are deeply grateful for the work that they do to protect our official U.S. government establishments here." In response to the attack, U.S. Secretary of State Condoleezza Rice said, "Obviously first of all the United States deeply regrets the loss of life and condolences go out to the families of those who were killed. I know that some policemen were among those who died and we very much appreciate what was clearly a very rapid and proper response from the government to try to deal with the security situation in front of our consulate."
- Turkey - Istanbul Governor Muammer Güler stated that "There is no doubt that this is a terrorist attack" and described the three slain policemen as "martyred." President Abdullah Gul of Turkey condemned the attack and pledged that his country would "fight against those who masterminded such acts and the mentality behind it until the end."

== Allegations of al-Qaeda involvement ==
Turkish officials initially blamed al-Qaeda, and the US did not rule out al-Qaeda support. However, the attackers had no direct connection to any transnational or indigenous terrorist group, other than possible training ties.

On July 13, 2008, one suspect was arrested and charged with membership in a terror organization in connection to the attack on the consulate. Another two individuals were also charged and released pending trials. In all, twelve individuals have been detained for questioning related to the attacks.

In December 2008, two suspected al-Qaeda members were charged over the consulate attack.

== See also ==
- Attacks on the United States
- 1998 United States embassy bombings
- 2007 Ankara bombing
- 2012 Benghazi attack
- 2013 Reyhanlı car bombings
- 2013 United States embassy bombing in Ankara
