= F-type prison =

High-security prisons in Turkey

F-Type-Prisons, officially called F-type High Security Closed Institutions for the Execution of Sentences (F tipi cezaevi / F Tipi Yüksek Güvenlikli Kapalı Ceza İnfaz Kurumu), are high-security closed prisons designated by Turkish Law 5275 on the Execution of Sentences.

Those sentenced to F-type prisons include political prisoners, members of armed organizations, people convicted of drug offences or organized crimes, and those sentenced to aggravated life imprisonment. Aggravated life imprisonment (ağırlaştırılmış müebbet hapis cezası) replaced the death penalty when it was abolished in 2002 and according to Article 47 of the Turkish Penal Code (TPC) it is a life sentence.

== History ==
Before F-type prisons were built, prisoners in Turkey were held in koğuş (dormitories) with 50 or more prisoners. In April 1991 the Turkish parliament enacted the Anti-Terror-Law (ATL), which required that:

The sentences of those convicted under the provisions of this law will be served in special penal institutions built on a system of cells constructed for one or three people... Convicted prisoners will not be permitted contact or communication with other convicted prisoners.

— Human Rights Watch, Small Group Isolation in Turkish Prisons

This law was revised in Article 1 of Law 4666 on 1 May 2001. On 29 June 2006 Article 16 of the ATL was repealed, since other provisions had been enacted.

=== "Pilot-Project" Eskişehir ===
The first high security prison was created by remodeling an existing prison that had been built in 1987 in Eskişehir and replacing the wards (dormitories) with cells. The prison was reopened in February 1991. This prison did not carry the title of Type F, but was called a "special type prison". Prisoners criticized the cell system as being like a coffin (tabutluk). In November 1991, 206 political prisoners were transferred to Eskişehir. Justice Minister Seyfi Oktay and the State Minister responsible for Human Rights, Mehmet Kahraman, visited the prison on 22 November 1991, accompanied by representatives of the Human Rights Association (HRA), the Human Rights Foundation of Turkey (HRFT), and the Turkish Medical Association (TTB). During the visit they listened to allegations of torture and ill-treatment. Two days later the Council of Ministers decided to close the prison again. In October 1995 the prison was reopened. The attempt in 1996 to transfer all prisoners on trial in Istanbul under the ATL to Eskişehir failed after 12 prisoners died during a hunger strike.

On invitation of the Turkish Government, the European Committee for the Prevention of Torture (CPT) visited the prison in Eskişehir in August 1996. It had little to criticize and found the prisoners' description of "coffin cells" far from reality.

=== Incidents in 2000 ===
In mid-2000 the discussion on F-type prisons became more controversial. Former Justice Minister Hikmet Sami Türk was determined to shift towards the cell system. Reacting against the transfer plans to the new prison (where they presumably would be held in isolation), inmates of the prisons in Bayrampaşa, Bartın, Çankırı, Çanakkale, Aydın, Bursa, Uşak, Malatya, Niğde, Buca, Ankara Central Closed Prison, Konya-Ermenek, Nevşehir, Gebze, and Ceyhan started a hunger strike on 26 October 2000. Between that date and 19 November 2000, a total of 816 prisoners in 18 prisons joined the hunger strike and declared that they would fast until death.

The compromise Justice Minister Hikmet Sami Türk offered on 9 December 2000 was not sufficient for the prisoners, so negotiations conducted by well-known personalities including Orhan Pamuk, winner of the Nobel Prize in Literature, failed. On 19 December 2000, Turkish security forces stormed 20 prisons in an action known as "Operation Return to Life". 30 prisoners and two soldiers were killed.

Transfers to the F-type prisons started immediately after Operation Return to Life. On 21 December 2000 the Ministry of Justice announced that 524 prisoners had been transferred to the F-type prisons in Edirne, Kocaeli, and Sincan. On 3 January 2001 the Justice Minister announced that 1,118 inmates and detainees from 41 prisons were on indefinite hunger strikes, while 395 were on death fasts.

=== Developments after 2000 ===
During the ongoing death fast action, more and more prisoners died. At the end of 2001 the chairs of Istanbul, İzmir and Ankara Bar Association suggested a solution called "three doors, three locks" (üç kapı, üç kilit). This would have enabled nine prisoners (three in each room) to spend time together during the day. Though the prisoners announced that they would stop their fast if the proposal was accepted, the Justice Minister Hikmet Sami Türk declared the proposal unacceptable and made the counter-offer that 10 prisoners could be together for five hours a week.

In May 2002 Hüsnü Öndül, chair of the HRA, called on the Justice Minister to enter an intensified dialogue and appealed to the prisoners to end the senseless deaths. On 28 May prisoners of almost all groups involved in the hunger strike action ended the death fast. Only the DHKP-C continued the fast.

=== End of the fast: Decree 45/1 ===
Behiç Aşçı, an Istanbul attorney, joined the death fast action in 2006. When his health deteriorated, public attention increased. At the end of the year Bülent Arınç, at that time chair of the Grand National Assembly of Turkey, met with Aşçı's relatives and representatives of non-governmental organizations. He said that the house representing the nation could not remain insensitive on a subject for which a lawyer was willing to risk his life, and indicated that the Ministry of Justice and the government would act.

After reading Decree 45/1 of the Ministry of Justice, dated 22 January 2007, Behiç Aşçı and two prisoners who were still fasting declared that they would stop. This decree, which included multiple provisions, allowed that 10 prisoners in the F-type prisons could spend 10 hours a week together, rather than five.

In and outside of prison, a total of 122 people died in connection with actions protesting isolation in F-type prisons. Many more suffered from serious diseases such as Wernicke–Korsakoff syndrome. In its 2006 Annual Report, the HRFT presented the following figures on deaths during the fast:

Number	Cause of death
32	operation "Return to Life"
48	death fasting in prison
13	continued death fasting after release
3	death during treatment
7	relatives fasting to death
5	police action against solidarity hunger strikes
14	self-immolations

One group protested by setting themselves on fire in Germany. There were another 12 victims of suicidal attacks conducted as a protest against the F-type prisons.

The Human Rights Foundation of Turkey treated 593 former prisoners suffering from Wernicke–Korsakoff syndrome. They had either been pardoned by State President Ahmet Necdet Sezer according to Article 104 of the Constitution or temporarily released according to Article 399 of the Turkish Code of Criminal Procedure (Law 1402).

== Buildings ==
All F-type prisons are built according to a certain plan. After a visit to Turkey from 16–24 July 2000, the CPT presented the following details on the F-type Prison in Sincan:

Like all F-type prisons, the establishment at Sincan consists of 103 units for three prisoners each and 59 individual units, with a total capacity of 368 inmates. Most of the accommodation is intended for adult male prisoners (72 units in two separate wings), but there are also distinct wings for women prisoners (14 units) and minors (18 units). The delegation examined a furnished model duplex unit meant for three persons, as well as a wing of single living units. The lower level living area in the duplex measured 25 m² and was connected to a corridor on one side and an exercise yard measuring 50 m² on another side. The single cells measured approximately 11 m², including a fully partitioned sanitary annex of 1.5 m²...

—

== Comments on F-type Prisons ==
The European Committee for the Prevention of Torture (CPT) generally encouraged Turkey to move away from the system of dormitories towards the cell system found in F-type prisons. It also showed understanding for the security forces who raided 20 prisons (with 32 victims) and the forcible transfer of prisoners to the F-type prisons. In a report on 6 September 2006, the CPT reiterated that:

The CPT has never made any criticism of material conditions of detention in F-type prisons... however, the Committee has repeatedly stressed the need to develop communal activities for prisoners outside their living units. Unfortunately it is very clear from the information gathered in December 2005 that the situation in this regard remains highly unsatisfactory.

— CPT,

In the same report the CPT drew special attention to people sentenced to aggravated life imprisonment who, according to Article 25 of Law 5275, must be held in individual cells. The report stated inter alia:

The three F-type prisons visited in December 2005, were accommodating a small number of prisoners serving a sentence of aggravated life imprisonment. Their only out-of-cell activity, apart from a visit every 15 days and a fortnightly telephone call, was outdoor exercise in the courtyard adjoining their cell. The application of an isolation-type regime is a step that can have very harmful consequences for the prisoner concerned and can, in certain circumstances, lead to inhuman and degrading treatment. Beyond this, the CPT considers that the very philosophy underlying Article 25 of the Law on Execution of Sentences should be reconsidered.

In December 2007 and January 2008 the Association of Contemporary Jurist (Çağdaş Hukukçular Derneği or ÇHD) conducted research on the implementation of Decree 45/1. 25 lawyers went to six prisons and spoke with 120 prisoners. Afterwards they stated that the possibility of 10 hours of conversation per week in groups of 10 prisoners was not observed in the F-type prisons in Tekirdağ, Kocaeli, and Bolu. In Tekirdağ F-type Prison this right had been revoked three months prior. In Kandıra F-type Prison the time was limited to two and a half hours, as in Kocaeli F-type Prison and Edirne, where this right had been granted a month ago.

The Human Rights Association (HRA) and the Human Rights Foundation of Turkey (HRFT) also have criticized the isolation in F-type prisons. Details can be found in the HRA report on prisons in the Marmara region or the annual report 2007 (reports in Turkish). Since the English pages of the HRFT are under construction (as of August 2009), it is possible to search the website of the Democratic Turkey Forum (DTF, the German solidarity group of the HRFT), where a backup system for reports has existed since 2008.

Amnesty International (AI) has issued several reports raising concerns of isolation and atrocities in F-type prisons. In the Memorandum to the Turkish Government in January 2008, the chapter on F-type prisons stated inter alia:

Amnesty International has long held concerns regarding the “F-Type” prison regime, and in particular, harsh and arbitrary disciplinary punishments and isolation of prisoners. Amnesty International calls on the government to discontinue the use of solitary confinement and small-group isolation as a punishment for prisoners and to increase the hours of association in line with international standards.

In the document, AI's concerns in Europe and Central Asia are outlined (July-December 2006) the organization stated:

Six years on from the opening of the F-type prisons, serious complaints about the regime in these prisons continued... Prisoners, their lawyers and human rights groups continued to raise concerns about harsh and arbitrary disciplinary punishments meted out to prisoners in F-type prisons and reported treatment of prisoners which, in some cases, AI would consider as amounting to term cruel, inhuman and degrading

The New York based organization Human Rights Watch (HRW) has issued many reports related to F-type prisons before and after their implementation. On 5 April 2001 the report Small Group Isolation in F-type Prisons and the Violent Transfers of Prisoners to Sincan, Kandira, and Edirne Prisons was published. It discussed the background of the transfers of hunger strikers to F-type prisons and repeated earlier concerns such as:

Many prisoners also believe that they face a greater risk of ill-treatment by prison staff if they are transferred to a cell-based system, where there is only limited communication with other prisoners or with the outside world.

One year before on 24 May 2000, HRW published the report Small Group Isolation in Turkish Prisons: An Avoidable Disaster. The organization expressed two primary concerns:

(1) to the extent the cell-based system is accompanied by an isolation regime that provides prisoners with no access to educational or recreational activities or other sources of mental stimulation, the system may itself amount to ill-treatment, and (2) a regime of isolation that severely limits access to other inmates as well as the outside world may also increase the risk of ill-treatment of prisoners by prison staff.

== Locations ==
^{This section uses details from the German version on the subject}

On 19 July 2007, Kırıkkale F-type Prison was opened as the 13th F-type prison. The prison on the island İmralı where Abdullah Öcalan, leader of the Kurdish Workers' Party PKK, is the only inmate is not exactly an F-type prison (only nine instead of 368 inmates), but it is also a high security prison. Answering a parliamentarian's request, Justice Minister Sadullah Ergin stated in August 2009 that the reconstruction of the prison to a closed high security institution for the execution of sentences had been finished. He added that another eight prisoners would be taken there, but was unable to say who the prisoners would be.

Name (in Turkish)	Location	Website (Turkish)
Adana F Tipi Yüksek Güvenlikli Kapalı Ceza İnfaz Kurumu	Adana	http://www.adanafcik.adalet.gov.tr/
Ankara 1 No’lu F Tipi Yüksek Güvenlikli Kapalı Ceza İnfaz Kurumu	Ankara	http://www.ankaraf1.adalet.gov.tr/
Ankara 2 No’lu F Tipi Yüksek Güvenlikli Kapalı Ceza İnfaz Kurumu	Ankara	https://web.archive.org/web/20090314073621/http://www.ankaraf2.gov.tr/
Bolu F Tipi Yüksek Güvenlikli Kapalı Ceza İnfaz Kurumu	Bolu	http://www.bolufcik.adalet.gov.tr/
Edirne F Tipi Yüksek Güvenlikli Kapalı Ceza İnfaz Kurumu	Edirne	https://web.archive.org/web/20090910044447/http://www.edirne.adalet.gov.tr/ftipi.html
İzmir 1 No'lu F Tipi Yüksek Güvenlikli Kapalı Ceza İnfaz Kurumu	İzmir	http://www.izmirf1.adalet.gov.tr/
İzmir 2 No'lu F Tipi Yüksek Güvenlikli Kapalı Ceza İnfaz Kurumu	İzmir	http://www.izmirf2.adalet.gov.tr/
Kırıkkale F Tipi Yüksek Güvenlikli Kapalı Ceza İnfaz Kurumu	Kırıkkale	http://www.kirikkalefcik.adalet.gov.tr/ (under construction)
Kocaeli 1 No’lu F Tipi Yüksek Güvenlikli Kapalı Ceza İnfaz Kurumu	Kandıra / Kocaeli	http://www.kocaelif1.adalet.gov.tr/
Kocaeli 2 No’lu F Tipi Yüksek Güvenlikli Kapalı Ceza İnfaz Kurumu	Kandıra / Kocaeli	http://www.kocaelif2.adalet.gov.tr/ (under construction)
Tekirdağ 1 No’lu F Tipi Yüksek Güvenlikli Kapalı Ceza İnfaz Kurumu	Tekirdağ	no website yet
Tekirdağ 2 No’lu F Tipi Yüksek Güvenlikli Kapalı Ceza İnfaz Kurumu	Tekirdağ	https://web.archive.org/web/20090312093248/http://www.tekirdag2fkapalicik.gov.tr/index.html
Van F Tipi Yüksek Güvenlikli Kapalı Ceza İnfaz Kurumu	Van	http://www.vanfcik.adalet.gov.tr/
