= OHAL region =

Regional Governorship under State of Emergency in Turkey

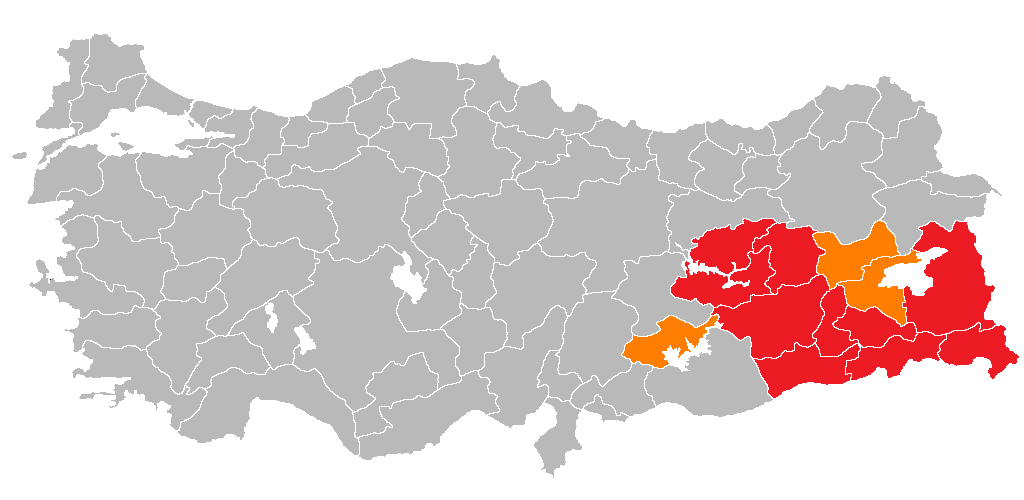
Red: OHAL provinces, orange: neighbouring provinces, 1987–2002, largest extent of OHAL

The OHAL region (Turkish: Olağanüstü Hâl Bölge Valiliği, lit. 'Governorship of Region in State of Emergency') was a "super-region" created in Turkey under state of emergency legislation, as part of its approach to the Kurdish–Turkish conflict. From 1994 onwards the scope of the OHAL super-region was gradually narrowed, with provinces being downgraded to "neighbouring province" and then removed from OHAL altogether. The state of emergency was extended 46 times, for four months each time. OHAL was finally discontinued on 30 November 2002.

== Extension from 1987 - 1990 ==
A new era started with the declaration of a region under emergency legislation in the provinces of Bingöl, Diyarbakır, Elazığ, Hakkari, Mardin, Siirt, Tunceli and Van and the declaration of Adıyaman, Bitlis and Muş provinces as neighbouring provinces (Mücavir İl) on 19 July 1987. The legal basis was Cabinet Decree 285 (285 sayılı Kanun Hükmünde Kararname) that appointed a regional governor for the state of emergency. The region became known as the OHAL Region (also called the State of Emergency Region, the Emergency Region Governorate, the Emergency Rule Region etc.).

== Extension from 1990 - 2002 ==
In 1990, the newly created Batman Province and Şırnak Provinces became part of the OHAL region. In 1994, Bitlis Province became a neighboring province. From the end of 1994, the region was slowly decreased. Firstly Elazığ Province was excluded under emergency legislation, then Adıyaman was no longer counted as a neighbouring province. In 1996 Mardin was "downgraded" to a neighbouring province. The same happened to Batman, Bingöl Province and Bitlis provinces in 1997. Emergency legislation was lifted in Siirt Province on 30 November 1999, in Van Province on 30 July 2000 and in Hakkari Province and Tunceli Provinces on 30 July 2002. On 30 November 2002, OHAL status was lifted completely. Emergency legislation was in force in Diyarbakır Province and Şırnak Provinces until the very end of OHAL.

== Powers given to the regional governor ==
In 1987 the governor was invested with the power to relocate and evacuate whole settlements, villages or hamlets. In April 1990, Decree 413 was issued which allowed the regional governor to ban, confiscate or fine publications, shut down printing plants, control all workers union activities, require prosecutors to open legal processes who violate decree 413, evacuate villages without a notice issued in advance, relocate harmful state employees and send to exile people to other parts in Turkey. In December 1990, with the Decree No. 430 he received authority over the provincial governors and was enabled to coordinate actions between them as well the right to exile people from the area he governed. With the same decree the regional governor and the provincial governors were issued with an immunity against any legal prosecution in connections with actions they made due to the powers they received with the Decree No. 430. In the OHAL region journalists were not granted access.

== List of governors ==
The regional governors (also called "super governors") were:

- Hayri Kozakçıoğlu (January 12, 1987 – August 2, 1991)
- Necati Çetinkaya (August 17, 1991 – January 29, 1992)
- Ünal Erkan (February 21, 1992 – November 1, 1995)
- Necati Bilican (1995–1997)
- Aydın Arslan (1997–1999; died on duty because of a heart attack in 1999)
- Gökhan Aydıner (1999–2002)

== Aftermath ==
Since 2002 the Turkish Armed Forces have declared parts of the former OHAL region as security zone (güvenlik bölgesi). Some people argued that this was another form of the OHAL regime.

=== Balance sheet of 15 years OHAL ===
In an article of September 2005 the lawyers Sezgin Tanrıkulu and Serdar Yavuz (both working in Diyarbakır) presented some figures concerning human rights violations in the region under emergency legislation (OHAL) between 1987 and 2002. These are official figures, since they were given in reply to a request of Diyarbakır deputy Mesut Değer of 29 January 2003 to the Defence Ministry. The response dates 28 February 2003.

The death toll was given as:

Civilians	Security staff	Militants
5,105	3,541	25,344

In addition 371 members of the armed forces and 572 civilians lost their lives because of exploding mines or bombs. In the region 1,248 political killings had happened. Among them 750 had been solved, while in 421 cases the murderers had not been identified. Eighteen people had died in police custody and 194 people suspiciously "disappeared". Some were later found prison, but 132 were still missing. There had been 1,275 complaints of torture and in 1,177 investigations had been initiated. In 296 trials against civil servants 60 had resulted in conviction, while in 56 of them the sentences had been suspended.

== 2016 state of emergency ==
Turkish President Recep Tayyip Erdoğan declared a three-month state of emergency (OHAL) in Turkey after the 2016 Turkish coup d'état attempt. It was repeatedly renewed for further three-month periods before being permanently lifted in July 2018.

== See also ==
- Inspectorates-General
- Martial law and state of emergency in Turkey
- Saturday Mothers
