= List of chiefs of the General Directorate of Security (Turkey) =

This list covers the chiefs of the General Directorate of Security (Turkish National Police) since 1923.

#	Chief	Begin	End
1	İsmail Hamit Oktay	24 October 1923	6 February 1924
2	Muhittin Üstündağ	23 February 1924	29 June 1925
3	Rıfat Danışman	21 September 1925	5 August 1930
4	Tevfik Hadi Baysal	5 August 1930	17 July 1934
5	Şükrü Sökmen Süer	20 September 1934	17 July 1939
6	Ali Rıza Çevik	17 July 1939	11 July 1941
7	Osman Nüri Adal	11 July 1941	3 August 1946
8	Haluk Nihat Pepeyi	13 November 1946	7 July 1947
9	Ahmet Demir	22 August 1947	15 November 1947
10	Gafur Soylu	15 November 1947	16 June 1950
11	Ferruh Şahinbaş	20 June 1950	21 September 1950
12	Servet Sürenkök	21 September 1950	25 January 1952
13	Kemal Aygün	31 January 1952	1 June 1954
14	Ethem Yetkiner	5 June 1954	12 September 1955
15	Kemal Aygün	12 September 1955	9 October 1957
16	Cemal Göktan	9 October 1957	17 May 1960
17	Necip San	2 June 1960	5 January 1961
18	İhsan Aras	17 April 1961	16 July 1963
19	Ahmet Demir	16 July 1963	3 December 1965
20	Hayrettin Nakipoğlu	3 December 1965	15 October 1969
21	Ömer Naci Bozkurt	20 May 1970	28 April 1971
22	E.Sedat Kirtetepe	28 April 1971	18 Jan 1972
23	Orhan Alaeddin Erbuğ	18 January 1972	22 June 1974
24	Celalettin Tüfekçi	13 August 1974	25 February 1976
25	Metin Dirimtekin	9 April 1976	3 October 1977
26	Vecdi Gönül	22 October 1977	22 February 1978
27	Gürbüz Atabek	22 February 1978	6 June 1978
28	Ali Haydar Özkın	19 July 1978	3 December 1979
29	Refet Küçüktiryaki	3 December 1979	11 April 1980
30	İsmail Dokuzoğlu	11 April 1980	12 September 1980
31	Hayrettin Tolunay	12 September 1980	2 January 1981
32	Fahri Görgülü	2 January 1981	19 April 1984
33	Saffet Arıkan Bedük	19 April 1984	14 January 1988
34	Sabahattin Çakmakoğlu	14 January 1988	11 April 1990
35	Necati Bilican	16 April 1990	9 July 1991
36	Ünal Erkan	9 July 1991	18 February 1992
37	Yılmaz Ergün	18 February 1992	10 July 1993
38	Mehmet Ağar	10 July 1993	31 October 1995
39	Alaaddin Yüksel	12 April 1996	26 May 1997
40	Kemal Çelik	26 May 1997	1 August 1997
41	Necati Bilican	1 August 1997	11 June 1998
42	Necati Bilican	18 July 1998	9 June 1999
43	Turan Genç	12 June 1999	13 June 2001
44	İbrahim Kemal Önal	21 June 2001	31 January 2003
45	Gökhan Aydıner	1 February 2003	5 December 2006
46	Oğuz Kağan Köksal	12 March 2007	10 March 2011
47	Mehmet Kılıçlar	11 August 2011	22 September 2014
48	Mehmet Celalettin Lekesiz	22 September 2014	10 September 2016
49	Selami Altınok	10 September 2016	26 April 2018
50	Celal Uzunkaya	25 July 2018	20 July 2019
51	Mehmet Aktaş	20 July 2019	22 June 2023
52	Erol Ayyıldız	27 June 2023	Incumbent
