= Governor of Denizli =

Governor of a Turkish Province

Governor of Denizli Denizli Valiliği
- Logo of the Governor of Denizli
- Incumbent; Yavuz Selim Köşger since January 19, 2026
- Appointer: President of Turkey; On the recommendation of the Turkish government
- Term length: No set term length or limit
- Inaugural holder: Muhittin Paşa; August 19, 1910
- Website: Office of the Governor

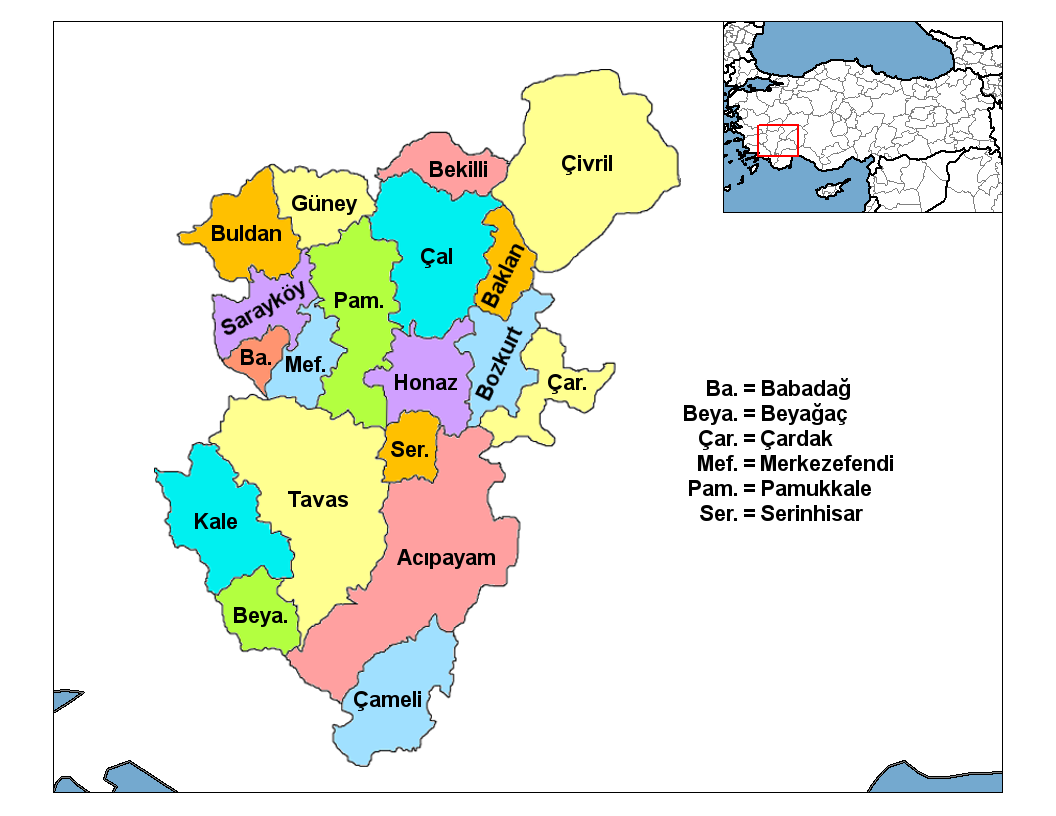
Map of the Province of Denizli, showing the provincial districts.

The governor of Denizli (Turkish: Denizli Valiliği) is the bureaucratic state official responsible for both national government and state affairs in the Province of Denizli. Similar to the governorsof the 80 other provinces of Turkey, the governor of Denizli is appointed by the government of Turkey and is responsible for the implementation of government legislation within Denizli. The governor is also the most senior commander of both the Denizli provincial police force and the Denizli Gendarmerie.

== Appointment ==
The governor of Denizli is appointed by the president of Turkey, who confirms the appointment after recommendation from the Turkish government. The Ministry of the Interior first considers and puts forward possible candidates for approval by the cabinet. The governor of Denizli is therefore not a directly elected position and instead functions as the most senior civil servant in the Province of Denizli.

=== Term limits ===
The governor is not limited by any term limits and does not serve for a set length of time. Instead, the governor serves at the pleasure of the government, which can appoint or reposition the governor whenever it sees fit. Such decisions are again made by the cabinet of Turkey. The governor of Denizli, as a civil servant, may not have any close connections or prior experience in Denizli Province. It is not unusual for governors to alternate between several different provinces during their bureaucratic career.

== Functions ==
The governor of Denizli has both bureaucratic functions and influence over local government. The main role of the governor is to oversee the implementation of decisions by government ministries, constitutional requirements and legislation passed by the Grand National Assembly within the provincial borders. The governor also has the power to reassign, remove or appoint officials a certain number of public offices and has the right to alter the role of certain public institutions if they see fit. Governors are also the most senior public official within the province, meaning that they preside over any public ceremonies or provincial celebrations being held due to a national holiday. As the commander of the provincial police and Gendarmerie forces, the governor can also take decisions designed to limit civil disobedience and preserve public order. Although mayors of municipalities and councillors are elected during local elections, the governor has the right to re-organise or to inspect the proceedings of local government despite being an unelected position.

== List of governors of Denizli ==
Governors of Denizli
No.	Name	Took office	Left office
1	Muhittin Paşa	19 August 1910	29 August 1912
2	Hikmet Bey	09 September 1912	27 June 1913
3	Haydar Bey	08 July 1913	25 August 1913
4	Ismail Fevzi Paşa	19 September 1913	11 March 1915
5	Tevfik Bey	26 March 1915	05. November 1918
6	Faik Bey	1918	19 May 1920
7	Ali Riza Bey	19. December 1920	20 April 1922
8	Bayram Fehmi Bey	23 April 1922	04 September 1922
9	Cemal Bardakçi	05. October 1922	27 May 1925
10	Mithat Kalabalik	19 July 1925	11 August 1927
11	Halit Aksoy	11 August 1927	18 July 1932
12	Fuat Tuksal	18 July 1932	26 June 1935
13	Ekrem Ergür	17 August 1935	15 April 1940
14	O. Nuri Tekeli	25 May 1940	12 January 1944
15	Cevat Ökmen	10 February 1944	15 February 1946
16	Hüdai Karatekin	09 March 1946	08 September 1947
17	Ahmet Demir	29. November 1947	16 June 1950
18	Hifzi Ege	29 June 1950	07 February 1952
19	Şevket Bulgu	30 April 1952	27 February 1953
20	Fethi Tansuk	02 May 1953	03 August 1954
21	Cemil Keleşoğlu	25. December 1954	22. November 1955
22	Fazil Uybadin	30. November 1955	23 June 1956
23	Vefki Ertür	26 July 1956	25 May 1959
24	Vefik Kitapçigil	17 July 1959	14 June 1960
25	Ulvi Vural (Askeri Vali)	30 May 1960	14 June 1960
26	E. Talat Avşaroğlu	14 June 1960	17 June 1961
27	Lütfi Uraz	18 June 1961	23 June 1964
28	Nezih Okuş	30 June 1964	11 June 1967
29	Ziya Durakoğlu	12 June 1967	07 February 1970
30	Münir Güney	28 July 1970	23 July 1975
31	M. Hayri Güler	24 July 1975	03 September 1977
32	Sabahattin Savaci	03. October 1977	18 February 1978
33	M. Emin Dündar	18 February 1978	02 August 1979
34	Celal Kayacan	18 June 1979	07. December 1979
35	Musa Atik	09. December 1979	14 June 1980
36	A. Asim Iğneciler	17 June 1980	22 June 1981
37	Sami Sönmez	03 July 1981	10 February 1984
38	A. Rifat Kaplan	13 February 1984	01 June 1985
39	Necati Bilican	16 June 1985	15 April 1990
40	Alpaslan Karacan	24 May 1990	15 August 1991
41	M. Erdoğan Cebeci	19 August 1991	19 February 1992
42	Oğuz Kağan Köksal	24 February 1992	01. November 1995
43	Yusuf Ziya Göksu	17 April 1996	17 February 2003
44	Recep Yazicioğlu	20 February 2003	08 September 2003
45	Gazi Şimşek	27. October 2003	October October 2006
46	Dr. Hasan Canpolat	26. October 2006	16 May 2008
47	Yavuz Erkmen	18 May 2008	28 August 2011
48	Abdülkadir Demir	14 September 2011	19 September 2014
49	Şükrü Kocatepe	24 September 2014	14 June 2016
50	Ahmet Altıparmak	20 June 2016	3 July 2017
51	Hasan Karahan	5 July 2017	15 June 2020
52	Ali Fuat Atik	17 June 2020	13 August 2023
53	Ömer Faruk Coşkun	15 August 2023	19 January 2026
54	Yavuz Selim Köşger	19 January 2026	

== See also ==
- Governor (Turkey)
- Denizli Province
- Ministry of the Interior (Turkey)
