= Dursun Karataş =

Turkish politician (1952–2008)

- Born: 25 March 1952; Elazığ, Turkey
- Died: 11 August 2008 (aged 56); Arnhem, Netherlands
- Education: Istanbul University
- Years active: 1978–2008
- Organization: Revolutionary People's Liberation Party/Front
- Notable work: Haklıyız Kazanacağız
- Partner: Sabahat Karataş

Dursun Karataş (25 March 1952 — 11 August 2008) was a Turkish communist of Zaza Kurd descent. He commanded the revolutionary left and DHKP-C, a group considered to be a terrorist organization in Turkey, the European Union and the USA. The revolutionary left was closed in the 90s due to lack of personnel.

== Biography ==
Karataş founded Dev Sol ("Revolutionary Left", precursor of DHKP-C) in 1978, as an offshoot of the Dev Yol ("Revolutionary Way"). The group was based in Istanbul.

Karataş was jailed after the 1980 military coup. In prison a political reorganisation was undertaken. The Dev-Sol inmates at Bayrampaşa prison refused to follow orders and boycotted court invitations. In prison Karataş wrote "Haklıyız Kazanacağız" ("We Are Right, We Shall Prevail"); a work which included an analysis of the movement's mistakes, and a list of the organization's enemies. It was published in two volumes in 1989, spanning more than 1000 pages.

He escaped from the Bayrampasa prison in 1989 and fled to Western Europe. In 1989 to 1990, Dev Sol carried out a series of attacks. However, on 12 July 1991, Turkish police was able to dismantle several cells of the organization. In April 1992, his wife Sabahat was killed by the Turkish police.

Following the police crackdown on Dev-Sol, Karataş was kidnapped and detained by the second-in-command of the movement, Bedri Yağan, on 13 September 1993. Karataş did however escape from captivity, and Dev-Sol was divided. Karataş and his followers reorganized their movement as DHKP-C.

On 9 September 1994, he was arrested at the Franco-Italian border, and sentenced to four years in prison. In 2006 a Belgian court sentenced him in absentia.

The Ankara 9th administrative court ruled in February 2007 that Turkey should pay an YTL 1,000 compensation to Karataş, who was tried in absentia for 27 years, for membership in an outlawed organization and the unauthorized possession of guns and fake documents. The judges' decision stated that: "The Karataş trial process started at the Ordu Martial Law Court in 1981 and has not been concluded since then. We have decided that Turkey should pay compensation to Karataş for such a lengthy trial process."

== DHKP/C insurgency ==
The DHKP/C insurgency in Turkey refers to the Marxist–Leninist insurgency waged by the Revolutionary People's Liberation Party/Front (DHKP/C) against the Republic of Turkey, ongoing since 1990. The insurgency began with political assassinations in the early 1990s, and has escalated in the past few years with the use of suicide bombers.

DHKP/C added suicide bombings to its operations in 2001, with attacks against Turkish police in January and September of that year. On 10 September 2001, a suicide bomber killed himself and three other people in Istanbul, being the bloodiest attack perpetrated by the group.

Security operations in Turkey and elsewhere have weakened the group, however. DHKP-C did not conduct any major attacks in 2003, although a DHKP/C female suicide bomber Sengul Akkurt's explosive belt detonated by accident on 20 May 2003 in Ankara, in a restroom, while she was preparing for an action.

On 11 September 2012, a suicide bomber, a DHKP/C militant, blew himself up at the Sultangazi district in Istanbul killing himself, a Turkish National Police Officer. The Turkish National Police identified the bomber as İbrahim Çuhadar, a member of DHKP/C.

=== Death ===
Karataş died from cancer on 11 August 2008 in a hospital in the Netherlands. (Some sources initially reported him as having died in Belgium, however the spokesperson of the organization in Brussels, Bahar Kimyongür, said that Karataş' friends gathered to pay their respects in the Netherlands.) He lies in the Gazi Cemevi of Istanbul. 5,000 people attended his funeral procession.

== Footnotes ==
- ^¶ Some sources simply say 1953, without citing a specific date. His party-written obituary also lists his birth date as March 25, 1952, and his place of birth as the village of Kürdemlik (Cevizdere).
