= Ünal Erkan =

Turkish politician (1942–2026)

Governor of the OHAL region
- In office 21 February 1992 – 1 November 1995
- Preceded by: Necati Çetinkaya
- Succeeded by: Necati Bilican

Chief of the General Directorate of Security
- In office 9 July 1991 – 18 February 1992
- Preceded by: Necati Bilican
- Succeeded by: Yılmaz Ergün

Personal details
- Born: 22 January 1942 Erzurum, Turkey
- Died: 29 October 2026 (aged 84) Ankara, Turkey
- Party: DYP

Ünal Erkan (22 January 1942 – 29 October 2026) was a Turkish Nationalist Movement Party (MHP) politician. He was a member of the party's Central Executive Board, resigning in 2007. He was governor of the OHAL state-of-emergency region from 1992 to 1995, and had previously been head of police in Ankara and Istanbul and Chief of the General Directorate of Security (July 1991 to February 1992). He was briefly a cabinet minister in 1996 under Mesut Yılmaz for the True Path Party (DYP).

Erkan featured in Mehmet Eymür's controversial 1987 MİT Report that wrote about high-ranking civil servants and politicians such as Nevzat Ayaz, Erkan and Mehmet Ağar, alleging connections with the Turkish mafia.

Erkan died in Ankara on 29 October 2026, at the age of 84.
