= Gürbüz Atabek =

- Born: 13 August 1929; Arhavi, Artvin, Turkey
- Died: 7 February 2017 (aged 87); Istanbul
- Occupation(s): bureaucrat, governor and chief of the General Directorate of Security of Turkey

Gürbüz Atabek (13 August 1929, Arhavi, Artvin, Turkey — 7 February 2017, Istanbul) was a Turkish bureaucrat, governor and chief of the General Directorate of Security of Turkey from 22 February 1978 to 6 June 1978.

== Biography ==
Atabek graduated from Haydarpaşa High School in 1948. Following his graduation from the Ankara University Faculty of Political Sciences, he completed his internship at the Ankara Civil Servant Office, to which he was appointed on 18 July 1952. Atabek served as a Manavgat District Governor, Ankara Police Department 4th Branch Directorate, Istanbul Police Department 2nd, 8th Branch Directorate, Deputy Chief of Police, Teacher at Istanbul Etiler Police School, Police Department and manager at Izmir Police Department. He served as the General Director of Security between 22 February 1978 and 6 June 1978. After leaving his post as the Chief of Police, he was appointed as the central governor of Turkey.

== Books ==
- Tam otuz yıl : dile kolay, 2000 (Exactly thirty years: easy to say)
