= Bahar Kimyongür =

Belgian political writer

Bahar Kimyongür (born 28 April 1974 in Berchem-Sainte-Agathe, Belgium), is a Belgian political writer of Turkish extraction. He is perhaps most well known for his repeated arrests and releases on terrorism-related offences in the early twenty-first century.

== Legal tribulations ==
In 2006 he was convicted, as part of a group, by the tribunal of first instance for terrorist offences (specifically membership of the DHKP-C), and imprisoned. The conditions of their imprisonment in Bruges prison have been called a 'white torture' by Human rights groups. Although on release whilst appealing against his sentence, in November the same year the Ghent Court of Appeal upheld his conviction. Imprisoned in Ghent, Kimyongür appealed to the Supreme Court, and again, to the Antwerp appellate court a year later. Although delaying its verdict a number of times, the Antwerp court eventually announced the acquittal of all the accused on 7 February 2008. A year later, the Brussels appeals' court also acquitted him of further charges relating to membership of a proscribed organisation. However, it was not until early in 2010 that the Prosecution of Belgium announced it would not appeal Kimyongür's (and others) release. The television channel RTBF has claimed that his arrest in the Netherlands was at the instigation of the Belgian security services. He was subsequently arrested in Córdoba, Spain on 18 June 2013, and released under caution; he was then arrested in Bergamo, Italy, on 21 November the same year. He was released in March 2014 by the Brescia court of appeal.
