= Berchem-Sainte-Agathe =

Municipality of the Brussels-Capital Region, Belgium

Berchem-Sainte-Agathe: Berchem-Sainte-Agathe (French); Sint-Agatha-Berchem (Dutch)
- Municipality
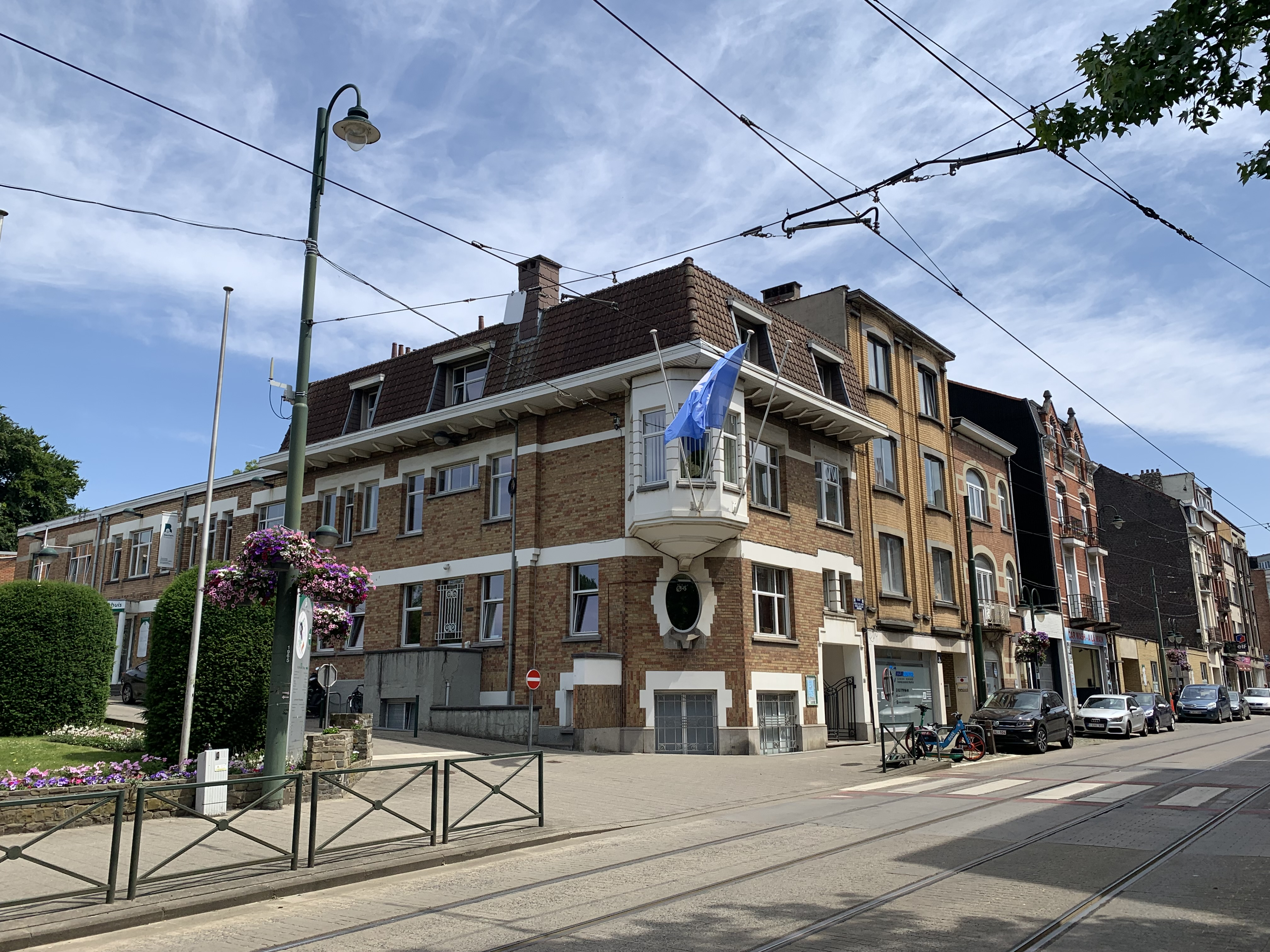
- Berchem-Sainte-Agathe's Municipal Hall

- Flag Coat of arms

- Berchem-Sainte-Agathe municipality in the Brussels-Capital Region
- Interactive map of Berchem-Sainte-Agathe
- Location in Belgium
- Coordinates: 50°52′N 04°18′E
- Country: Belgium
- Community: Flemish Community; French Community
- Region: Brussels-Capital
- Arrondissement: Brussels-Capital

Government
  - Mayor: Christian Lamouline (LE)
  - Governing party: LB + PS/Vooruit+ + Ecolo/Groen

Area
  - Total: 2.95 km^{2} (1.14 sq mi)

Population (2020-01-01)
  - Total: 25,502
  - Density: 8,640/km^{2} (22,400/sq mi)
- Postal codes: 1082
- NIS code: 21003
- Area codes: 02
- Website: berchem.brussels/fr (in French) berchem.brussels/nl (in Dutch)

Berchem-Sainte-Agathe (French, pronounced [bɛʁkɛm sɛ̃t aɡat]) or Sint-Agatha-Berchem (Dutch, pronounced [sɪnt aːˈɣaːtaː ˈbɛrxɛm]), often simply called Berchem, is one of the 19 municipalities of the Brussels-Capital Region, Belgium. Located in the north-western part of the region, it is bordered by Ganshoren, Koekelberg, and Molenbeek-Saint-Jean, as well as the Flemish municipalities of Asse and Dilbeek. Like all municipalities in Brussels, it is officially bilingual (French–Dutch).

As of 1 January 2024, the municipality had a population of 25,787 inhabitants. The total area is 2.95 km^{2} (1.14 sq mi), which gives a population density of 8,741/km^{2} (22,640/sq mi). The municipality is known for its calm and peaceful character. It is said that Berchem is a "village in the city".

== History ==
In the Middle Ages, Berchem-Sainte-Agathe was a modest village on the edge of Brussels. In 1795, the parish received municipal status. In 1841, the neighbouring settlement of Koekelberg within the municipality was separated and made its own municipality. In 1954, Berchem-Sainte-Agathe was redesignated from a monolingual Dutch-speaking municipality to a bilingual one, placing it within Brussels' bilingual language area. This designation was the basis for the municipality's inclusion in the Brussels Agglomeration in 1971, which was succeeded by the Brussels-Capital Region in 1989.

== Main sights ==
Berchem-Sainte-Agathe has a rich cultural and architectural heritage. Some of the main points of interest include:

- The former Church of St. Agatha, an old 12th-century Romanesque church. Completely renovated from 1972 to 1974, it is now deconsecrated and used for cultural ceremonies and celebrations.
- The Villa Marie-Mirande, an early 20th-century (1912) Art Nouveau town house designed by the architect Victor Tinant.
- The main pavilion of the former French Hospital, designed in neoclassical style by the architect Gustave Maukels and completed in 1928–29.
- The Cité Moderne, a housing project designed and built from 1922 to 1924 by the modernist architect Victor Bourgeois.
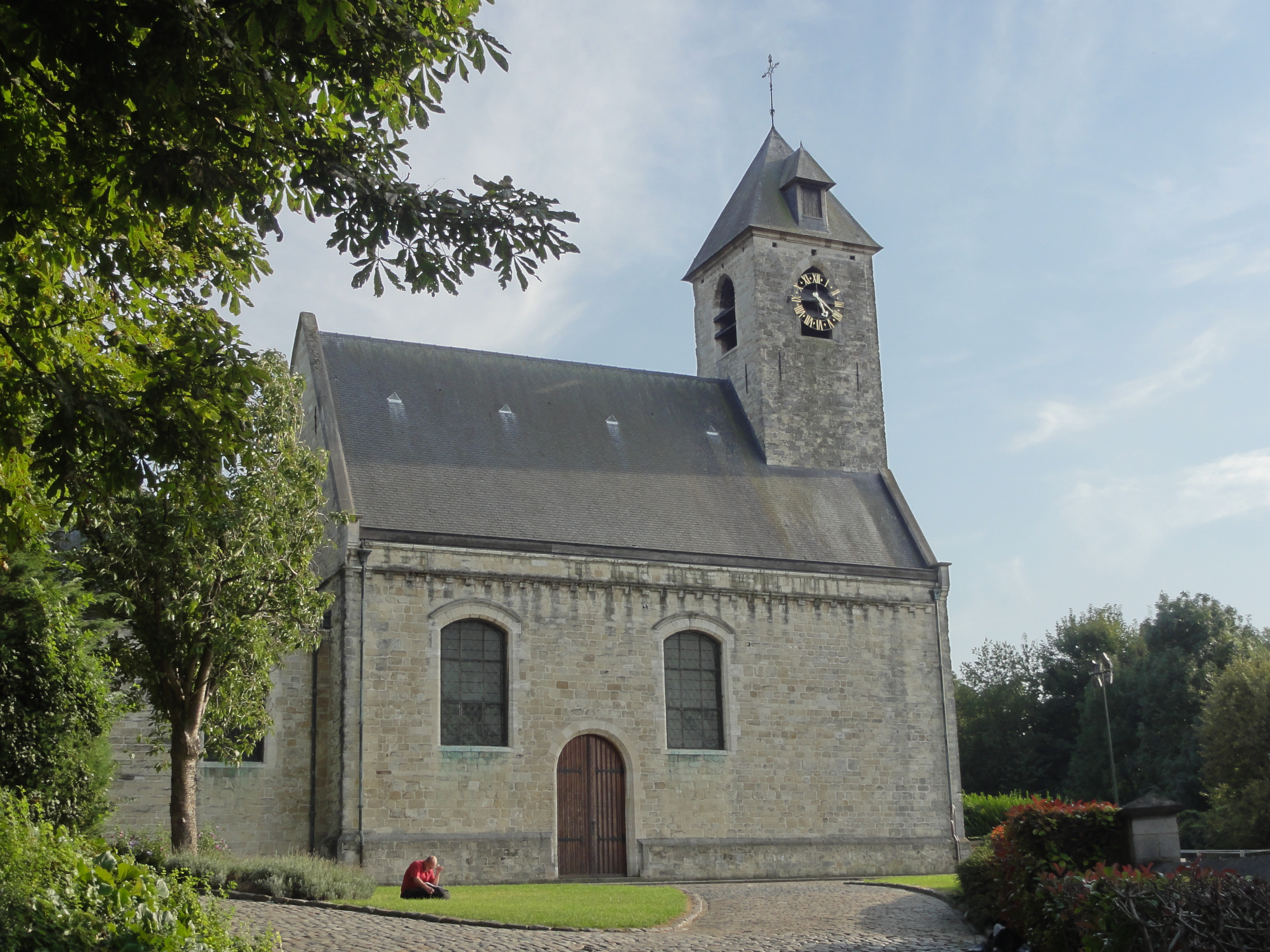
Former Church of St. Agatha

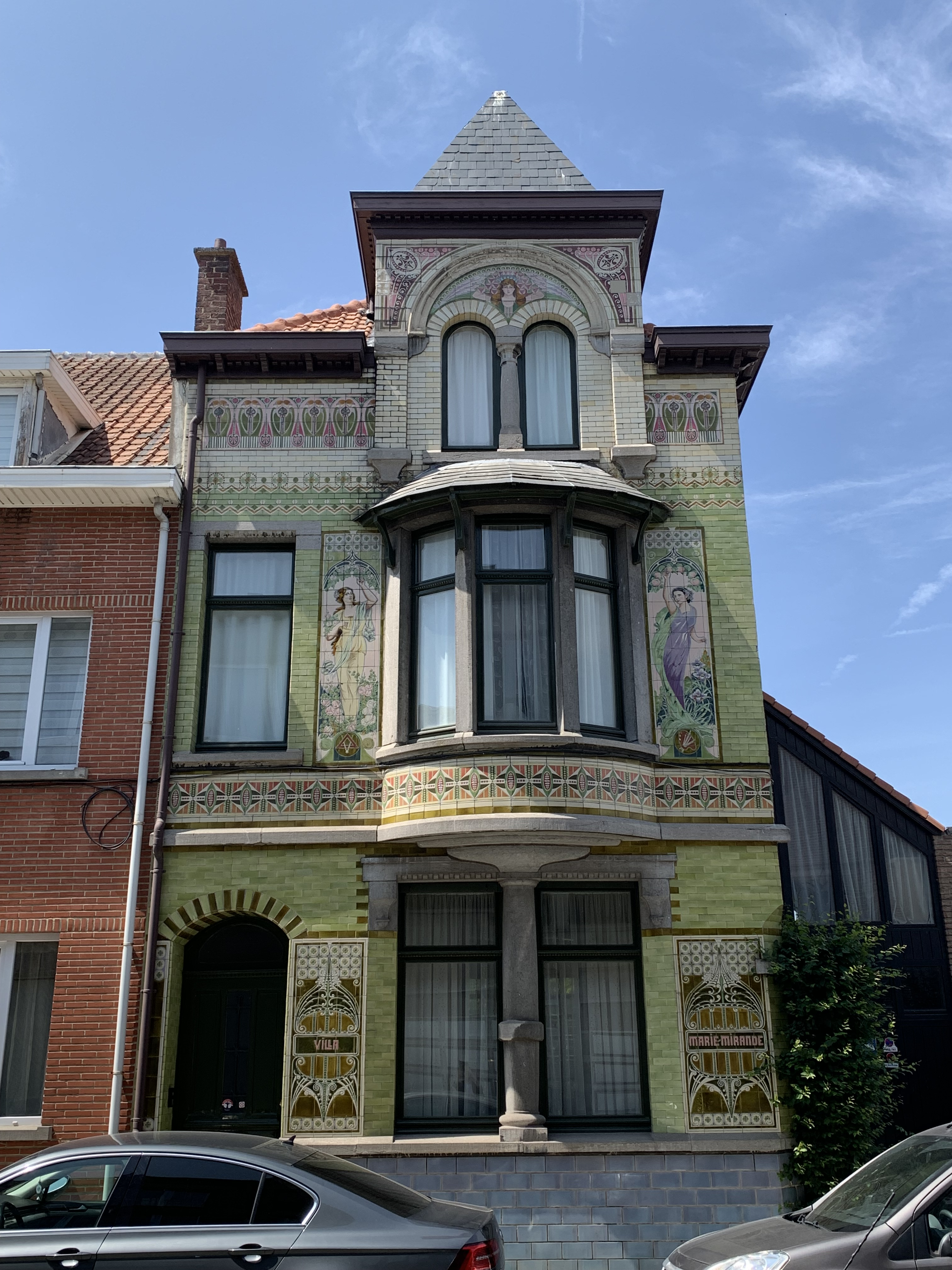
Villa Marie-Mirande

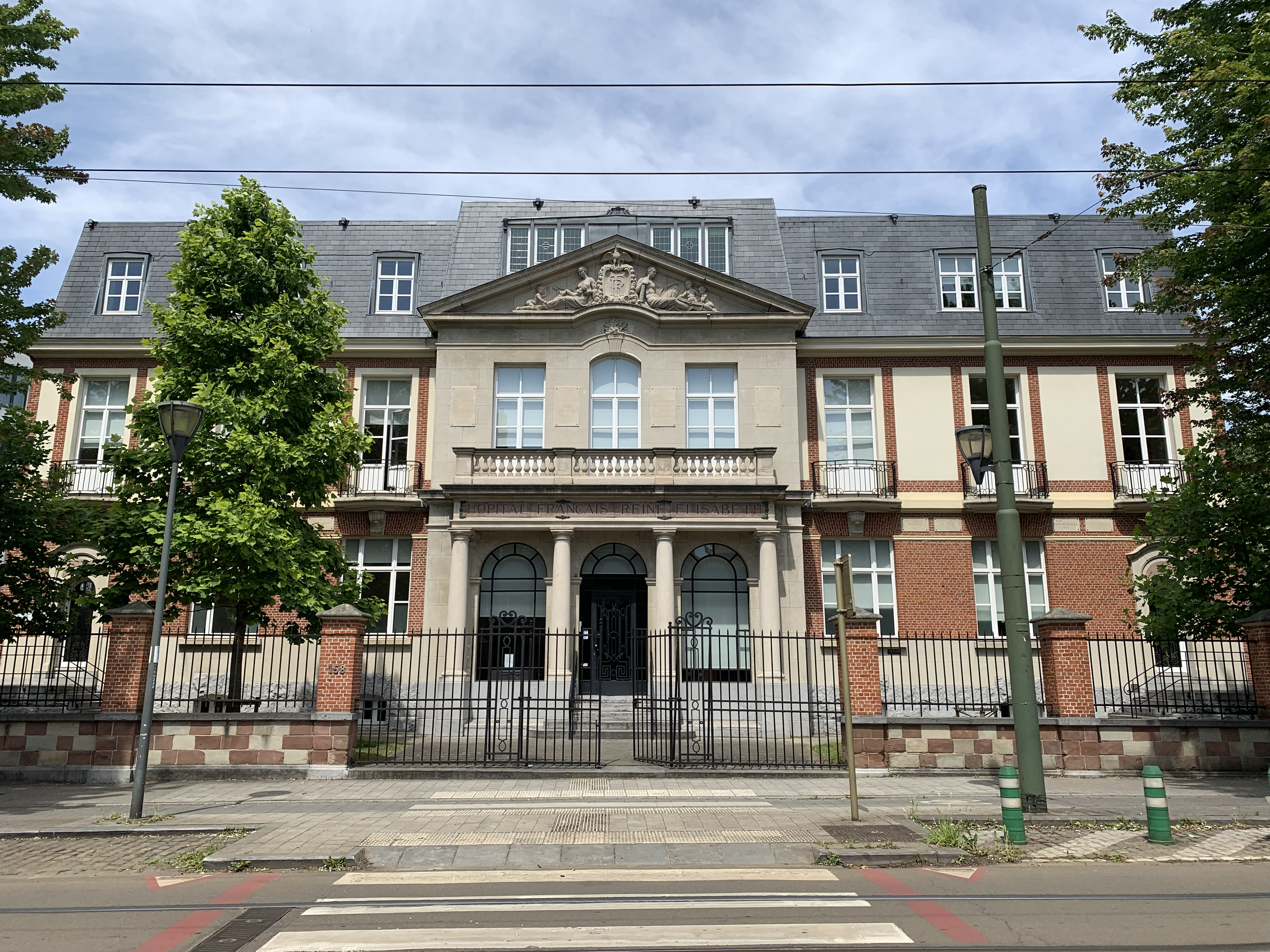
French Hospital

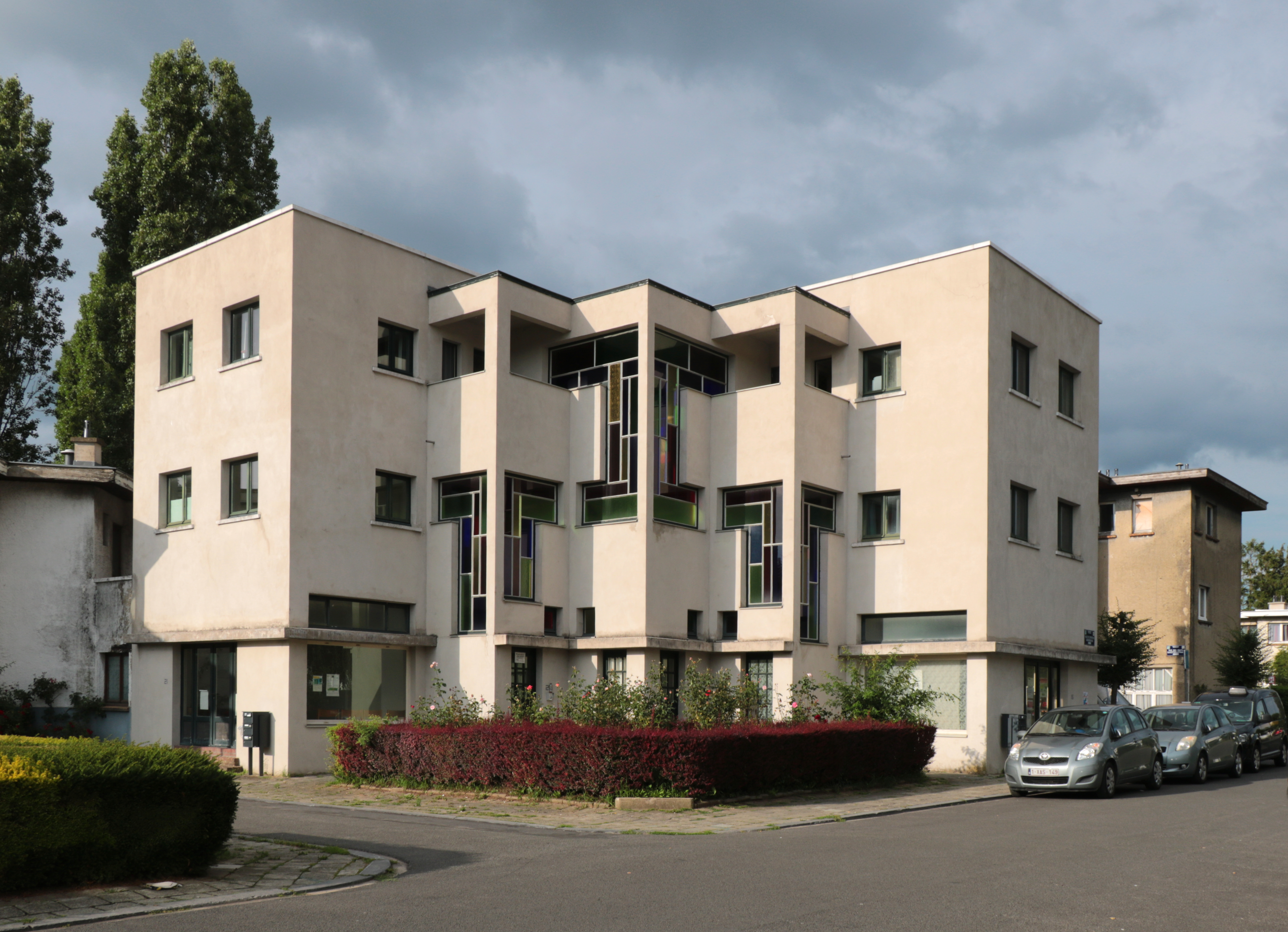
Cité Moderne

== Notable inhabitants ==
- Bahar Kimyongür (born 1974), writer and activist
- David Lachterman (1934–1992), radio and television comedian and commentary expert
- Alexis Saelemaekers (born 1999), football player who has played as a winger for RSC Anderlecht and AC Milan
- Françoise Schepmans (born 1960), politician and mayor of Molenbeek, was born there.
- Jean-Claude Van Damme (born 1960), actor and martial artist, was born there.
- Philippe Van Parijs (born 1951), political philosopher and political economist, was born there.
- Rudi Vervoort (born 1958), politician and Minister-President of the Brussels-Capital Region, was born there.
