= Demir Sabancı =

Turkish entrepreneur and philanthropist (born 1971)

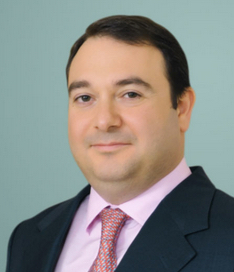
- Born: 1971 (age 54–55)
- Education: BA, MBA
- Alma mater: Boston University
- Occupation: Chairman of Sedes Holding
- Spouse: Aslıhan Koruyan Sabancı
- Children: 3
- Parent(s): Özdemir Sabancı; Sevda Sabancı

Demir Sabancı (Turkish pronunciation: [deˈmiɾ saˈbaːndʒɯ]; born 1971) is a Turkish entrepreneur, venture capitalist, and philanthropist. He is the chairman of Sedes Holding and its subsidiaries. His businesses range from the largest personal care market chain in Turkey, to real estate management and development in New York City.

Sabancı is a third generation member of the Sabancı family. Born in 1971 he is a grandson of Haci Omer Sabancı and the only son of Özdemir Sabancı, who was murdered by a terrorist attack in 1996 at the headquarters of Sabancı Holding in Istanbul, Turkey.

== Business ==
Demir Sabancı started his business career in Japan and quickly rose to the executive ranks. He began at Toyota City in 1993 working in various executive positions with Mitsui & Co. and Toyota Motor Corporation. He left Japan and moved to the United States to help lead Toyota Motor Sales.

After leaving Toyota, Sabancı rose through the corporate ranks at a number of companies. In 1996, he joined Sabancı Holding as a board member and three years later, founded Teknosa, the pioneer electronics retail chain in Turkey. Between 1999 and 2004, Sabancı held various executive positions in Sabancı Holdings while serving as the president of the Retail Strategic Business Unit that is composed of Carrefoursa, Diasa, and Teknosa. Between 2000 and 2004, he served as founding shareholder and first General Manager and Chairman of Teknosa.

As an entrepreneur and venture capitalist, Sabancı founded and co-founded several companies in Turkey. He is also a founding shareholder and board member of Odesa, Döysa VIP Aviation, and Gratis. On April 9, 2002, Sabancı launched the company Sedes Holding, a Turkish-based firm that specializes in helping launch new business through venture capital; investment management; and real estate investment. He is currently the president and chairman of the board. He also created Sedes Insurance Brokerage and Reinsurance as an additional venture under Sedes Holding.

== Education ==
Sabancı holds a double major in Economics and International Relations from Boston University. He holds two Masters of Business degrees, one from Cornell University's Johnson Graduate School of Management and the other from Carnegie Mellon University in Global Business Administration.

== Philanthropy and community ==
Sabancı is an active philanthropist with organizations such as the Turkish Health & Education Foundation (SEV).

Sabancı is also an Advisory Council Member of Cornell University’s Johnson Business School.
