= Hulusi Sayın =

Personal details
- Born: 28 April 1926 Elazığ, Turkey
- Died: 30 January 1991 (aged 64) Ankara, Turkey

Military service
- Allegiance: Turkey
- Branch/service: Turkish Army
- Years of service: 1945–1989
- Rank: Lt-General

Hulusi Sayın (28 April 1926 – 30 January 1991) was a general in the Turkish Gendarmerie, and may have been involved with the Gendarmerie's JITEM intelligence unit. He retired in 1989 and become an adviser to the Prime Minister's office. He was assassinated outside his home in January 1991; the assassination was claimed by Dev Sol, a leftist organization. At the time of his death Sayın was known to be advocating a peaceful solution to the Kurdish–Turkish conflict.

Sayın graduated from the Turkish Military Academy in 1948 and the Turkish Military College in 1964.

A high school in his home town is named for him.
