= 2015 Istanbul suicide bombing =

Terrorist incident in Turkey

- Location: (Turkey) Sultanahmet, Fatih, Istanbul
- Date: 6 January 2015
- Target: Police station
- Attack type: Suicide bombing
- Deaths: 2 (including the perpetrator)
- Injuries: 1
- Perpetrator: Islamic State (ISIL)
- Assailant: Diana Ramazova

On 6 January 2015, Diana Ramazova from Dagestan detonated a bomb vest at a police station in Istanbul's central Sultanahmet district, near the Blue Mosque and Hagia Sophia. The attack killed Ramazova and injured two police officers, one of whom later succumbed to his wounds. Ramazova was the pregnant widow of a Norwegian-Chechen ISIS fighter in Syria who had been killed in December 2014.

== Attack ==
Istanbul governor Vasip Sahin said the woman, who reportedly spoke English with "a thick accent" and was dressed in a niqab, entered the police station and told officers she had lost her wallet before detonating the bomb. Turkish Prime Minister Ahmet Davutoğlu told reporters that the bomber was carrying two other devices, which were safely defused by officers on the scene. Emergency services rushed to the blast site, while the tram line that runs through the district was temporarily suspended. Besides the perpetrator only one other person died in the attack; a young police officer from Trabzon who had just become a father.

== Perpetrator ==
Six people, including three foreigners, were detained over the attack.

On January 7, the far-left armed group Revolutionary People's Liberation Party–Front (DHKP/C) claimed responsibility for the attack, saying it was meant "to punish (the) murderers of Berkin Elvan" and "to call to account the fascist state that protects AKP's corrupt, stealing ministers". Berkin Elvan was a 15-year-old boy who was killed by a tear-gas canister fired by a police officer during the 2013 Istanbul protests. The bombing came five days after another member of DHKP/C attacked police on guard outside the Ottoman-era Dolmabahçe Palace, hurling two grenades that failed to explode. The building houses the Istanbul offices of the Turkish prime minister.

The DHKP/C had been involved in several deadly attacks on Turkish government targets in recent years, including a 2013 suicide bombing at the US embassy in Ankara.

The group also claimed that the suicide bomber was Elif Sultan Kalsen. After being called to a criminal medical center to identify the body, Kalsen's family denied the claims, stating that it was not their daughter.

On January 8, 2015, the perpetrator was identified as Diana Ramazova, a Chechen-Russian citizen from Dagestan. She had married Abu Aluevitsj Edelbijev, a Norwegian citizen of Chechen origin in 2014. They spent three months in Istanbul from May to July 2014, before entering Syria. In Syria Edelbijev fought for ISIS and was killed in December. Ramazova, who was pregnant at the time, irregularly reentered Turkey shortly after his death.

== See also ==
- 2013 United States embassy bombing in Ankara
- January 2016 Istanbul bombing
