= İsmail Selen =

Turkish general

Grave

İsmail Selen (1931, Bolu – 23 May 1991, Ankara) was a retired general in the Turkish Gendarmerie. He was assassinated in 1991. DHKP/C member Necmi Suma was sentenced to 12 years for his murder. In 2011 Col. Arif Doğan claimed that the Turkish Gendarmerie's Cem Ersever had ordered Selen's assassination.

Selen graduated from the Turkish Military Academy in 1954 and the Turkish Military College in 1970. He was promoted to Brigadier-General in 1980 and to Major-General in 1984, becoming Chief of Staff of the Gendarmerie General Command in 1985. He retired at his own request on 15 July 1989.
