= Fehriye Erdal =

Turkish politician (born 1977)

- Born: 25 February 1977; Adana, Turkey
- Organization: DHKP-C

Fehriye Erdal (born 25 February 1977) is a Revolutionary People's Liberation Party/Front militant. She was one of the three DHKP-C members involved in the assassination of Turkish businessman Özdemir Sabancı and two of his employees on 9 January 1996 in Istanbul, Turkey. In 2008, however, she was acquitted of this charge. In 2017 she was found guilty of involvement in the same murders in Turkey by a Belgian court.

In 1999, she was captured in Belgium. At the time of her arrest, she held a fake passport under the name Nese Yildirim. Belgian officials were able to identify her only after her fingerprints were taken.

In 2006, a couple of hours before her sentence was announced and in spite of being under 24-hour surveillance of the Belgian Secret Service, she managed to flee. She was to be sentenced to a four-year imprisonment in Belgium for the crimes she had committed in that country. She would later be handed over to Turkey to be tried for her involvement in terrorist activities within the Turkish Republic.

After her escape, Interpol issued a red warrant for Erdal, sending a message to its 186 member countries that she was to be captured and returned to Belgium. Although there have been reports that she has been seen in Cyprus and Jordan, there was no solid information on her whereabouts.

In 2008, the Belgian court of appeal acquitted Erdal of all charges against her. The court ruled there was no evidence connecting Erdal with terrorist activities. In 2017 she was sentenced in absentia to 15 years in prison by a Belgian court. In 2019, the Belgian authorities declared that they were still looking for Erdal.
