= Özdemir Sabancı =

Turkish businessperson (1941–1996)

- Born: May 15, 1941; Adana, Turkey
- Died: January 9, 1996 (aged 54); Istanbul, Turkey
- Cause of death: Murdered
- Resting place: Adana Asri Cemetery
- Education: Chemical engineering
- Alma mater: University of Manchester Institute of Science and Technology
- Organization: Sabancı Holding
- Spouse: Sevda (Girişken) Sabancı
- Children: 2, including Demir
- Parent(s): Hacı Ömer Sabancı; Sadıka Sabancı

Özdemir Sabancı (May 15, 1941 – January 9, 1996) was a Turkish businessman and a second generation member of the Sabancı family.

== Biography ==
He was born in Adana, Turkey. After finishing high school at the Tarsus American College in Tarsus, province Mersin, he received his B.A. degree in chemical engineering from the University of Manchester Institute of Science and Technology (UMIST), UK. Later, he obtained a master's degree in the same discipline in Switzerland.

Returning to Turkey, he worked in the Sabancı Holding and soon founded and further developed the synthetic fibres producer Sasa, one of the biggest industrial companies of the group. Under his leadership, Sabancı Holding entered into the automotive sector. He established several joint-venture projects with major Japanese companies including production of Mitsubishi coaches and trucks, Komatsu construction equipment, loaders and forklifts. In 1990, he paved the way to produce Toyota cars in Turkey as a consequence of the largest Turkish-Japanese partnership.

In the board of directors of the holding, he was responsible for the Group of Synthetic Fibers, Automotive and Plastics.

Özdemir Sabancı was gunned down on January 9, 1996, in his office in the strongly guarded Sabancı Towers in Levent, Istanbul, along with the general manager of ToyotaSA and a secretary, by assassins hired by the leftist armed group DHKP-C. They had been given access to the building by Fehriye Erdal, a female member of DHKP-C, who was an employee at that time. Recently released information has suggested that the assassination of Özdemir Sabancı's assassin Mustafa Duyar was planned by retired general Veli Küçük, who was detained in the Ergenekon investigation.

Özdemir Sabancı was buried at the Adana Asri Cemetery. He was survived by his wife Sevda, their son Demir and daughter Serra (1975).

== See also ==
- List of assassinated people from Turkey
