= Hikmet Sami Türk =

Turkish politician (born 1935)

Minister of National Defense of Turkey
- In office 11 January 1999 – 28 May 1999
- Prime Minister: Bulent Ecevit
- Preceded by: İsmet Sezgin
- Succeeded by: Sabahattin Çakmakoğlu

Personal details
- Born: 1935 (age 90–91) Of, Trabzon, Turkey
- Party: Democratic Left Party (1995 - 2002)

Hikmet Sami Türk (born 1935 in Of, Trabzon) is a Turkish academic and politician. He was at the faculty of law of Ankara University from 1967 until 1995. Elected to parliament from 1995 to 2002 for the Democratic Left Party, he was Minister of Defense and Minister of Justice. He joined the faculty of Bilkent University in 2005. On April 29, 2009 he survived an assassination attempt by Dev-Sol.

== Biography ==
Türk graduated from the Kabataş Erkek Lisesi, and then from Istanbul University's Law Faculty in 1958. He obtained a doctorate from the University of Cologne in 1964. Returning to Turkey he completed his military service and then joined the faculty of Ankara University in 1967, becoming a full professor in the law faculty in 1978, and teaching there until 1995.

In the 1995 and 1999 elections he was elected to the Grand National Assembly of Turkey for the Democratic Left Party (DSP). Under Prime Minister Mesut Yılmaz he was Minister of State for Human Rights in 1997 and Minister of Defence in 1999 (January to May), and then Minister of Justice under Prime Minister Bülent Ecevit. He left parliament in 2002, as in the 2002 elections his party failed to reach the 10% threshold needed to enter parliament. However he continued in his party as the vice chairman of the party. Although still a member of DSP, on 1 March 2018 he resigned from this post.

He joined the law faculty of Bilkent University in 2005. In 2009 he survived an attempt to assassinate him at Bilkent University, when a suicide-bomber's bomb failed to detonate. Turk assumed the attack was in retaliation on his approval of the new high security prisons in Turkey in 2000.
