= 2013 United States embassy bombing in Ankara =

Terrorist incident in Turkey

- Part of the DHKP/C insurgency in Turkey
- Location of Ankara Province in Turkey
- Location: 39.90773°N 32.85501°E; Embassy of the United States; Kavaklıdere, Ankara, Turkey
- Date: 1 February 2013; 13:15 EET (UTC+02:00)
- Target: United States embassy
- Attack type: Suicide bombing
- Deaths: 2 (including the perpetrator)
- Injuries: 3
- Perpetrator: Ecevit Şanlı (DHKP-C)

On 1 February 2013, a suicide bomber attacked the United States embassy in Ankara, Turkey, killing a security guard and wounding three others. The bombing was subsequently denounced as an act of terrorism by both Turkey and the United States.

== Attack ==
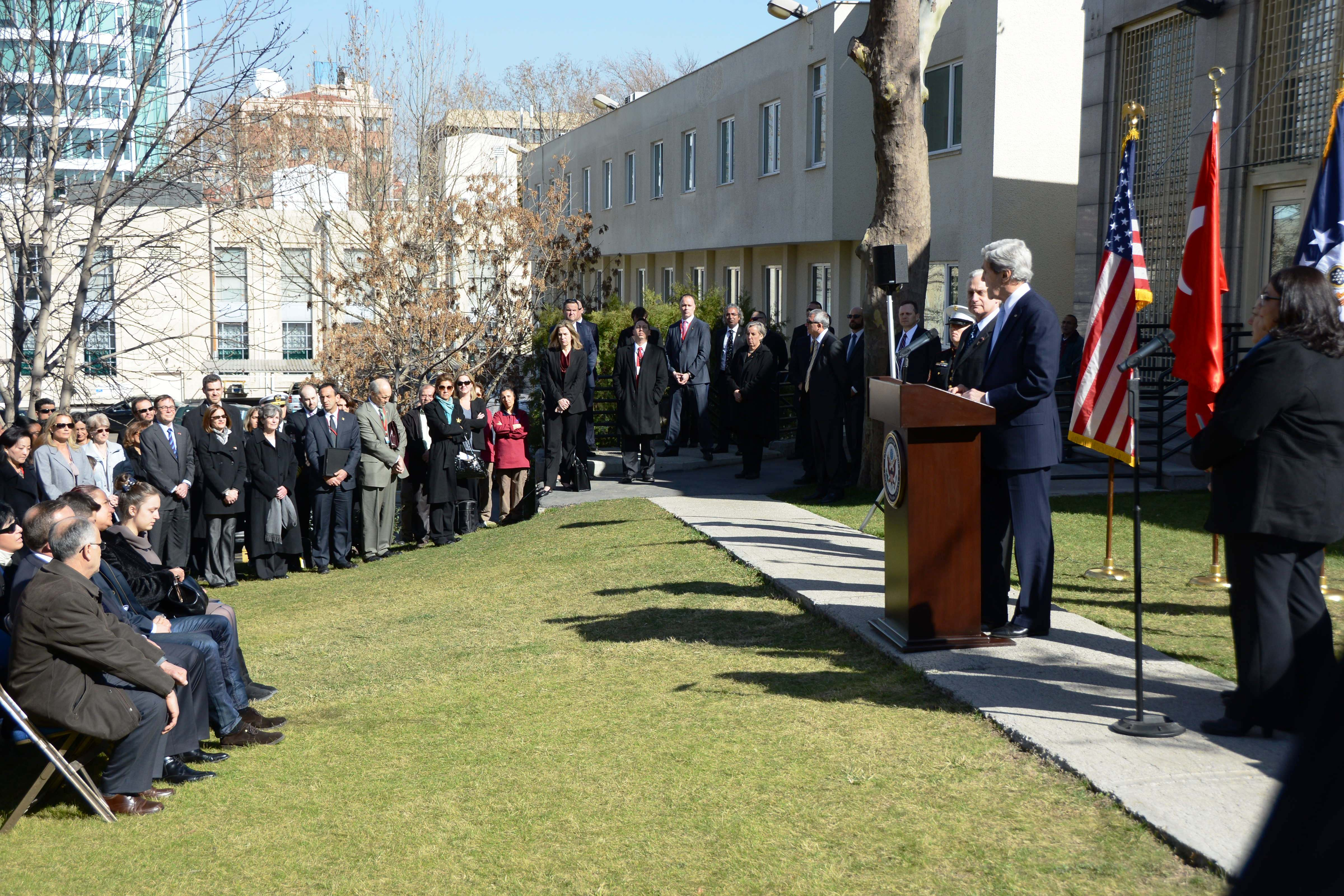
John Kerry, the US Secretary of State, gives a speech at a memorial ceremony in honor of Mustafa Akarsu at the embassy on 1 March 2013

At approximately 13:15 EET (11:15 UTC) on 1 February 2013, a suicide bomber detonated his explosives—6 kilograms (13 lb) of trinitrotoluene (TNT) and a hand grenade—at a side entrance to the United States embassy in the Kavaklıdere area of Ankara, killing a Turkish security guard and wounding three others. The explosion also seriously wounded journalist Didem Tuncay, who was rushed to hospital shortly after the attack had occurred. After visiting Tuncay in hospital, Francis J. Ricciardone, Jr., the United States ambassador to Turkey, described her as "one of the best" and added that she was due to have tea with him at the embassy. Ricciardone also paid tribute to Mustafa Akarsu, identified as the security guard who was killed in the bombing, saying that he was "a hero who [had] lost his life to protect the embassy staff".

== Perpetrator ==
The Revolutionary People's Liberation Party–Front, a Marxist–Leninist party designated as a terrorist organization by the Turkish government and the United States government, claimed responsibility for the attack in a statement published on its website on 2 February. It also cited Turkish support for the opposition in the Syrian civil war as a reason for the attack. Turkish officials reported that the bomber was Ecevit Şanlı, a 30-year-old member of the group. The group also confirmed in its statement that the attack was perpetrated by Şanlı and that he sacrificed himself. Şanlı was imprisoned from 1997 to 2000 for his involvement in an attack against a military guest house in Istanbul with a flamethrower. Due to their alleged roles in the bombing, three more people were also arrested in Istanbul and Ankara.

== See also ==
- 1998 United States embassy bombings
- 2007 Ankara bombing
- 2008 United States consulate in Istanbul attack
- 2012 Benghazi attack
- 2013 Reyhanlı car bombings
- Attacks on the United States
