= Necati Bilican =

Turkish civil servant

Necati Bilican (born 1941, in Özbaşı, Posof, Ardahan, Turkey) is a retired Turkish civil servant. He was governor of the OHAL state-of-emergency region from 1995 to 1997, and served three terms as Chief of the General Directorate of Security (April 1990 to July 1991; August 1997 to June 1998; July 1998 to June 1999). Bilican was retired in 1999, after his son's gang connections were exposed and the "tele-ear" wire-tapping scandal had seen him go on sick leave for two months. He had also been governor of Denizli Province (1985–1990) and Edirne Province (1991–1992).
