= Consulate General of the United States, Istanbul =

Diplomatic mission in Istanbul, Turkey

Consulate General of the United States of America Istanbul
- Seal of the United States Department of State
- United States Department of State
- Style: Consul General
- Nominator: President of the US
- Formation: 1906 (As embassy); 1937 (As consulate)
- Website: https://tr.usembassy.gov/embassy-consulates/istanbul/

The Consulate General of the United States, Istanbul is one of the diplomatic missions in Turkey. It was targeted in terrorist attacks in July 2008 and August 2015.

== History ==
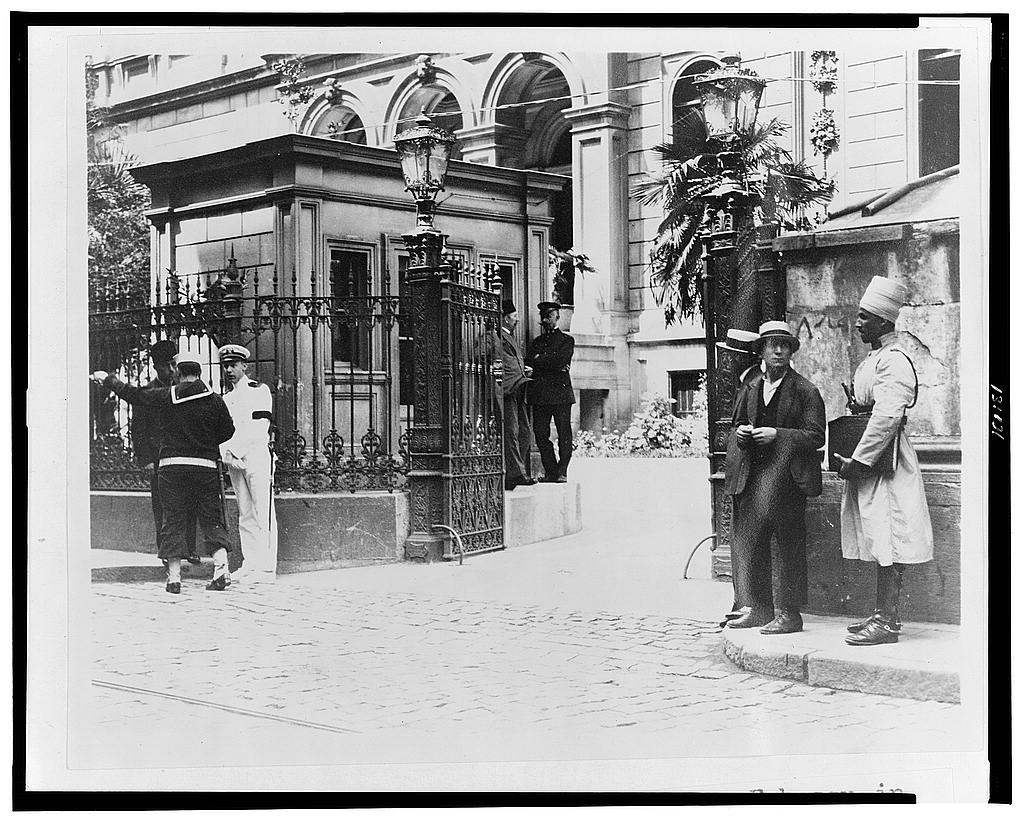
Entrance of the US Embassy in Constantinople, 1923

In 1907, the United States relocated its embassy to the Ottoman Empire to Palazzo Corpi, originally built in 1882. In 1908, a chancery annex designed by George Oakley Totten Jr. was added on the property's rear side. Following the Empire's abolition in 1922 and subsequent relocation of the Swedish embassy to the new capital of Ankara, the building became the U.S. consulate-general, until closing in 2003 after having been vulnerable to car bombs. It was then replaced with the present building.

== See also ==
- Embassy of the United States, Ankara
- Pera House

== See also ==
- Embassy of Turkey, Washington D.C.
- Ambassadors of Turkey to the United States
- Ambassadors of the United States to Turkey
- Diplomatic missions of the United States
