= Istanbul Justice Palace =

Courthouse in Istanbul, Turkey

- İstanbul Adalet Sarayı
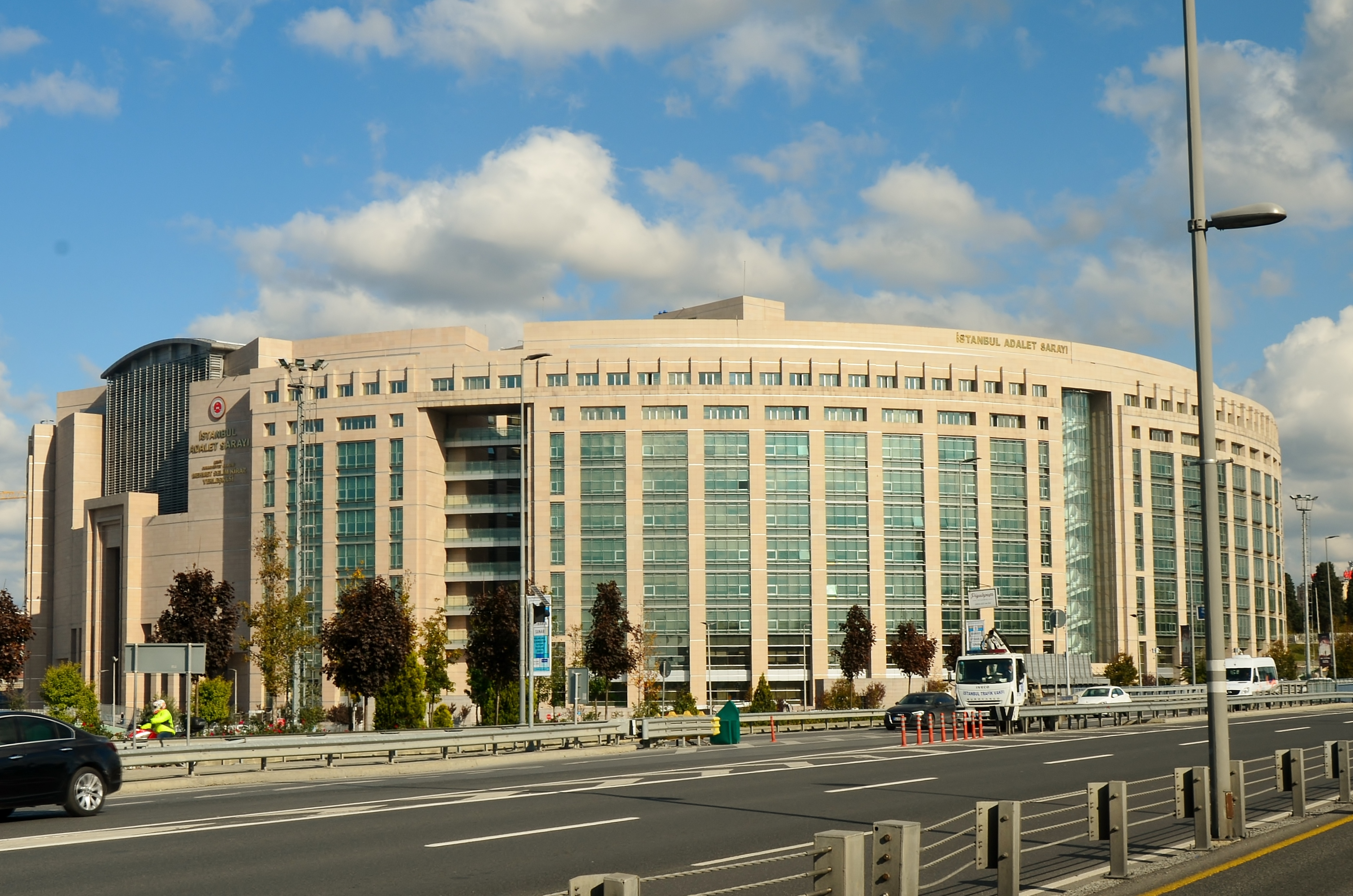
- Istanbul Palace of Justice in Çağlayan, Kağıthane, Istanbul, Turkey.
- Interactive map of Istanbul Justice Palace
- 41.069°N 28.979°E
- Established: 2011
- Location: Çağlayan, Kağıthane, Istanbul
- Coordinates: 41.069°N 28.979°E

The Istanbul Justice Palace (Turkish: İstanbul Adalet Sarayı) is a courthouse in the Kağıthane district of Istanbul, Turkey. Inaugurated in July 2011, it is the largest courthouse in Europe, with an area of over 300,000 m^{2} (3,200,000 sq ft). It was built by the VARYAP construction subsidiary of the Varlıbaş Group.

== Incidents ==
=== 2015 siege ===
On 31 March 2015, 2 suspected members of the Revolutionary People's Liberation Party-Front (DHKP-C) took prosecutor Mehmet Selim Kiraz hostage on the sixth floor of the Justice Palace. They demanded that the police announce the names of four members of the security services who they said were connected to the death of Berkin Elvan. The police negotiated with the gunmen for six hours, but eventually stormed the courthouse "because of gunshots heard from inside the prosecutor's office". The two gunmen died during the operation, while the prosecutor was badly wounded and later died of his injuries.

=== 2024 attack ===
On 6 February 2024, 2 suspected members of the Revolutionary People's Liberation Party-Front (DHKP-C) carried out an armed attack occurred on a police station near the palace. Both attackers were killed on sight and one civilian killed, while six other were left injured.
