= Adnan Ersöz =

Turkish general

Head of the National Intelligence Organization (MIT)
- In office 13 July 1978 – 19 November 1979
- President: Fahri Korutürk
- Preceded by: Hamza Gürgüç
- Succeeded by: Bülent Türker

Commander of the First Army of Turkey
- In office 25 August 1975 – 30 August 1977
- Preceded by: Hüseyin Doğan Özgöçmen
- Succeeded by: Nurettin Ersin

Personal details
- Born: 1917 Sarıyer, Ottoman Empire
- Died: 3 October 1991 (aged 73–74) Göztepe, Kadıköy, Istanbul, Turkey
- Education: Turkish Military Academy

Military service
- Allegiance: Turkey
- Branch/service: Turkish Land Forces
- Years of service: 1936–1977
- Rank: General

Adnan Ersöz (1917 – 13 October 1991) was a Turkish general, serving as Army General from 1973 to 1977. He was assassinated in 1991. He was Commander of the First Army of Turkey (1975–1977) and, after his retirement, head of the National Intelligence Organization (1978–1979).
