= Terrorism in Turkey =

Terrorism in Turkey is defined in Turkey's criminal law as crimes against the constitutional order and internal and external security of the state by the use of violence as incitement or systematic to create a general climate of fear and intimidation of the population and thereby effect political, religious, or ideological goals. Since the establishment of the Republic of Turkey, both organized groups, lone wolf, and international spy agencies have committed many acts of domestic terrorism against Turkish people.

This article serves as categorization and a compilation of acts of terrorism, attempts to commit acts of terrorism, and other such items which pertain to terrorist activities which are engaged in by non-state actors or spies who are acting in the interests of state actors or persons who are acting without the approval of foreign governments within the domestic borders of the Republic of Turkey.

== Geographic patterns ==
Terrorist attacks in Turkey have occurred in the southeastern and eastern provinces and major cities like Ankara and Istanbul. According to Nadir Öcal and Jülide Yildirim, most of the terrorist incidents in Turkey have been concentrated in South Eastern and Eastern Turkey and major cities.

== By ideology ==
The instability of Turkish Polity originated from the constitutional monarchy of the Ottoman Empire, which suffered dramatic movements that threatened to destroy its national being as early as the nationalist movement in Anatolia in 1919. Turkey's political liberalization began with Adnan Menderes and Celal Bayar's registering of the Democrat Party (DP) in January 1946. However, beginning in the 1960s the political instability had a new dimension. Political terrorism in Turkey:

...the emergence and escalation of political terrorism in Turkey took place just after the country's social scene had undergone rapid and far-reaching changes.. .the most important... [being] the transformation of Turkey from a predominantly rural society to an increasingly urban one.

=== Left Wing ===
Driven by a Marxist-Leninist ideology, these often small, lethal, urban terrorist groups flourished during the Cold War aiming to overthrow their country's democratic government and replace it with their "vision" of a proletarian rule.

Over the 1960s, Leftist radicals first attempted to challenge the political regime by use of sit-ins, street demonstrations, and the establishment of a new political party, the Turkish Labor Party (TLP). After only receiving 3% of the popular vote in the 1965 election, and 2.7% four years later, leftist radicals began to turn to a more militant approach.

==== Anti-government ====
Left-wing Anti-government

Revolutionary People's Liberation Party/Front

Communist Party of Turkey/Marxist–Leninist

Maoist Communist Party (Turkey)

1970s stemmed from the student protest movement in the 1960s.

Over the 1970s. Left-wing terrorism began in 1969 when the Proletarian Revolutionaries and Proletarian Socialists formed the Federation of Revolutionary Youth of Turkey (Dev-Genç). Knowledge on the use of explosives and weapons was provided by the Palestine Liberation Organization (PLO). Terror activities included bank robberies, bombings and kidnappings (for ransom). In 1971, the military declared martial law to arrest revolutionaries. By 1973, these incidents had stopped.

According to Turkish professor Sabri Sayari, more than 5,000 people were killed in hundreds of terrorist incidents between 1976 and 1980.

Over the 1970s, the Revolutionary People's Liberation Party/Front (DHKP/C) was established in 1994 following the breakup of the Dev Sol group. The anti-American group, which opposed Turkish membership in NATO and the "Turkish establishment ideology" has been involved in several high-profile attacks against American interests in Turkey, and was still active in 2015.

Over the 2000, The DHKP/C began a campaign of suicide bombings in 2001, combining the tactic with targeted assassination and the use of improvised explosives to attack the Turkish police. The violent campaign intensified in 2003 in response to Turkish support in Operation Iraqi Freedom.

DHKP/C resumed attacks against Turkish police in 2012 following a nearly decade-long hiatus. In March 2015 they took a Turkish prosecutor hostage who lost his life in the subsequent shootout with police. An unsuccessful suicide bombing attempt in April 2015 targeted the Istanbul headquarters of the Turkish police.

Event	Year	Deaths	Perpetrator(s)
2013 United States embassy bombing in Ankara	2013	2	DHKP-C

==== Separatist ====
Kurdistan Workers' Party (PKK), a Kurdish separatist group, was responsible for the vast majority of terrorist attacks through 1980s and 1990s. These attacks disproportionately affected the eastern and southeastern regions of Turkey, where the PKK focused its activities. Notable terrorist attacks throughout this period include Pınarcık, Bingöl and Blue Market massacres.

The 2016 Atatürk Airport attack, consisting of shootings and suicide bombings, occurred on 28 June 2016 at Atatürk Airport in Istanbul, Turkey. Three ISIL-linked terrorists murdered forty-five people and injured 230.

In February 2020, an Istanbul court acquitted novelist Aslı Erdoğan of charges of terrorist group membership and "undermining national unity". She was one of several staff members of the pro-Kurdish newspaper Özgür Gündem accused of having ties to Kurdish militants.

On 13 November 2022, an explosion took place on İstiklal Avenue in Istanbul's Beyoğlu district at 4:20 PM local time. According to the Governor of Istanbul, Ali Yerlikaya, the bombing left at least six people dead and 81 injured. A woman who left a bag on the avenue is the main suspect in the attack. However, no terrorist group has claimed responsibility for the attack. Interior Minister, Süleyman Soylu formally accused the Kurdistan Workers' Party (PKK) of being behind the attack.

The Kurdish group Kongra-Gel, which has been engaged in armed violence since the 1980s, continued its activities in southeastern Turkey and Iraqi Kurdistan. In addition to clashes between the Turkish Armed Forces and KGK in Iraqi Kurdistan, KGK intensified its campaign in Turkey, and was involved in the high-profile kidnapping of a Turkish parliamentary deputy in August 2012. Following the incident the group's leader, Abdullah Öcalan, entered into negotiations with Turkey, where he was in custody at the İmralı prison.

Despite a ceasefire between the government and KGK that remained in place for the duration of peace talks, KGK leaders continued to be frustrated with a lack of constitutional and legal protections. With the exception of some clashes in southeast Turkish over the construction of military outposts that Kurdish supporters view as incompatible with the peace process, the ceasefire held until 2015, when the Turkish government ordered the detention of suspected KGK members in Turkey and renewed attacks against KGK camps and weapon caches in Kurdish Iraq.

Event	Year	Deaths	Perpetrator(s)
1999 Istanbul bombings	1999	13	PKK
Blue Market massacre	1999	13	PKK
2007 Ankara bombing	2007	9	Kurdistan Freedom Hawks
Zirve Publishing House massacre	2007	3	
2008 Diyarbakır bombing	2008	5	PKK (claimed by Turkey)
2008 Istanbul bombings	2008	17	PKK (claimed by Turkey)
2010 Hakkâri bus bombing	2010	10	PKK
2010 Istanbul bombing	2010	1	Kurdistan Freedom Hawks
2011 Ankara bombing	2011	3	Kurdistan Freedom Hawks (suspected)
2012 Gaziantep bombing	2012	9	Disputed
2015 Sabiha Gökçen Airport bombing	2015	1	Kurdistan Freedom Hawks
February 2016 Ankara bombing	2016	30	Kurdistan Freedom Hawks
February 2016 Diyarbakır bombing	2016	6	HPG
March 2016 Ankara bombing	2016	38	Kurdistan Freedom Hawks
March 2016 Diyarbakır bombing	2016	7	Unknown
2016 Bursa bombing	2016	1	Kurdistan Freedom Hawks
May 2016 Diyarbakır bombing	2016	3	HPG
May 2016 Dürümlü bombing	2016	16	HPG
June 2016 Istanbul bombing	2016	13	Kurdistan Freedom Hawks
June 2016 Midyat bombing	2016	5	PKK (claimed by Turkey)
2024 Turkish Aerospace Industries headquarters attack	2024	5	PKK

=== Religious ===
In the 1980s and 1990s, Jihadist terrorism in Turkey was an isolated phenomenon represented by the Turkish Hezbollah and the Great Eastern Islamic Raiders' Front. Since the 2000s, there has been a rise in attacks from Islamist groups, some with links to Al-Qaeda.

==== Anti-government ====
One group that has been studied by researchers is the Turkish Hezbollah. Some scholars have argued that minimizing the risk posed by Iranian-backed Islamist terrorist groups in the 1990s enabled them to escalate their objectives of destroying the secular regime in Turkey and establishing an Iranian-style theocratic republic.

==== Hate (bias-motivated crime) ====
In July 1993, an arson attack took place where extremists set fire to a hotel where a cultural festival was taking place. Islamic groups attacked and threatened Jewish personalities and the Jewish community in Turkey.

According to the Stockholm Center for Freedom, the most targeted religious groups in 2022 were Alevis and Christians.

=== International ===
Origin of the group outside the country.

==== Anti-government ====
In October 2014 Kurds were protesting against both the Turkish authorities and sympathizers of ISIL while Turkish soldiers have been observed to have a "soft stance" towards ISIL militants and even killing a female protester against ISIL.

The March 2016 Ankara bombing killed at least 37 people and injured 125. The TAK claimed responsibility.

The Dokumacılar is an Islamic terrorist group composed of about 60 Turkish militants who joined ISIL. The group is responsible for the 2015 Suruç bombing which resulted in 32 deaths.

Other attacks, including the 2017 Istanbul nightclub shooting, were perpetrated by ISIL.

Event	Year	Deaths	Perpetrator(s)
2003 Istanbul bombings	2003	57	Al-Qaeda
2005 Kuşadası minibus bombing	2005	5	
Turkish Council of State shooting	2006	1	Alparslan Arslan
2008 United States consulate in Istanbul attack	2008	6	Unknown
2015 Istanbul suicide bombing	2015	2	ISIL
2015 Ankara bombings	2015	109	ISIL
January 2016 Istanbul bombing	2016	14	ISIL
2016 Atatürk Airport attack	2016	48	ISIL
August 2016 Gaziantep bombing	2016	57	ISIL
March 2016 Istanbul bombing	2016	5	ISIL linked militant
2022 Istanbul bombing	2022	6	Disputed
Istanbul nightclub shooting	2017	39	ISIL
2013 Reyhanlı car bombings	2013	52	Syrian Resistance (per Turkish government)

==== Hate (bias-motivated crime) ====
Two Armenian groups conducted several terror attacks aimed at Turkish diplomats.

One was the Armenian Revolutionary Federation (in Armenian Dashnaktsuthium, or "The Federation"), a revolutionary movement founded in Tiflis (Russian Transcaucasia) in 1890 by Christapor Mikaelian. Many members had been part of Narodnaya Volya or the Hunchakian Revolutionary Party. The group published newsletters, smuggled arms, and hijacked buildings as it sought to bring in European intervention that would force the Ottoman Empire to surrender control of its Armenian territories. On 24 August 1896, 17-year-old Babken Suni led twenty-six members in capturing the Imperial Ottoman Bank in Constantinople. The group backed down on a threat to blow up the bank. On 21 July 1905, a bombing perpetrated by the same group targeting Sultan Abdul Hamid II failed to kill the Sultan, while killing 26 and injuring 58 others.

JCAG (Justice Commandos of the Armenian Genocide). These attacks spawned a period of ten years from 1975 to 1985. Their efforts were mostly based overseas, but some attacks occurred in Turkey such as the May 1977 bombing of the Istanbul airport and railway and Ankara Esenboğa airport attack.

Event	Year	Deaths	Perpetrator(s)
Occupation of the Ottoman Bank	1896	10	Armenian Revolutionary Federation
Yıldız assassination attempt	1905	26	Armenian Revolutionary Federation
Ankara Esenboğa Airport attack	1982	10	ASALA

== Controversy ==
=== Freedom of speech ===
According to the US State Department "Turkey regularly used to criminalize the exercise of freedom of expression and peaceful assembly". 1.6 million people were investigated after being accused of terrorism between 2016 and 2020. Prominent figures of the Turkish opposition were accused of an alleged membership of a terrorist group. The definition of terrorism in Turkey is rather vague as it also includes a social media post or taking part in popular protests.

=== Effects on voting behavior ===
One study found that Turkish voters are highly sensitive to terrorism and that they blame the government for casualties. Additionally, exposure to terrorism leads to an increase in the vote share of the right-wing parties.

=== 2023 U.S. Department of State Terrorism Report: Turkey Section ===
The Country Reports on Terrorism, published by the U.S. Department of State, provide assessments regarding counterterrorism efforts worldwide. The 2023 report includes various evaluations concerning Turkey. The report covers Turkey's counterterrorism activities, legal regulations, human rights practices, and international cooperation.

==== Counterterrorism Activities ====
The report states that Turkey conducted operations throughout 2023 against groups such as the PKK, DHKP/C, and ISIS. It notes that the PKK carried out attacks targeting Turkey’s domestic and foreign interests, resulting in the deaths of 51 security personnel, 196 PKK members, and 11 civilians. Operations conducted by Turkish security forces in northern Iraq and northern Syria are also mentioned. Significant incidents highlighted in the report include the October 1 suicide attack targeting the Ministry of Interior building in Ankara and the December 22–23 PKK attacks in northern Iraq. In response to these attacks, Turkish airstrikes reportedly led to the deaths of 10 civilians and caused damage to civilian infrastructure, including healthcare and industrial facilities.

==== Cases Related to the Gülen Movement and U.S. Position ====
The report examines the judicial processes and arrests targeting individuals linked to the Gülen Movement, which Turkey holds responsible for the July 15, 2016 coup attempt. The U.S. does not recognize this movement as a terrorist organization and refers to its leader, Fethullah Gülen, as an "exiled cleric and political figure." It is noted that Gülen resides in the U.S., which has been a point of disagreement between the two nations. The report criticizes some of these cases, citing insufficient evidence and a lack of adherence to international legal standards.

==== Legal Processes and Human Rights ====
The report highlights concerns regarding Turkey's counterterrorism laws, stating that they are occasionally applied in ways that restrict freedom of expression and the right to peaceful assembly. Criticisms include claims of insufficient evidence and procedural deficiencies in detention and arrest practices.

==== Freedom of Expression and the Press ====
The report examines the impact of counterterrorism measures on freedom of expression and the press. It references the monitoring of social media accounts and arrests on charges of terrorism propaganda.

==== Countering the Financing of Terrorism ====
The report notes that Turkey remains on the Financial Action Task Force (FATF) gray list. It outlines steps taken by Turkey, such as introducing regulations concerning politically exposed persons, enhancing financial intelligence activities, and improving risk-based supervision. Additionally, more complex money laundering investigations and prosecutions are reported to have been carried out.

==== International Cooperation ====
The report details Turkey's contributions to the Global Coalition to Defeat ISIS, including its roles in the Africa Focus Group and the Communications Working Group. Turkey’s efforts in repatriating displaced foreign nationals and detainees are also highlighted.

== See also ==
- List of suicide attacks in Turkey
- Istanbul nightclub shooting
- Islamic terrorism in Europe
- List of terrorist incidents
- Terrorism in the United States
- Hindu terrorism
- Violence against Muslims in independent India
- Left-wing terrorism
- Right-wing terrorism
- Cascade Mall shooting
