= 2016 Ankara bombing =

The 2016 Ankara bombing may refer to:

- February 2016 Ankara bombing
- March 2016 Ankara bombing

== See also ==
- Ankara bombing (disambiguation)
