= Ankara bombing =

Ankara bombing may refer to:

- Ankara Esenboğa Airport attack in 1982
- 2007 Ankara bombing
- 2011 Ankara bombing
- 2013 United States embassy bombing in Ankara
- 2015 Ankara bombings
- February 2016 Ankara bombing
- March 2016 Ankara bombing
- 2023 Ankara bombing
- 2024 Turkish Aerospace Industries headquarters attack
