= 2016 Bursa bombing =

Terrorist incident in Turkey

- Part of Kurdish–Turkish conflict (2015–present)
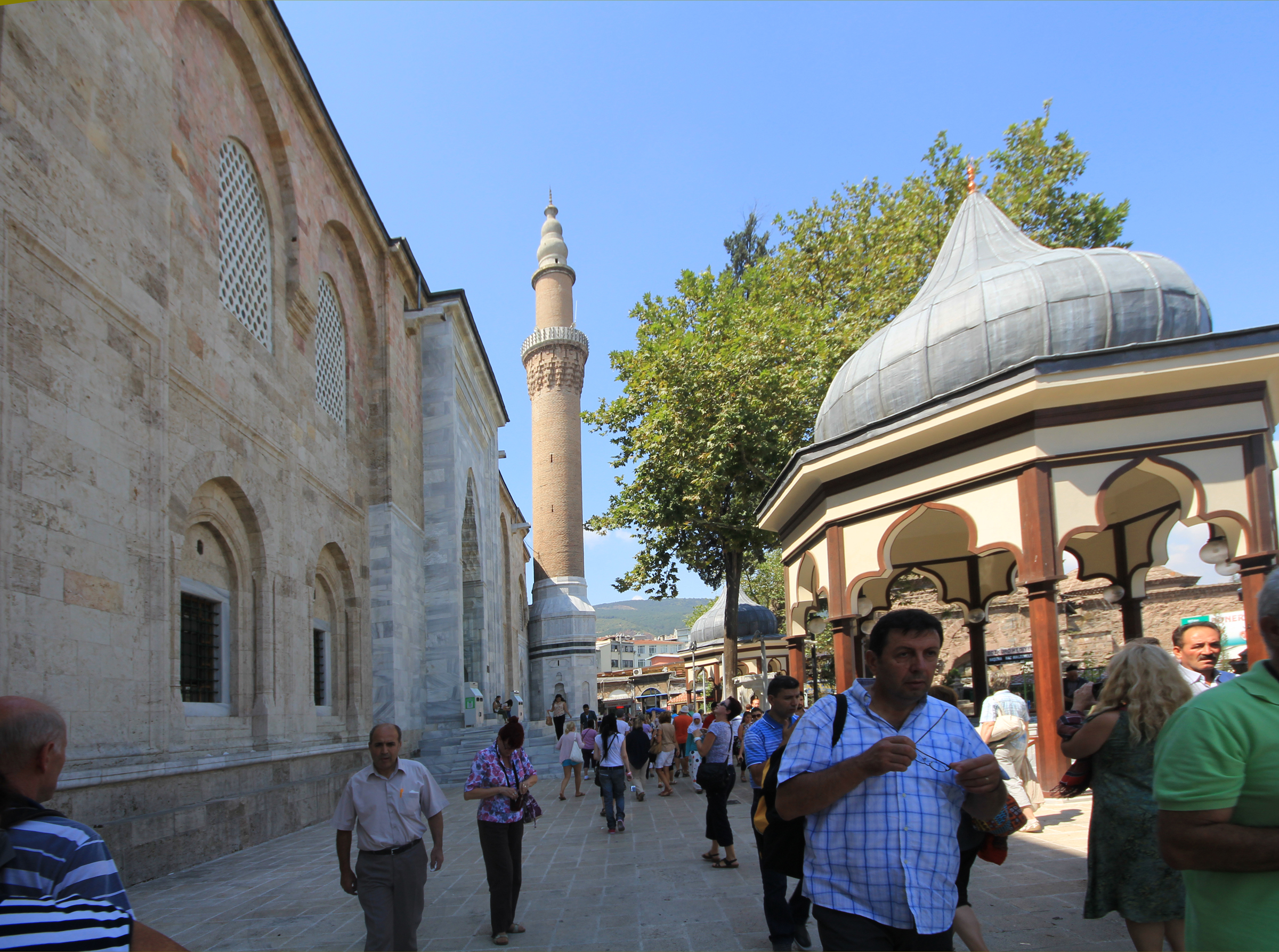
- Location: 40.1839°N 29.0617°E near Grand Mosque, Osmangazi, Bursa
- Date: 27 April 2016; 17:26 (UTC+3)
- Attack type: Suicide bombing
- Deaths: 1 (the perpetrator)
- Injuries: 13
- Perpetrator: TAK

On 27 April 2016, a suicide bombing took place in the Turkish city of Bursa. The bombing took place at 17:26 (UTC+3), near the western entrance of the Grand Mosque and a covered market. One person, the suicide bomber, was killed and 13 people were injured. The injured people received only light injuries. Extensive damage to nearby shops and cafes was reported.

== Bombing ==
The bombing occurred as a crowd that had gathered for a funeral prayer was dispersing. Those that were injured were struck by bomb fragments and broken glass. The suicide bomber was an approximately 25-year-old woman. The Interior Minister, Efkan Ala announced her identity as 1992-born Eser Çali, whose family lives in a small village of Iğdır Province near the Armenian border. The area is one that is always crowded and tourist groups were present at the time of the bombing. Security sources speaking to T24 suggested that the bomber might have blown herself up earlier than intended.

Following the bombing, the area was cleared of people by the police and Atatürk Avenue was closed off to traffic. Turkish people reacted on social media by tweeting "enough is enough".

The bombing came one day after a warning by the US Embassy in Turkey about "credible indications" of imminent terrorist attacks, urging American citizens to be "vigilant" in "crowded public areas and popular tourist destinations". Turkey had recently been hit by a number of bombings in the months preceding the bombing, most recently the March 2016 Istanbul bombing by the Islamic State of Iraq and the Levant and the March 2016 Ankara bombing by the Kurdistan Freedom Hawks (TAK), an offshoot and affiliate of the outlawed Kurdistan Workers' Party (PKK).

No immediate claim or official announcement with regards to the perpetrators of the attack was made. According to Turkish daily Cumhuriyet, security forces were investigating the possibility of the Islamic State of Iraq and the Levant having committed the attack. On May 1, TAK however claimed responsibility.
