= 2010 Istanbul bombing =

Kurdish militant suicide bombing in Istanbul, Turkey

Coordinates: 41.03694°N 28.98465°E

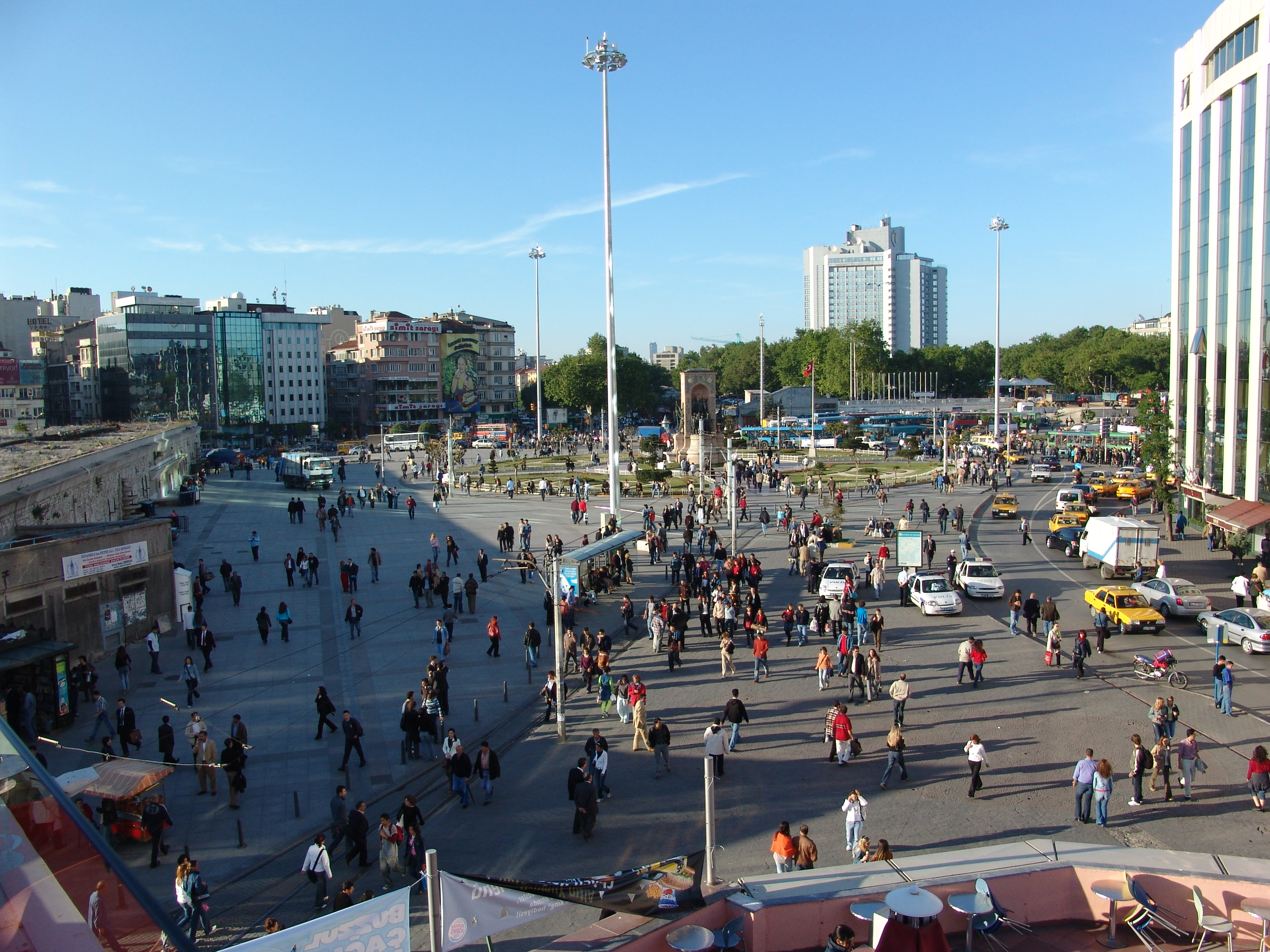
- View of Taksim Square
- Location: Taksim Square, Istanbul, Turkey
- Date: 31 October 2010; 10:34 (UTC+2)
- Attack type: Suicide bombing
- Deaths: 1 (the perpetrator)
- Injuries: 32
- Perpetrator: Kurdistan Freedom Hawks

The 2010 Istanbul bomb blast was a suicide bombing that took place on Taksim Square in Istanbul, Turkey on 31 October 2010. The bomb resulted in at least 32 injuries, 15 of whom were police officers and was claimed by a Kurdish secessionist group known as the Kurdistan Freedom Hawks (TAK).

== Attack ==
The explosion occurred in Taksim Square on the European side of the city. The blast was reportedly a suicide bombing, targeting the riot officers and police vehicles typically stationed in the area. Multiple additional explosive devices were reportedly discovered at the scene of the incident after bomb squads examined the area.

Seventeen of the injured were civilians, while fifteen were police.

== Responsibility ==
Initially, there were no official confirmations as to who carried out the attack, though many speculated that left-wing groups or the Kurdistan Workers' Party (PKK) were responsible. PKK never confirmed that they had organised the attack.

The day was significant as it was the day of final celebrations for Republic Day, marking the declaration of independence for the Turkish Republic, and Turkish President Abdullah Gül was due to arrive at a nearby location. The timing could also be significant since a unilateral ceasefire by the PKK declared two months earlier was due to expire on 31 October. The PKK, however, denied responsibility, with its spokesman, Roj Qandil, saying he had no "idea" about the bombing. The PKK also declared it was extending the unilateral ceasefire till the 2011 Turkish general election.

The TAK released a statement on their website claiming responsibility for the attack. The statement said that "We as TAK claim responsibility for the action carried out against the police force of Turkish fascism at Istanbul's Taksim Square on 31 Oct 2010." The PKK denied involvement in the attack.

== Reactions ==
- Turkey – Prime Minister Recep Tayyip Erdoğan said "Those who threaten Turkey's peace, security and development will not be tolerated."
- Arab League – Secretary-General of the Arab League Amr Moussa condemned the attack and said that attack was "unacceptable".
- Human Rights Watch – HRW (Human Rights Watch) condemned the attack.
- Israel – Israeli embassy in Turkey condemned the attack and said "We strongly condemn the heinous terrorist attack that was carried out indiscriminately."
- Jordan – King of Jordan Abdullah II sent a message to then Prime Minister of Turkey Ahmet Davutoğlu and condemned the attack.
- Kurdistan Regional Government – The Kurdistan Regional Government condemned the attack in a statement saying "The Kurdistan Region Presidency strongly condemns the terrorist attack that was perpetrated in central Istanbul on Sunday, wounding a large number of civilians and policemen. We send our sympathies to the victims and their families."
- Kuwait – Kuwait's Deputy Prime Minister and Foreign Minister Sheikh Mohammad Al-Salem Al-Sabah sent a message to Turkish Foreign Minister Ahmet Davutoğlu denouncing the attack as a "terrorist crime."
- Russia – President of Russia Vladimir Putin condemned the attack.
- South Africa – President Jacob Zuma stated: "As the government and the people of South Africa, we reach out in thoughts and prayers to the government and peoples of Turkey and wishing those wounded a speedy recovery. Violence and any other form of terrorist attacks will not advance world peace and stability in any country."
- United States – United States Secretary of State Hillary Clinton condemned the bombing, while also pledging to continue working with Turkey to "combat violent extremism. This is a shocking crime and the people of the United States stand in solidarity with our friends, the people of Turkey."
