= 2016 Kayseri bombing =

Terrorist incident in Turkey

Coordinates: 38.7022°N 35.5158°E

2016 Kayseri bombings
- Part of Kurdish–Turkish conflict (2015–present)
- Location: Kayseri, Turkey
- Date: 17 December 2016
- Target: 1st Commando brigade soldiers(Turkish claim)
- Attack type: Car bombing, Suicide bombing
- Deaths: 15 killed (14 soldiers and 1 perpetrator)
- Injuries: 55
- Perpetrator: Kurdistan Freedom Falcons (disputed)

On December 17, 2016, a suspected car bombing in Kayseri, Turkey killed 15 soldiers aboard a bus and wounded at least 55 others. According to the Daily Sabah newspaper, the soldiers — all low-ranking privates and non-commissioned officers — had been given permission for leave from the commando headquarters in the city. The explosion comes a week after 44 people were killed in a double bombing in Istanbul after a football match.

According to many Turkish newspapers, the bomb attack targeted 1st Commando brigade to which killed soldiers belonged. It was stated that the 1st Commando brigade, which contains special forces teams, had played active role against the commonly designated terrorist group Kurdistan Workers' Party (PKK) in Southeastern Turkey.

According to the Turkish newspaper Akşam, the commandos of 1st Commando brigade had played important role during the Siege of Sur (2016).

== Attack ==
Uniformed soldiers trained in the Kayseri Air Force Brigade, which was separated from the winter by private buses, were targeted to use for weekend offenses.

== Aftermath ==
On 19 December 2016, Turkish authorities detained 15 suspects under the ongoing investigation into the attack.

== Reactions ==
=== Domestic ===
Turkish Chief of General Staff Hulusi Akar said in a statement he made about the Kayseri attack, "We will fight with the terrorists at home and abroad, with the determination and determination to increase until the last terrorist is disabled."

=== Countries ===
- Albania - Ditmir Bushati, foreign minister of Albania, said he strongly condemned the violence & share the grief of people Turkey.
- Austria - Austrian foreign minister Sebastian Kurz said: "My heartfelt condolences for the victims of the bomb attack in Kayseri. We strongly condemn such acts of terror!"
- Azerbaijan - In a statement, Azerbaijani President Ilham Aliyev condemned "bloody incident" and said: "We support you in fighting terrorism that turns into a terrible calamity. We always stand by brotherly Turkey.”
- Canada - On Twitter, Foreign Minister Stephane Dion wrote "I condemn the attack in #Kayseri and offer my condolences to the families and friends of the victims."
- Egypt - In an official statement, Egypt's foreign ministry spokesman Ahmed Abu Zeid reiterated Egypt's stance against the terrorism.
- France - "We offer our condolences to the families of the victims and their families," Jean-Marc Ayrault, the French foreign minister said in a written statement.
- Germany - “We share the grief, stand in solidarity with Turkey. Nothing can justify this perfidious violence," the German Foreign Ministry said in a press release.
- Pakistan - Head of the Pakistan's foreign affairs ministry, Sartaj Aziz condemned the terrorist attack by saying "We condemn in the strongest possible terms the terrorist attack that took place in Kayseri today."
- Italy - Italian Foreign Minister Angelino Alfano condemned the bloody attack and expressed solidarity in the wake of the deadly attack, according to his official Twitter account.
- Spain - In a written statement, Spain's foreign affairs ministry said: "Spain shares the pain of the families of the victims, the people and the Turkish authorities in these difficult times and wishes the prompt and total healing of the wounded."
- Qatar - In a statement, the Qatari Ministry of Foreign Affairs expressed Qatar's solidarity with Turkey in all measures it takes to maintain its security and stability.
- Russia - President Vladimir Putin conveyed condolences to President Recep Tayyip Erdogan and said Russia was "ready" to cooperate with Turkey in fighting against terrorism, Kremlin press service said.
- Ukraine - On Twitter, President Petro Poroshenko posted: "Condemn a terrorist attack in Kayseri. Condolences to families of victims. We stand by Turkey. Terrorism is unjustifiable."
- United States - "We stand united with Turkey, our NATO Ally, in our determination to confront and defeat all forms of terrorism," White House National Security Council spokesman Ned Price said in a statement. Department of State spokesperson, John Kirby said “There is absolutely no justification for inhumane acts perpetrated against the Turkish people by terrorists." “We are in close touch with Turkish authorities and have offered our support to the ongoing investigation of this attack," he added.
