= Kurdistan Freedom Hawks =

Kurdish nationalist militant group in Turkey

- Teyrêbazên Azadiya Kurdistan
- Flag of the Kurdistan Freedom Hawks (TAK)
- Leader: Bahoz Erdal
- Dates active: 29 July 2004 – present
- Split from: PKK (TAK claim)
- Headquarters: Unknown
- Active regions: Turkey
- Ideology: Kurdish nationalism Separatism
- Size: A few dozen active members (2006)
- Wars: the Kurdish–Turkish conflict
- Website: https://www.teyrebazenkurdistan.com/

The Kurdistan Freedom Hawks, or TAK (Kurdish: Teyrêbazên Azadiya Kurdistan), is a Kurdish nationalist militant group in Turkey seeking an independent Kurdish state in Turkish Kurdistan (eastern and southeastern Turkey). The group also opposes the Turkish government's policies towards Kurds in Turkey. It has been designated as a terrorist organization by the US, UK and Australian governments.

The group presents itself as a break-away faction of the Kurdistan Workers Party (PKK) in open dissent with the PKK's readiness to compromise with the Turkish state. The PKK distances itself from the TAK, stating that the Turkish government uses the TAK to portray the PKK as a terrorist organization in the international arena, that the PKK only targets the Turkish Armed Forces or their proxies, that it always takes responsibility for its attacks, and that there are no links between the PKK and TAK. Analysts and experts disagree on whether or not the two groups are in reality linked.

The group first appeared in August 2004, just weeks after the PKK called off the 1999 truce, assuming responsibility for two hotel bombings in Istanbul which claimed two victims. Since then, TAK has followed a strategy of escalation, committing numerous violent bomb attacks throughout Turkey, with a focus on western and central Turkey, including some tourist areas in Istanbul, Ankara, and southern Mediterranean resorts. TAK also claimed responsibility for the February 2016 Ankara bombing, which killed at least 28 people, the March 2016 Ankara bombing in the same city that killed another 37 people, and the December 2016 Istanbul bombings which killed 47 people.

== Historical context ==
After several decades of oppressive measures by the Turkish government towards the ethnic Kurdish population of Turkey, the Kurdistan Workers' Party (PKK) was formed in 1978 in an aim to establish equal rights and self-determination for the Kurds in Turkey, who comprise between 18% and 25% of the population. Since 1984, however, an armed conflict began between the PKK and the Turkish security forces resulting in the deaths of around 7,000 Turkish security personnel and over 30,000 Kurds. Throughout the conflict, the European Court of Human Rights has condemned Turkey for thousands of human rights abuses.

The judgments are related to executions of Kurdish civilians, torturing, forced displacements, destroyed villages, arbitrary arrests, and murdered and disappeared Kurdish journalists. As a result of a brief PKK cease-fire in 2004, the Kurdistan Freedom Hawks were formed, a group that presents itself as a break-away faction of the PKK and is in open dissent with the PKK's readiness to compromise with the Turkish state. The TAK opposes, through militant action, the treatment of Kurds in Turkey and seeks retaliation for those Kurds who were killed at the hands of the Turkish government.

== Founding philosophy ==
The TAK seek an independent state of Kurdistan. The group violently opposes the Turkish government's policies towards its ethnic Kurdish citizens.

TAK first appeared in 2004. There is substantial debate on the origin, composition, and affiliations of the group. Some Turkish analysts claim that the group is either a small splinter of or an alias for the Kurdistan Workers' Party (PKK), the most active Kurdish militant group. Others suggest that the group may be totally independent of the PKK, or only loosely connected to it. PKK leaders deny having any control over the TAK. There are some indications that the TAK was founded by disgruntled or former members of the PKK.

== Structure ==
Little is known about the internal structure of the TAK. An employee of the later banned Kurdish German news agency MHA told Süddeutsche Zeitung in 2005 that representatives of the TAK would always remain anonymous and tight-lipped. The Freedom Hawks recruited a new generation of "frustrated young Kurds", raised in the Kurdish diaspora slums of Istanbul, Izmir and Ankara, after their parents had to flee the Kurdish villages depopulated by Turkey in the 1990s. Other Kurdish observers saw the Freedom Hawks as a socially disrooted youth, a new urban guerrilla born out of despair.

== Relationship with the PKK ==
According to the Jamestown Foundation, the TAK has been a rival to the PKK since 2006. From then on, the group's operations have been repeatedly at odds with Murat Karayılan's and other PKK leaders' repeated calls for a ceasefire followed by negotiations. However, Vera Eccarius-Kelly, a scholar of political science, has noted that there are no clear signs that indicate a struggle between the two groups. According to her, whilst TAK repeatedly damaged the PKK's efforts to negotiate cease-fires with "unapproved" bombings, in a way that has been compared to the Real IRA in the Northern Ireland conflict, the fact that there is no such struggle may have two explanations; the TAK may be operating outside the PKK's command structure, or it may be used by the PKK for "specific missions". TAK's origins however remain controversial.

Some Turkish security analysts alleged that Bahoz Erdal may be the leader of TAK. Other analysts believe that the group was initially formed by PKK leaders in 2003, when it engaged in illegal demonstrations, roadblocks and occasional Molotov cocktails. TAK has since claimed to have split from the PKK, accusing it of being "passive", most recently in December 2015, when they criticized the PKK's "humanist character" as inept in the face of "the methods used by the existing Turkish state fascism."

Some experts say that TAK is affiliated to the PKK; according to France24's correspondent in Turkey, "most" analysts share the view that whilst the TAK is affiliated to the PKK, it enjoys some operational autonomy. The National Consortium for the Study of Terrorism and Responses to Terrorism, an academic research centre funded by the US Department of Homeland Security, describes the TAK as the "special urban terrorism wing" of the PKK.

This view is shared by the White House, which called TAK the PKK's "urban terrorism wing" in October 2016. According to The Guardian, "Turkish officials as well as some security analysts say TAK still acts as a militant front of the PKK". Business Insider has reported that "experts who follow Kurdish militants say the groups retain ties". Istanbul-based Turkish independent security analyst Metin Gürcan, writing for Al-Monitor, described TAK as "a semi-autonomous, armed outfit that carries out attacks under the PKK umbrella", saying that while the PKK ideologically and financially supports TAK, it allows it to decide on the nature and timing of its attacks. Gürcan further wrote that the TAK was set up by the PKK but then split from it.

Aliza Marcus, a self-proclaimed expert on the PKK, also expressed her skepticism of the claims of separation by saying, "It would be the first time in the history of the PKK that they allow the existence of any other group representing the Kurds than themselves. In the 1990s, the PKK fought with rival Kurdish groups in Europe, it has killed dissidents within its own ranks. I see no reason why they would allow another group on the stage now." Marcus believes that it is unlikely that the TAK gets direct orders from PKK but thinks that the PKK has control over TAK's actions.

Newsweek and Al-Arabiya have written that the group is linked to the PKK while Deutsche Welle has described it as a breakaway from the PKK. In 2012, Human Rights Watch mentioned the TAK in its January 2012 report, calling the TAK "a group linked to PKK". According to Howard Eissenstat, a Turkey expert at St Lawrence University in New York, the TAK is damaging the PKK's short-term and long-term goals, and it's unlikely that the TAK is under PKK control.

PKK's spokesman Serhat Varto denied a link between the PKK and the TAK in an interview by saying that the PKK targets only military entities and that it always takes responsibility for its attacks. PKK leader Cemil Bayik also denied a link or any resemblance between the PKK and the TAK. He went on to claim that the Turkish government carries out attacks in the name of TAK to better characterise the PKK as a terrorist organization in the international arena.

In 2015, a member of TAK denied links with the PKK, saying "The target perspectives, manner of action, and tactics pursued by the PKK and other Kurdish organisations in war have a quite 'humanist' character in the face of the methods used by the existing Turkish state fascism against the Kurdish people. In this regard, we are not dependent on the target perspectives, manner of action and tactics of these organisations. We as TAK will determine and realize our independent action strategy, tactics and manner in line with the mission we have undertaken.

According to Stratfor, TAK claims to be separate from the PKK but is in fact the PKK's specialized urban terrorism wing.

== Designation as a terrorist organisation ==
The group has been designated as a terrorist organization by the US, UK and Australian governments, as well as by the European Union. The Turkish government regards the group as part of the PKK and does not list it separately.

== Attacks ==
TAK has claimed responsibility for a number of attacks against police officers, soldiers, government and business institutions since 2004. Its earliest attacks were small, non-lethal bombings in public places which the group described as "warning actions." These warnings, however, had become deadly by the summer of 2005. TAK also issued a statement warning tourists that while they are not direct targets, tourist attractions and cities which generate revenue for the Turkish state as considered valid targets.

- 20 people were injured when a bomb exploded at Çeşme, a coastal resort town on July 10, 2005.
- Less than one week later, five people were killed and more than a dozen wounded when a bus was blown up in the seaside town of Kuşadası. This type of attack against a tourist target is perhaps the signature tactic of TAK. The group has targeted civilians to discourage tourism in Turkey by attacking targets such as hotels and ATMs. TAK claims to have no desire to kill foreigners, only that it wishes to cut off a key source of revenue for the Turkish government.
- In 2006 the group's attacks continued, including a failed plot to attack a bus carrying legal officials on April 12, 2006. Five of the group's members were arrested when the plot was broken up.
- The group also claimed responsibility for an April 5, 2006 attack on a district office of the Justice and Development Party in Istanbul.
- In March, one person was killed and thirteen injured when TAK detonated a bomb near a bus station in Istanbul.
- On August 28, 2006, The Kurdish Freedom Hawks attacked the resort area of Marmaris with three explosions, at least two of which bombs were hidden in garbage cans. In the resort city of Antalya, 20 were injured when another explosion went off and 3 were killed. A final bomb detonated in Turkey's largest city of Istanbul where more than 20 people were injured. A separate attack is claimed to have been stopped in the port city of İzmir when a raid turned up plastic explosives. The group's website states the rash of attacks are revenge for the imprisonment of Abdullah Ocalan, the figurehead for the armed Kurdish nationalist movement.
- On August 30, 2006, the town of Mersin was attacked via a bomb planted in a rubbish container on Inonu street, one person was injured. The bombing is believed to be linked to the recent attacks by TAK, however they have not claimed responsibility.
- In the July 2008 bombings, the deadliest attack against civilians in Turkey since 2003, two bombs hit a shopping mile in Güngören district of Istanbul.
- In June 2010, they blew up a military bus in Istanbul, killing four people including 3 soldiers and a 17-year-old girl. This was received by observers as a "resumption of guerrilla warfare" which "brings to a final end an unofficial truce between the PKK and the government, which last year launched an initiative giving Kurds greater civil rights."
- On October 31, 2010, a suicide bomber detonated a bomb on Taksim Square in Istanbul, Turkey, killing the perpetrator and resulting in 32 injuries, 15 of whom were police officers. The bombing is believed to be linked to TAK, however they have not claimed responsibility.
- September 20, 2011 3 people died and 34 people were injured in a bomb attack in Ankara. Kurdistan Freedom Hawks claimed the attack.
- On December 23, 2015 Istanbul's Sabiha Gökçen International Airport was hit by mortar fire from the Kurdistan Freedom Hawks.
- On February 17, 2016, the Kurdistan Freedom Hawks attacked military buses in Ankara killing 28 Turkish military personnel and 1 civilian. The group claimed responsibility two days later, on 19 of February.
- On March 13, 2016, a car bombing in the Kizilay district of Ankara killed 37 and injured more than 120 others. TAK claimed responsibility for the attack on March 17.
- On April 27, 2016, a suicide bomber blew herself up in the northwestern city of Bursa leaving thirteen people wounded. TAK claimed responsibility for the Bursa attack on May 1, 2016.
- On June 7, 2016, a bomb targeting a police bus in Istanbul detonated, killing seven police officers and four civilians. TAK claimed responsibility for the bomb, warning tourists that Turkey wouldn't be a safe destination any longer.
- On October 6, 2016, Kurdistan Freedom Hawks (TAK) claimed responsibility a bomb attack was carried out in İstanbul's Yenibosna district outside of police station on October 6, causing 10 civilians to get wounded.
- On November 24, 2016, TAK claimed responsibility for a car bomb attack that killed two people and wounded 30 more in the Turkish city of Adana, according to a statement on its website.
- On December 10, 2016, a car bombing and a suicide bomber in the Beşiktaş district of Istanbul killed 46 people, of which 37 were police officers, and injured at least 160 others. TAK claimed responsibility for the attack the day after.
- On December 20, 2016, TAK claimed responsibility for Kayseri bombing which killed 14 soldiers.
- On January 5, 2017 TAK claimed responsibility for a car bombing at a court house in İzmir which killed a police officer and a courthouse employee, as well as injuring 9 others. This erupted into a shootout between police and the suspected perpetrators where 2 TAK members died and 1 fled.
- On November 10, 2017 The female TAK Fighter Çiçek Karabulut was killed with a hand grenade after a gunfight in Mardin, Mardin Province. The organization claimed this incident in a statement published on January 17, 2018.
