= 2015 Sabiha Gökçen Airport bombing =

Terrorist attack in Istanbul, Turkey

- Part of Kurdish–Turkish conflict (2015–present)
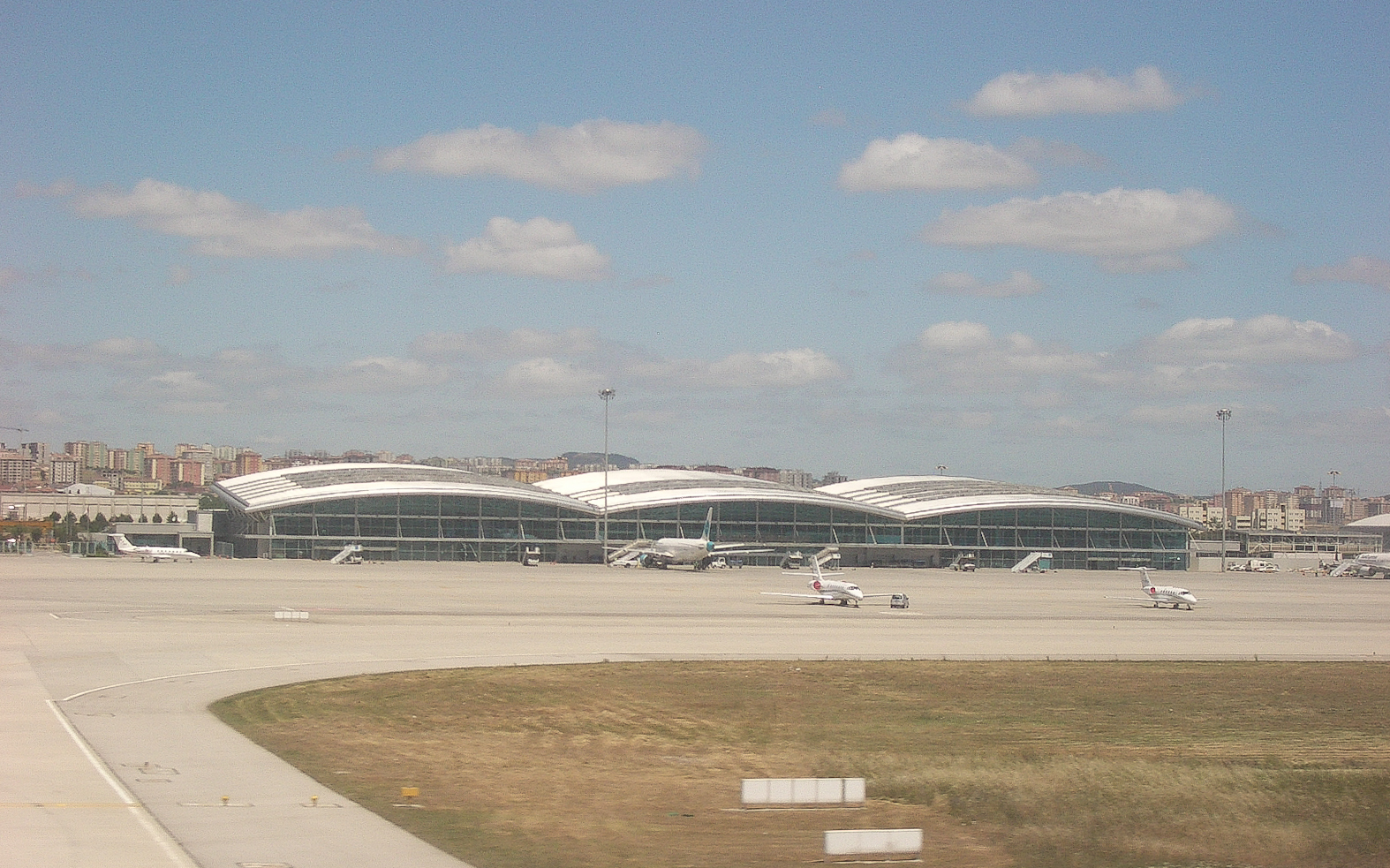
- Airport apron of Sabiha Gökçen International Airport, where the blast occurred
- Location: 40°53′54″N 29°18′33″E; Sabiha Gökçen International Airport, Istanbul, Turkey
- Date: 23 December 2015; 02:05 (EEST)
- Attack type: mortar bombing
- Deaths: 1
- Injuries: 1
- Perpetrator: Kurdistan Freedom Hawks

The Sabiha Gökçen Airport bombing took place on 23 December 2015 in the apron area of Sabiha Gökçen International Airport in Istanbul, Turkey. The explosion, which occurred at approximately 02:05 local time, wounded two airport cleaners, one of whom later died after being taken to hospital. Flights from the terminal resumed as normal while Binali Yıldırım, the Minister of Transport, Maritime and Communication, claimed that there had been no security lapses at the airport. Witnesses initially claimed that they heard three successive blasts, though their cause was unknown and investigators refused to rule out terrorism as a motive. The Daily Telegraph claimed that the blast was most likely caused by a bomb.

The explosion occurred while the Turkish military had been continuing its armed operations against Kurdistan Workers' Party (PKK) militants in the south-east of the country, causing unrest and tensions between Kurdish citizens and the Turkish state ever since a ceasefire and peace negotiations between the two sides broke down in July 2015.

On 27 December 2015, four days after the attack, the Kurdistan Freedom Hawks (TAK) claimed responsibility for the explosion, announcing that it was a result of a mortar bombing in retaliation for the Turkish Army's continued military operations in Kurdish populated cities in the south-east. The TAK is an urban-based offshoot of the PKK.

The attacker was arrested on 28 October 2017 in Istanbul.

== Explosion ==
The explosion was heard at approximately 02:05 EEST on 23 December 2015, though eyewitnesses claimed that they heard three successive blasts. Initial investigations did not show clear evidence of terrorism, though the Ministry of Transport, Maritime and Communication stated there were no weaknesses in the airport's security.

The Daily Telegraph held an interview with an aviation expert in regards to the blast, who speculated that the explosion had been caused by a bomb. It was claimed in the interview that an interior mechanical fault within a plane would not cause a blast big enough to damage five other planes in the vicinity. The damage to the five planes was attributed to shrapnel caused by a bombing.

== Impact and casualties ==
Two cleaning workers on the site were wounded, with one of them, Zeyhra Yamaç, later dying from head injuries caused by the blast. The Minister of Transport, Maritime and Communication, Binali Yıldırım, said that the explosion had damaged five planes, which were later taken to hangars for repair. Flights out of the airport continued despite the explosion.

== Perpetrators ==
On 27 December 2015, the Kurdistan Freedom Hawks (TAK) claimed responsibility for the explosion and declared that the blast had been due to a mortar bomb. The TAK gave their motive to be the ongoing 'fascist' military operations by the Turkish Armed Forces in mainly Kurdish-populated south-eastern cities, designed to combat PKK militants in the region.

The attacker was arrested on 28 October 2017 in Istanbul.

== See also ==
- 2015 Ankara bombings
- 2015 Suruç bombing
- 2015 Diyarbakır rally bombings
- 2016 Istanbul Atatürk Airport attack
