= Grand Mosque of Bursa =

14th-century Ottoman-era mosque in northwestern Turkey

- Turkish: Bursa Ulu Cami
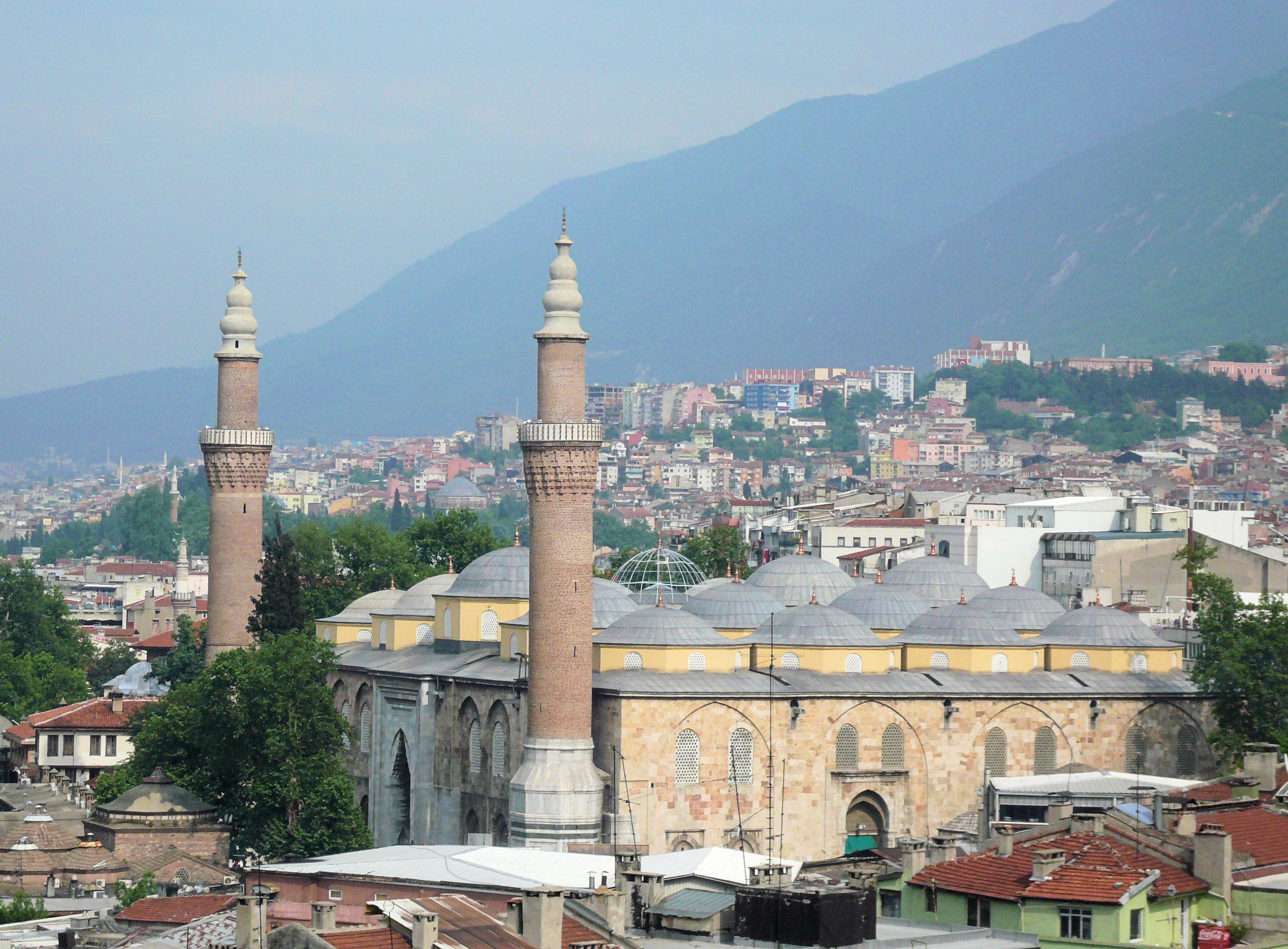

- Location of the mosque in Turkey

Religion
- Affiliation: Islam
- Ecclesiastical or organizational status: Mosque
- Status: Active

Location
- Location: Bursa, Turkey
- Interactive map of Grand Mosque of Bursa
- Coordinates: 40°11′02″N 29°03′42″E

Architecture
- Architect: Ali Neccar
- Type: Mosque architecture
- Style: Islamic, Ottoman
- Groundbreaking: 1396
- Completed: 1399; 627 years ago

Specifications
- Dome: 20
- Minaret: 2

Website
- kulturportali.gov.tr/turkiye/bursa/gezilecekyer/bursa-ulu-cami

The Grand Mosque of Bursa (Turkish: Bursa Ulu Cami) is a historic mosque in Bursa, Turkey. It was commissioned by the Ottoman Sultan Bayezid I to commemorate his great victory at the Battle of Nicopolis and built between 1396 and 1399. The mosque is a major monument of early Ottoman architecture and one of the most important mosques in the city, located in the heart of the old city alongside its historic markets.

== Historical background ==
The Ulu Cami or "Great Mosque" is the largest mosque in Bursa, the first capital of the Ottoman Empire, and a landmark of early Ottoman architecture as it evolved out of Seljuk Turkish architecture. Ordered by Sultan Bayezid I, the mosque was designed and built by architect Ali Neccar in 1396–1399. Bayezid I was the fourth ruler of the Ottoman Empire. Shortly after the construction of this mosque he suffered one of the empire's worse defeats at the hands of Timur (Tamerlane) at the Battle of Ankara in 1402. Tradition holds that Timur went on to burn the mosque that same year and that the Qaramanid ruler Mehmed Bey did so again during a siege of the city in 1412. Whatever the case, the first recorded repairs to the mosque took place in 1493.

The mosque underwent further restorations across its history. Following a damaging earthquake in 1855 which caused the roof to collapse, the mosque was closed for a number of years. Repairs were completed in 1889.

== Architecture ==
Video: Interior of the Grand Mosque of Bursa, 2017

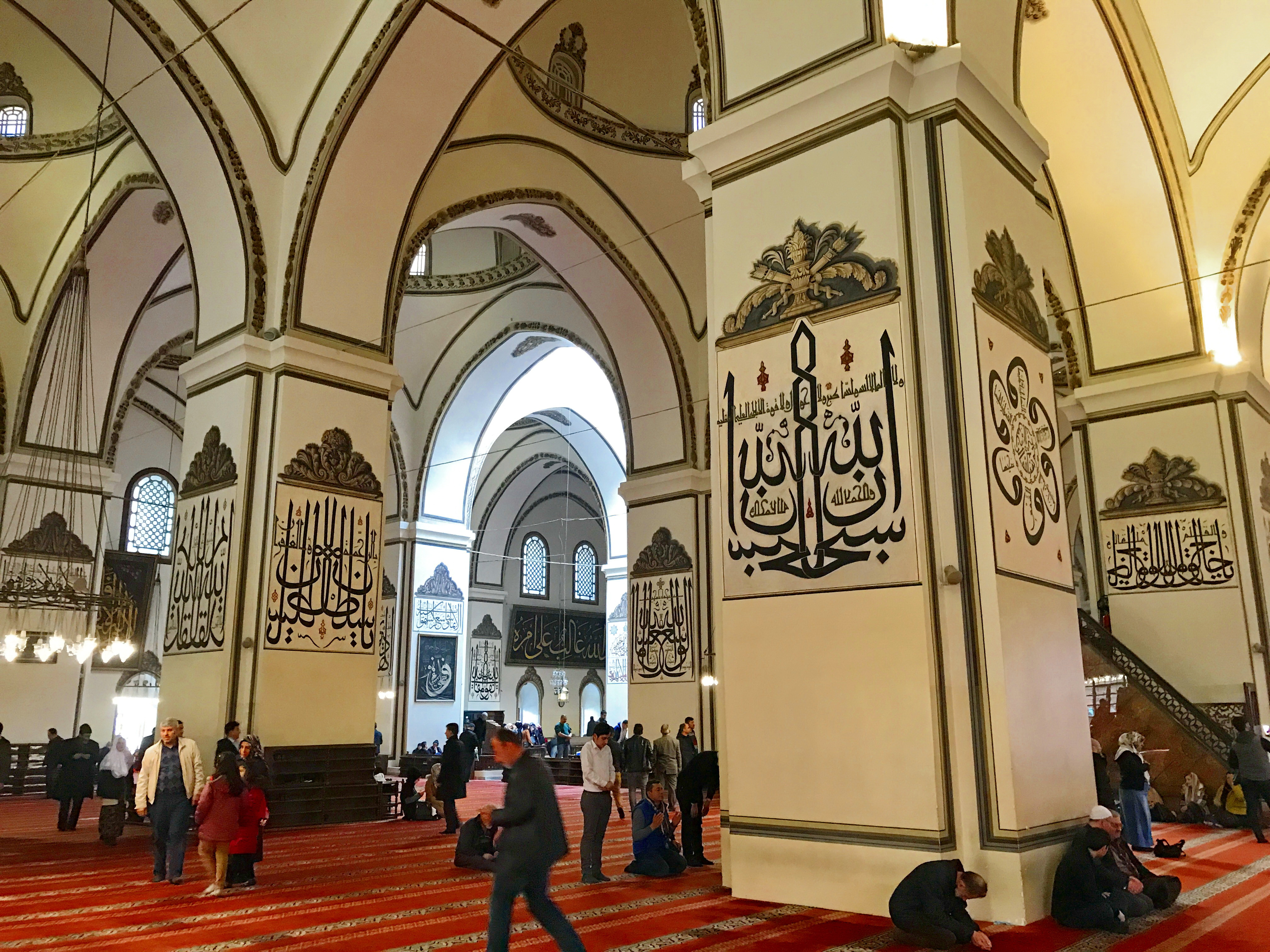
The interior of the mosque

The mosque is a large rectangular building measuring 55 by 69 meters with an interior surface area of 3165.5 square meters. It has three entrances (to the north, west and east), of which the northern entrance is the most monumental. Its interior space is covered by twenty domes arranged in four rows of five that are supported by twelve columns. The space can hold 5000 individuals. A popular tradition holds that Sultan Bayezid I built a mosque of twenty domes instead of building twenty separate mosques which he had promised in return for winning the Battle of Nicopolis in 1396.

At the mosque's center is a unique fountain (şadırvan) over a water basin with eighteen corners, which in its current form dates from the 19th century. The fountain and water basin helped worshipers in performing their ritual ablutions. The dome over the şadırvan is open to the sky (though covered by glass today), creating a skylight which helps to illuminate the mosque's dark interior.

The mosque has two minarets. While the western minaret is directly attached to the mosque and dates to the time of Bayezid I, the eastern minaret stands detached, suggesting that it may have been built at another time separately from the mosque.

The mosque's walls are painted with Ottoman Baroque-style decoration from the 19th century, as well as with calligraphic compositions from the 18th to early 20th centuries. The mihrab (niche symbolizing the direction of prayer), carved with a canopy of muqarnas, dates from 1572 by a craftsman named Mehmed and was commissioned by a patron named Zeyni Çelebi. Its painted and gilded decoration dates from 1905.

The wooden minbar, next to the mihrab, is made in the traditional Anatolian Seljuk style using the kundekari technique (using interlocking pieces of wood held together without nails or glue). The surfaces of the minbar are carved with geometric patterns and arabesque floral patterns. According to a carved inscription, it was made by a craftsman named Hacı Mehmed of Antep, son of Abdülaziz, in 1400.

Earthquakes are a major structural concern for the mosque, as they are with other buildings in Turkey. “Earthquakes are considerable threats to historically and culturally significant buildings in Turkey, with its active tectonics and seismicity”. The mosque was seriously damaged by earthquake at least once in 1855, which required its closure for many years and major repairs and reconstruction.

== Islamic calligraphy in the mosque ==
The Grand Mosque is well known for its decorative calligraphy and has even been called a “calligraphy museum”. In Islamic architecture, Arabic calligraphy became a major element for visual decoration and communicating meaning to visitors. The mosque contains 192 monumental wall inscriptions, consisting of 87 different compositions written by 41 different major Ottoman calligraphers of that period. Most of the calligraphy dates from between 1778 and 1938. The calligraphy is painted on the walls, columns and on small and large plates or medallions. The compositions include Qur'anic verses, hadiths, the 99 names of Allah, the different names of the Prophet Muhammad, and the names of major Islamic scholars.

== Gallery ==
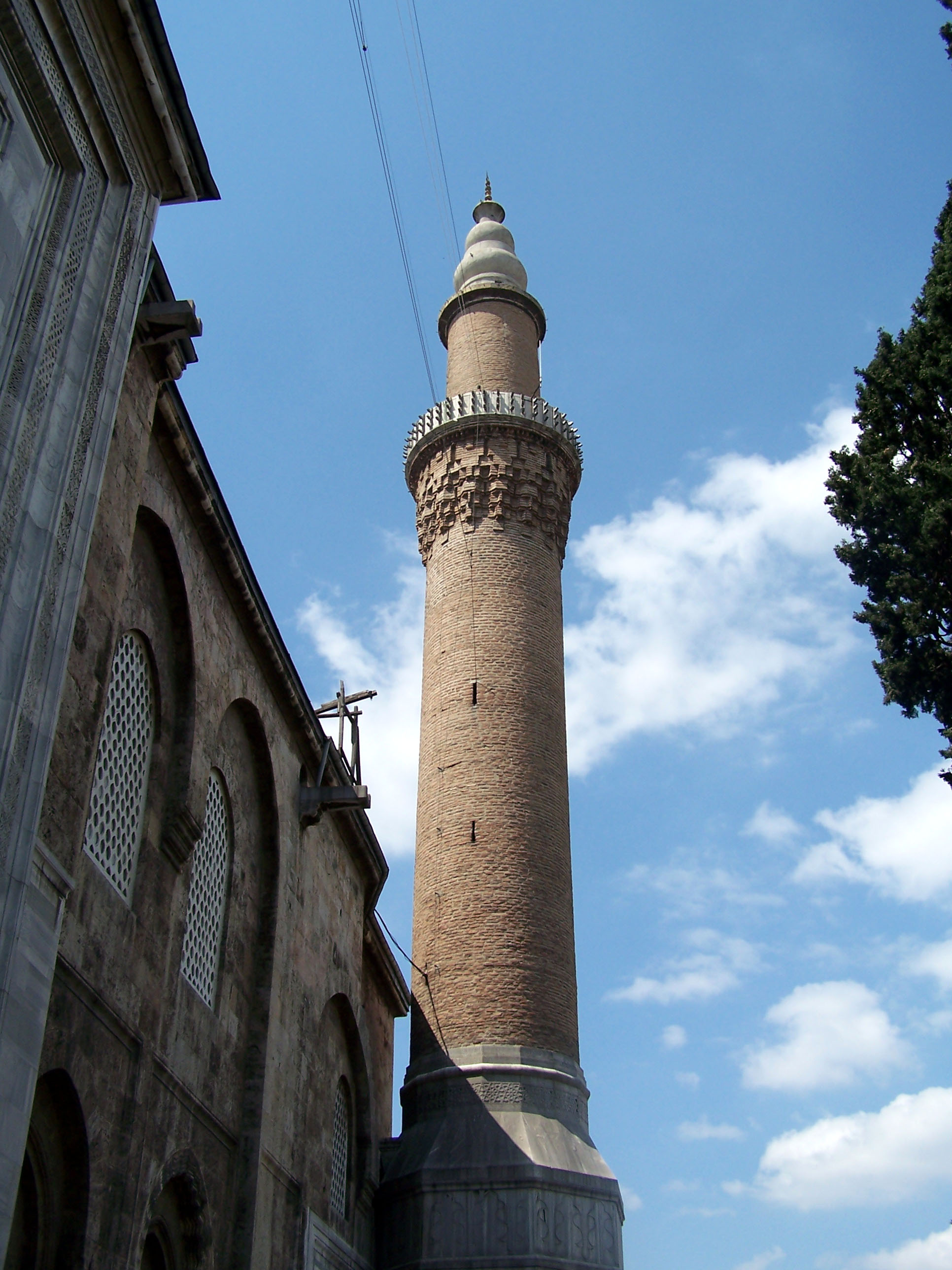
One of the minarets

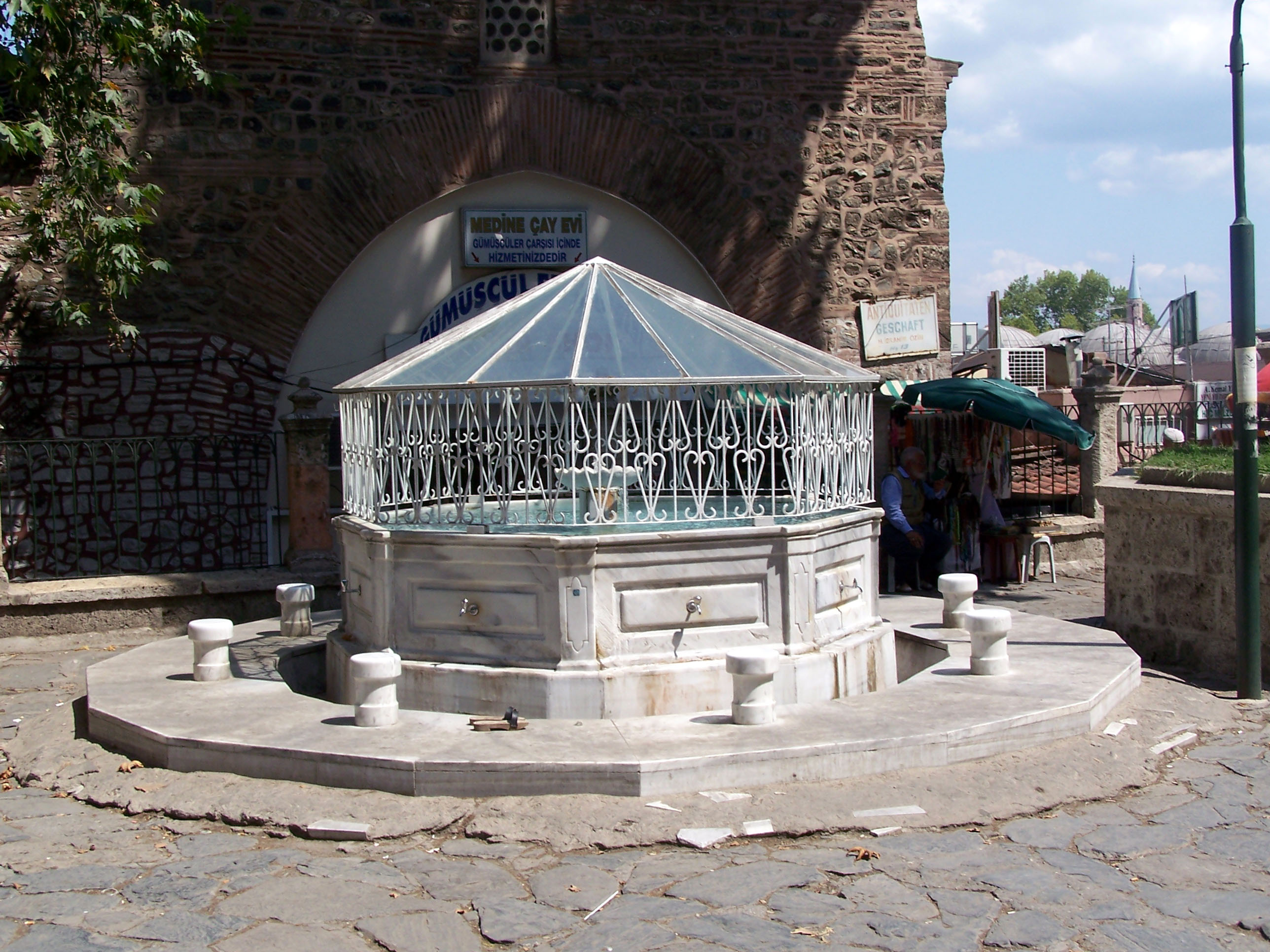
Ablution fountain (şadırvan) in the courtyard

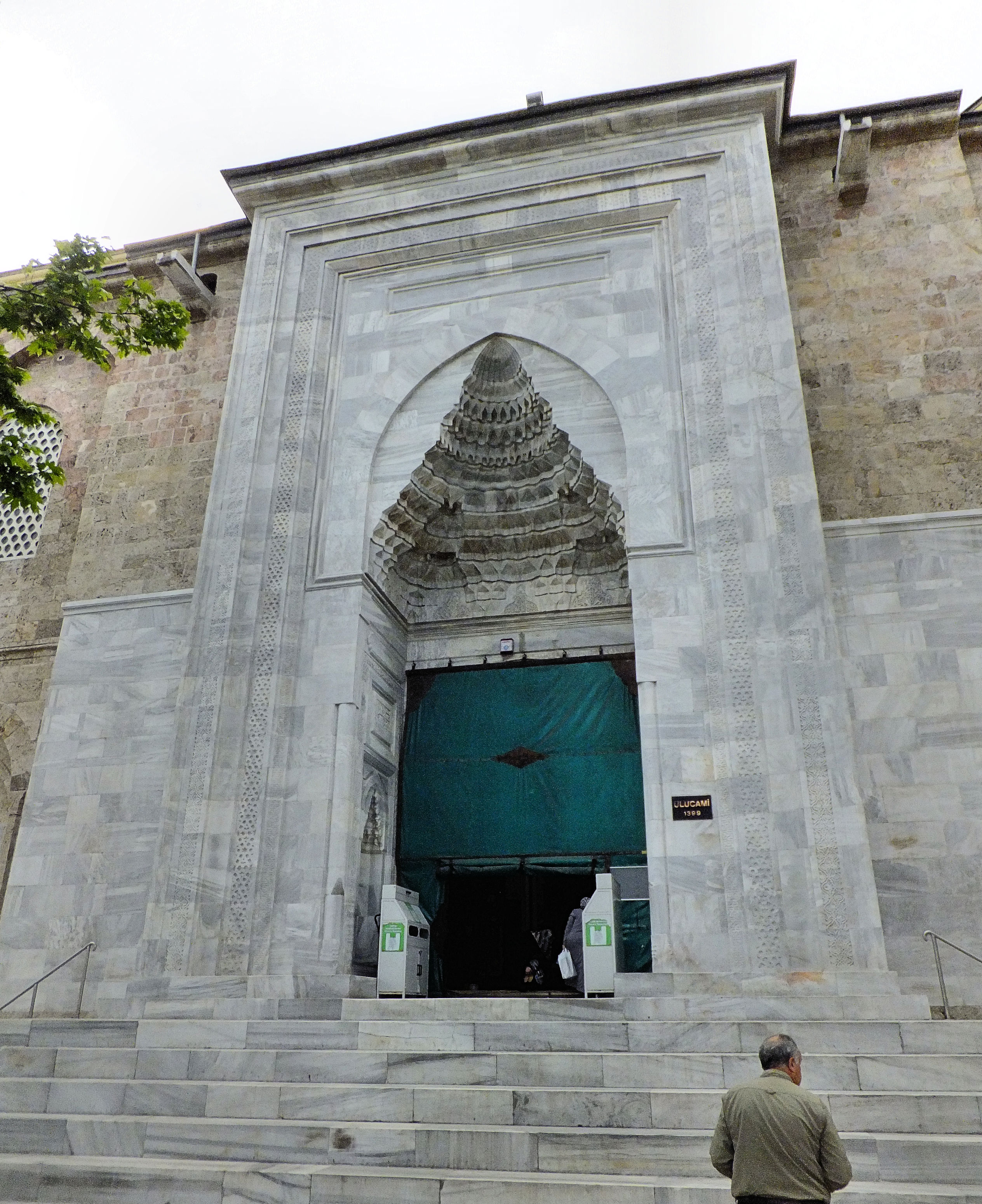
The main northern entrance of the mosque

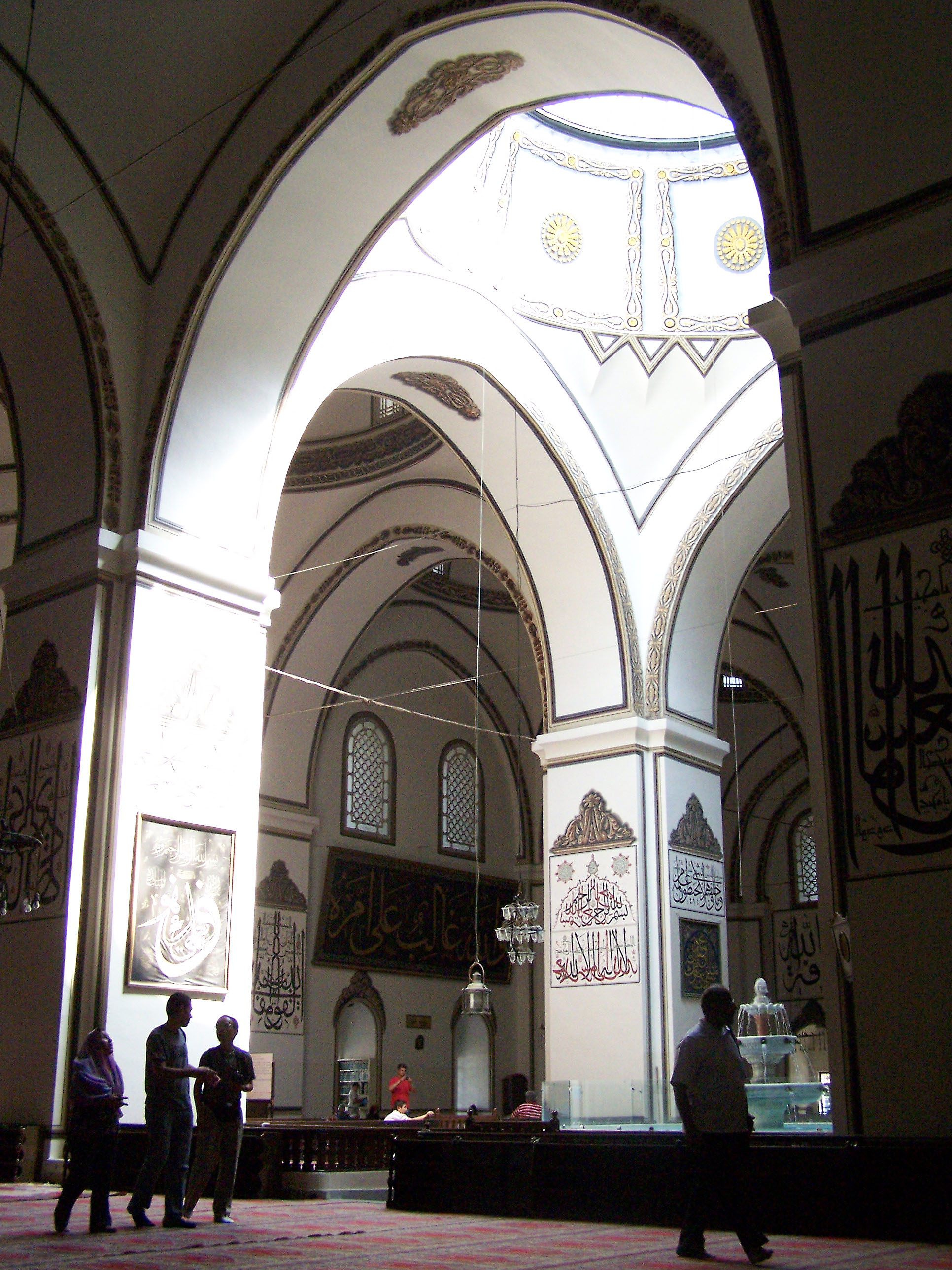
View of the center of the mosque, near the skylight

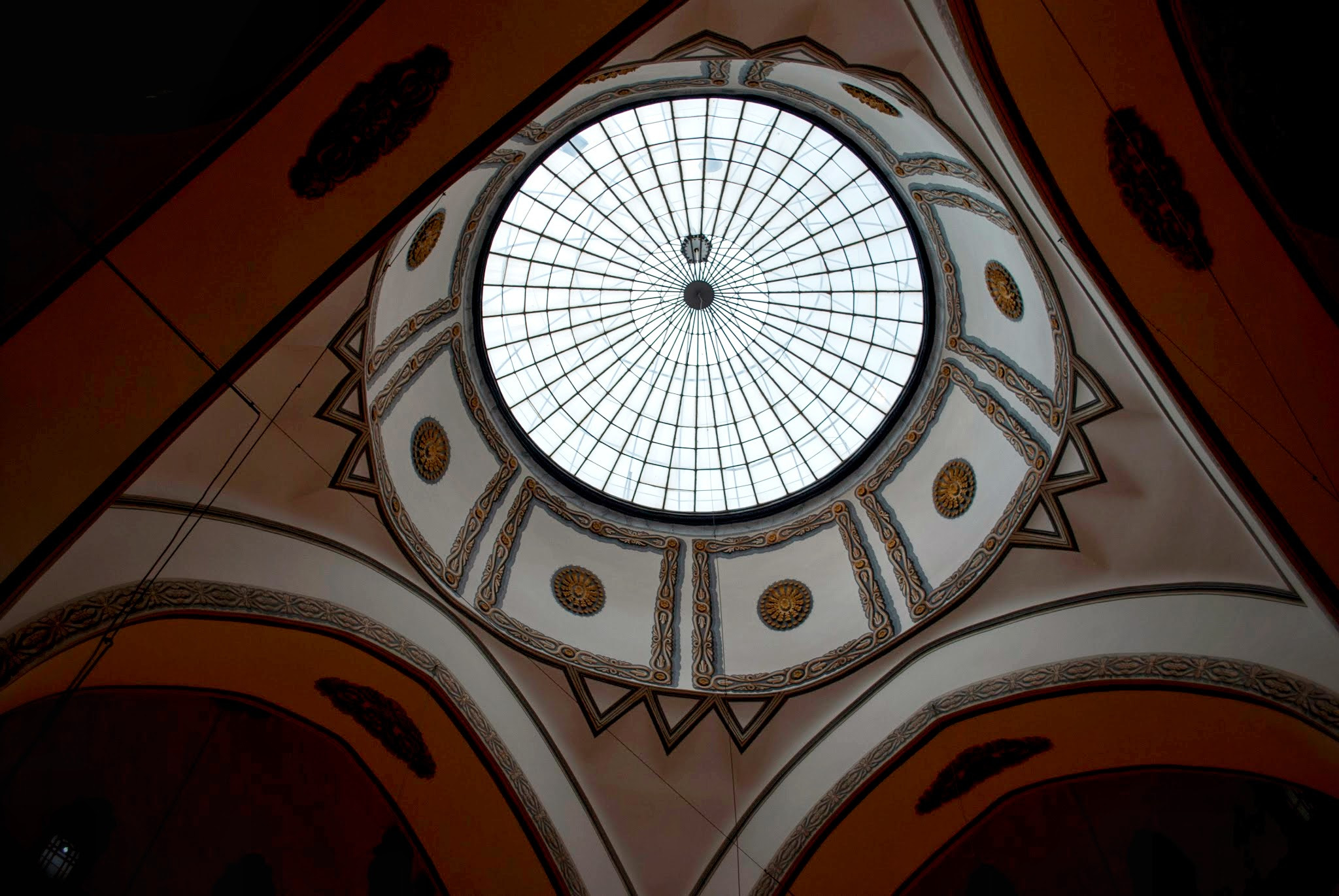
The skylight over the fountain of the mosque

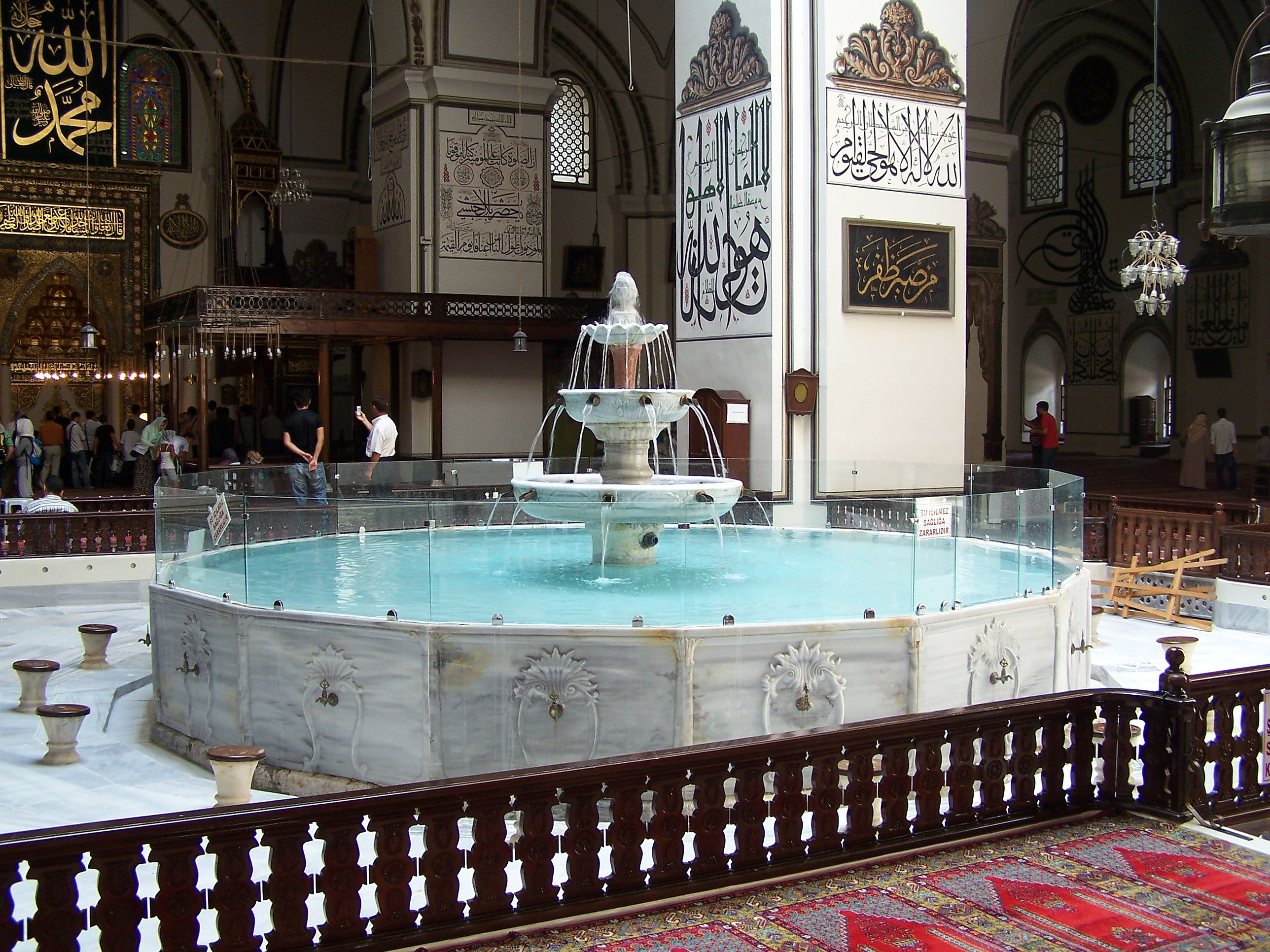
The interior şadırvan

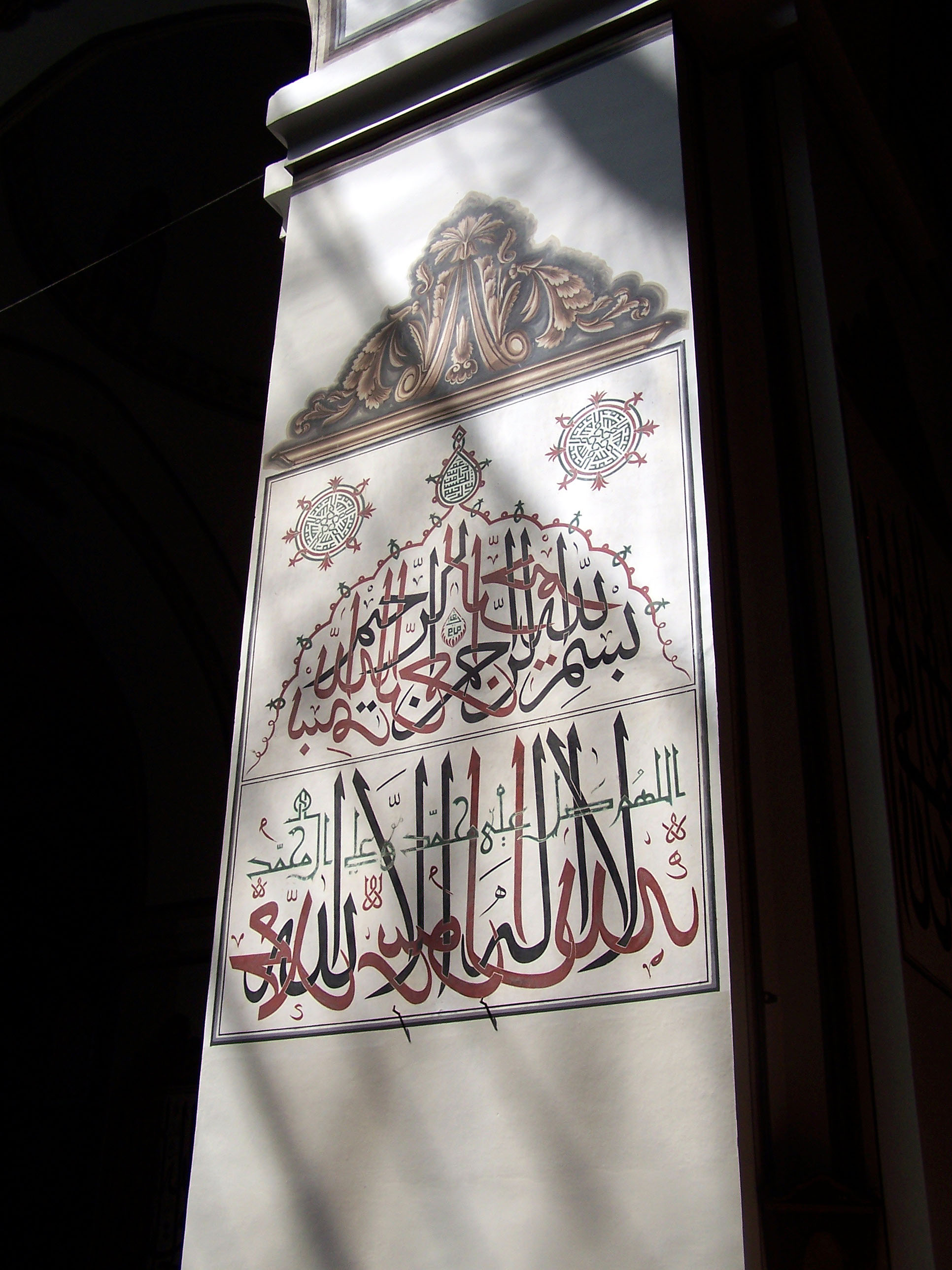
Calligraphy on the walls

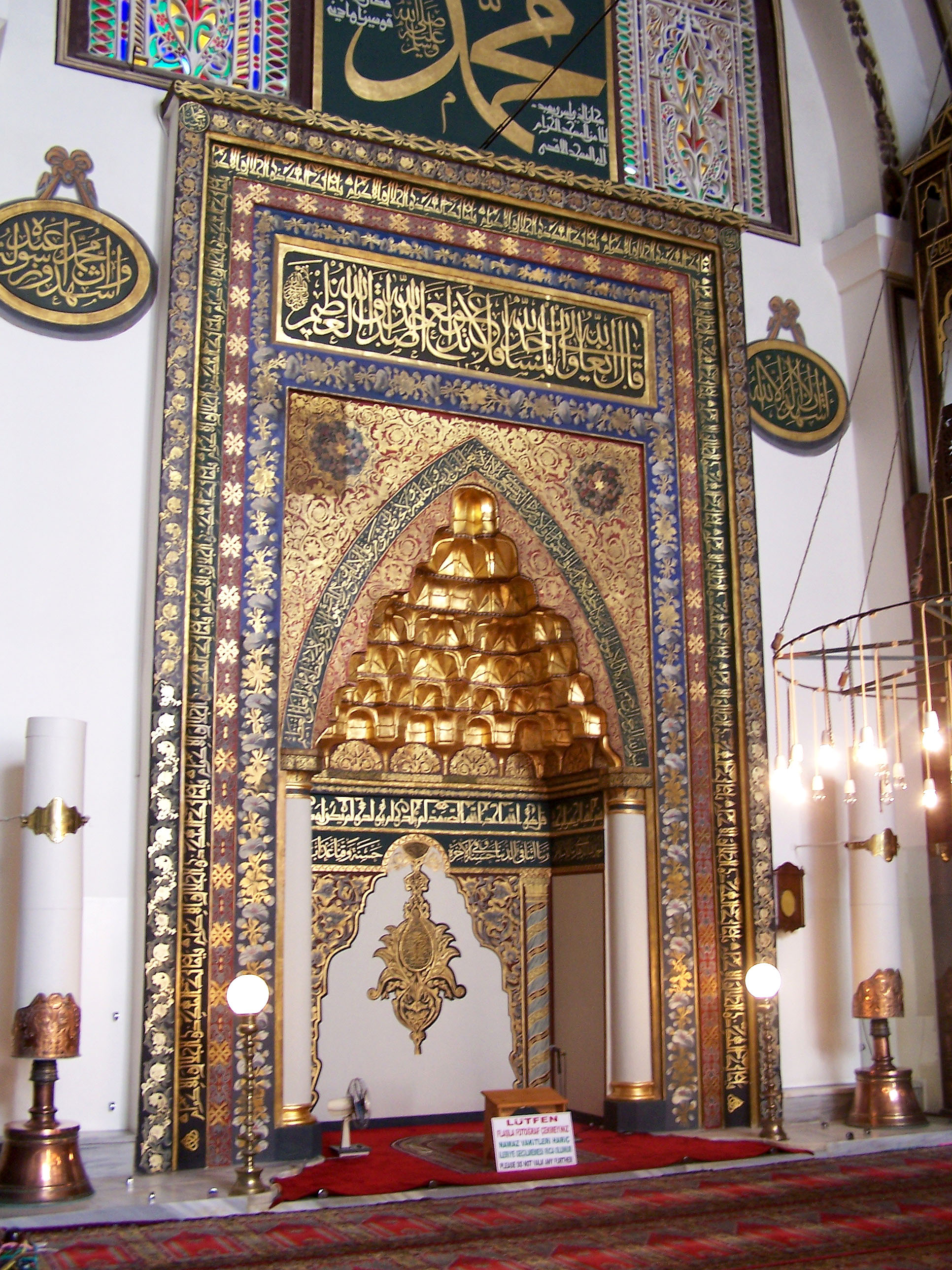
The mihrab

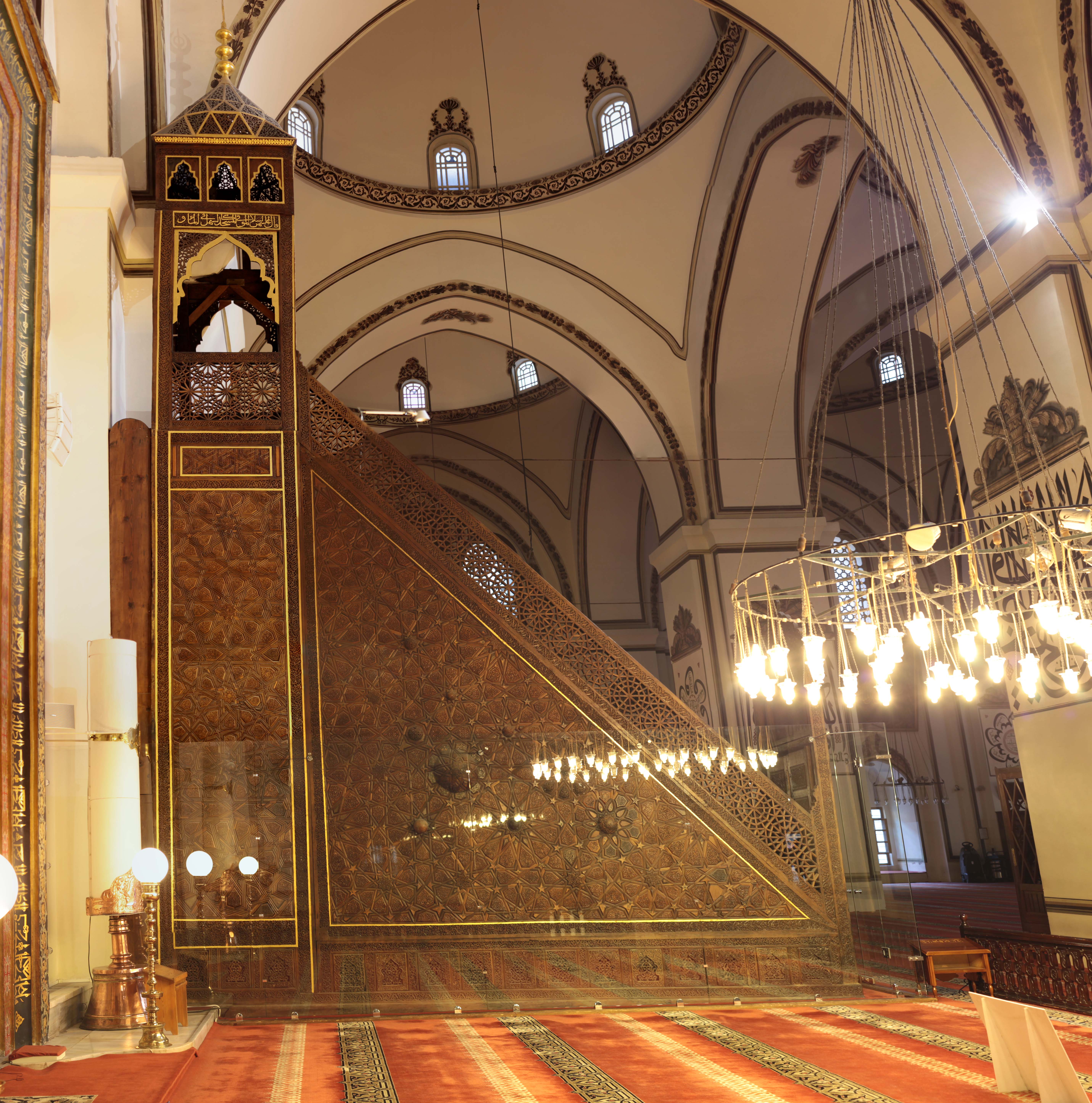
The minbar

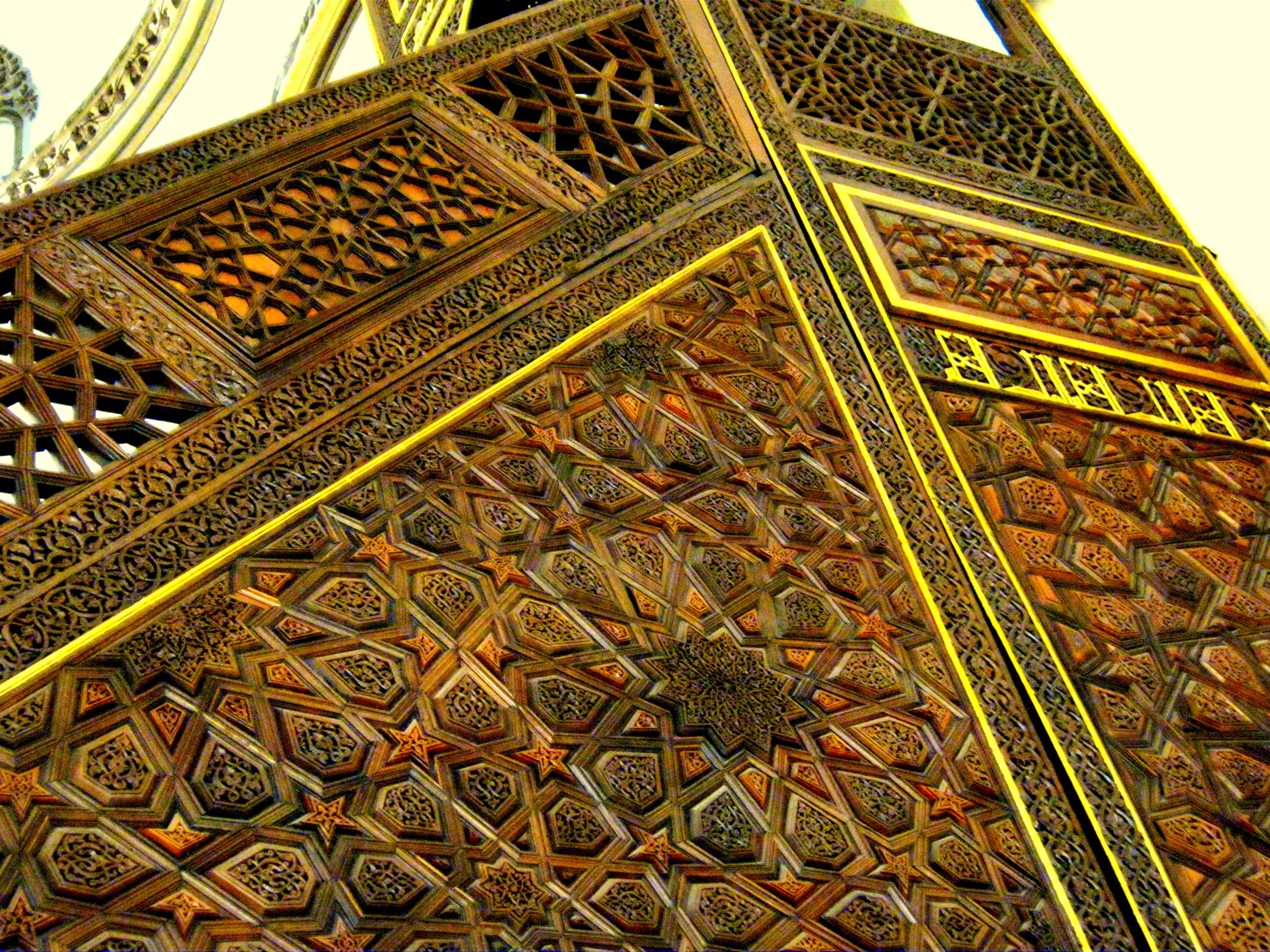
The decoration of the minbar

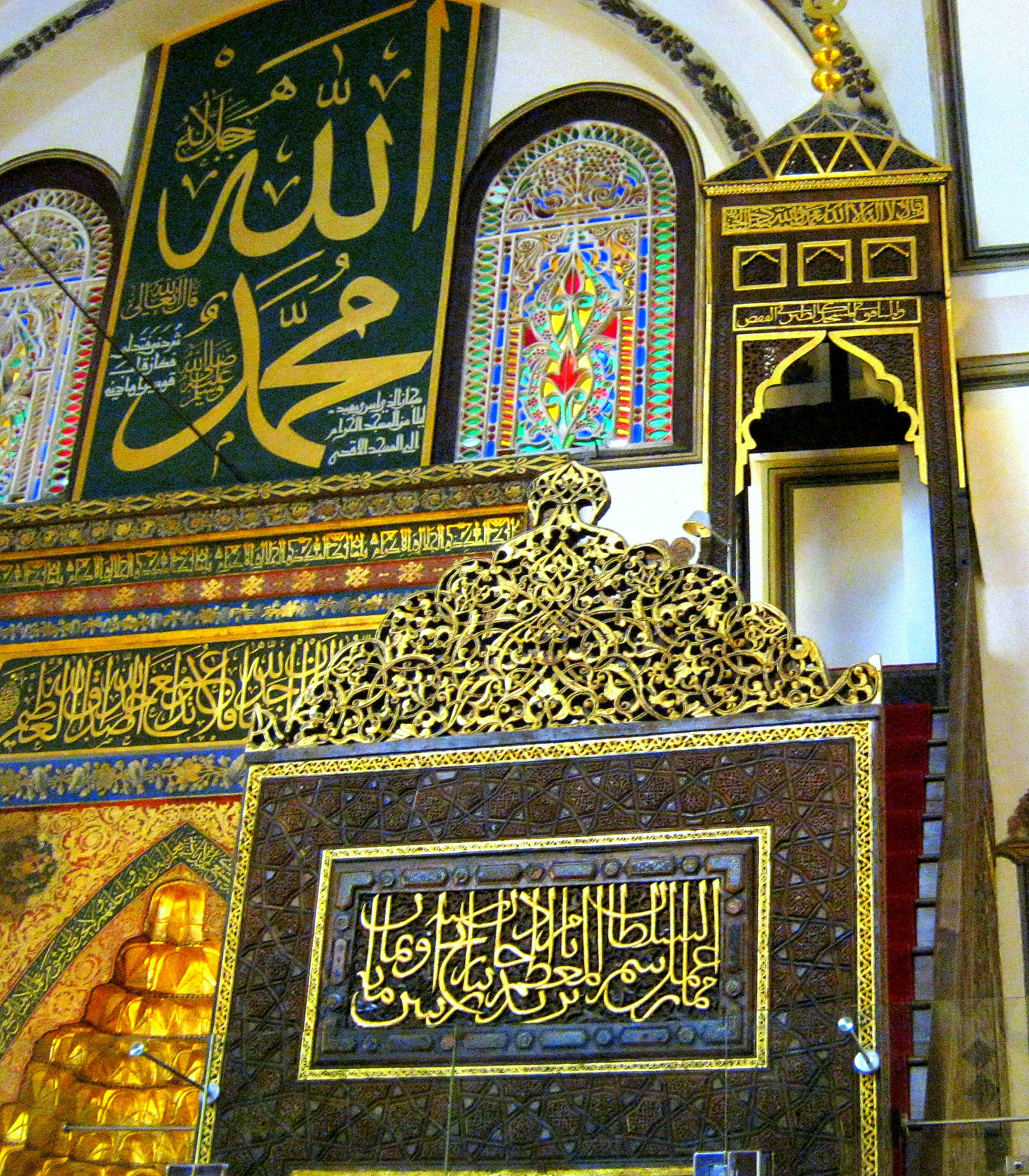
Details of the upper parts of the minbar and mihrab
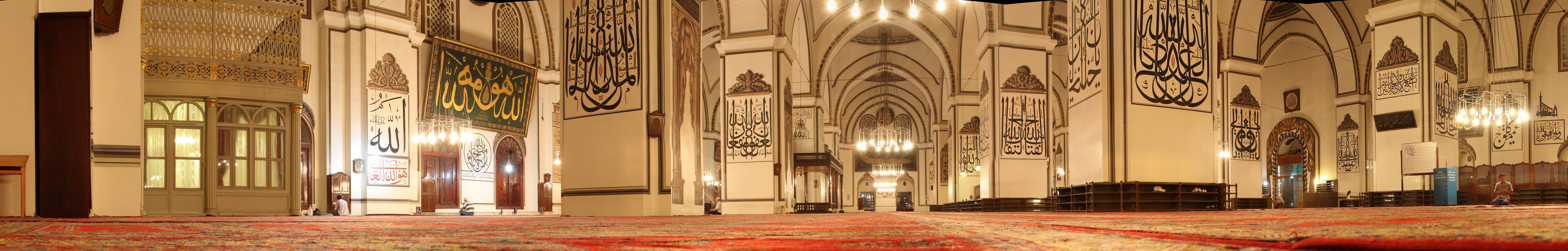
Panoramic interior view of the mosque, August 2009

== See also ==
- List of Turkish Grand Mosques
