= February 2016 Ankara bombing =

Bombing in Turkey by Kurdish separatists

- Part of Kurdish–Turkish conflict (2015–present)
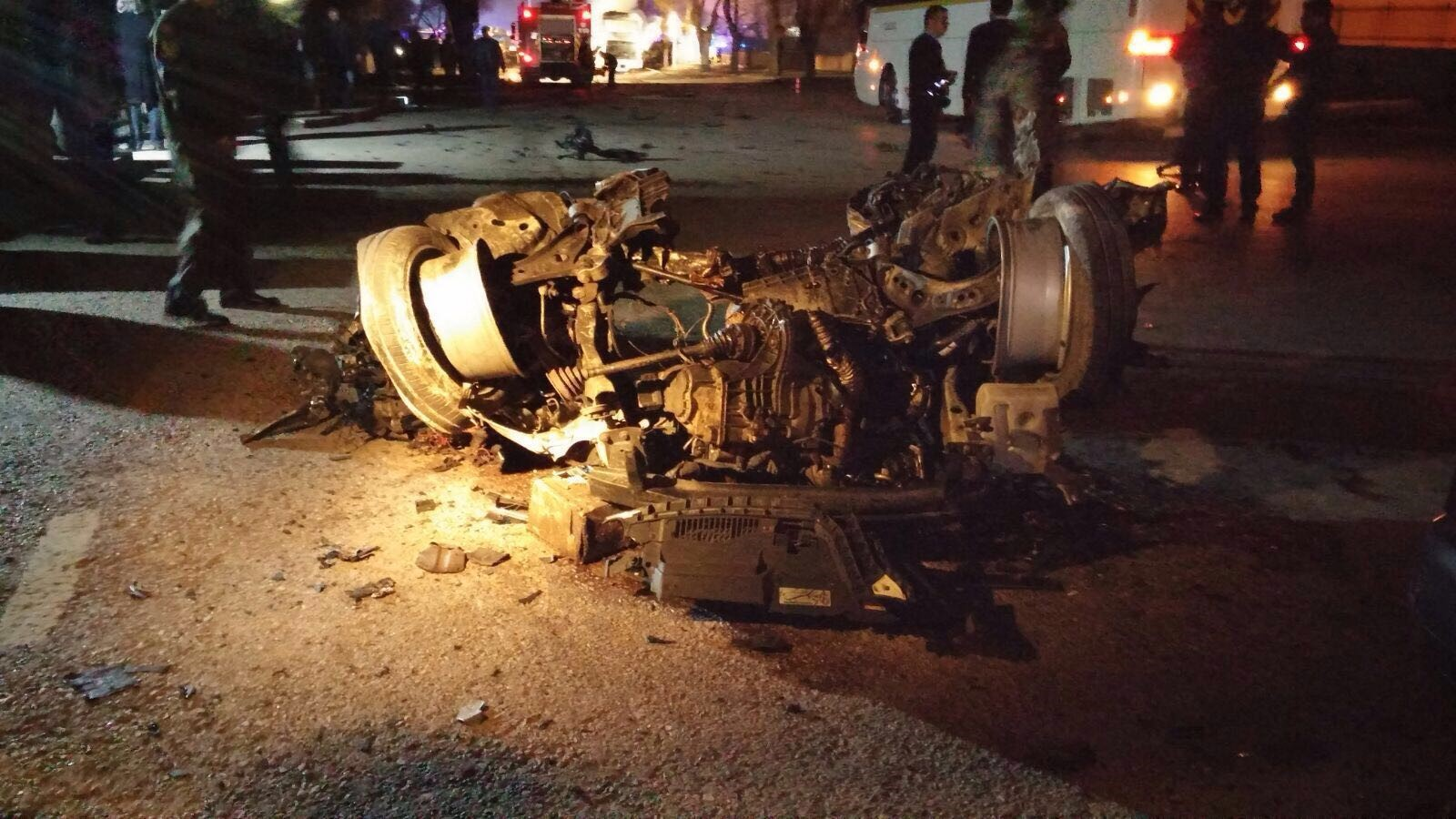
- Location: 39.9154°N 32.8406°E; Ankara, Turkey
- Date: 17 February 2016; 18:31 (UTC+2)
- Target: Military personnel
- Attack type: Car bombing, suicide bombing
- Deaths: 14 civilian employees of Turkish Armed Forces; 14 soldiers 1 civilian 1 perpetrator Total: 30
- Injuries: 60
- Perpetrators: Abdulbaki Sömer; Kurdistan Freedom Hawks
- Motive: Anti-Turkish

The February 2016 Ankara bombing killed at least 30 people and injured 60 in the capital of Turkey. According to Turkish authorities, the attack targeted a convoy of vehicles carrying both civilian and military personnel working at the military headquarters during the evening rush hour as the vehicles were stopped at traffic lights at an intersection with İsmet İnönü Boulevard close to Kızılay neighborhood. Several ministries, the headquarters of the army and the Turkish Parliament are located in the neighbourhood where the attack occurred. The Kurdistan Freedom Hawks (TAK) took responsibility for the attack and said they targeted security forces. Censorship monitoring organization Turkey Blocks reported nationwide internet restrictions beginning approximately one hour after the blast pursuant to an administrative order. The attack killed 14 military personnel, 14 civilian employees of the military, and a civilian (as well as the perpetrator).

== Background ==
In October 2015, a bombing at a peace rally in Ankara against a crackdown on Kurds in the country amidst the renewed PKK rebellion following a breakdown of the ceasefire killed over 100 people. On 13 February, Turkish shelling of Kurdish positions in response to "incoming Kurdish fire" and against the backdrop of YPG territorial gains in northern Syria led, at the request of Russia, to a UN briefing in which the president of the United Nations Security Council Rafael Carreno said that all members during the closed-door meeting expressed their concern at Turkey's actions and called on the country to "comply with international law".

Following the UNSC vote and just hours before the bombing, Turkey's President, Recep Tayyip Erdoğan, referred to PYD as a "terrorist organisation" akin to the Kurdistan Workers' Party (PKK), Islamic State of Iraq and the Levant (ISIL), DHKP-C and Al-Nusra Front and stressed that the attacks against PYD's armed wing, YPG, will continue until it stops alleged threats against Turkey's national security.

== Bombings ==
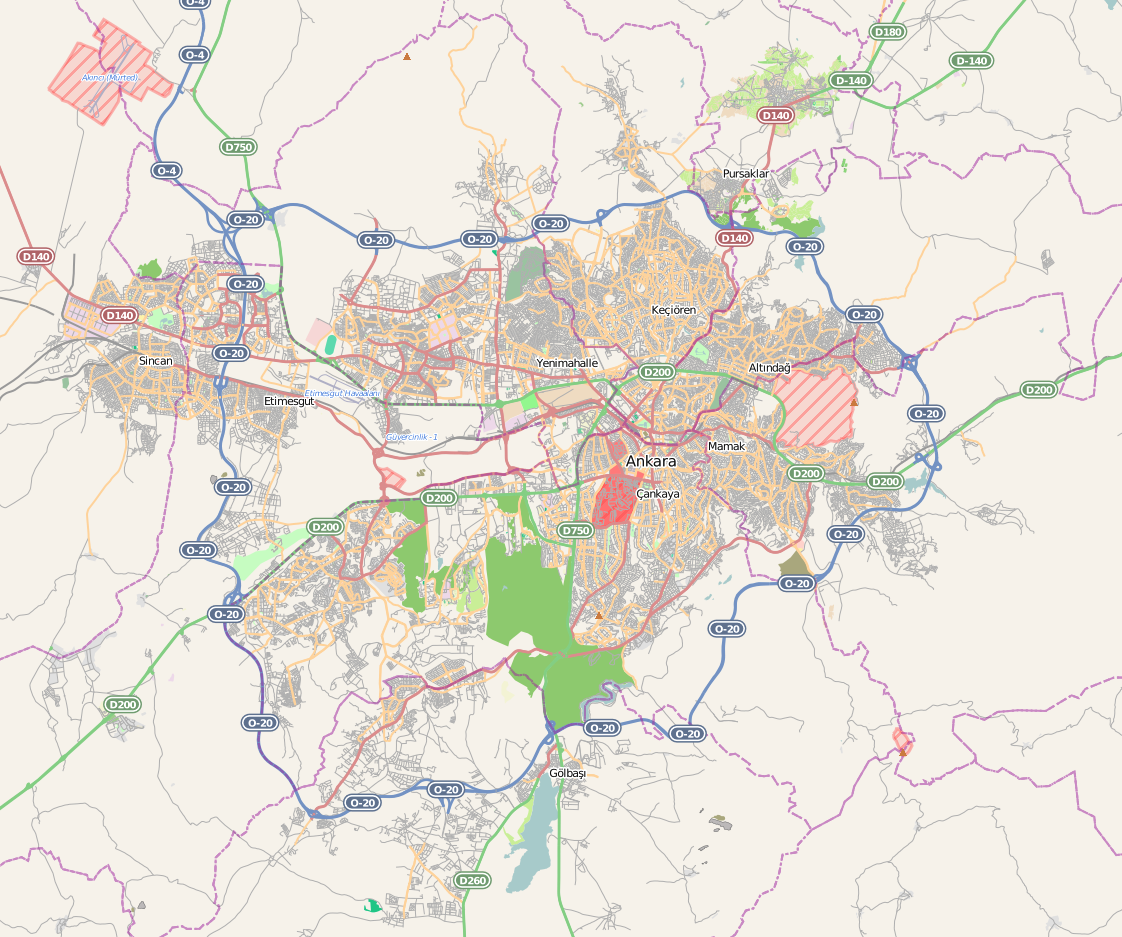
Merasim Street

A car bomb detonated at 18:31 local time, while army buses carrying military personnel were waiting at traffic lights. The attack site was next to a residential block for high-ranking military personnel. Some Turkish news channels showed images of a raging fire that engulfed military vehicles after the explosion, heard several kilometres away.

== Casualties ==
At least 30 people, including the perpetrator, died and 60 were injured as a result of the blast. The initial dead included the perpetrator, 12 soldiers, 16 civilian employees of the military and a journalist. Another civilian died from his wounds in hospital on 23 February 2016. A list of the first dead was published on 18 February.

== Assailant ==
Initially, Turkish government declared the name of assailant as Salih Necar, a Syrian Kurd who was trained by YPG, PKK and Syrian government. Kurdistan Freedom Hawks (TAK) claimed responsibility and named the suicide bomber as Abdülbaki Sönmez and released a photo of him, which was later claimed to be an edited image of a Turkish blogger.

Later, DNA reports confirmed that perpetrator was Turkish-born Abdulbaki Sönmez, not Syrian-born Salih Necar who was shown as perpetrator to the world by Turkish prime minister Ahmet Davutoglu. Also, Syrian Kurdish authorities announced that a person named Salih Necar from Hasakah doesn't exist.

After DNA reports Deputy Prime Minister of Turkey Numan Kurtulmuş said that "the name of the perpetrator may be different but it does not change the reality of this matter. This person has entered Turkey from the PYD region and there is record of him assuming the given identity.". Turkish government is claiming that YPG, taking orders from PKK, is responsible from the massacre, and TAK is used as a way to "exonerate" the YPG. Turkish government is also worried about NATO allies of support of YPG, prime minister Davutoğlu said “We cannot excuse any NATO ally, including the US, of having links with a terrorist organisation [YPG] that strikes us in the heart of Turkey”.

Turkish authorities claimed that the perpetrator was trained as a suicide bomber in Syrian Rojava by YPG and entered Turkey as a refugee. Turkey claims that the attack was planned by the YPG, PKK, PYD and the Syrian government.

The suicide bomber was eventually confirmed as Abdülbaki Sönmez, a citizen of Turkey.

== Reactions ==
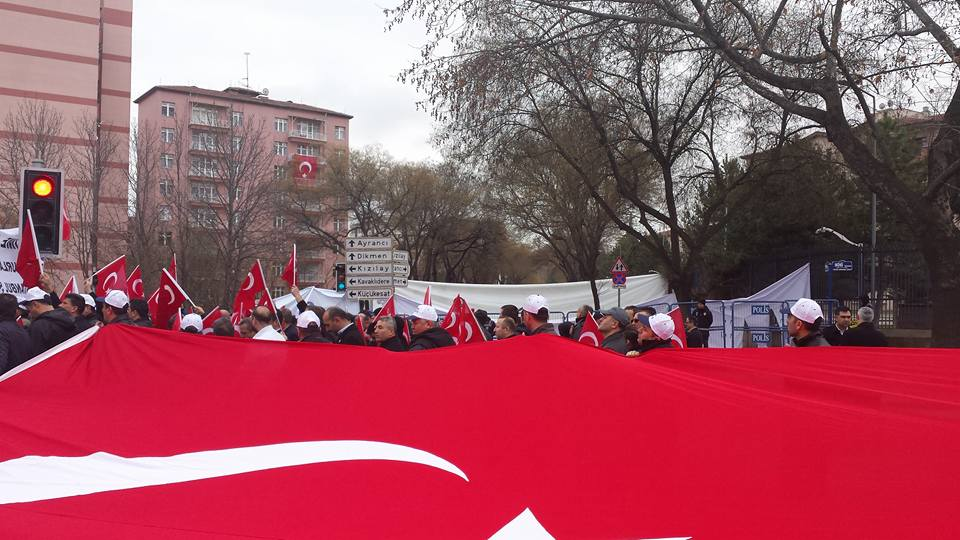
Thousands at protests all over Turkey

=== Domestic ===
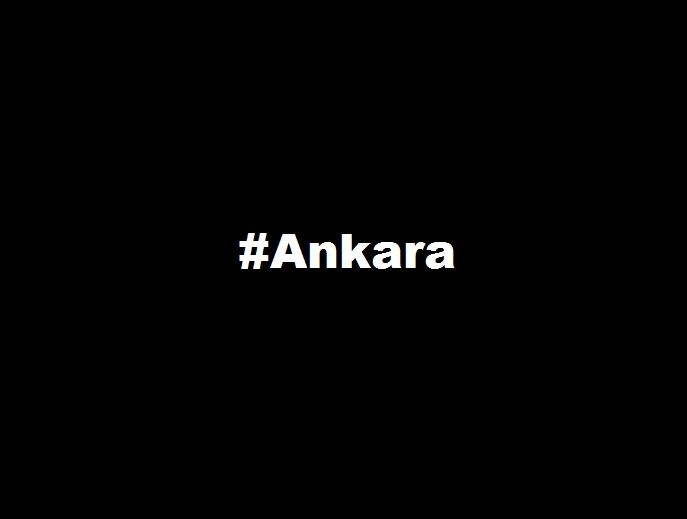
Attack shared by social media users post pictures

President Recep Tayyip Erdoğan issued a statement. Prime Minister Ahmet Davutoğlu cancelled planned trips to Belgium and Azerbaijan following the attack. Spokesman for the ruling Justice and Development Party Ömer Çelik said he condemned the attacks. Erdogan vowed retaliation against the perpetrators of the attack while Deputy Prime Minister Numan Kurtulmuş called it an attack on the "nation as a whole".

Oppositional Peoples' Democratic Party (HDP) co-leader Selahattin Demirtaş condemned the bombing as a "merciless attack" and wished "God’s mercy upon those who lost their lives". The Turkish Parliament failed to make a unanimous declaration. The pro-Kurdish and pro-minority HDP party condemned the bombing, with parliamentary chair İdris Baluken referring to it as a "loathsome attack"; the party disagreed with the unilaterally drafted text. The declaration was finally released by the ruling Justice and Development Party (AKP), and opposition CHP and MHP parties.

=== International ===
An EU summit in Brussels that was to focus on the issues of migrants was cancelled following the bombing. World leaders, including those from Germany, the United Kingdom and United States condemned the attack. In a joint statement, the EU's High Representative for Foreign Affairs Federica Mogherini and European Enlargement Commissioner Johannes Hahn, termed the bombing "a terrible attack". NATO Secretary-General Jens Stoltenberg condemned the attack.

=== States ===
- Finland: Prime Minister Juha Sipilä stated "We strongly condemn the terrorist attack in Ankara, Turkey. Our condolences to the families and friends of the victims." on Twitter.
- Germany: Chancellor Angela Merkel said in a statement "I'm telling the Turkish people: we as Germans are sharing your pain", adding that "In the battle against those responsible for these inhuman acts we are on the side of Turkey."
- Kosovo: President Atifete Jahjaga stated "Strongly condemn the heinous terrorist attack in #Ankara. Deepest condolences to families of victims and people of Turkey for the lost lives" on Twitter.
- United Kingdom: Richard Moore, British Ambassador to Turkey, offered his condolences through Twitter by stating that the "UK stands shoulder to shoulder with Turkey at this difficult time."
- United States: John Bass, the U.S. ambassador to Turkey, expressed his condolences through Twitter by stating that, "Our hearts and prayers go out to those affected."
- Ukraine: Prime Minister Arseniy Yatsenyuk stated that "The Ukrainian Government and all the people express condolences to families of those killed and injured in terroristic act in Ankara" on Twitter.
- Poland: President Andrzej Duda stated "My thoughts and prayers are dedicated these days to the Turkish people, especially the victims of the attack and their loved ones. Please accept, on behalf of the Polish Nation and myself, my deepest sympathies."

== See also ==
- 2015 Ankara bombings
- March 2016 Ankara bombing
- Cizre operation (2015)
- Kurds in Turkey
