= 2011 Ankara bombing =

Turkish terrorist attack

The 2011 Ankara bombing was a car bombing on September 20, 2011, that took place in Kizilay, Ankara, Turkey at 11:00 am. Three people were killed and 15 others were injured. One of the suspects was arrested on 1 May 2020. the suspect Ümit Akgümüş, was sentenced to 619 years and 6 months in prison, along with 6 aggravated life sentences.
