= Miller's Anatomy of the Dog =

1964 veterinary textbook

- Title page for Miller's Anatomy of the Dog (1979, 2nd edition)
- Author: Malcolm E. Miller; George C. Christensen; Howard E. Evans
- Language: English
- Subject: Veterinary science
- Genre: Non-fiction
- Publication date: 1960

Miller's Anatomy of the Dog is a veterinary textbook which was first published in 1964. It deals with the structure, organs and tissues of the dog. The fifth edition was published in 2020.

Malcolm E. Miller began work on the first edition of the textbook in 1946, having completed a thesis in 1940 entitled "The Dissection and Study of the Trunk of the Dog". Miller based each description and illustration in the book on at least five canine dissections. Miller died in 1960, and the first edition of The Anatomy of the Dog was published posthumously in 1964, with George C. Christensen and Howard E. Evans as co-authors. Evans and Christensen also co-authored the second edition, published in 1979, retitled as Miller's Anatomy of the Dog. This edition was translated into Japanese, and was described by the Canadian Veterinary Journal as being "... more than a manual. It will probably be regarded as a kind of Bible in its own field..."

Evans was the sole author of the third edition, which was published in 1993. The third edition was reviewed in the Journal of the American Veterinary Medical Association, and the Journal of Small Animal Practice.

The fourth edition, published in 2012, was the first in full color. It had fewer pages than the third edition, due to a reduction in text and image size. Reviewers from the Canadian Veterinary Journal and the Journal of the American Veterinary Medical Association found this did not detract from the clarity of the information presented. The fourth edition was reviewed by several other specialty veterinary journals, including The Veterinary Journal, the Journal of Small Animal Practice, and the Australian Veterinary Journal. The fourth edition was noted by a specialist cat publication, the Journal of Feline Medicine and Surgery, to be a "solid and well-referenced work" despite its "deficiency" of lacking information about cats. This edition was revised by Evans, and co-authored by Alexander de Lahunta.

The fifth edition was published in 2020, and was described in a review in the Journal of the American Veterinary Medical Association as remaining "the most comprehensive textbook on the anatomy of the canine body." This edition was edited by de Lahunta, in conjunction with John W. Hermanson.

== Editions ==
- Miller, Malcolm E.; Christensen, George C.; Evans, Howard E. (1964). Anatomy of the Dog. Illustrated by Newson, Marion E.; Barrow P. Philadelphia: W.B. Saunders Company. ISBN 978-0-7216-6360-9.
- Miller, Malcolm E.; George C., Christensen; Howard E., Evans (1979). Miller's Anatomy of the Dog (2nd ed.). Philadelphia: W.B. Saunders. ISBN 978-0-7216-3438-8.
- Evans, Howard E. (1993). Miller's Anatomy of the Dog (3rd ed.). Philadelphia: W.B. Saunders. ISBN 978-0-7216-3200-1.
- Evans, Howard E.; de Lahunta, Alexander (2013). Miller's Anatomy of the Dog (4th ed.). St. Louis, Missouri: Elsevier. ISBN 978-1-4377-0812-7.
- Hermanson, John W.; de Lahunta, Alexander (2020). Miller and Evans' Anatomy of the dog (5th ed.). St. Louis, Missouri: Saunders. ISBN 978-0-323-54601-0.
