= Feral cats in Istanbul =

Large population of feral cats in the Turkish city

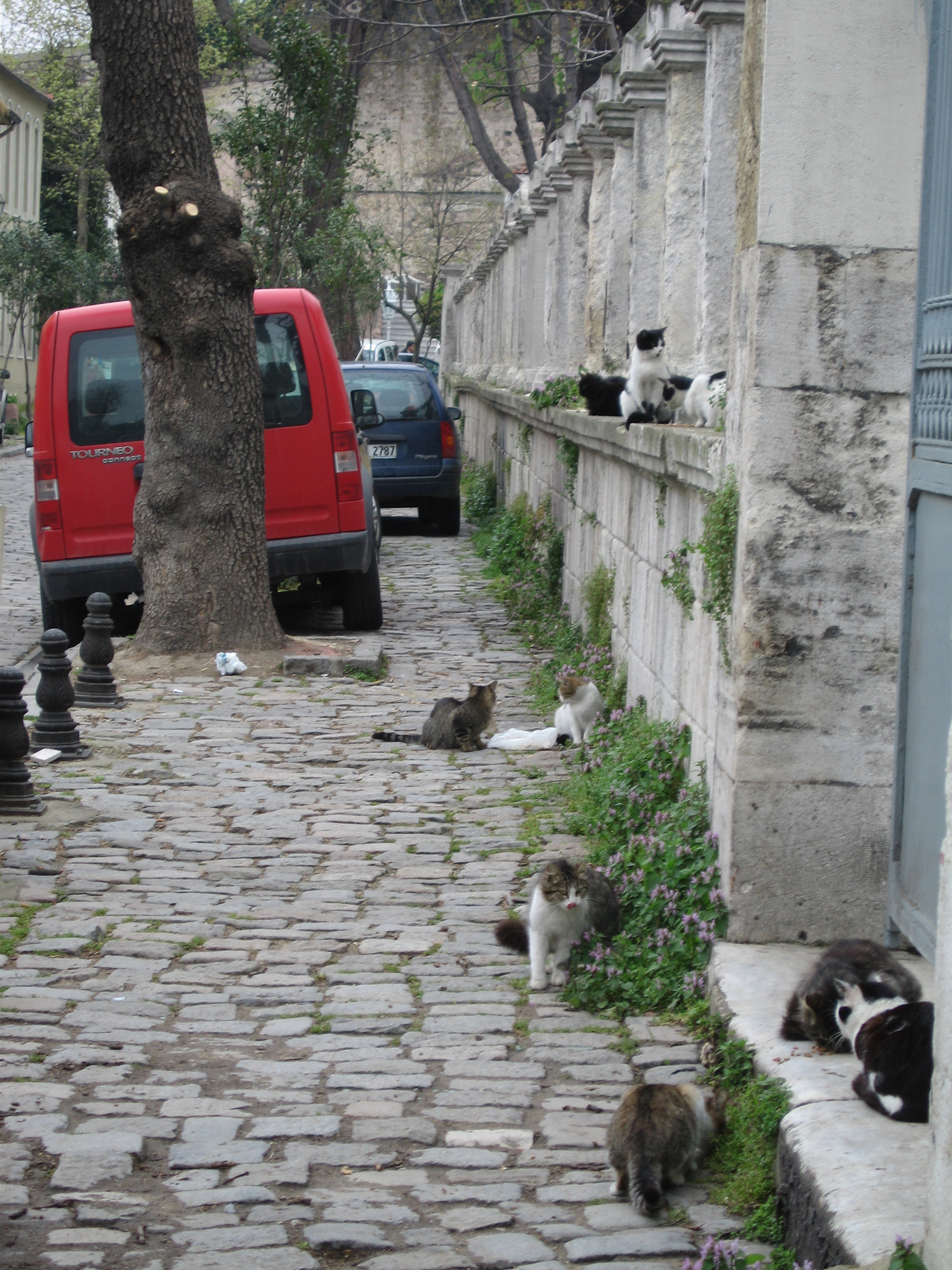
A group of feral cats in Istanbul, 2006

The Turkish city of Istanbul hosts a sizeable feral cat (Turkish: sokak kedisi, "street cat") population, with estimates ranging from a hundred thousand to over a million stray cats. Many Turkish citizens view street animals as communally owned pets rather than traditional strays, and the country has a blanket no-kill, no-capture policy.

== History ==
According to Fatih Dağlı, co-founder of the Cat Museum Istanbul, many cats arrived in the city on trading ships trading in Phoenician times, where they were used to keep the rodent populations down. Later, as the spice and silk trades grew in the Roman and Ottoman eras, more cats arrived in ships.

During the Ottoman period, the close proximity of houses and unpaved streets created ideal conditions for rats to thrive. While some continuity can be assumed between Byzantine Constantinople and Ottoman Istanbul, the denser housing and fewer restrictions on urban development in the Ottoman era led to a major increase in rat populations. This made cats' presence a necessity in the city. Marcel Heijnen, photographer and author of City Cats of Istanbul, says that the love of the stray cats led to the creation of a full-time profession – that of the mancacı ("cat sitter"). Mancacıs ensured that the city's cats were fed, and residents could choose to purchase food from them and feed the cats themselves.

There is a positive attitude towards cats in Islam, the religion brought by the Ottomans, which remains the most prevalent faith in the country.

=== Massacres of cats in Istanbul ===
In the 1830s, fears of animals in Ottoman Istanbul "culminated in mass slaughter or deportation campaigns of cats and dogs in the first decades of the nineteenth century". The Ottoman authorities organized mass slaughters of cats, as well as dogs. Robert Walsh, who visited the city during the massacres of cats, wrote that a "general crusade" was waged by the Turks against the cats "who were shot without mercy through the house and garden".

During the presidency of Mustafa Kemal Atatürk, the Istanbul Municipality carried out campaigns to capture and kill stray cats based on the belief that they could spread typhoid fever. Since the late 1920s, municipal workers used poisonous food, often laced with rat poison or paralytic drugs, as part of these operations. A Turkish newspaper in 25 July 1937 wrote that, in a few days, 341 cats were caught in Beyoğlu in one day, and 1,087 cats had been killed there within four days. Countless cats were killed in Istanbul between the late 1920s and early 1940s, with over 15,000 cats killed alone between 1940 and 1941.

These campaigns were opposed by several doctors and professors, including Akil Muhtar Özden, who argued that cats could not transmit typhoid fever to humans and warned that killing stray cats could increase the rat population, potentially leading to the spread of more dangerous diseases.

In 1996, Istanbul authorities orchestrated a vast extermination campaign where municipal workers indiscriminately killed many street dogs and cats in preparation for the UN Habitat II Convention.

== Health ==
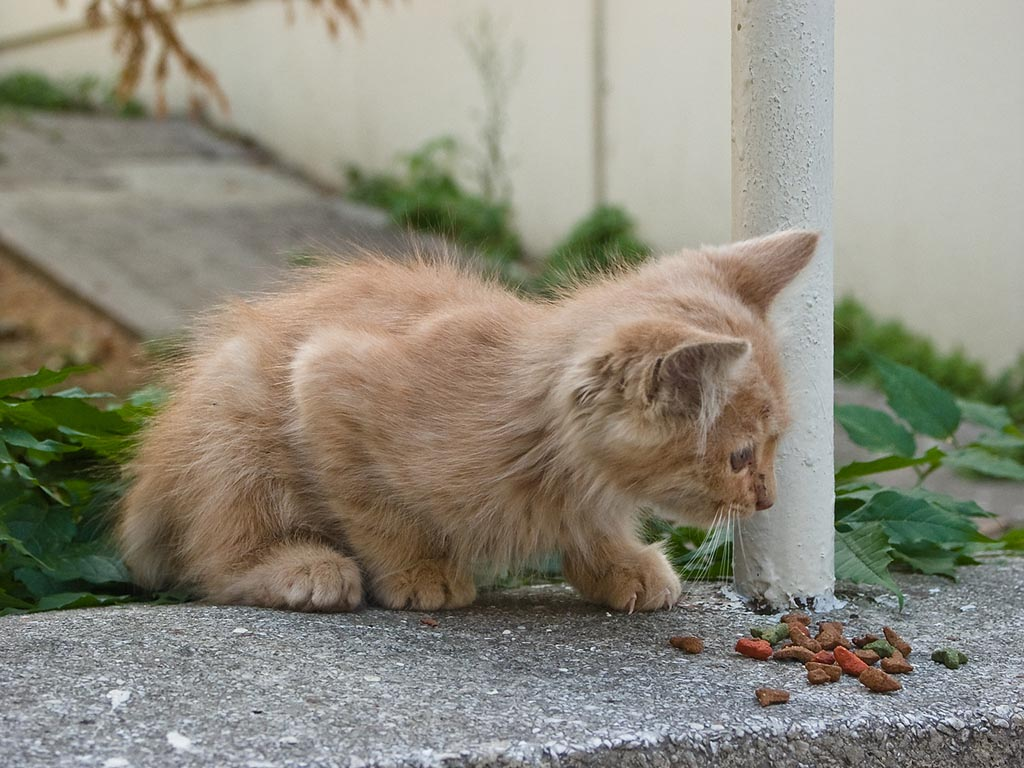
A kitten in Eminönü

A 2000 study in Journal of Feline Medicine and Surgery found feline immunodeficiency virus and feline leukemia virus common among outdoor and stray cats in Istanbul. Although stray cats can be a vector for rabies, out of all 21 rabies cases in Turkey documented between 2000 and 2014, none were through a contact between cats and humans. A 2011 Turkish study of strays in Istanbul found that 4.65% of the examined cats had Joyeuxiella pasqualei infections.

A 2015 paper published by Rutgers University academics stated that collective feeding leads to concentration of animals to a specific area, which in turn facilitates the transmission of certain diseases. Healthy cats' contact with objects such as food and water containers contaminated by sick animals can occur as a result.

A 2015 study conducted by faculty of Istanbul University-Cerrahpaşa found that, among 316 stray cats in Istanbul, 1.8% had anaplasma/Ehrlichia/Bartonella, 3.4% had hepatozoon, and .3% had Toxoplasma gondii.

Each local council has a veterinary department to serve the cats in their area, which also offers a free neutering service. Private clinics offer treatment for street cats at reduced fees, and residents often share the cost of the bills.

== Public image ==
Cats in Istanbul have been used in Turkish public diplomacy and social media posts to promote a more positive image of Turkey internationally. They are often used to project Turkey's soft power, with some politicians instrumentalizing images of cats in their social media as a form of digital propaganda.

== Law ==
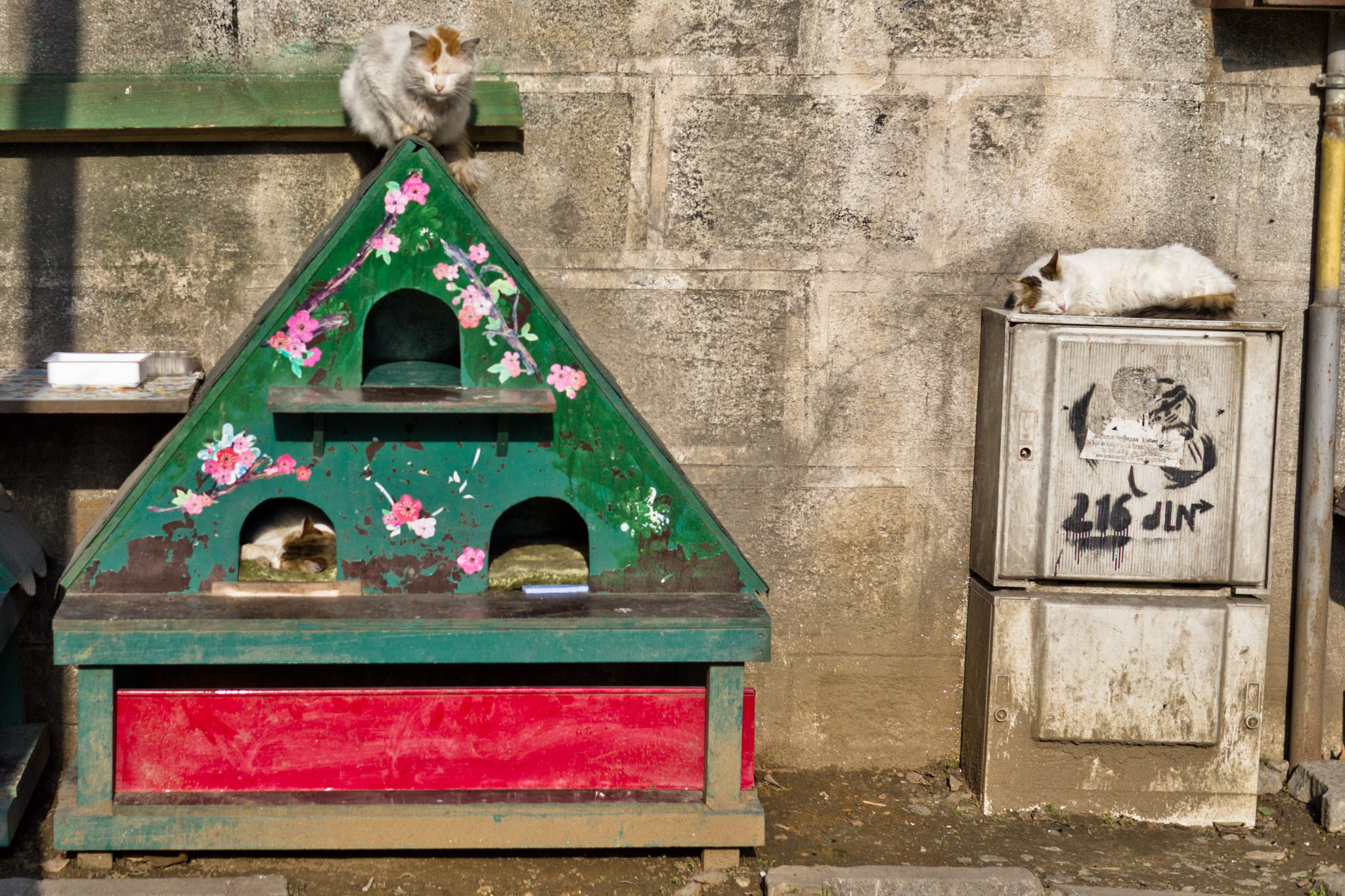
Street cats sleeping in Cihangir.

Before 2021, the Turkish law defined animals (strays and pets) as "commodities", rather than "living beings". This classification was criticized by animal rights activists, as it led to perceived lenient penalties against animal cruelty. According to the proposition that was accepted in 2021, pets and stray animals were given "living being" status, which allows from six months up to four years jail sentences for crimes against animals. The law also mandates the sterilization of all stray animals in Turkey.

In 2021 a Japanese national was deported from Turkey after he admitted to killing and eating 5 stray cats in Küçükçekmece, which gained widespread outrage in both countries.

== Cat life in Istanbul ==
Approximately 125,000 stray cats are thought to live in Istanbul. When house cats are included, it is estimated that 200,000 cats live in Istanbul. Stray cats can be seen in many places in Istanbul, whether in university classrooms, on ferries, buses, or subway trains, with no one bothering them. This has led to the city being nicknamed "Catstanbul" by cat lovers around the world. Marcel Heijnen says that the cats are a kind of hybrid between strays and pets.

Generally, every street in Istanbul has cats that are familiar to locals. In these streets, tiny "cat houses" have been prepared for stray cats. Neighborhood residents place food and water containers in front of their houses to feed stray cats.The Municipality of Istanbul has placed vending machines for cats and dogs in many parts of the city; there are many cats around these vending machines. Citizens passing by put coins into these machines, ensuring that cats and dogs are fed.

== In popular culture and media ==
The critically acclaimed 2016 Turkish documentary film Kedi centers around several stray cats that live in the city.

Etsuko Shundo's 2015 children's book Searching for a Cat in Istanbul (Japanese: イスタンブルで猫さがし) is about the search for a stray Turkish Van cat by students attending the Istanbul Japanese School.

=== Notable cats ===
Tombili became internationally known due to a photograph that showed him reclining on the pavement, and after his death he was honored with a statue.

Gli (2004-2020) was born in and raised in the Hagia Sophia, gaining the attention of visiting tourists and being the subject of numerous posts on social media.

== Gallery ==
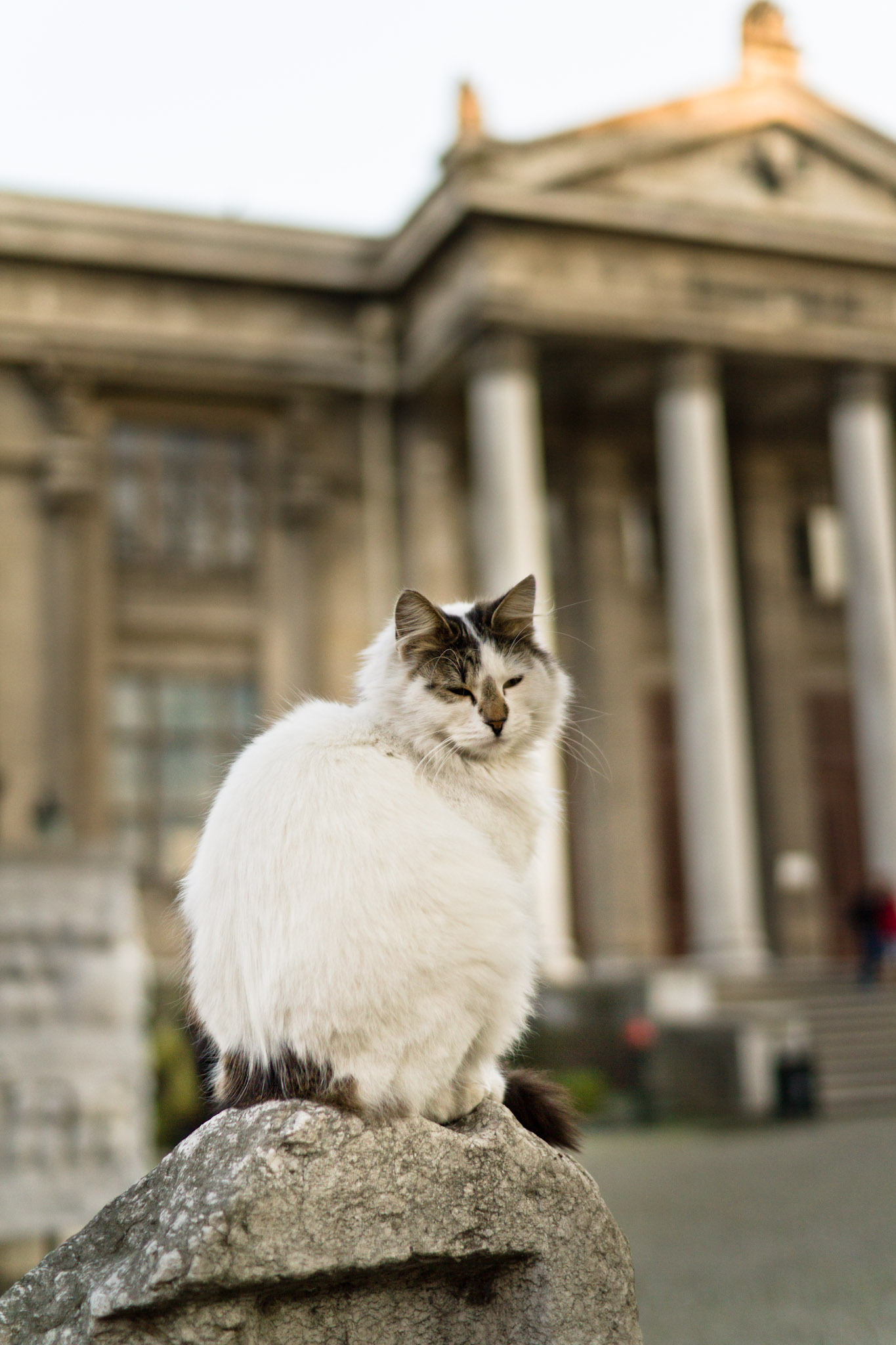
Street cat near Istanbul Archaeology Museums

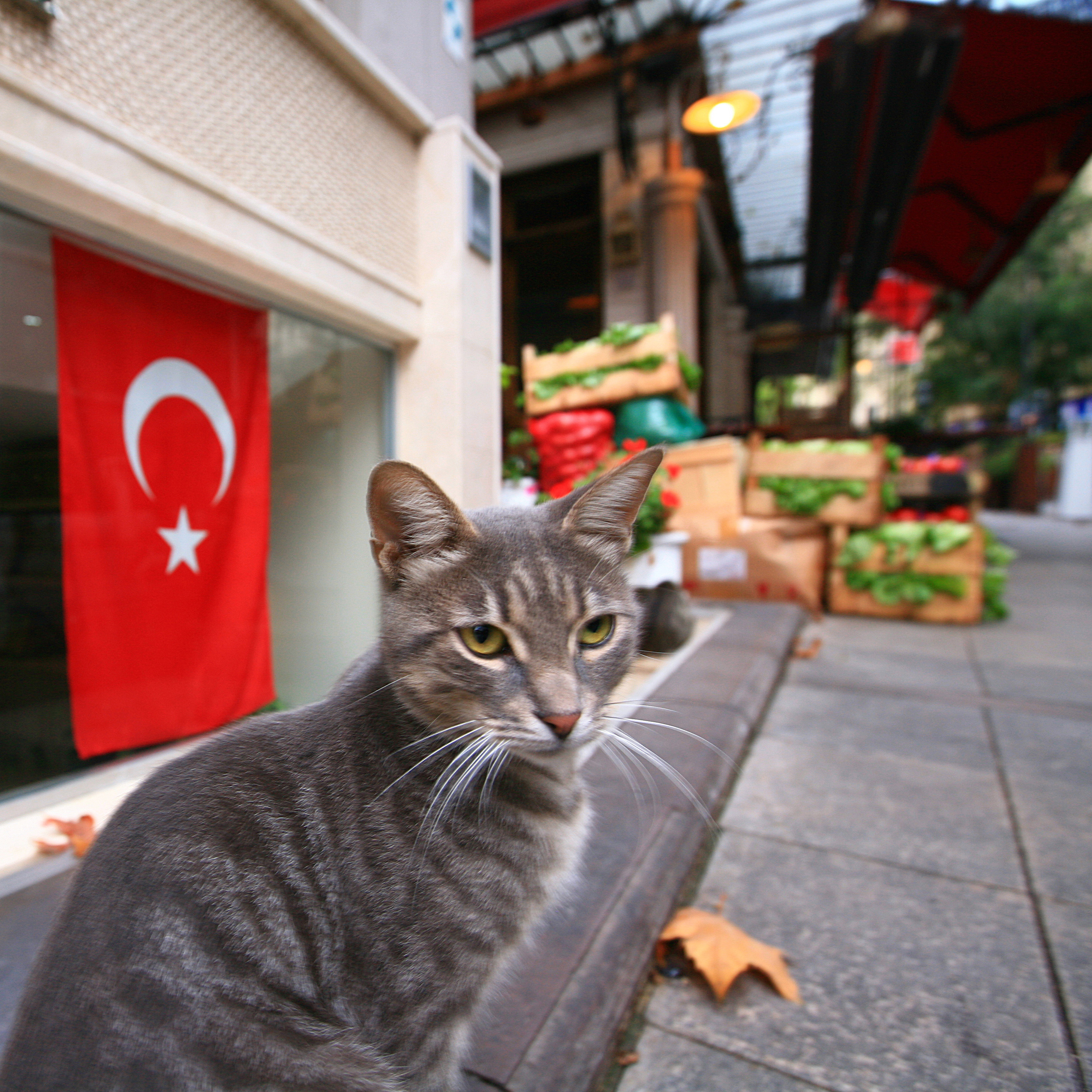
A tabby cat in Fatih, Flag of Turkey in the background

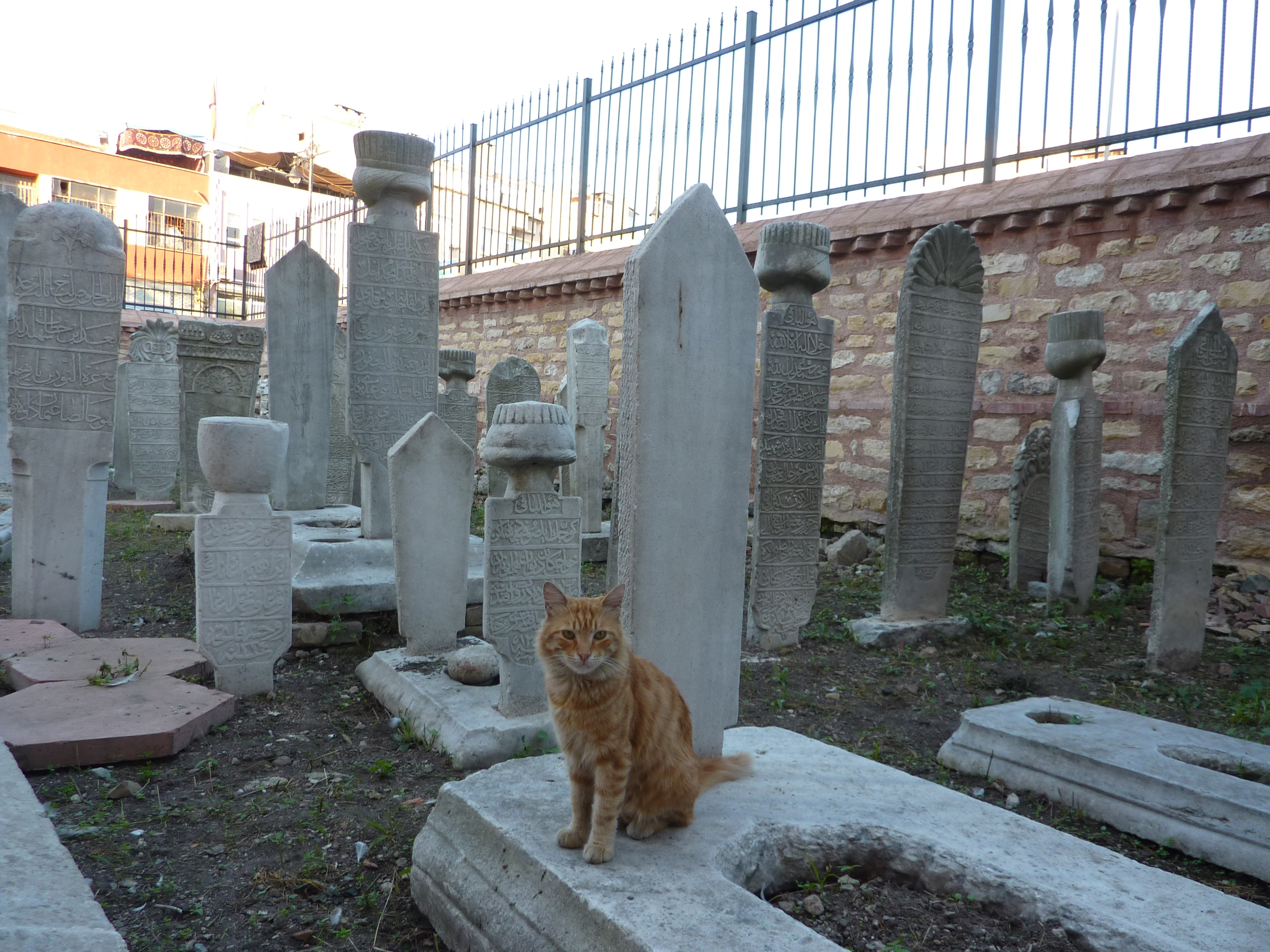
Ginger cat in Little Hagia Sophia cemetery

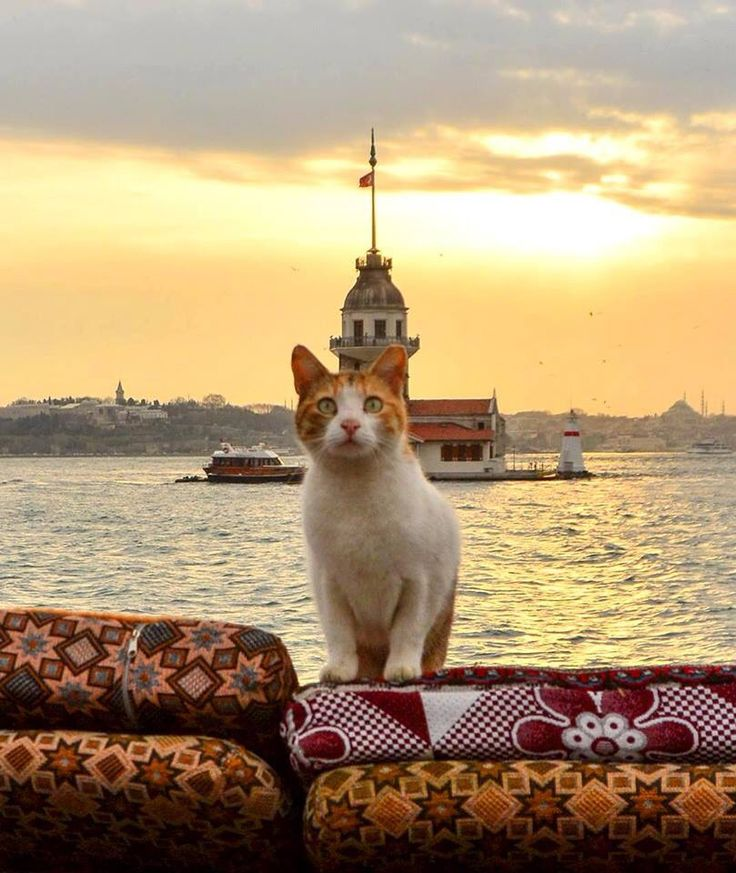
Tabby and white cat with Maiden's Tower in the background

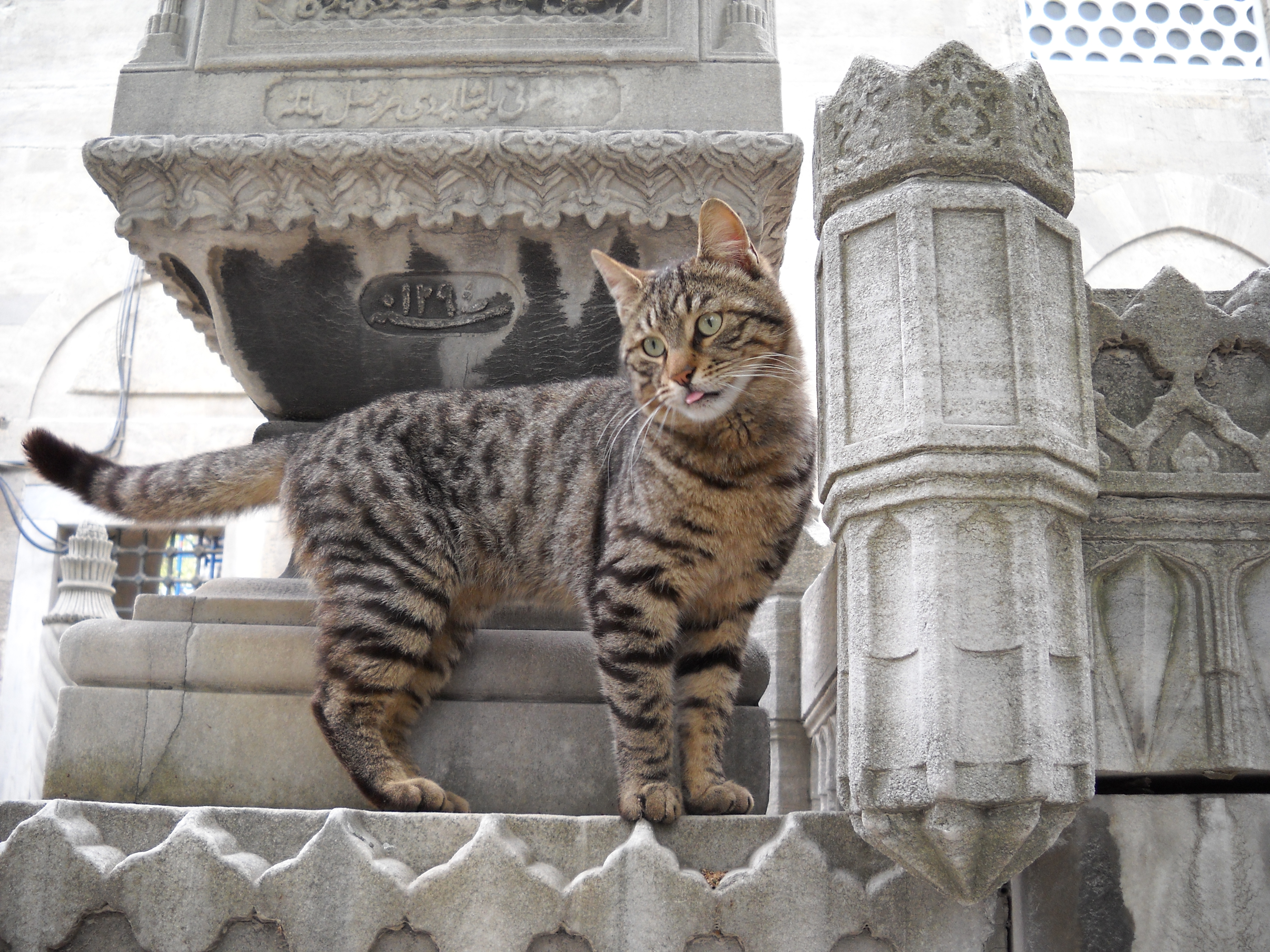
Cat in Süleymaniye Mosque cemetery

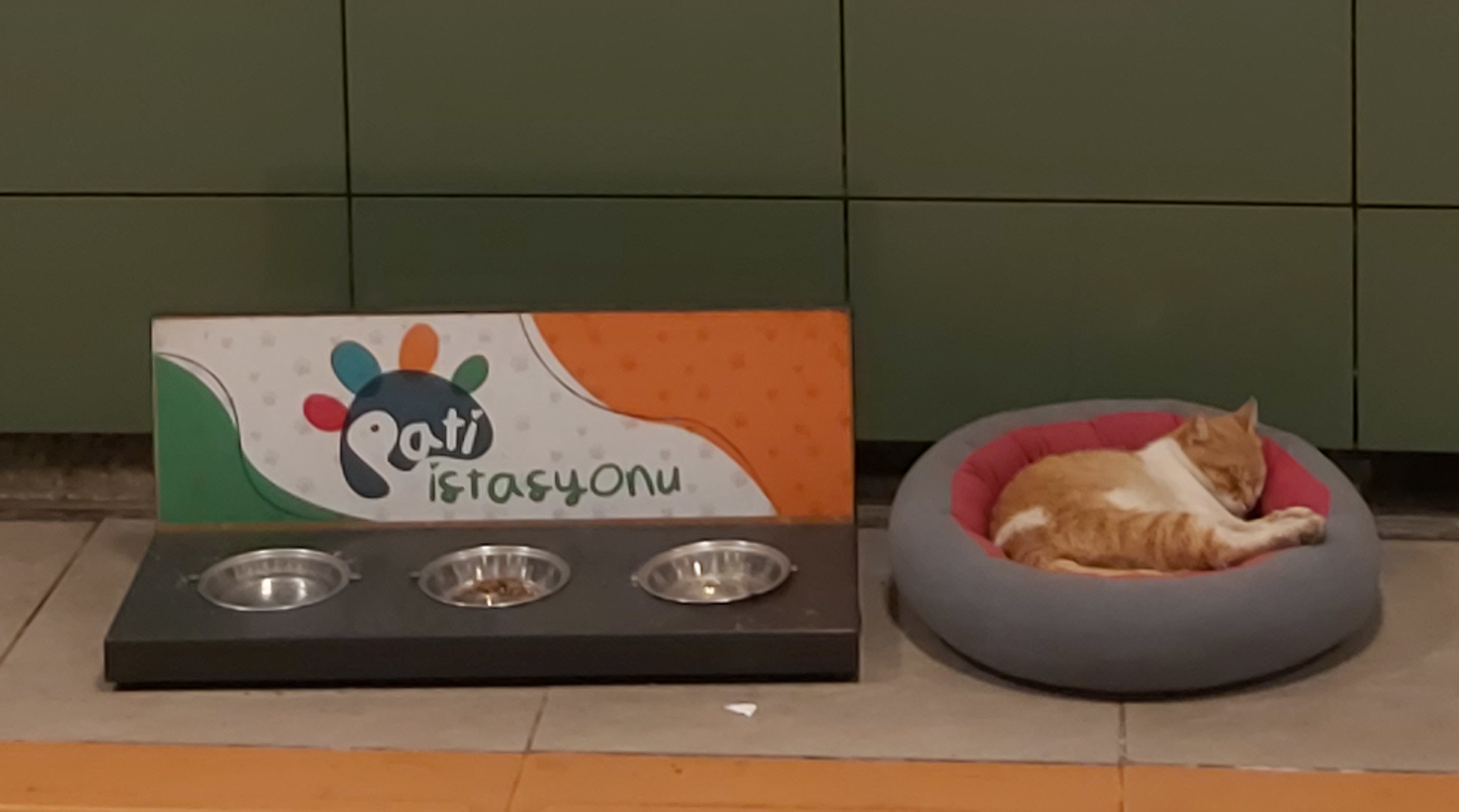
Cat resting at paw-station of Soğanlık metro station.

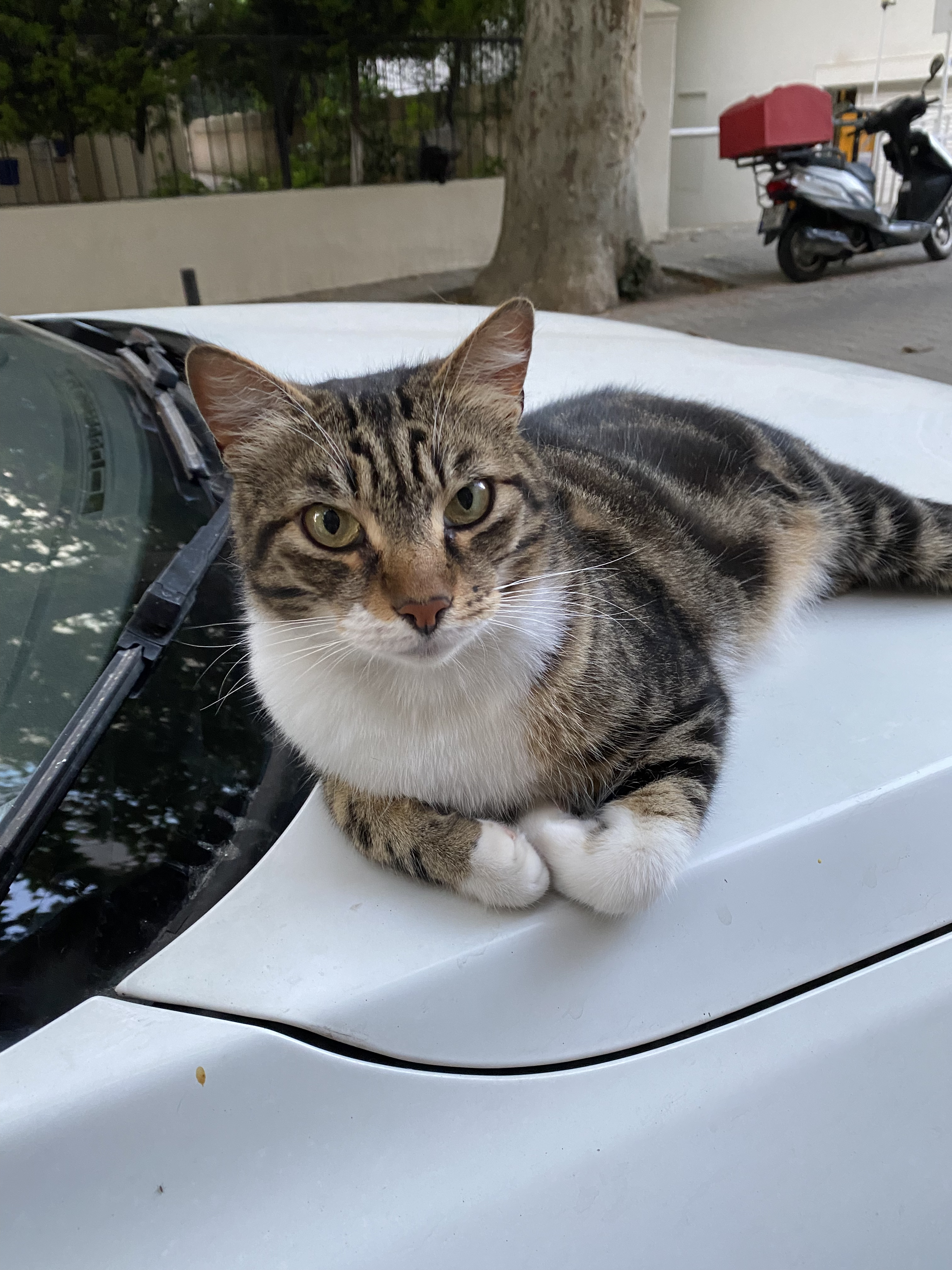
Cat in Kadıköy

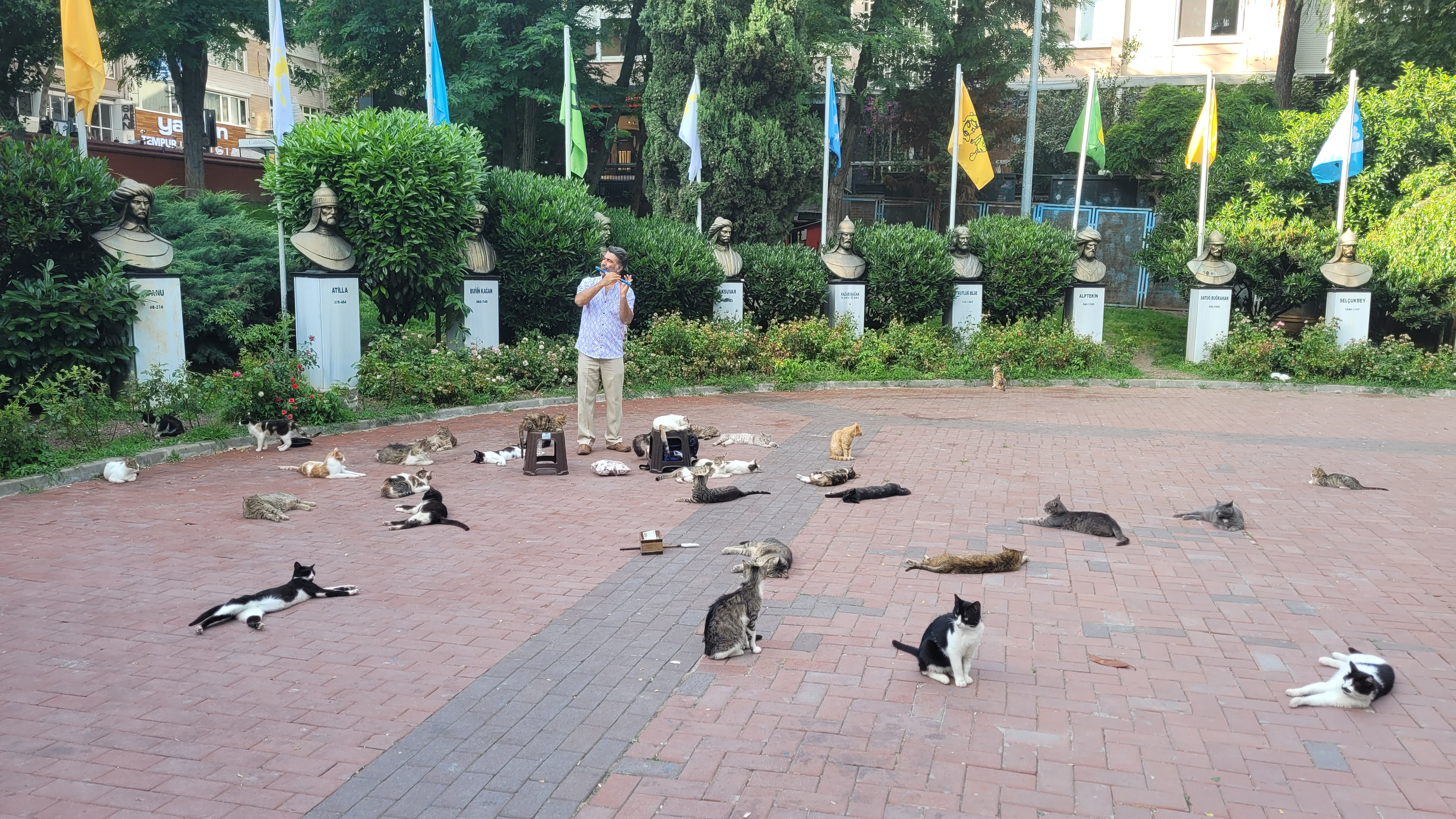
Feral cats at Maçka Park, Istanbul

== See also ==
- Tombili
- Gli
- Kedi (2016 film)
