= Beşiktaş Stadium =

Football stadium in Beşiktaş, Istanbul, Turkey

Tüpraş Stadyumu
- Beşiktaş Park (UEFA competitions); Eagle's Nest (Kartal Yuvası)
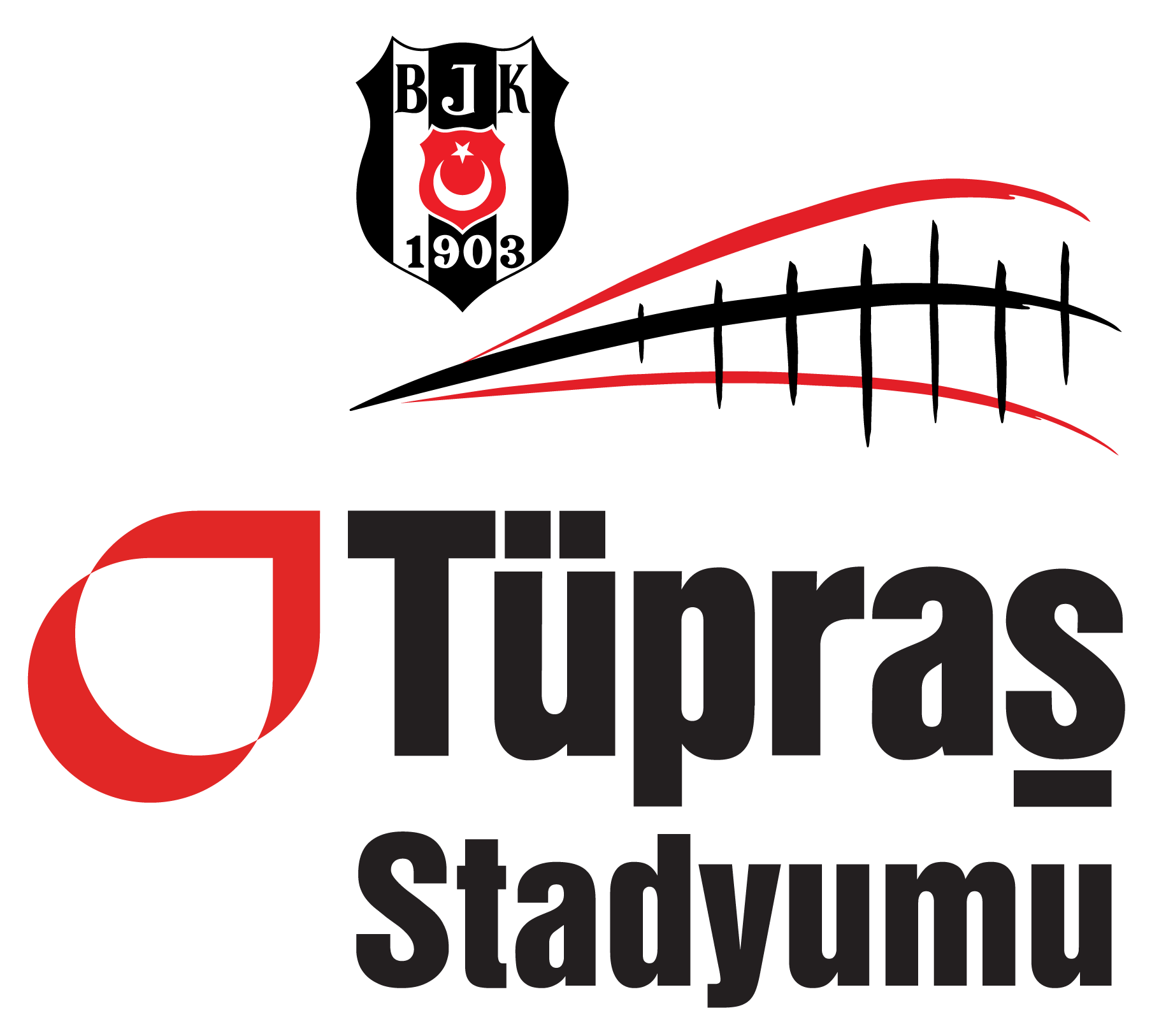

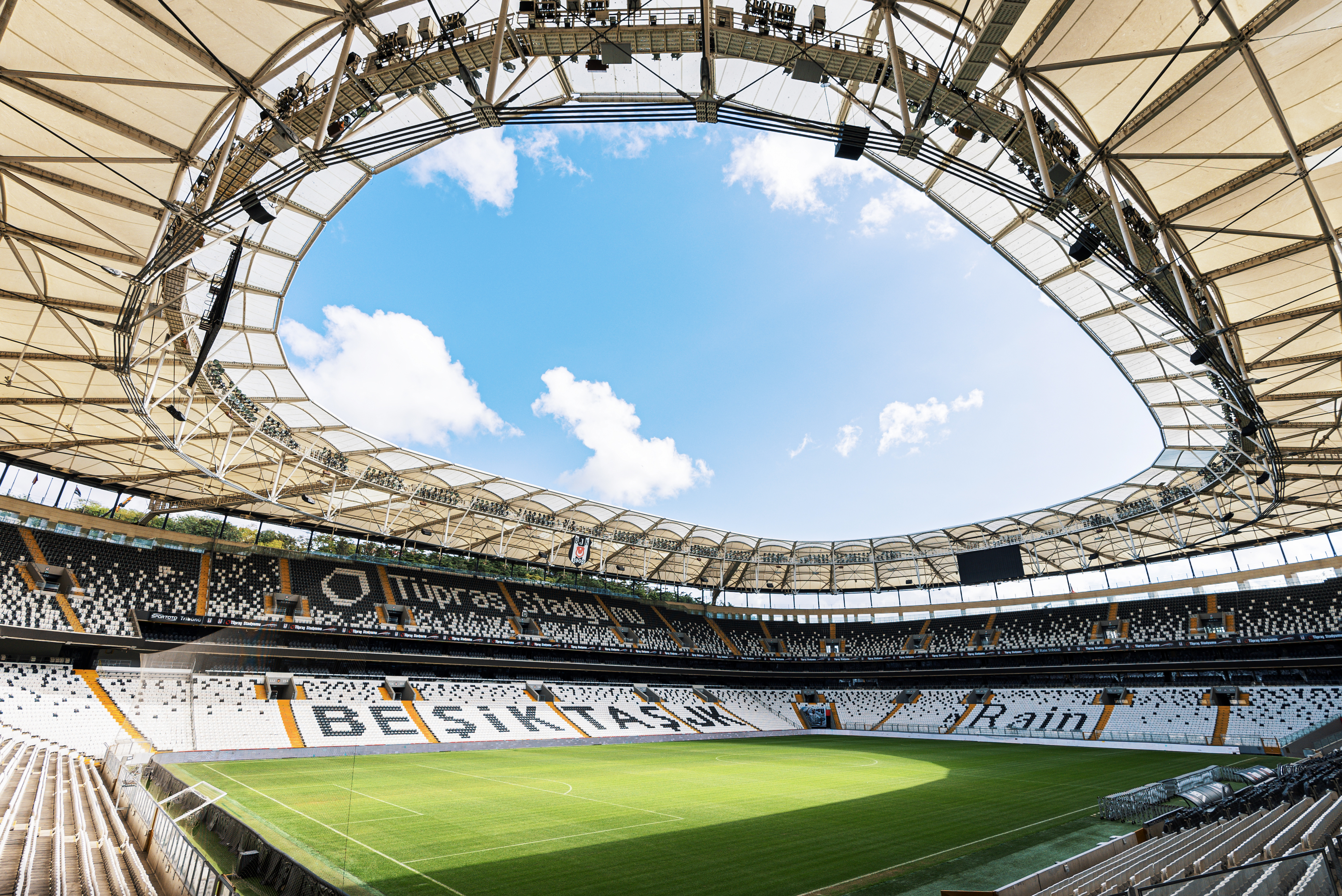
- UEFA Category 4 Stadium

- Location in Istanbul Location in Turkey
- Former names: Vodafone Arena (2016–17); Vodafone Park (2017–23)
- Location: Beşiktaş, Istanbul, Turkey
- Coordinates: 41°02′21″N 28°59′41″E
- Owner: Beşiktaş
- Operator: Beşiktaş
- Capacity: 42,684
- Executive suites: 147
- Surface: Hybrid grass
- Record attendance: 41,843 (Beşiktaş-Galatasaray 29 March 2025)
- Field size: 105 by 68 metres (115 yd × 74 yd)

Construction
- Groundbreaking: October 2013
- Opened: 11 April 2016
- Cost: €110 million (approximate)
- Architects: Bünyamin Derman, Metin Demir
- General contractor: Beşiktaş İnşaat A.Ş.

Tenants
- Beşiktaş (2016–present); Turkey national football team (selected matches)

Beşiktaş Stadyumu (currently known as the Tüpraş Stadyumu for sponsorship reasons) or Beşiktaş Park (during UEFA events) is an all-seater, multi-purpose stadium in the Beşiktaş district of Istanbul, Turkey. It is the home ground of Beşiktaş. The stadium was built on the site of Beşiktaş's former home, BJK İnönü Stadium. It has a capacity of approximately 42,684 spectators, after initially being planned for 41,903. The stadium hosted the 2019 UEFA Super Cup and 2026 UEFA Europa League final, and will host the 2027 UEFA Conference League final.

Beşiktaş Stadium houses 144 executive suites, and one "1903 Lounge" which can entertain up to 1,903 spectators in total. The "1903 stand" has a capacity of 636 spectators. VIP seats in the stadium are equipped with the FUNTORO Stadium & Arena solution – high definition interactive monitors which provide a live TV broadcast, advertising systems, player information etc. The new stadium also has 2,123 square metres of restaurants, 2,520 square metres of terrace restaurants and a VIP parking capacity of 600 vehicles. The ground is a 'smart stadium', where fans enjoy StadiumVision and high-speed Wi-Fi technology, planned in conjunction with Cisco.

Demolition works on BJK İnönü Stadium started on 2 June 2013, following the end of promotion play-offs for the TFF First League. The estimated cost of the project at the time was around $80 million. The new stadium was designed by Bünyamin Derman of DB architects. The old stadium was demolished, except for the Eski Açık stand, since this stand and its towers are considered historical monuments by the government. The Eski Açık stand was re-arranged to resemble the look of an antique amphitheatre. The new stadium was designed to be "in harmony with the natural and historic landscape of the Bosphorus" when seen from the sea.

== History ==
=== İnönü Stadium era ===
==== Location ====
In 1936, French architect and city planner Henri Prost (1874–1959) was invited to Turkey by President Mustafa Kemal Atatürk. He was tasked with the preparation of Istanbul's rough-cut urban planning and rebuilding, which lasted until 1951. In the first plan, Prost thought that the district of Şişli might be a good location for a city stadium. However, the governor of Istanbul, Muhittin Üstündağ, asked Prost to place the stadium in the Dolmabahçe area instead of the stable of the Dolmabahçe Palace as a fait accompli in his master city plan, which came into force in 1939.

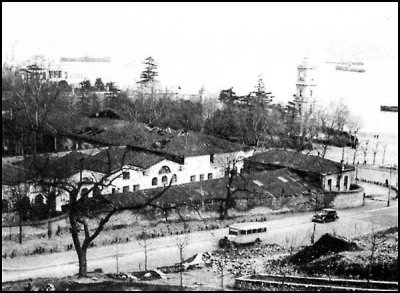
The stables of Dolmabahçe, May 1906

==== Construction ====
BJK İnönü Stadium, originally named the Dolmabahçe Stadium, was designed by Italian architect Paolo Vietti-Violi, who collaborated with Turkish architects Şinasi Şahingiray and Fazıl Aysu for preparing the project. The first foundation was laid on 19 May 1939, but construction was halted due to the outbreak of the Second World War. The stadium was inaugurated on 19 May 1947, by İsmet İnönü, the second President of Turkey and himself a Beşiktaş fan, and Lütfi Kırdar, the Governor of Istanbul.

The initial capacity was 16,000. In the original project plan, there were two bronze statues of athlete figures at the Eski Açık stand: one throwing a discus, and the other throwing a javelin. However, the statues were never built due to financial concerns. The oil factory which was found behind the stadium was demolished to construct the Yeni Açık stand at the west part of the stadium in 1950 (hence the name Yeni Açık, meaning the New Open-top; referring to the two covered stands (Numaralı and Kapalı) and the two open-top stands (Eski Açık and Yeni Açık). In 1952, the stadium was renamed as the Mithat Paşa Stadium, and later in 1973, it was renamed as the İnönü Stadium. A leasing contract was signed between Beşiktaş and the Ministry of Youth and Sports in February 1998 which gave all usage rights of the İnönü Stadium to Beşiktaş for 49 years.

==== First football match ====
The first football match at the Dolmabahçe Stadium took place between Beşiktaş and AIK Stockholm of Sweden, on 27 November 1947, and the first goal in the stadium was scored by Süleyman Seba; the most famous and longest-presiding President of the club (in the 1980s and 1990s) when he used to be a player for Beşiktaş. Beşiktaş lost this match 3–2.

Galatasaray and Fenerbahce shared the stadium with Beşiktaş for many years, before the construction of the Ali Sami Yen Stadium for Galatasaray in 1964, and the renovation of the Şükrü Saracoğlu Stadium for Fenerbahçe in 1982.

==== Renovation ====
Renovation work took place at the BJK İnönü Stadium in 2004. The tartan track was removed within the scope of these activities and the ground level was lowered by four metres to increase the capacity of the stadium to 32,145 spectators. The press seats were relocated to the Numaralı stand from the Kapalı stand. The lounges that were found in the middle of the Kapalı stand were demolished. The number of gates was doubled. A press centre for Beşiktaş TV was built inside the stadium. The restrooms and food counters were renovated. The Yeni Açık stand was covered with a metallic structure. The work was done in compliance with UEFA standards.

==== New stadium project ====
Due to the unique location of İnönü Stadium, which is considered one of the best in the world, and its legal status as a "historic monument" protected by the Turkish High Council of Monuments, the renewal project had to be modified and postponed several times and all official requests, efforts, renewal attempts were denied. In 2008, former club president Yildirim Demirören launched a project designed by HOK sports, with a design capacity of 42,000 spectators. However, this project was also cancelled because of concerns regarding how the new project didn't suit the historical environment of Beşiktaş. Finally, in 2013, current club president Fikret Orman completed the administrative procedures after extended bureaucratic exchanges, and received all required permissions by proposing specific design goals.

=== Vodafone Arena era ===
==== December 2016 bombing ====
On 10 December 2016, two bombs exploded outside the stadium, killing at least 46 (38 police officers, 8 civilians) and injuring 136. The first and larger explosion took place at about 7:30 p.m. after home team Beşiktaş defeated visitors Bursaspor 2–1 in the Turkish Super League. An official with knowledge of the attack said that the timing of the bombing aimed to maximize the loss of life. However, the civilian death toll was lower because fans had already left the stadium after the match. Witnesses also reported hearing gunfire after the explosions. Officials have said that the first explosion was caused by a passing vehicle that detonated in an area where police special forces were located at the stadium exit. A riot police bus appeared to have been the target. Turkish officials said a person who had been stopped by police in nearby Maçka Park committed suicide by triggering explosives moments later.

==== 2017 name change ====
On 26 May 2017, President of Turkey, Recep Tayyip Erdoğan, announced he had instructed his minister of sports to remove the word 'arena' from all stadiums across the country due to his personal objections to the term, associating it with the original Roman meaning. One day later, the Turkish Football Federation (TFF) confirmed the word would be removed accordingly. One week later, Beşiktaş announced the Vodafone Arena was renamed to Vodafone Park.

==== First female referee in a final match ====
Beşiktaş Stadium witnessed the first female referee in a major European men's football final match when French referee Stéphanie Frappart took charge of the UEFA Super Cup match between Liverpool and Chelsea on 14 August 2019. (In August 2003, Nicole Petignat became the first female referee of a men's football match organized by UEFA; AIK Fotboll (SWE) versus Fylkir (ISL) in the preliminary round of the UEFA Cup.)

== Design ==
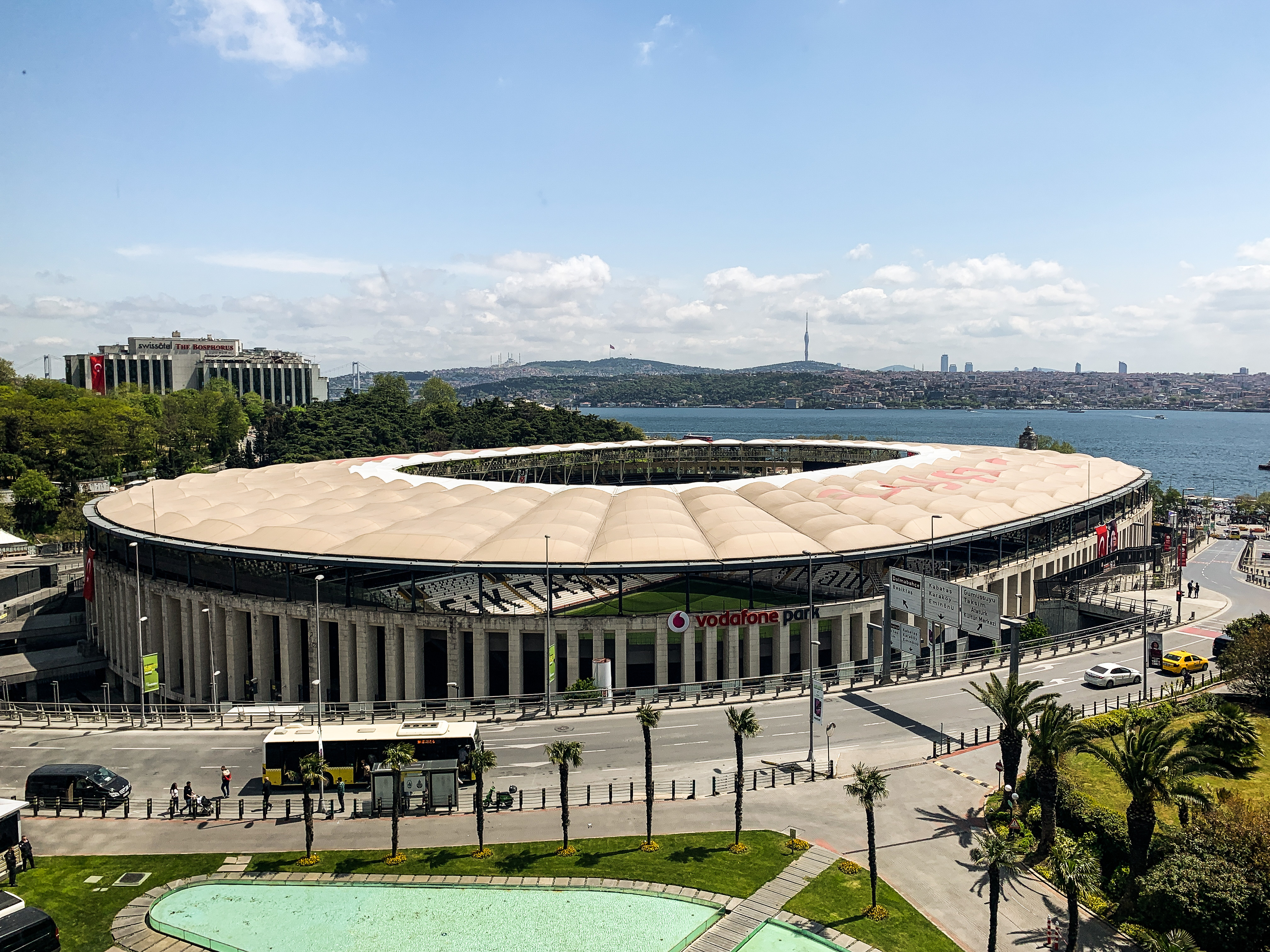
Beşiktaş Stadium in Beşiktaş, Istanbul, is the home of Beşiktaş J.K.

Beşiktaş Stadium was designed by the architectural firm DB Architects. Bünyamin Derman served as the project's architect of record. The stadium meets UEFA Category 4 criteria, the strictest in the ranking defined by UEFA regulations for stadium infrastructure.

Beşiktaş Stadium differs from modern stadiums by three design goals imposed by the authority and nature of the construction site. Thanks to these design goals, "the architecture of the stadium reflects history, heritage and prosperity."

=== Colosseum (Coliseum) Architecture ===
Due to the proximity of Dolmabahçe Palace, the Dolmabahçe Clock Tower, the Dolmabahçe Mosque and the Bosphorus, the Turkish High Council of Monuments demanded a more historic look which should fit the surrounding historical area. Most of the proposed architectural designs for the new stadium were modern structures, with glossy external surfaces made from metal, glass or composite materials. To accomplish the first design goal, a colosseum architecture was proposed to and accepted by the high council. Colosseum architecture was previously used in stadiums such as the Los Angeles Memorial Coliseum and the Busch Memorial Stadium, but mostly several decades ago.

=== Waveform Stands ===
In modern stadiums, the height of the stands are generally at the same level. Since the construction site of Beşiktaş Stadium is narrow and surrounded by roads, the height of the stands decrease specifically at the corners and widen at the edges. The varying elevation creates a significant waveform-shape in the stands and gives a traditional look. The height of the east stand is lower – which is another design goal imposed by the High Council so as not affect the silhouette of the Bosphorus.

=== Elliptical Design ===
The design of the majority of modern football stadiums are mostly square, rectangular with rounded corners, or circular. Some older stadiums include tartan tracks – especially Olympic stadiums. Due to the tartan tracks, these stadiums have elliptical forms like the old İnönü stadium. To be faithful to the previous architecture designed in 1939 and coherent with the two remaining historical towers of the old Inönü stadium, Beşiktaş Stadium also has an elliptical form, although there is no tartan track inside the stadium. The design repeats the same idea of perfect symmetry reached in 1939 by extending the main arc between the two old towers throughout the structure.

== Development ==
=== Environmental compatibility ===
The new stadium project aimed to ensure a low environmental impact via the use of state of the art sustainable technologies. The stadium was constructed to reduce energy consumption from non-renewable energy sources by reducing waste and optimizing the resources available. The Green Building concept of Beşiktaş Stadium ensures environmentally friendly and resource efficient processes at each stage of construction, from site selection and design to construction by using Green Building certified construction materials, to seek the minimum possible impact on the environment.

The stadium will produce electricity using solar energy captured through photovoltaic panels capable of producing 500 kVA per year. This corresponds to the annual electricity consumption of about 100 average households and a CO_{2} saving of around 250 tonnes. The stadium will store rainwater in cisterns to use later for watering the pitch and other purposes. These alternative energy sources are aimed at helping the stadium meet the criteria dictated by the Kyoto Protocol by generating multiple results:

- Intensive exploitation of solar energy through solar tracker tools
- Reductions of greenhouse gases
- No production of chemical or acoustic emissions
- No air pollution
- No risk of fire
- Rainwater harvesting

All concrete and metal parts from the demolished BJK Inönü Stadium were separated and reused; other materials were divided into categories, in order to be recycled, resold, or reused.

=== Historical monument ===
The Eastern-side stand was called Eski Açık (Old Tribune) with a seating capacity of 7,962. There are two towers on the left and right side of the Eski Açık stands and an iron gate in the middle of two towers. The towers and the gate were preserved as a historical monument during the construction of the new stadium.

=== Naming rights ===
Beşiktaş signed a $145 million deal with Vodafone on 21 August 2013. The deal includes shirt sponsorship for three years (+2 optional years that were used), stadium naming rights (to be named 'Vodafone Park'), advertising, and stadium technology infrastructure investment rights for ten (+5 optional) years.

== Facts ==
=== Awards ===
- Beşiktaş Stadium received the Environmentally Friendly Award on 30 April 2015 during the 4th Green Economy Awards Ceremony.
- Beşiktaş Stadium received the "Best Stadium of the Year 2016" award in a public vote and also was chosen as the second best "Stadium of the Year 2016", after the London Stadium by an expert panel of five juries. The Beşiktaş Stadium obtained more points in the "Relation with surroundings" category (7.600) than the London Stadium (7.000), thanks to the design goals explained above.
- Beşiktaş Stadium received "Project of the Year Award at The Stadium Business Design & Development Summit" in 2017, surpassing Metropolitano Stadium in Madrid – where the event was held – and the T-Mobile Arena in Las Vegas.

=== Construction of the Foundation ===
- Bore pile used: 10.8 km
- Anchorage: 28.5 km
- Nails used: 2.2 km
- Depth: 30 meters
- Soil excavated for foundation: 760,000 m^{3}

=== Capacity ===
- Total: 42,684
- Number of Suites:147
- Suite Seats: 1847
- VIP Parking: 350
- VIP Seats: 3500
- Handicap Seats: 81 (+ 81 for companions)
- Press Seats: 186

=== Pitch Dimensions ===
- Distance between goal line and stands: 7,95 m
- Distance between touch line and stand: 6,15 m

=== Roof ===
The lightweight cable roof is designed as a classic looped cable roof containing one compression and one tension ring. The majority of the roof is covered with a membrane and is composed of 260 tons of 246 rope assemblies. The inner tension ring, which is made of 8 Ø110 mm full locked coil ropes with a single length of nearly 200 meters, is connected to the outer compression ring by radial cables that consist of full locked coil ropes with Ø110, Ø85, Ø65 and Ø45 mm.

== Concerts ==
=== BJK İnönü Stadium Era ===
Previously, while Beşiktaş Stadium was the BJK İnönü Stadium, it had been used for many major music concerts including:

- Bryan Adams on 28 July 1992 as the first event
- Guns N' Roses, as part of the Use Your Illusion Tour on 26 May 1993
- Metallica as part of the Nowhere Else to Roam and World Magnetic Tour on 25 June 1993 and 27 June 2010 respectively.
- Bon Jovi as part of the I'll Sleep When I'm Dead Tour on 13 September 1993
- Madonna, as part of The Girlie Show Tour on 7 October 1993
- Elton John as part of The One Tour on 20 June 1993
- Scorpions as part of the Face The Heat Tour
- Sting as part of the Ten Summoner's Tales Tour
- Rod Stewart as part of the A Spanner in the Works Tour
- Tina Turner as part of the Wildest Dreams Tour on 20 September 1996
- Michael Jackson planned to give a concert during his Dangerous World Tour on 4 October 1992 but this concert was cancelled. Later on Dangerous Tour, on 23 September 1993, he gave his one and only concert in İnönü Stadium and Turkey.
- The stadium hosted the heavy metal Sonisphere Festival in 2010, featuring the "Big Four" of thrash metal: Metallica, Slayer, Megadeth, and Anthrax, in addition to Manowar, Rammstein, Alice in Chains, Accept, Stone Sour, Volbeat, Pentagram and Hayko Cepkin.
- Rihanna performed as part of the Diamonds World Tour on 30 May 2013 for around 35,000 people.
- Iron Maiden performed as part of the Maiden England World Tour on 26 July 2013.

=== Vodafone Park Era ===
- Shakira performed in the stadium as part of the El Dorado World Tour on 11 July 2018. Around 50,000 people were in attendance.
- Mor ve Ötesi performed in the stadium on 28 May 2022 for around 35,000 people. The concert's movie Tamiri Mümkün released on 13 January 2022.

== Surroundings ==
Due to the nearby presence of Dolmabahçe Palace and Dolmabahçe Mosque, Beşiktaş Stadium's height was kept under 32 meters. In the old İnönü Stadium, the Dolmabahçe Clock Tower could be seen from two different stands, more precisely from the Kapalı and Yeni Açık stands. On matchdays, TV broadcast cameras would often focus on the tower, creating a memorable image for viewers. Like the clock tower, the Dolmabahçe Mosque was also visible from two stands. The stadium is overlooked by the 10 December Martyrs Park, a small park commemorating the victims of the December 2016 Istanbul bombings.

=== Wooded Road ===
From the Beşiktaş district, supporters and visitors traditionally approach the stadium through the historical Dolmabahçe Street, called "Ağaçlı Yol" (the Wooded Road) in Turkish. This ritual from the İnönü Stadium days takes place on match days and is a source of inspiration for several songs and chants written in the past.

=== Dolmabahçe Palace ===
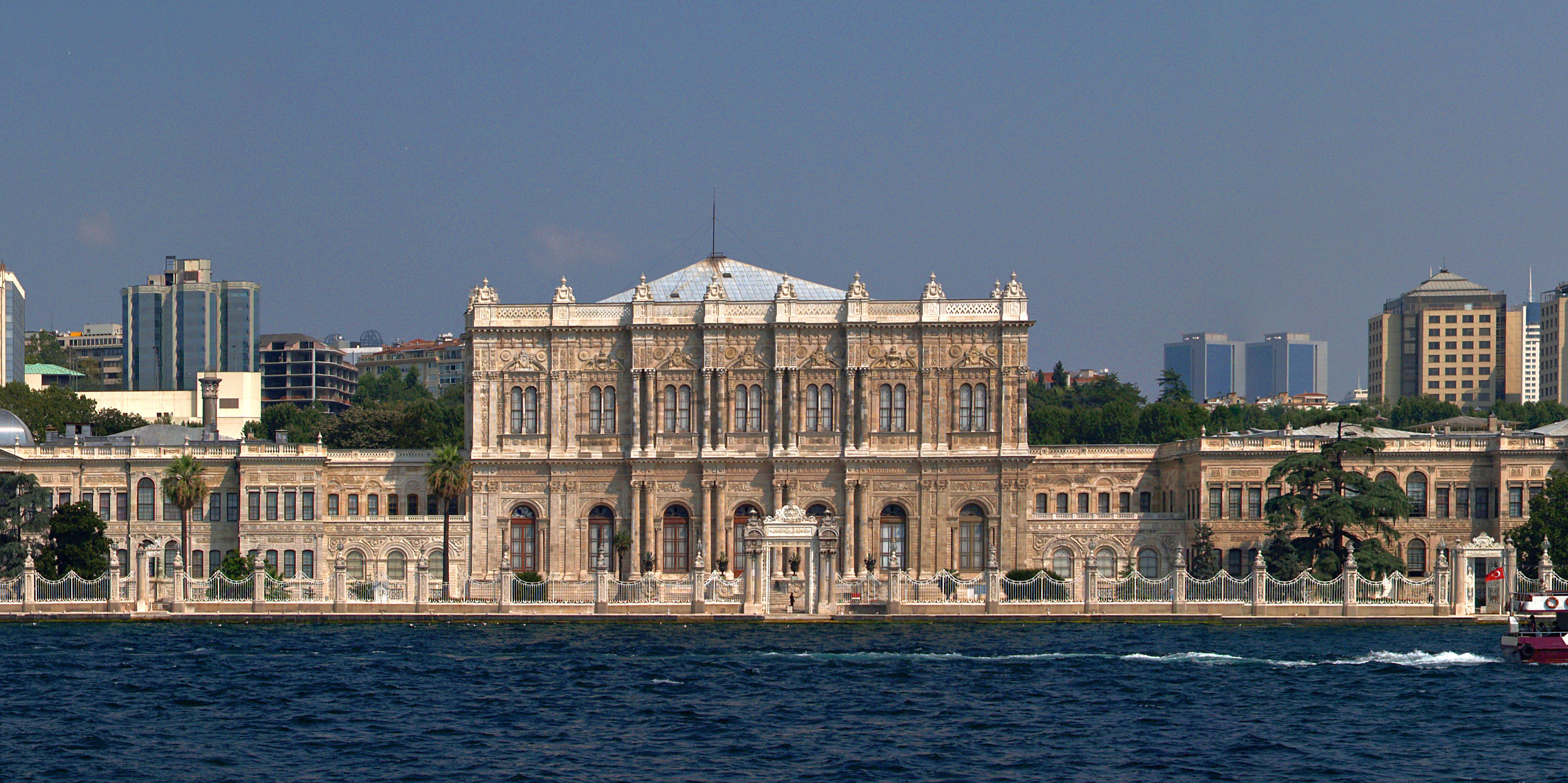
Dolmabahçe Palace

Dolmabahçe Palace was built by Sultan Abdulmecid (1839–1861), who was the 31st Ottoman Sultan. The palace, whose construction commenced on 13 June 1843, was brought into use on 7 June 1856, upon completion of surrounding walls. The palace consists of three mainparts, named as the Imperial Mabeyn (State Apartments), Muayede Salon (Ceremonial Hall) and the Imperial Harem. The Imperial Mabeyn was allocated for administrative affairs of the state, the Imperial Harem was allocated for the private lives of the sultan and his family, and the Muayede Salon, placed between these two sections, was allocated for exchanging of "bayram" greetings between the sultan and dignitary statesmen along with use for some important state ceremonies. The main building is three storeys (including the basement) on the side which is parallel to sea and four storeys on the inland side, involving the Harem quarters with the musandıra (garret) floor.

=== Dolmabahçe Clock Tower ===
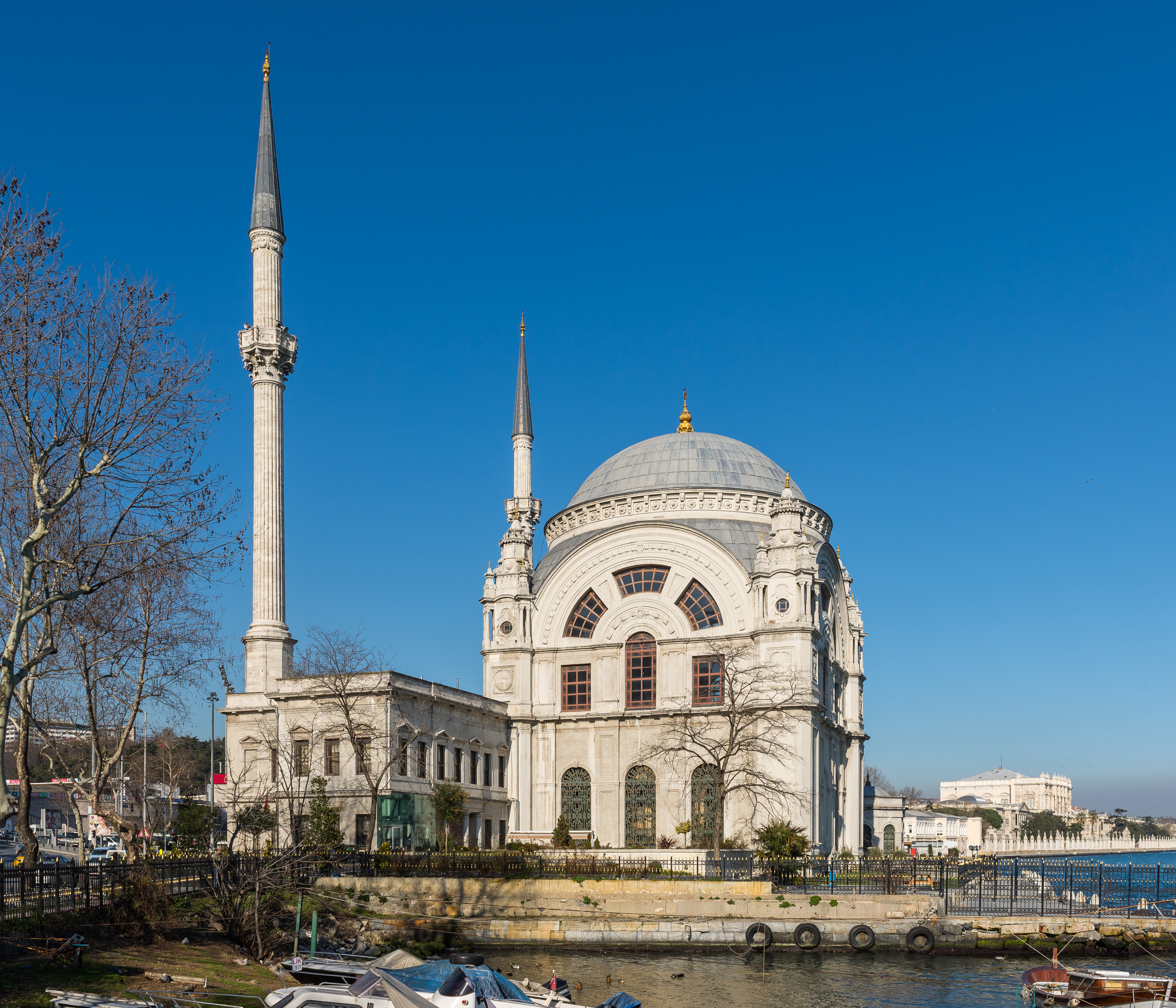
Dolmabahçe Mosque

Dolmabahçe Clock Tower is a clock tower situated outside Dolmabahçe Palace. The tower was constructed by the famous Armenian architect Sarkis Balyan between 1890 and 1895 with the order of Ottoman sultan Abdul Hamid II (1842–1918). Designed in Ottoman neo-baroque style, the four-sided, four-storey tower stands at a height of 27 metres. Its clock was manufactured by the renowned French clockmaker house of Jean-Paul Garnier, and installed by the court clock master Johann Mayer. In 1979, the original mechanical clock was converted partly to an electrical one. On two opposite sides of the tower, the tughra of Sultan Abdul Hamid II is found.

=== Dolmabahçe Mosque ===
Dolmabahçe Mosque is located in the south of Dolmabahçe Palace, on the coast. It was originally commissioned by the mother of Sultan Abdülmecid, Bezm-i Alem Valide Sultan After her death, it was continued by Sultan Abdülmecid. The mosque was completed in 1855; its architect is Garabet Balyan. Dolmabahçe Mosque is one of the ornamented mosques constructed in Baroque style. Since the mosque is adjacent to the palace, a two-storey Sultan maksoorah was constructed on the front part where the Sultan and statesmen could perform their prayers and where public processions and meetings could be accommodated. Circular window design, which is rarely seen in Turkish mosque architecture, gives the building a different look with its peacock-tail design. The mosque has two minarets with a single balcony. The interior has a decoration with a mixture of baroque and ampere styles. From the dome hangs a precious chandelier.

== Inauguration ==
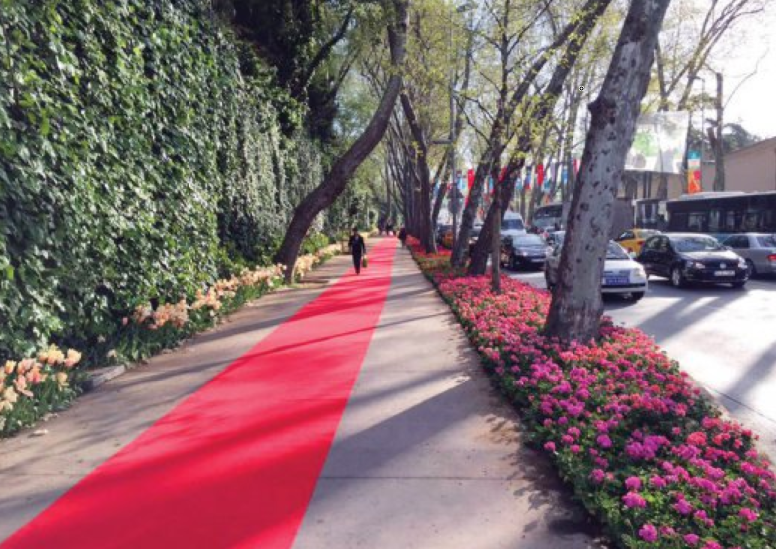
Inauguration day of the stadium, red carpet on the Wooded Road

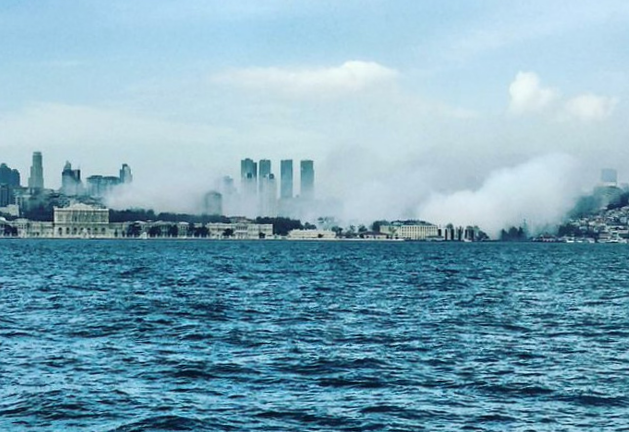
Distant view of Beşiktaş district from Üsküdar across the Bosporus strait, on the inauguration day of the stadium

The opening ceremony of the stadium was held on 11 April 2016, with a Süper Lig match against Bursaspor on matchday 28. Beşiktaş fans walked down the Wooded Road along the red carpet laid between Beşiktaş and Kabataş. Fans had been lighting flares since 16:00 in the Beşiktaş district, well before the opening ceremony. The game ended 3–2 with two goals from Mario Gómez and one from Alexis for Beşiktaş. In the 22nd minute of the game, during an attack initiated by Oğuzhan Özyakup, the ball met José Sosa, who sent a fine pass behind the defense outside the penalty area. Gómez controlled it in the penalty area, slipped away from goalkeeper Harun Tekin and scored the very first goal at Beşiktaş Stadium.

=== Details ===
11 April 2016
20:00 UTC+3

Beşiktaş	3–2	Bursaspor
Gómez 22', 58'; Alexis 53'		Traoré 29'; Stoch 71'

Beşiktaş Stadium, Istanbul
Attendance: 38,420
Referee: Barış Şimşek

Beşiktaş	Bursaspor

Beşiktaş (4–2–3–1):
GK	29	(Turkey) Tolga Zengin
RB	2	(Turkey) Serdar Kurtuluş (substituted off) 84'
CB	30	(Brazil) Marcelo
CB	12	(Spain) Alexis
LB	3	(Turkey) İsmail Köybaşı (substituted off) 83'
DM	13	(Canada) Atiba Hutchinson
LW	10	(Turkey) Olcay Şahan (substituted off) 71'
RW	17	(Portugal) Ricardo Quaresma (yellow card) 90' (red card) 90'
AM	15	(Turkey) Oğuzhan Özyakup
AM	5	(Argentina) José Sosa
CF	33	(Germany) Mario Gómez
Substitutions:
DM	20	(Turkey) Necip Uysal (substituted on) 71'
LB	6	(Serbia) Duško Tošić (substituted on) 83'
RB	32	(Germany) Andreas Beck (substituted on) 84'
Manager:
Şenol Güneş

Bursaspor (4–4–2):
GK	1	(Turkey) Harun Tekin
RB	3	(Turkey) Emre Taşdemir
CB	23	(Australia) Aziz Behich
CB	66	(Czech Republic) Tomáš Sivok (yellow card) 23'
LB	6	(Turkey) Şamil Çinaz
RM	8	(Mali) Bakaye Traoré (substituted off) 64'
CM	18	(Argentina) Pablo Batalla (yellow card) 59'
CM	21	(Japan) Hajime Hosogai (yellow card) 45' (red card) 90'
LM	91	(Senegal) Ricardo Faty (substituted off) 75' (yellow card) 55'
CF	15	(Czech Republic) Tomáš Necid (substituted off) 64'
CF	88	(Turkey) Deniz Yılmaz
Substitutions:
DM	68	(Turkey) Jem Karacan (substituted on) 64' (yellow card) 68'
LB	89	(Slovakia) Miroslav Stoch (substituted on) 64' (yellow card) 90'
RB	14	(Chile) Cristóbal Jorquera (substituted on) 75'
Manager:
Hamza Hamzaoğlu

== Panorama ==
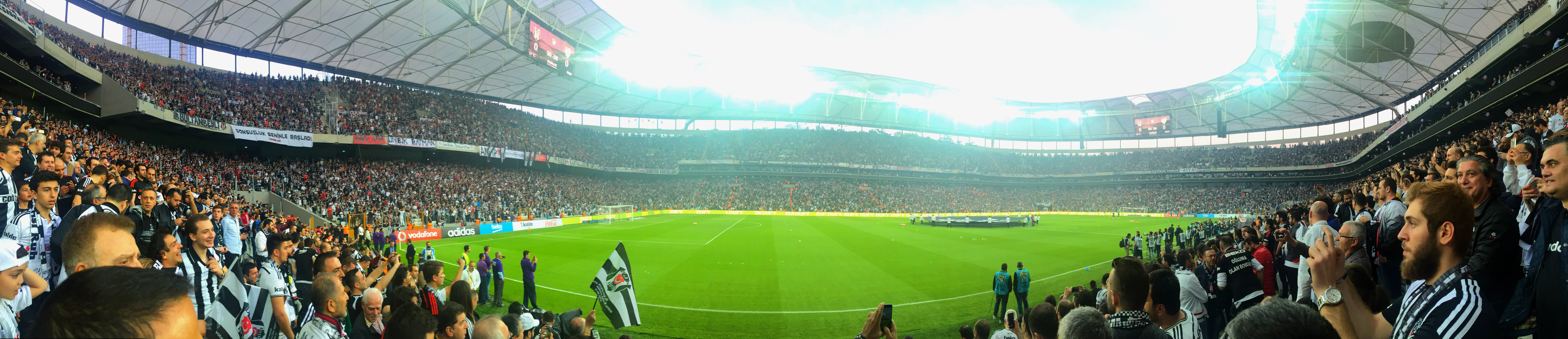
A panoramic view of Beşiktaş Stadium during its opening ceremony on 11 April 2016

== Transport connections ==
Beşiktaş Stadium is a five-minute walk from Taksim Square, a busy transportation hub located in the heart of the Istanbul city centre. The area is served by various bus lines, Taksim metro train station (M2), Kabataş tram station (T1) and Taksim-Kabataş funicular (F1). Scheduled sea transport services are also available for visitors arriving from the Anatolian side of the city, steamships operate services to and from Beşiktaş and Kabataş ferry wharves, whilst the Kabataş wharf is also served by sea buses.

A map of Beşiktaş Stadium in relation to Taksim train station, Kabataş and Taksim funicular stations, Kabataş tram station, and the Beşiktaş and Kabataş ferry wharves

Nearby stations and wharves:

Service/Operator	Station/Wharf	Line
Train	Taksim train station	Yenikapı ↔ Hacıosman
Tram	Kabataş tram station	Bağcılar ↔ Kabataş
Funicular	Kabataş and Taksim funicular stations	Taksim ↔ Kabataş
Steamship	Beşiktaş Wharf	Kadıköy ↔ Beşiktaş Üsküdar ↔ Beşiktaş
Steamship	Kabataş Wharf (closed until 2018)	Kadıköy ↔ Kabataş Üsküdar ↔ Kabataş
Sea bus	Kabataş Wharf (closed until 2018)	Bostancı ↔ Kabataş Bursa ↔ Kadıköy ↔ Kabataş

== See also ==
- BJK İnönü Stadium
- List of football stadiums in Turkey
- Lists of stadiums

Preceded by San Mamés Stadium; Bilbao	UEFA Europa League; Final venue 2026	Succeeded by Waldstadion; Frankfurt
Preceded by A. Le Coq Arena; Tallinn	UEFA Super Cup; Match venue 2019	Succeeded by Puskás Aréna; Budapest
