= Gli =

Cat in Hagia Sophia, Istanbul

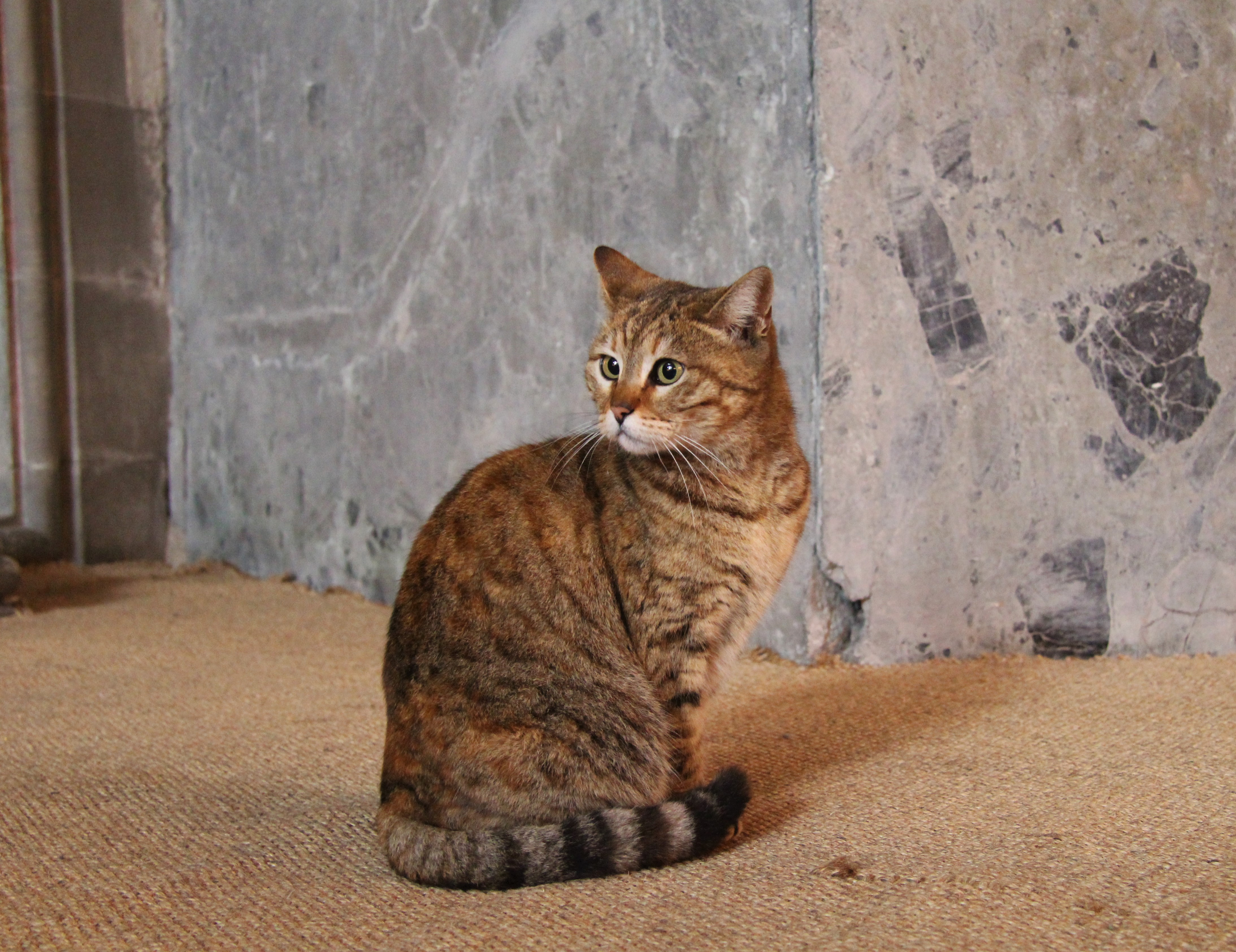
- Gli at the Hagia Sophia in 2013
- Species: Cat (Felis catus)
- Sex: Female
- Born: c. 2004; Hagia Sophia, Fatih, Istanbul, Turkey
- Died: 7 November 2020 (aged 16); Levent, Istanbul, Turkey
- Resting place: Hagia Sophia
- Known for: Living in the Hagia Sophia
- Owners: Hagia Sophia's inventory (June–November 2020)
- Parent: Sofya
- Offspring: Karakiz

Gli (c. 2004 – 7 November 2020) was a cat from Istanbul best known for living in the Hagia Sophia, for which she became an Internet celebrity, grabbing the attention of visiting tourists. Gli was born in 2004 and was raised at the Hagia Sophia. She gained significant media attention when the Hagia Sophia was converted into a mosque in 2020.

Gli died on 7 November 2020 at a veterinary clinic in Levent, Istanbul. It was announced that she would be buried on the premises of the Hagia Sophia. The Instagram account @hagiasophiacat was dedicated to Gli and was followed by more than 118,000 people at the time of her death.

== Life ==
Gli was born at the Hagia Sophia in 2004. A kitten of Sofya, she had two siblings, Pati and Kızım. Gli had only one offspring, a jet-black cat aptly named Karakız ("Black Girl"). Gli was loved by the tourists who visited the Hagia Sophia, which was a museum at the time, and she became a symbol of the Hagia Sophia. Gli first became popular when Barack Obama visited the Hagia Sophia in 2009; he and Recep Tayyip Erdoğan petted Gli. After it was announced that the Hagia Sophia would be converted into a mosque, Gli was posted all over social media and mentioned often in the news, receiving a new wave of fame. Presidential spokesman İbrahim Kalın stated: "That cat has become very famous, and there are others who haven't become that famous yet. That cat will be there, and all cats are welcome to our mosques."

Gli died on 7 November 2020 at a veterinary clinic in Levent, where she had been receiving treatment since 24 September. She was buried in the garden of the Hagia Sophia.

== See also ==
- Feral cats in Istanbul
- List of individual cats
