= 2016 Beşiktaş bombings =

Terrorist attack

2016 Beşiktaş bombing
- Part of Kurdish–Turkish conflict (2015–present)
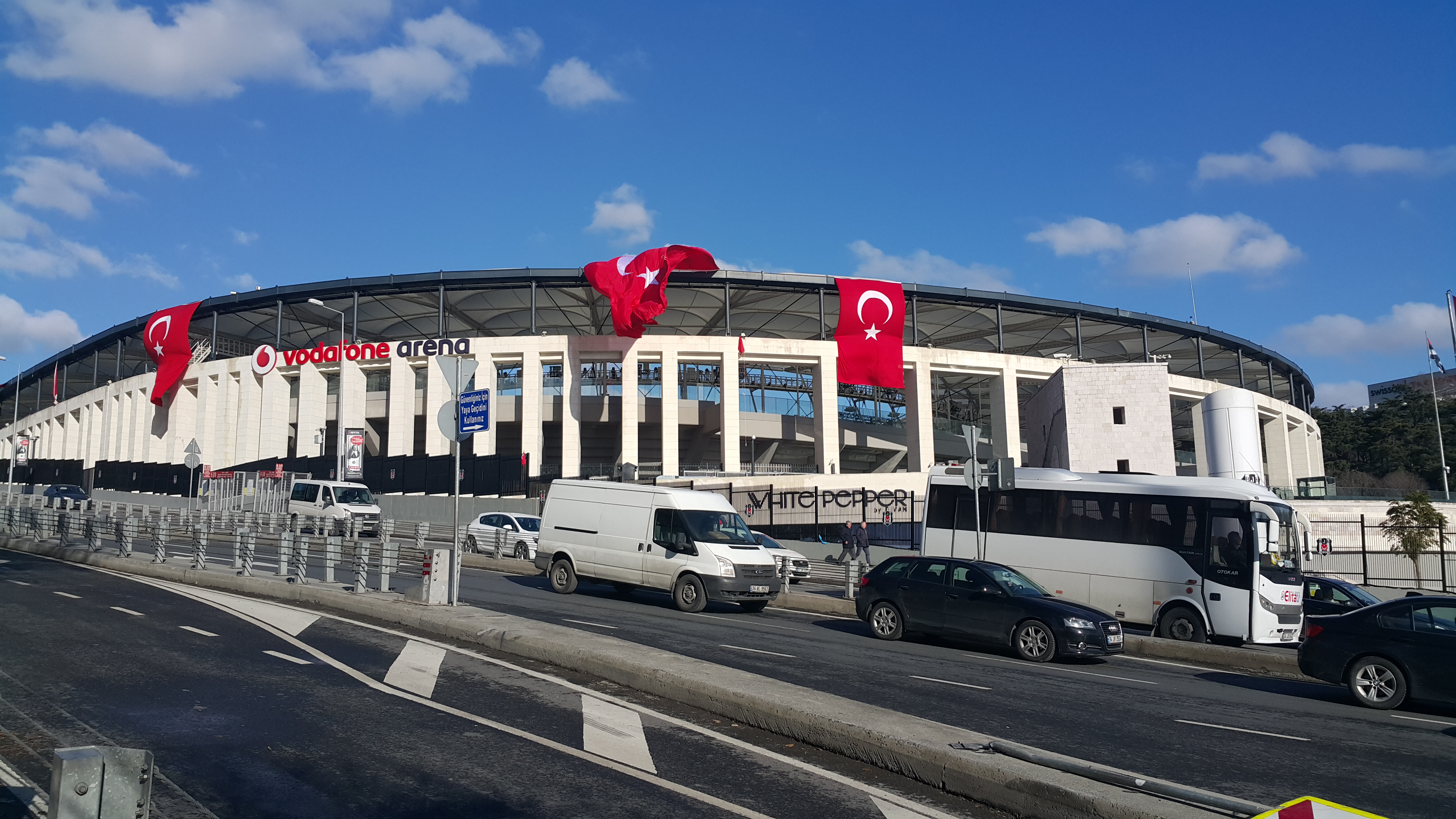
- Vodafone Arena and Dolmabahçe-Gazhane avenue after the attacks, 16 December 2016 Istanbul (Istanbul)
- Location: 41°02′25″N 28°59′35″E; Beşiktaş, Istanbul, Turkey
- Date: 10 December 2016; 9 years ago 22:30 (UTC+3)
- Target: Riot police
- Attack type: Car bombing, suicide bombing
- Weapons: Car bomb and backpack bomb
- Deaths: 48 (39 police officers, 7 civilians, 2 perpetrators)
- Injuries: 166
- Perpetrator: Kurdistan Freedom Hawks

On the evening of 10 December 2016, two explosions caused by a car bombing and suicide bombing in Istanbul's Beşiktaş municipality killed 48 people and injured 166 others. 39 of those killed were police officers, 7 were civilians and 2 were perpetrators. The Kurdistan Freedom Hawks (TAK) assumed responsibility, claiming that their members killed more than 100 police officers.

== Background ==
Earlier in 2016, Turkey had been hit by a number of bombings carried out by the Islamic State of Iraq and the Levant (ISIL) and the Kurdistan Freedom Hawks (TAK). The deadliest of these had been the Gaziantep bombing, killing over 50 people. According to Turkish T24 newspaper, this was the seventh terrorist attack in Istanbul in 2016. The Atatürk Airport attack was the deadliest attack to have occurred in Istanbul in 2016.

On 10 December 2016, the TAK took responsibility and claimed to have killed 100 police officers. In their statement, the group stated that Turkish people are not their direct target and their "Team Martyr Tirej" carried out the action with "utmost attention", but that no "comfortable life" should be expected in Turkey while the imprisonment of their leader Abdullah Öcalan continued. They accused the Turkish state of committing abuses in Kurdish regions, and attributed the chaos to the Turkish ruling-party AKP.

== Bombings ==
The first explosion was a car bombing in front of the Vodafone Arena. About 300–400 kg (660–880 lb) of explosives with iron pellets were used in the attack. It was aimed at a group of riot police which had overseen the spectators of a match leaving the station; the attack took place after the spectators had left. It was reported by NTV that the bombing targeted a police vehicle leaving the stadium. A football match of the 2016–17 Süper Lig between Beşiktaş JK and Bursaspor had taken place around one and a half hours before the explosion and the bombings occurred in the exit for Bursaspor supporters. Bursaspor released a statement from its official Twitter account, saying that none of its supporters had been injured.

The second explosion was a suicide bombing at the nearby Maçka Park. This took place 45 seconds after the first one and was followed by police gunshots. It occurred as a person wearing a coat and carrying a backpack was ordered to stop by the police at the entrance of the park, but blew themselves up before they could be apprehended, killing four police officers and one civilian on the spot. The sounds of the bombing could be heard from as far away as Üsküdar on the Asian side.

Beşiktaş JK released statements identifying two of the people that were killed: Vefa Karakurdu, the head of security of Vodafone Arena and a BJK congress member and Tunç Uncu, an employee of the local BJK shop. Another of the victims was Berkay Akbaş, a medical student studying in Ankara who had been visiting Istanbul and happened to be passing in front of the stadium in a car during the attack. Police victims include Adem Oguz, Adem Serin, Ali Aksoy, Durmus Ocal, Hasan Bilgin, Ilker Uylas, Kadir Yildirim, Mehmet Atici, Metin Duzgun, Mustafa Ozturk, Yasin Ike, Suleyman Sorkut, Okan Dogan, Soner Idil, Mehmet Zengin, Oguzhan Duyar and Hamdi Dikmen.

== Aftermath ==
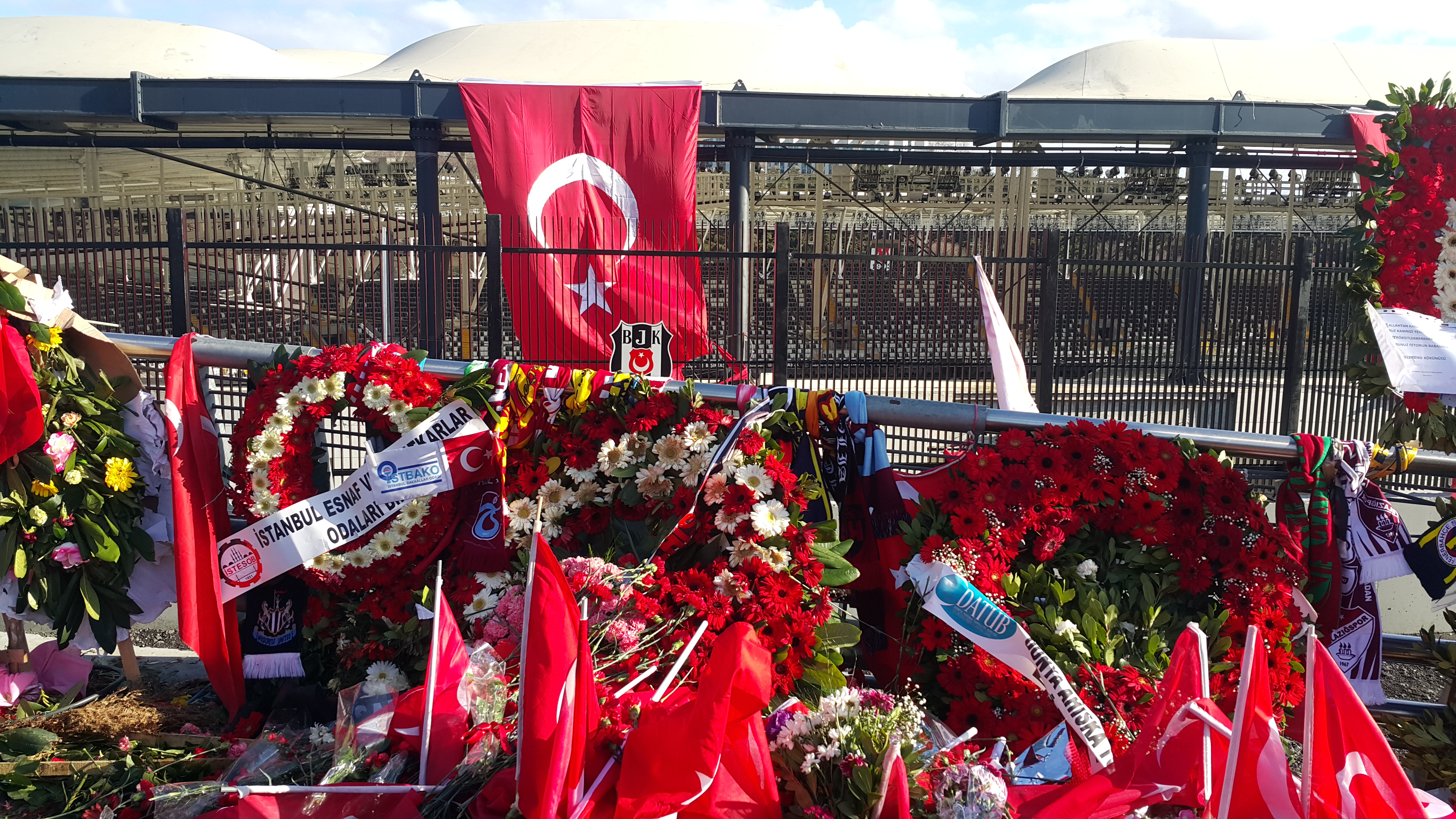
Memorial point after December 2016 Istanbul bombings

RTÜK, the Turkish broadcast regulatory authority, imposed a temporary broadcast ban on the bombing except for officially released information. Six prosecutors were immediately tasked with investigating the attack. 13 people were arrested in the following hours in relation to the attack. Major roads in the city were closed after the attack; these included roads linking Ortaköy to Beşiktaş, Karaköy to Dolmabahçe and Gümüşsuyu to Dolmabahçe.

President Recep Tayyip Erdoğan released a statement on 11 December 2016 at around 01:30 local time, officially confirming deaths for the first time but not specifying a number. He also added that the aim of the attack was to maximize the death toll. In his statement, Erdoğan wrote that the organization that perpetrated the attack was not important as "all terrorist organizations, including PKK, DAESH or FETÖ strike Turkey with the same goals". He also criticized unspecified Western countries by accusing them of "supporting terror".

According to Mark Lowen, the BBC's correspondent in Turkey, Kurdish militant groups were implicated by the fact that the police were targeted. Deputy Prime Minister Numan Kurtulmuş said that signs were suggesting that the Kurdistan Workers' Party (PKK) might have carried out the attack. Later, the Kurdistan Freedom Hawks (TAK) claimed responsibility for the bombings. By December 12, 235 were detained in an anti-terror raid, in which 200 of those detained were members of the Peoples' Democratic Party (HDP). They were charged on 11 counts of terrorism and spreading terrorist propaganda on social media. The attack was condemned by ruling AKP and 2 opposition parties in the parliament, the Republican People's Party (CHP) and the Nationalist Movement Party (MHP), in a mutual declaration.

== Renaming of the location ==
The location where the bombing occurred was known as Free Hill (Beleştepe). Situated northwest of the stadium, the hill allowed people to freely watch the football matches in the stadium before the new stadium was built. Two days after the bombing, the council of Beşiktaş municipality decided to rename the location Martyrs' Hill (Şehitler Tepesi) in honor of the people who died there. The area is now commemorated as 10 December Martyrs Park.

== Reactions ==
=== Domestic ===
The day following the bombing was declared a day of national mourning in Turkey. The Turkish Democracy Platform, a pro-government group formed in opposition to the coup d'état attempt earlier in the year, announced that an anti-terror march would be held at noon on 11 December. The Peoples' Democratic Party (HDP) released a statement condemning the attack and calling on what they considered "policies provoking polarization and conflict" to stop for an end to violence in Turkey.

=== Countries ===
- Azerbaijan - President Ilham Aliyev decried the attack and urged for "a resolute fight against any kind of terrorism".
- Bosnia and Herzegovina - Chairman of the Presidency, Mladen Ivanić says "Terrorism and extremism are threats to global security without borders, so it is essential to fight jointly against this threat," in a letter to President Erdogan.
- Canada - On his Twitter account, Canadian Foreign Minister Stephane Dion strongly condemned the attack by saying "Our thoughts are with victims and families and the people of Turkey."
- Czech Republic - During a visit to Turkey on 13 December, Czech FM Lubomír Zaorálek condemned the attack and the PKK, and received gratitude from Turkish counterpart Mevlüt Çavuşoğlu for his statements, recognition of PKK as a terrorist organization, closing of YPG office in Prague, and statement of EP Czech member Tomáš Zdechovský which calls for "no tolerance for IS and PKK" and a "propaganda-ban" on PKK.
- Egypt - Egyptian Foreign Ministry Spokesman Ahmed Abu Zeyd expressed solidarity with Turkish people by saying "Egypt strongly condemns the attacks in Istanbul and reiterates its stance against terrorism that threatens international peace and security."
- France - French President François Hollande denounced the blasts, showing his support to Turkey.
- Germany - Foreign Minister Frank-Walter Steinmeier condemned the attack and said Germany was mourning with Turkey. German Chancellor Angela Merkel expressed her condolences to President Erdogan during a phone call.
- Hungary - Hungarian Foreign Ministry spokesman Tamas Menczer said the attack was committed against the European Union as well, saying, "The security of Europe starts with Turkey's stability."
- India - The Foreign Ministry also condemned the terror attack by saying "Terrorism is wholly unacceptable, whatever the type and declaration. The shameful attack in Istanbul underscores the need for the world community to find a common solution to the scourge of terrorism." in a statement.
- Kazakhstan - President Nursultan Nazarbayev condemned the attack.
- Georgia - Prime Minister Giorgi Kvirikashvili expressed condolences to the families of the victims and added they were ready to show support in Turkey's fight against the terrorism.
- Greece - The Greek Foreign Ministry said in a statement that Greece "stands with all its friends and neighbours during their difficult time." Prime Minister Alexis Tsipras expressed his condolences over the terror attack in Istanbul to Turkish Prime Minister Binali Yildirim during a phone call.
- Lithuania - President Dalia Grybauskaite expressed her condolences in a message she sent to President Recep Tayyip Erdogan.
- Malaysia - Malaysian government also strongly condemned the attack, calling it "inhumane" in a statement issued by the country's Foreign Ministry.
- Northern Cyprus - Northern Cyprus joined Turkey in declaring a day of national mourning.
- Pakistan - President Mamnoon Hussain also condemned the blasts saying the terrorist attacks cannot shake the resolve of Turkish people and the government in their war against terrorism. Prime Minister Nawaz Sharif also expressed deep sorrow strongly condemning the attack.
- Portugal - President Marcelo Rebelo de Sousa conveyed a condolence message to President Erdogan.
- Philippines - The Philippine government also condemned "in the strongest terms" the latest terrorist attack on Turkey. "We are one with Turkey and its people in its continued efforts to combat terrorism in all its forms." said the Department of Foreign Affairs in a release.
- Romania - Romanian Defense Minister Mihnea Motoc "strongly condemned" the terror attack in Istanbul, saying, "had no excuse and could not reach its aims."
- Russia - President Vladimir Putin also expressed condolences for those who lost their lives, condemning "this cowardly, cynical crime".
- Saudi Arabia - Saudi Arabia also condemned the attack by describing it as "unacceptable".
- Singapore - The Foreign Ministry strongly condemned the attack and expressed condolences.
- Spain - Prime Minister Mariano Rajoy condemned the attack and said on his Twitter account that "Solidarity against barbarism and terror. We would like to send our sincere solidarity and support messages to Turkish authorities in these difficult times."
- Sweden - Foreign Minister Margot Wallström condemned the attack in her Twitter account and expressed her condolences for the victims.
- Ukraine - President Petro Poroshenko strongly condemned the terror attack in Istanbul, saying, "there cannot be a justification for it" on his Twitter account.
- United Kingdom - Foreign Secretary Boris Johnson said the "U.K. was committed to working with Turkey to tackle terrorism," adding that his thoughts were with all those affected.
- United States - "Our thoughts and prayers go out to the victims, their families and loved ones, and to all the people of Turkey. We stand together with Turkey, our NATO Ally, against all terrorists who threaten Turkey, the United States, and global peace and stability." US National Security Council spokesman Ned Price said in a statement. In a separate statement, U.S. Defense chief Ash Carter said that Saturday's attacks "only redoubles our resolve to stand shoulder to shoulder with our Turkish allies in condemning these attacks and relentlessly combatting terrorism."

=== Supranational bodies ===
- UEFA – On Twitter, the European football governing body says "UEFA would like to express its deepest condolences to the families of all the victims of tonight's bombing in Istanbul," it said. strongly" condemned "the horrible act" and sent its support to the Turkish Football Federation, Besiktas and Bursaspor football clubs.
- European Union - "My thoughts & solidarity with Turkish citizens, with families of victims of Istanbul attacks. I wish speedy and full recovery to the injured,” the President of the European Parliament, Martin Schulz posted on social media. In a separate statement, EU High Representative for Foreign Affairs Federica Mogherini posted on her Twitter account saying "All our solidarity to all citizens of Turkey."
- NATO - Secretary General Jens Stoltenberg condemned the attack, calling it "horrific acts of terror." He stressed that NATO stood united in solidarity with its ally Turkey. "We remain determined to fight terrorism in all its forms," he added.
- Organisation of Islamic Cooperation - OIC Secretary General, Yousef Al-Othaimeen offered "his sincere condolences to the families of the victims, the government and the people of Turkey" and wished early recovery to the injured people.
- United Nations - Secretary General Ban Ki-moon expressed his deepest sympathy and condolences to the families of the victims by hoping that the perpetrators of this terrorist act will be swiftly identified and brought to justice.
