= 10 December Martyrs Park =

Park in Istanbul, Turkey

- 10 Aralık Şehitleri Parkı
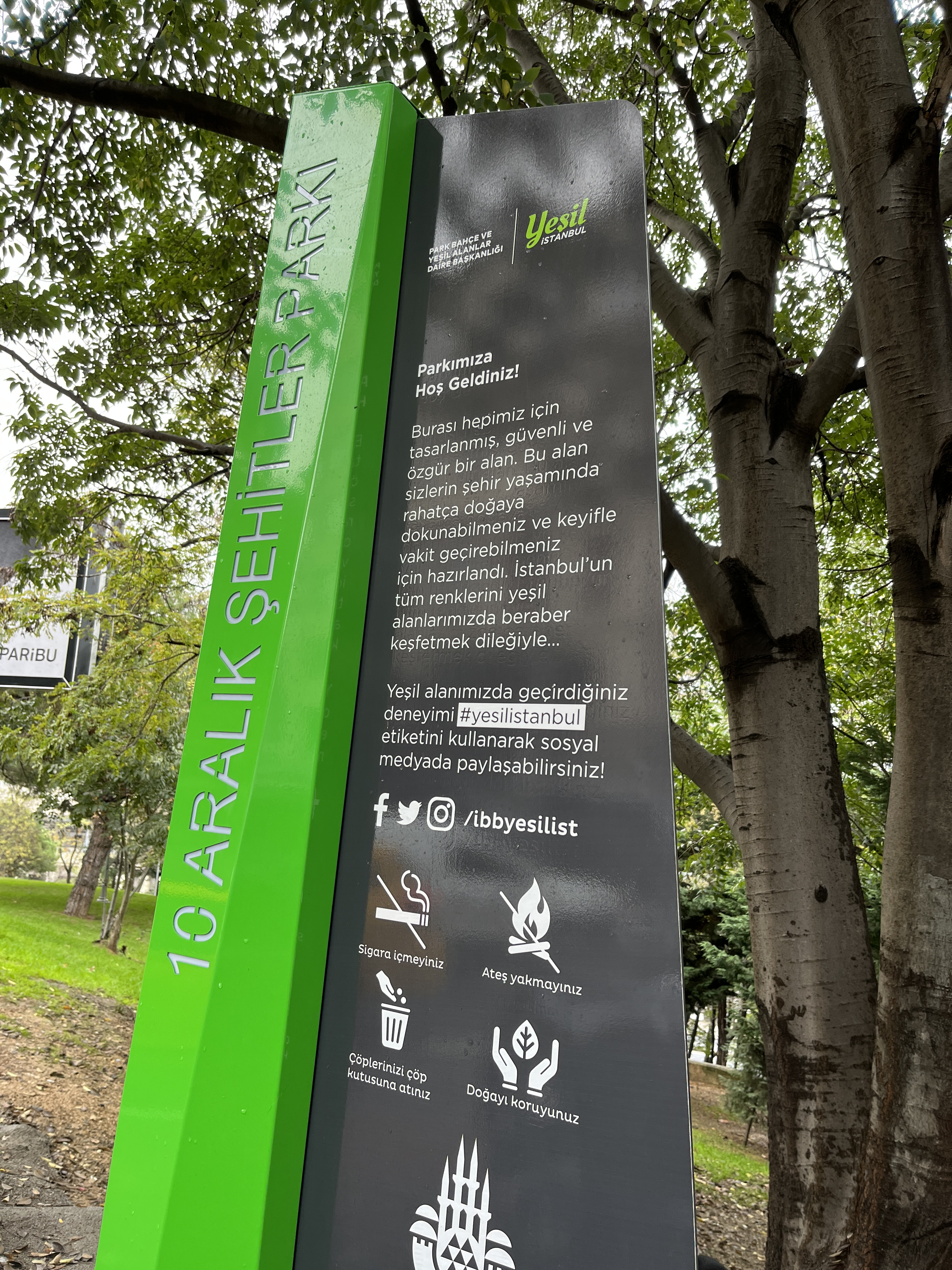
- Park sign in 2023
- Location: Beyoğlu, Istanbul, Turkey
- Coordinates: 41°02′16″N 28°59′37″E

10 December Martyrs Park (Turkish: 10 Aralık Şehitleri Parkı) is a park in Beyoğlu, Istanbul, Turkey.

The park commemorates the victims of the December 2016 Istanbul bombings, which killed 48 people and wounded 166 others. The park overlooks the Beşiktaş Stadium.

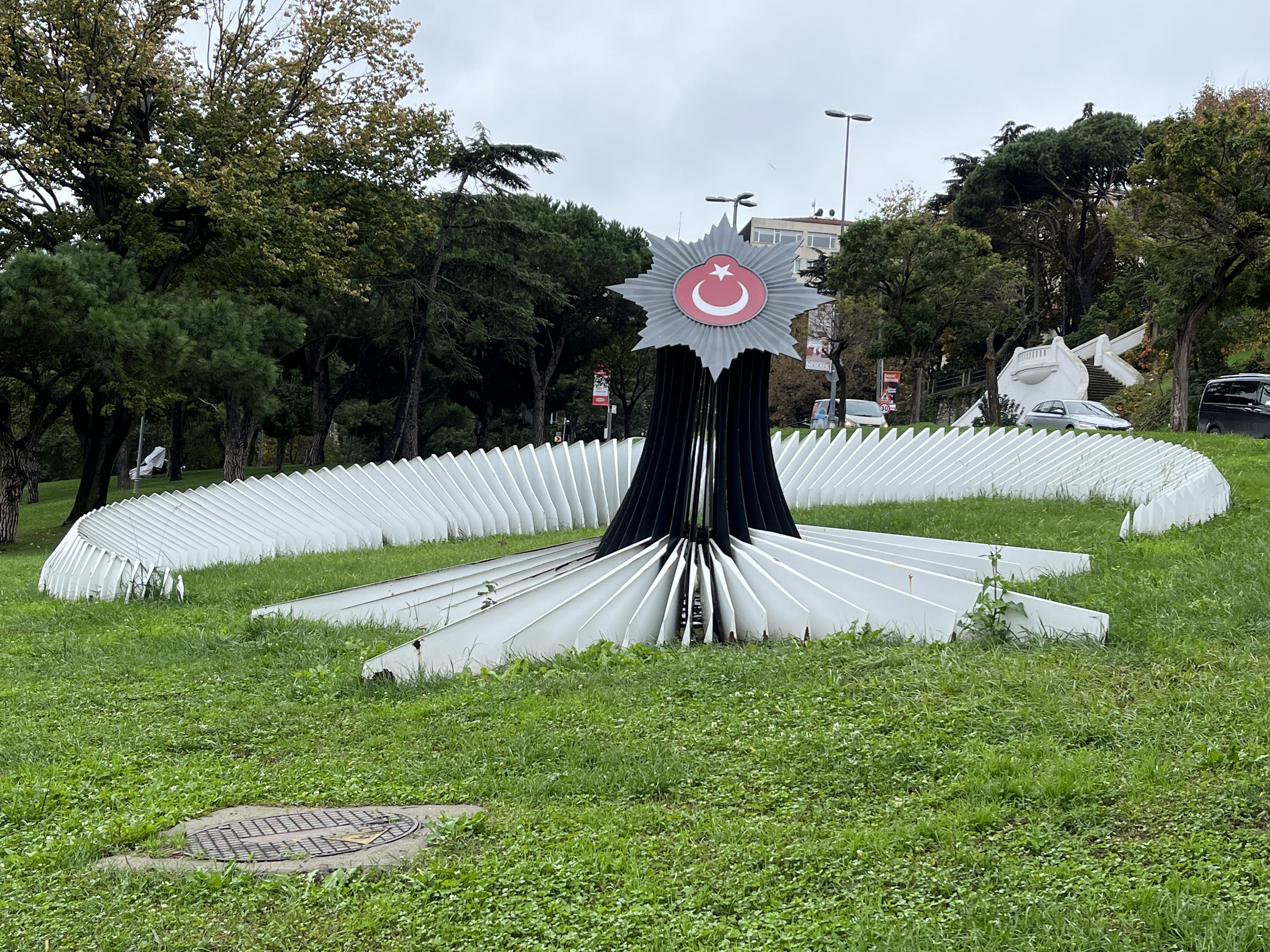
