= Canadian Veterinary Medical Association =

Professional organization devoted to animal welfare

The Canadian Veterinary Medical Association (abbr. CVMA; French: Association canadienne des médecins vétérinaires, ACMV), founded in 1876, is a professional organization for veterinary professionals in Canada.

== Activities ==
=== Publications ===
The CVMA publishes two scientific journals: the Canadian Journal of Veterinary Research (Revue canadienne de recherche vétérinaire), a peer-reviewed quarterly publication available online focusing on comparative and veterinary medicine, as well as the Canadian Veterinary Journal (La revue vétérinaire canadienne), a peer-reviewed monthly publication, focusing on scientific articles, regular columns, news, and information about new products. The CVMA also publishes information about pet care for the public.

=== Membership ===
Veterinary students in Canada are automatically members of the CVMA and are referred to as Students of the CVMA (SCVMA) (Étudiants de l’Association canadienne des médecins vétérinaires, ÉACMV). Each of Canada's five veterinary schools has a student representative who sits on the CVMA's Student committee. Veterinary students can attend an annual symposium in veterinary medicine including lectures and labs.

While veterinary schools in Canada are accredited by the Council on Education of the American Veterinary Medical Association, licensing exams for Canadian veterinary students are administered by the National Examination Board of the CVMA.

== Antimicrobial resistance ==
The CVMA has urged the government for further regulatory changes to provide increased veterinary oversight of antibiotic use in Canada to combat antimicrobial resistance. In 2015, the CVMA revised their statement to include a position on use of antimicrobials of high importance in human medicine (VDD Category I to III), stating they should only be used under veterinary oversight with a veterinary prescription.
