= Tombili =

Famous cat from Istanbul, Turkey

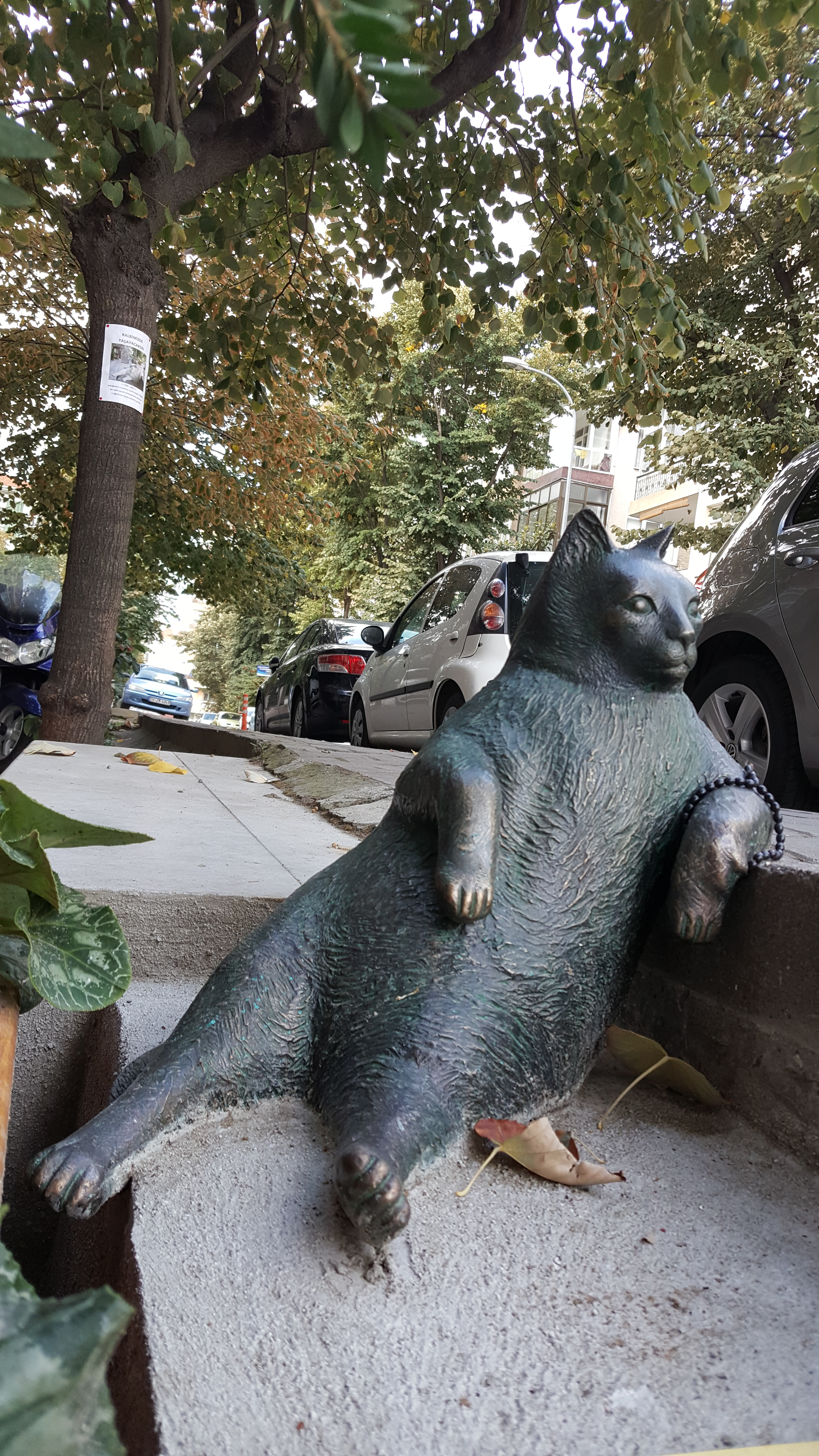
- Tombili's statue
- Species: Cat
- Died: August 1, 2016; Istanbul, Turkey
- Cause of death: Illness
- Occupation: Street cat
- Residence: Kadıköy, Istanbul, Turkey

Tombili (Turkish for chubby) (birthplace and date unknown, died August 1, 2016) was a street cat from Istanbul. He was internationally known because of a photograph that shows him reclining on the sidewalk. The city of Istanbul honored Tombili after his death with a statue.

== Life ==
Tombili (a common Turkish nickname for a chubby pet) was a street cat who lived in Ziverbey in the Kadıköy district of Istanbul. Media reports state Tombili's sex as male; however, that is disputed. Tombili became popular with residents of the neighborhood for his friendliness and his way of leaning against steps. As a result of a photo of this pose, the cat became known worldwide in social networks and became an internet phenomenon. In the district of Kadıköy, he gained cult status. In 2016, Tombili was diagnosed with kidney failure and eventually died in early August.

== Monument ==
After his death, a petition to honor his memory received 17,000 signatures and Kadıköy Mayor Aykurt Nuhoğlu agreed to officially commemorate his life. A local sculptor, Seval Şahin, made a sculpture recreating the pose which had gained him fame, and was inaugurated for World Wildlife Day on October 4, 2016. Hundreds of people came to pay their respects, and Kadıköy deputy mayor Başar Necipoğlu spoke at the event, which was aired on Turkish TV.

=== Theft and return ===
A month later, the sculpture went missing. A photo shared on social media showed the statue missing from its place, leaving behind only the sculpture's brass plaque. Kadıköy Municipality announced on November 8, 2016, that the statue had been stolen, prompting outcry and concern both in Turkey and elsewhere. "They stole the Tombili statue. They are enemies of everything beautiful. All they know is hate, tears and war," Turkish MP Tuncay Özkan was quoted as saying in translation. However, on November 10, 2016, the statue was safely returned.

== See also ==
- List of individual cats
- Kedi (2016 film)
