= Canadian Veterinary Journal =

- Discipline: Veterinary medicine
- Language: English
- Edited by: Dr. John Kastelic, Calgary, Alberta and Dr. Tim Ogilvie, Springbrook, Prince Edward Island

Publication details
- History: 1960–present
- Publisher: Canadian Veterinary Medical Association
- Frequency: Monthly
- Impact factor: 0.9 (2025)

Standard abbreviations
- ISO 4: Can. Vet. J.

Indexing
- CODEN: CNVJA
- ISSN: 0008-5286 (print); 0008-5286 (web)
- LCCN: 89019992
- OCLC no.: 08154872

Links
- Journal homepage

Canadian Veterinary Journal is a monthly peer-reviewed scientific journal covering new scientific developments in veterinary medicine. It was established in 1960 and is the official journal of the Canadian Veterinary Medical Association.

According to the Journal Citation Reports, its 2025 impact factor was 0.9.
