= Journal of Feline Medicine and Surgery =

- Discipline: Veterinary medicine
- Language: English
- Edited by: A. H. Sparkes, M. Scherk

Publication details
- History: 1999-present
- Publisher: SAGE Publications
- Frequency: Monthly
- Impact factor: 1.681 (2010)

Standard abbreviations
- ISO 4: J. Feline Med. Surg.

Indexing
- ISSN: 1098-612X (print); 1532-2750 (web)
- OCLC no.: 38826277

Links
- Journal homepage; Online access; Online archive

Journal of Feline Medicine and Surgery is a peer-reviewed medical journal that covers the field of veterinary medicine as applied to domestic cats. The editors-in-chief are A. H. Sparkes and M. Scherk, both of the International Society of Feline Medicine. The journal is published by SAGE Publications on behalf of the International Society of Feline Medicine and the American Association of Feline Practitioners.

== Scope ==
Journal of Feline Medicine and Surgery is published in two monthly formats. The "classic" editions publish original research papers on aspects of feline medicine and surgery, while the "clinical practice" editions publish commissioned review articles of relevance to feline clinical work, along with other relevant clinical articles such as case reports.

== Abstracting and indexing ==
Journal of Feline Medicine is abstracted and indexed in Scopus, MEDLINE, and the Science Citation Index. According to the Journal Citation Reports, its 2010 impact factor is 1.681.
