= Maçka Park =

Park in Istanbul

Maçka Democracy Park
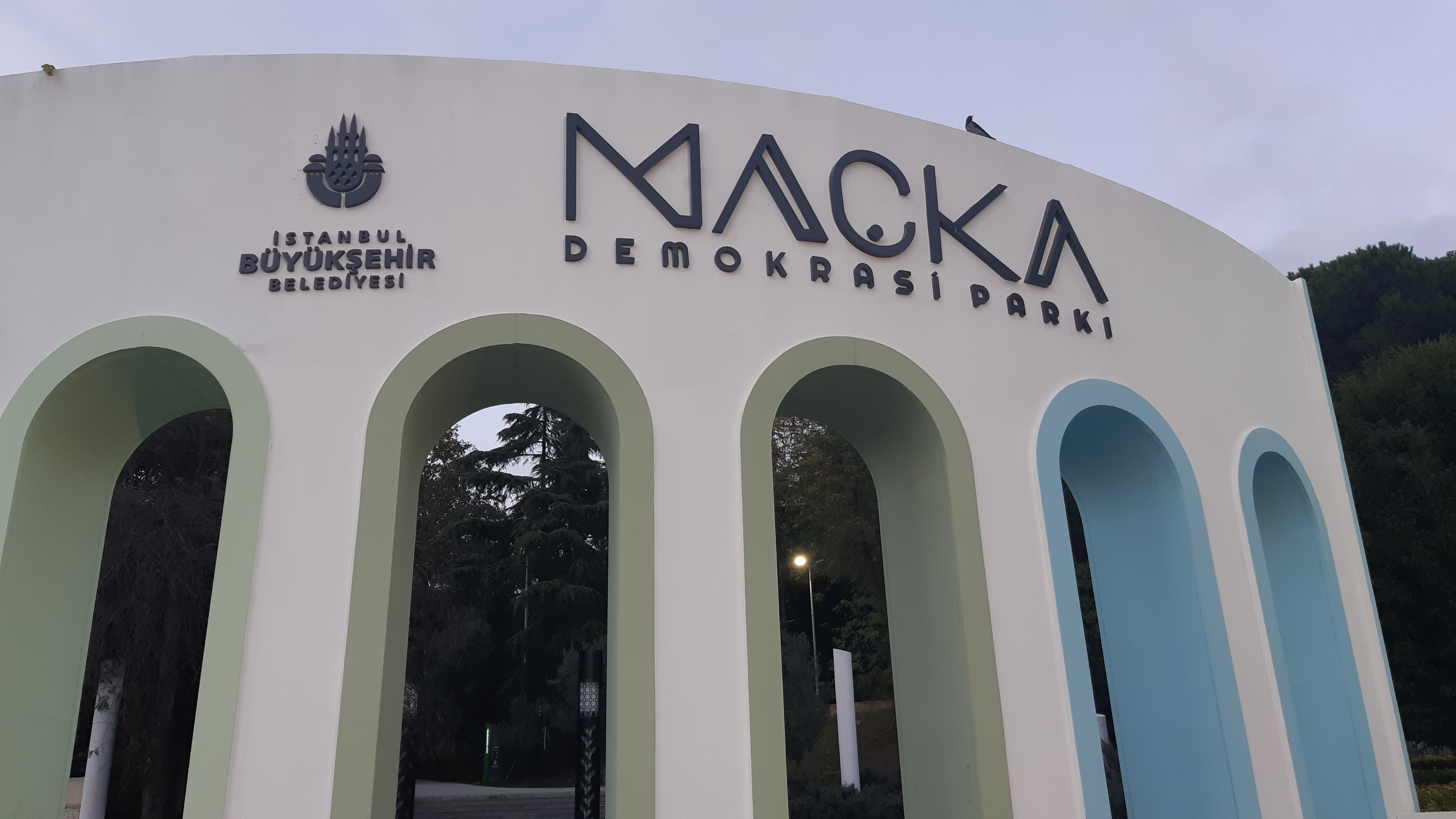
- Maçka Park Entrance
- Location: Şişli, Istanbul, Turkey
- Coordinates: 41°02′40″N 28°59′33″E

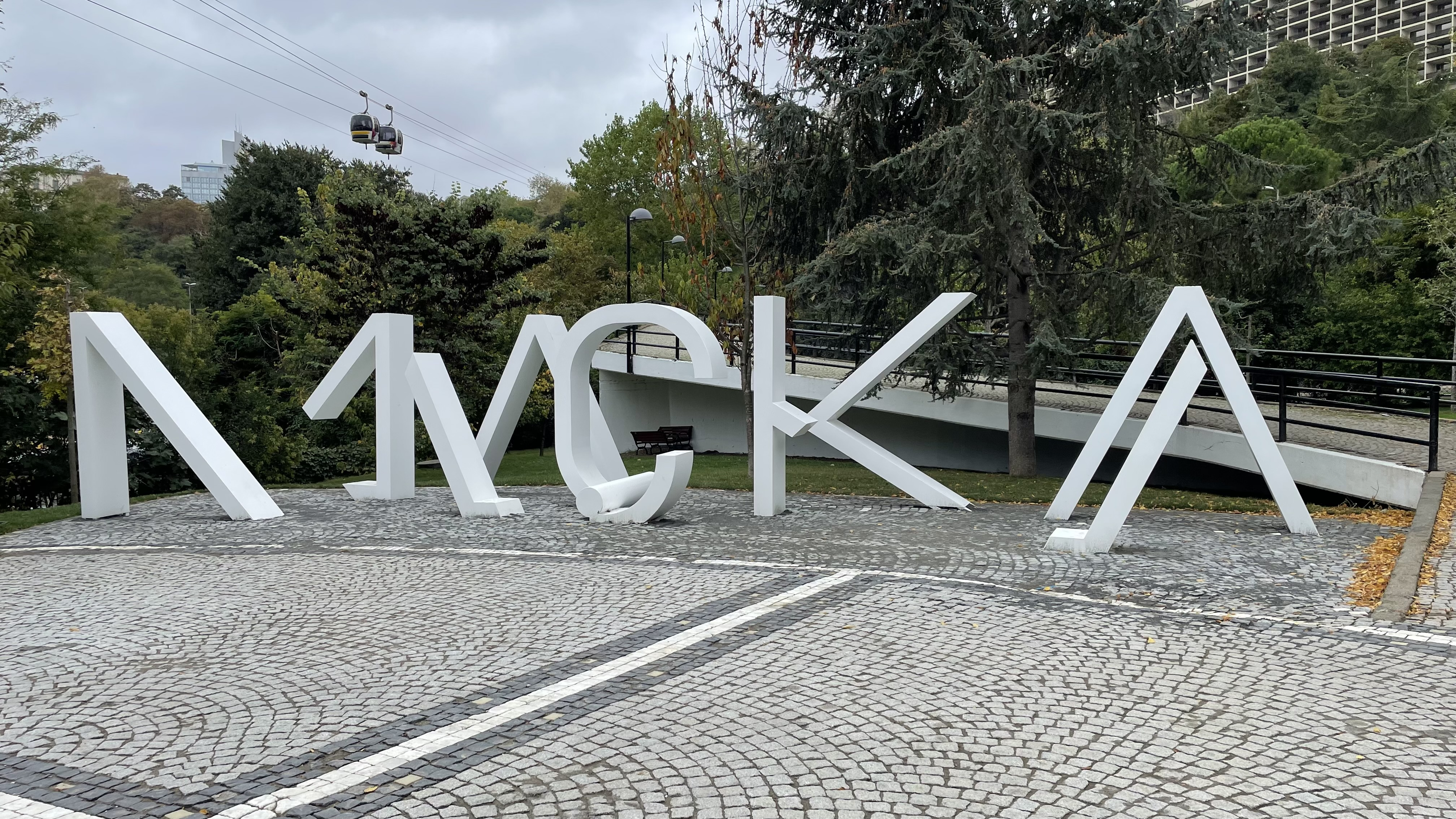
Maçka Park in 2021

Maçka Democracy Park is a recreational area in Istanbul, Turkey, which has paths for jogging, walking and dog walking. It also has children's areas, rest areas and benches and decorative pools.

== History ==
The area was part of the Dolmabahçe Palace's gardens and was separated from the gardens being used as a parkland in the mid-19th century. It had been named as Maçka Park referring to people from the Black Sea region who were sent to Constantinople shortly after the conquest of the region by Mehmed II in 1461. Its name remained as Maçka Park until 1993 when it was renovated and renamed as Maçka Democracy Park.

=== December 2016 bombing ===
On 10 December 2016, the park was the site of a suicide bombing, one of two bombings that day for which the Kurdistan Freedom Hawks claimed responsibility. The suicide bombing killed four police officers and one civilian at the park.
