= Terror attacks in Istanbul =

The following is a list of historical terrorist attacks in Istanbul. Certain periods have seen an increase in political violence in Turkey, such as between 2015 and 2016.

Date	Incident	Deaths	Perpetrator	Ref.
11 August 1976	1976 Yeşilköy airport attack	4	Popular Front for the Liberation of Palestine	
1 May 1977	Taksim Square massacre	34	Counter-Guerrilla	
16 March 1978	Beyazıt massacre	7	Grey Wolves	
6 September 1986	Neve Shalom Synagogue massacre	22	Abu Nidal Organization	
13 March 1999	Blue Market massacre	13	Kurdistan Workers' Party	
13 March 1999	1999 Istanbul bombings	13	Kurdistan Workers' Party	
3 January 2001	January 2001 Istanbul bombing	4	Revolutionary People's Liberation Party/Front	
10 September 2001	September 2001 Istanbul bombing	4	Revolutionary People's Liberation Party/Front	
15 November 2003	2003 Istanbul bombings	55	al-Qaeda	
20 November 2003	2003 Istanbul bombings	55	al-Qaeda	
9 March 2004	2004 attack on Istanbul restaurant	1		
20 May 2004	2004 Acıbadem bombing	0	TİKKO	
19 January 2007	Assassination of Hrant Dink	1	Ogün Samast	
9 July 2008	2008 United States consulate in Istanbul attack	6		
27 July 2008	2008 Istanbul bombings	17		
8 November 2009	2009 Istanbul bus attack	1		
31 October 2010	2010 Istanbul bombing	1 (the perpetrator)	Kurdistan Freedom Hawks	
11 September 2012	2012 Istanbul suicide bombing	2	Revolutionary People's Liberation Party/Front	
1 January 2015	2015 Dolmabahçe Palace attack			
6 January 2015	2015 Istanbul suicide bombing	2	Islamic State	
31 March 2015	Istanbul Justice Palace siege	3	Revolutionary People's Liberation Party/Front	
1 December 2015	Istanbul Metro bombing	0		
23 December 2015	2015 Sabiha Gökçen Airport bombing	1	Kurdistan Freedom Hawks	
12 January 2016	January 2016 Istanbul bombing	14 (including the perpetrator)	Islamic State	
19 March 2016	March 2016 Istanbul bombing	5 (including the perpetrator)		
7 June 2016	June 2016 Istanbul bombing	13 (6 police officers 6 civilians, 1 perpetrator)	Kurdistan Freedom Hawks	
28 June 2016	2016 Istanbul Atatürk Airport attack	45 (not including perpetrators)	Islamic State	
6 October 2016	October 2016 Istanbul bombing	0	Kurdistan Workers' Party	
10 December 2016	December 2016 Istanbul bombings	48 (39 police officers, 7 civilians, 2 perpetrators)	Kurdistan Freedom Hawks	
1 January 2017	2017 Istanbul nightclub attack	39	Islamic State	
2 October 2018	Assassination of Jamal Khashoggi	1	Saudi Government	
13 November 2022	2022 Istanbul bombing	6	Unknown	
