= Istanbul attack =

Istanbul attack may refer to the following:

== Pre-21st century ==
- Occupation of the Ottoman Bank, in 1896
- Yıldız assassination attempt, in 1905
- Istanbul pogrom, in 1955
- Taksim Square massacre, in 1977
- Beyazıt massacre, in 1978
- Neve Shalom Synagogue massacre, in 1986
- 1999 Istanbul bombings (Shopping center, Bahçelievler district)
  - Blue Market massacre

== 21st century ==
=== 2000s ===
- January 2001 Istanbul bombing (Police station, Şişli)
- September 2001 Istanbul bombing (Beyoğlu district)
- 2003 Istanbul bombings (synagogues, HSBC and British consulate)
- 2004 attack on Istanbul restaurant (Kartal district)
- 2004 Acıbadem bombing
- Assassination of Hrant Dink, in 2007
- 2008 United States consulate in Istanbul attack
- 2008 Istanbul bombings (Güngören district)
- 2009 Istanbul bus attack

=== 2010s ===
- 2010 Istanbul bombing (Taksim Square)
- 2012 Istanbul suicide bombing (Sultangazi district)

==== 2015 ====
- 2015 Istanbul suicide bombing (Sultanahmet district)
- Istanbul Justice Palace siege
- 2015 Istanbul metro bombing (Bayrampaşa district)
- 2015 Sabiha Gökçen Airport bombing

==== 2016 ====
- January 2016 Istanbul bombing (Sultanahmet district)
- March 2016 Istanbul bombing (İstiklal Avenue)
- June 2016 Istanbul bombing (Vezneciler district)
- 2016 Atatürk Airport attack
- October 2016 Istanbul bombing (Yenibosna district)
- December 2016 Istanbul bombings (Vodafone Arena)

==== 2017-2019 ====
- Istanbul nightclub shooting, in 2017 (Beşiktaş district)
- Assassination of Jamal Khashoggi, in 2018

=== 2020s ===
- 2022 Istanbul bombing (İstiklal Avenue)
