= 2016 Istanbul bombing =

2016 Istanbul bombing may refer to:

- January 2016 Istanbul bombing
- March 2016 Istanbul bombing
- June 2016 Istanbul bombing
- 2016 Istanbul Atatürk Airport attack
- December 2016 Istanbul bombings
