= 2001 Istanbul suicide bombing =

2001 Istanbul suicide bombing may refer to:

- January 2001 Istanbul bombing
- September 2001 Istanbul bombing
