= Güngören =

- District and municipality
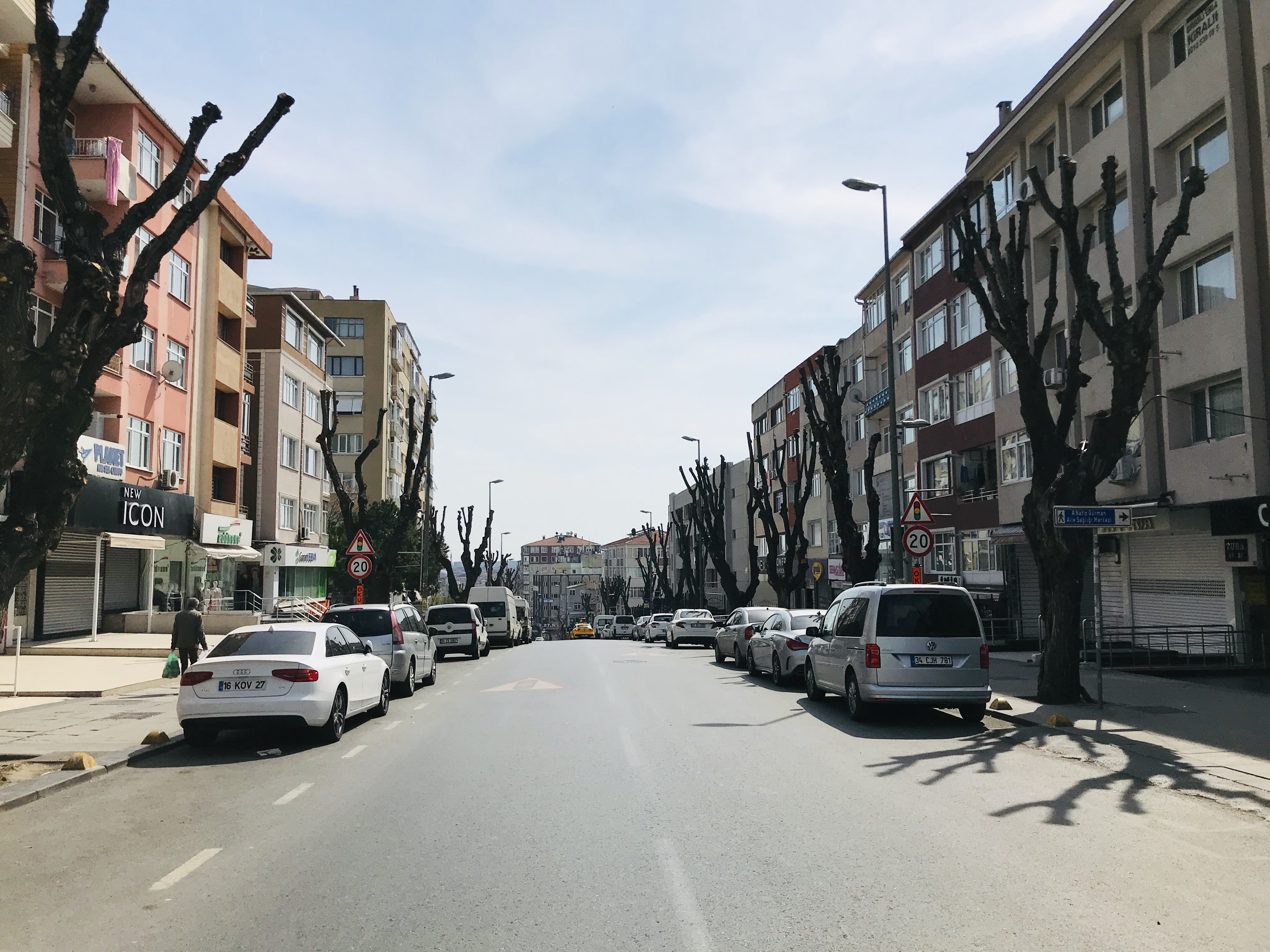
- A street in Güngören

- Logo

- Map showing Güngören District in Istanbul Province

- Location within Turkey Location within Istanbul
- Coordinates: 41°01′21″N 28°52′18″E
- Country: Turkey
- Province: Istanbul

Government
  - Mayor: Bünyamin Demir (AKP)
- Area: 7 km^{2} (2.7 sq mi)
- Population (2022): 282,692
  - Density: 40,000/km^{2} (100,000/sq mi)
- Time zone: UTC+3 (TRT)
- Area code: 0212
- Website: www.gungoren.bel.tr

Güngören is a municipality and district of Istanbul Province, Turkey. Its area is 7 km^{2}, making it the smallest district of Turkey in terms of land area. Its population is 282,692 (2022), down from a peak of 318,545 in 2007. It is an industrial and working class area. It is located near the district of Bakırköy on the Çatalca Peninsula in the western half of Istanbul Province. Güngören, which became a district on June 3, 1992, is adjacent to Zeytinburnu to the east, Esenler, Bakırköy in the south, and Bahçelievler to the west. The district is now fully urbanized and consists of 11 neighborhoods. The mayor is Bünyamin Demir (AKP).

== History ==
Güngören was once primarily farmland set on rolling hills and was known by the village name of Vidos. Güngören, like neighboring Zeytinburnu and Bağcılar have grown rapidly since the 1950s and in a largely unplanned way which has caused significant quality of life issues. Informally built gecekondu have been replaced with more formal apartment blocks while vacant land has been transformed into trade zones and industrial parks. The majority of the population is made up of migrants who arrived from rural Anatolia.

As metropolitan Istanbul grew, the national government developed State road D.100 which runs through the center of the district. The construction of the highway led to the demolition of hundreds of informally built housing units but also made travel through the region significantly easier. In 1992, the T1 line of the Istanbul Tram was extended through the neighborhood towards its terminus in Bağcılar. The area is now served extensively by the Metrobus, M1A line of the Istanbul Metro and the Istanbul Tram. Despite the evolution of the district into a formally built urban area serviced by the Istanbul Metropolitan Municipality it remains at high risk of damage due to earthquakes. The area is increasingly the focus of both the national and municipal governments for reconstruction and retrofitting of existing structures in order to mitigate risk of collapse.

Güngören is a district with a variety of socio-economic issues including poverty, joblessness, poor education, pollution, poor quality construction and lack of green space. While originally catering to migrants from Anatolia, the area is now home to a growing population of people from Afghanistan, Xinjiang and Syria. The district was the site of the 2008 Istanbul bombings. The area is hard to distinguish from neighboring districts. The southern and eastern part of the district along the D100 Highway is known as Merter and is primarily industrial. The northern and western parts of the district and primarily residential. In the center of the district is the large Kale Shopping Center. Along the eastern border of the district is Yıldız Technical University.

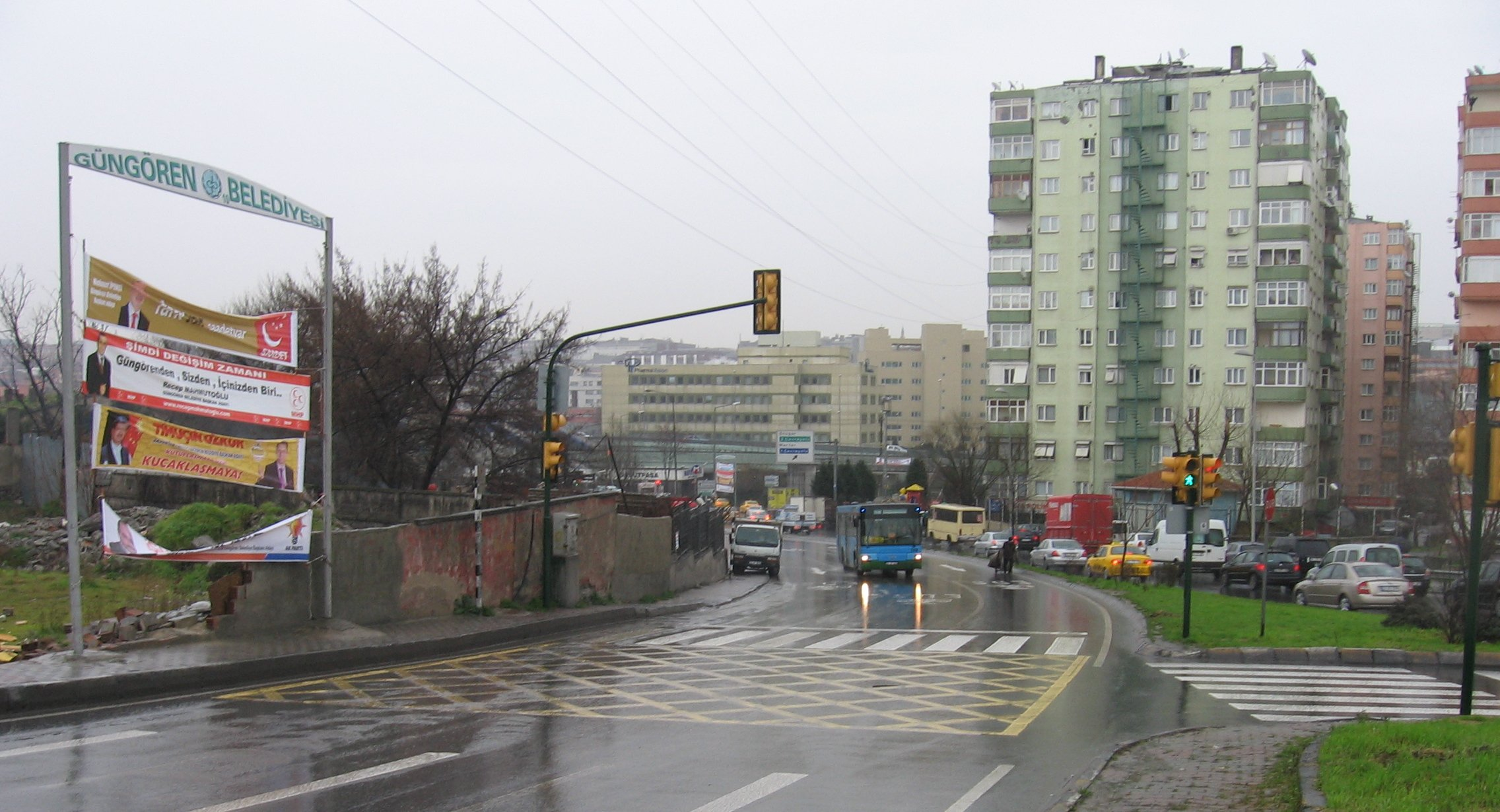
A typical arterial road in Güngören

== Composition ==
There are 11 neighbourhoods in Güngören District:

- Abdurrahman Nafiz Gürman
- Akıncılar
- Gençosman
- Güneştepe
- Güven
- Haznedar
- Mareşal Çakmak
- Mehmet Nesih Özmen
- Merkez
- Sanayi
- Tozkoparan

== Population ==
The population of Güngören has grown rapidly in the last 70 years. The area recorded a population of 259 in 1935 rising to a peak of 318,545 in 2007. Population growth was particularly pronounced between 1970 and 2000 when the population grew from 20,000 to 180,000. The district is now fully built out and has seen population decline as families have left cramped and poorly built structures and depart for more spacious, modern and better built suburban residential districts that are now accessible thanks to the expansion of the Istanbul Metro.

Historical population
Year	Pop.	±% p.a.
1997	273,915	—
2007	318,545	+1.52%
2012	307,573	−0.70%
2017	296,967	−0.70%
2022	282,692	−0.98%
Source: Population census (1997) and TÜIK (2007-2022)

== Sports ==
The Tozkoparan Olympic Swimming Pool is one of the four Olympic-size swimming pools in Istanbul. Güngören also has amateur football clubs belonging to districts such as Istanbul Güngörenspor, Haznedarspor, Tozkoparanspor and Güneştepespor which all play in the Istanbul amateur league.

== Reaction to Recep İvedik ==
Güngören is the hometown of the main character of a 2008 Turkish comedy film, directed by Togan Gökbakar. The main character is an oafish man played by Şahan Gökbakar. The portrayal is partially based on cultural attitudes and stereotypes in Istanbul and Turkey about Güngören's socio-economic identity.

Some residents of Güngören were displeased with the portrayal of the character and the community in the film. We are uneasy that our district is being mentioned by a character like İvedik, proclaimed Abdullah Yılmaz, the president of the Youth Council for Güngören District, in response to the release of the film Recep İvedik 3 which featured a "red neck" comedy character portrayed as residing in the district. Güngören is a district where educated and intellectual people live. It is not right to associate Güngören with an impolite character who does not know any manners, he continued before stating that the council would take action to prevent the district from being mentioned in a fourth film in the series.
