= Abis Rizvi =

Indian businessman and film producer

- Born: Abis Hasan Rizvi; 27 February 1968; Bandra, West Mumbai, Maharashtra, India
- Died: 1 January 2017 (aged 48); Istanbul, Turkey
- Cause of death: Gunshot wounds
- Occupations: Businessman; film producer; screenwriter
- Years active: 2013–2016
- Notable work: Roar: Tigers of the Sundarbans (2014)

Abis Hasan Rizvi (27 February 1968 – 1 January 2017) was an Indian businessman, film producer, and screenwriter.

== Life ==
=== Early life ===
Rizvi was born to Dr. Akhtar Hassan Rizvi, a former member of the Rajya Sabha in Bandra, West Mumbai, Maharashtra. Rizvi lived in Mumbai with his wife and son. Rizvi was director of the Rizvi Group and CEO of his father's real estate company Rizvi Builders. His uncle Sibte Hassan Rizvi directed the films Khamoshi (1986) and Joshilay (1989). His cousin Anjum Rizvi is the producer of Ahista Ahista (2006) and A Wednesday (2008).

=== Film career ===
Rizvi was producer and co-writer of the Indian feature films Roar: Tigers of the Sundarbans (2014) and bilingual Hindi-Punjabi docu-drama He-Man (2016). He worked last on the drama film T for Taj Mahal. He was founder of film company ARF Films (Abis Rizvi Films), the company behind the latter two films.

== Death ==
While on holiday in Turkey with friends, Rizvi was shot and killed during a terrorist attack in the Reina nightclub in Istanbul on 1 January 2017, in which 38 other people were also killed.

== Filmography ==
=== Movies Produced ===
Year	Title
2014	Roar: Tigers of the Sundarbans
2016	He-man
2017	T for Taj Mahal
