= Varinder Singh Ghuman =

Indian bodybuilder (1983 or 1984 – 2025)

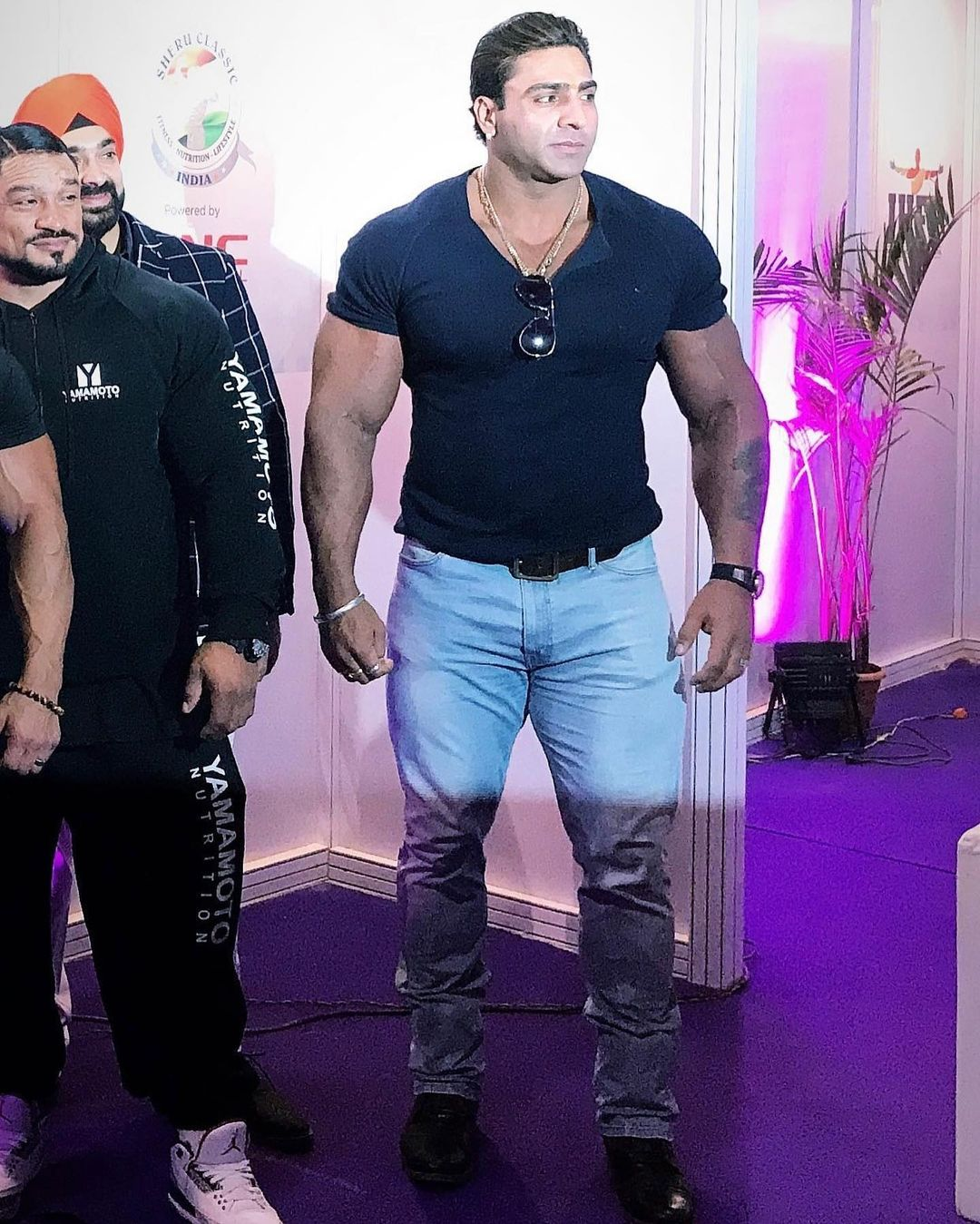
- Born: 1983 or 1984
- Died: 9 October 2025 (aged 41-42); Amritsar, Punjab, India
- Occupations: Bodybuilder; actor
- Known for: Mr. India
- Professional bodybuilder

Best statistics
- Height: 6 ft 2 in (188 cm)
- Weight: 130 kg (287 lb)

Professional (Pro) career
- Best win: Mr. India; 2009

Varinder Singh Ghuman (1983 or 1984 – 9 October 2025) was an Indian professional bodybuilder and actor. Ghuman won Mr. India in 2009 and he was awarded 2nd place in Mr. Asia.

== Background ==
Ghuman was born in 1983 or 1984, and hailed from Gurdaspur, Punjab, and has been described as the world's first vegetarian professional bodybuilder.

== Career ==
=== Bodybuilding ===
In 2009, Ghuman won Mr. India competition and secured second place in Mr. Asia. He was hired by Arnold Schwarzenegger for promoting his health products in Asia as his brand ambassador. He was the first Indian bodybuilder to secure the IFBB pro card.

=== Film ===
Ghuman appeared in the 2012 Punjabi film Kabaddi Once Again as the lead actor.

He made his Hindi film debut with the 2014 film Roar: Tigers of the Sundarbans. In 2019, Ghuman appeared in the Hindi film Marjaavaan.

Ghuman's final role was in Tiger 3.

== Death ==
On 9 October 2025, Ghuman travelled to Fortis Hospital in Amritsar for treatment. However, he suffered a heart attack during the procedure and could not be resuscitated.

== Filmography ==
Year	Film	Role	Language	Ref
2012	Kabaddi Once Again	Shingara Singh	Punjabi	
2014	Roar: Tigers of the Sundarbans	Cheena	Hindi	
2019	Marjaavaan	Rakka	Hindi	
2023	Tiger 3	Shakeel	Hindi	
