= List of terrorist incidents in 1999 =

This is a timeline of incidents in 1999 that have been labelled as "terrorism" and are not believed to have been carried out by a government or its forces (see state terrorism and state-sponsored terrorism).

== Guidelines ==
- To be included, entries must be notable (have a stand-alone article) and described by a consensus of reliable sources as "terrorism".
- List entries must comply with the guidelines outlined in the manual of style under MOS:TERRORIST.
- Casualty figures in this list are the total casualties of the incident including immediate casualties and later casualties (such as people who succumbed to their wounds long after the attacks occurred).
- Casualties listed are the victims. Perpetrator casualties are listed separately (e.g. x (+y) indicate that x victims and y perpetrators were killed/injured).
- Casualty totals may be underestimated or unavailable due to a lack of information. A figure with a plus (+) sign indicates that at least that many people have died (e.g. 10+ indicates that at least 10 people have died) – the actual toll could be considerably higher. A figure with a plus (+) sign may also indicate that over that number of people are victims.
- If casualty figures are 20 or more, they will be shown in **bold**. In addition, figures for casualties more than 50 will also be **underlined**.
- Incidents are limited to one per location per day. If multiple attacks occur in the same place on the same day, they will be merged into a single incident.
- In addition to the guidelines above, the table also includes the following categories:

0 people were killed/injured by the incident.
1–19 people were killed/injured by the incident.
20–49 people were killed/injured by the incident.
50–99 people were killed/injured by the incident.
100+ people were killed/injured by the incident.

== List ==
Date	Type	Dead	Injured	Location	Details	Perpetrators	Part of
Feb 16	Car bombings	16	120	Tashkent, Uzbekistan	1999 Tashkent bombings: Six car bombs targeting government buildings and President Islam Karimov exploded over the course of an hour and a half.	IMU	Islamic terrorism
Mar 6	Bombing	10	150	Jessore, Bangladesh	1999 Jessore bombings: Islamist group Harkat-ul-Jihad al-Islami used two time bombs to attack Bangladesh Udichi Shilpigoshthi, killing 10 people and injuring another 150.	Harkat-ul-Jihad al-Islami	Terrorism in Bangladesh
Mar 13 & 14	Arson, bombing	13	6 (+1)	Istanbul, Turkey	1999 Istanbul bombings: Two bombings at a shopping centre (Blue Market massacre) and one under a car killed 13 and wounded seven others. The PKK was blamed.	PKK	Kurdish–Turkish conflict
Mar 19	Bombing	62	168	Vladikavkaz, Russia	1999 Vladikavkaz bombing: Four young Chechen men of the Chechen Republic of Ichkeria detonated a bomb in a crowded market, killing 62 people. They also committed two other bombings of a Russian military housing complex and a train station and also kidnapped four Russian soldiers later in 1999.	CRI	Terrorism in Russia
Apr 17-30	Bombings	3	140	London, United Kingdom	1999 London nail bombings: Neo-Nazi David Copeland detonated three nail bombs. The first bombing occurred on 17 April in Brixton and targeted black people. 48 people were injured. The second bombing, on April 24, targeted Bengalis on Brick Lane and wounded 13. The final bombing occurred on 30 April in Soho at a gay bar called the Admiral Duncan. Three people, including a pregnant woman, were killed and 79 were injured. Copeland told police he hoped the bombings would spark a race war.	David Copeland	Terrorism in United Kingdom
Aug 10	Mass shooting	1	5	Los Angeles, United States	Los Angeles Jewish Community Center shooting: Aryan Nations member Buford O. Furrow opened fire on a Jewish community center, wounding an elderly secretary, a teenage counselor and three young boys. After fleeing, Furrow murdered a Filipino-American mail carrier and then took a taxi to Las Vegas, where he surrendered to authorities.	Aryan Nations	Terrorism in the United States
Aug 31	Bombing	1	40	Moscow, Russia	Russian apartment bombings#Manzhnaya Square, Moscow: A bomb exploded at a mall, killing one person and injuring 40 others.	Islamic Djamaat of Dagestan	War of Dagestan
Sep 4-16	Bombings	293	1,000+	Russia	Russian apartment bombings: A series of bombings at apartment buildings. The first occurred on 4 September in Buynaksk, Dagestan, the next bombings occurred in Moscow on the 9th and 13th. The final bombing occurred on the 16th in Volgodonsk. Overall, 293 people were killed and over 1,000 more were wounded. The government blamed the Chechen Republic of Ichkeria for the blasts, however, many Chechen separatists as well several Russian journalists have accused the Federal Security Service of Russia of staging these bombings as a false flag in order in bring Vladimir Putin into power and garner support for the Second Chechen War, which had just commenced.	Disputed	Second Chechen War
Sep 18	Massacre	54		Ampara District, Sri Lanka	Gonagala massacre: LTTE cadres massacre at least 50 Sinhalese civilians in Gonagala.	LTTE	Sri Lankan Civil War
Oct 7	Hostage taking	0	0	Bangkok, Thailand	1999 Myanmar Embassy siege: A group of militants from the Vigorous Burmese Student Warriors took 89 people hostage at the Myanmar embassy. The attackers released all of the hostages and escaped without bloodshed.	VBSW	Internal conflict in Myanmar

== See also ==
- List of terrorist incidents
