= 1999 Istanbul bombings =

Terrorist incident in Turkey

- Location: Istanbul, Turkey (geographical coordinates 41.01224°N 28.976018°E)
- Date: March 13 and 14, 1999 (UTC+2)
- Attack type: Bombings and arson attack
- Deaths: 13

The 1999 Istanbul bombings were a pair of bombings that took place in Istanbul, Turkey on March 13, killing 13, and March 14, 1999, injuring two. A third bomb was found in a Burger King outlet but successfully defused.

A Turkish court sentenced Cevat Soysal to 18 years and nine months in prison on June 25, 2002, for allegedly having ordered the attack.

== The attacks ==
- Blue Market massacre: The March 13 attack involved three terrorists ran inside and placed the first bomb in a shopping center, then they forced people up the stairs and on the top floor. The flame and fumes went upwards roaring higher and higher. The flames engulfed the five-story building shattering windows of the shopping mall. People were hiding in the attic, but there was no ventilation; the fumes of the fire eventually killed them due to suffocation. The terrorists fled the scene with police trailing them. Crowds became aware of what was happening and began chanting "death to the PKK."
- On March 14, 1999, the second bombing, was when a terrorist quickly dropped a bomb under a car and ran. When it blew up it injured a police officer and, supposedly the terrorist did not run fast enough and was caught in the blast and was injured as well. The third bomb was captured and swiftly defused in a fast food restaurant and there were no casualties.

== Aftermath ==
These three events caused widespread fear and anger among the people of Turkey and brought more attention to the Kurdish PKK party, who were blamed for the bombings; in the aftermath, one of their leader, Cevat Soysal, was taken to court. The media called the PKK and its leaders "terrorist," "traitors to their country," and "insidious." These events also disrupted financial inflows to Turkey because the bombings were focused on very busy areas, and resulted in tourist warnings being issued.

Authorities arrested several people suspected of involvement in the bombings, most notably Cevat Soysal. "Cevat Soysal was taken into custody by authorities under the suspicion of being a leader in the PKK on 13 July 1999 in Chișinău, Moldova. The indictment said that he had been in contact with Abdullah Ocalan, the leader of the PKK, and allegedly provided Mr. Ocalan with information about people he had trained to commit violent acts. An accusation based on a number of phone calls from Soysal's phone that were recorded through wiretap. The prosecution claimed that after the arrest of Mr. Ocalan, Soysal ordered a series of violent acts to occur, including the bombings of Marvi Carsi on March 13 and March 14. The courts tried to pin these two incidents on Soysal but could not. These accusations did not hold up because of how general Soysal spoke over the recorded phone calls.

During the trial, Soysal's lawyer asked for the phone log recording between Soysal and the other supposed people. The court denied him access to these recording on multiple occasions. The prosecution then sought out a verbal sample to compare to the recording they already had but Soysal refused since he was not allowed to hear the recording that were being used as evidence. Soysal also asked for the criminal case concerning the bombing of Marvi Carsi but that was denied as well. Soysal's lawyer petitioned for access to these files and recordings every court date but it kept getting denied. The reason it kept being declined was that it had already been denied before. At the end of the court dates Soysal was convicted of membership of the PKK under Article 168 1 of the former Criminal Code and sentenced to eighteen years and nine months' imprisonment. The court trials lasted from 1999 to 2002.

The Soysal trial was widely criticized, largely because most of the expert opinion on the evidence was provided by police officers, who were accused of being biased because many police officers died in the bombings. The court was also criticized for failing to get an unbiased expert that would satisfy both sides., and after the case, the PKK targeted the police more aggressively with bombs. One was a suicide bomber that walked up to a group of police and set off her bombs killing multiple police and civilian. A couple of her bombs did not go off and were defused by experts afterward. The next bombing was on a police bus again in a busy area. The bomber set of the bombs on the side of the bus killing several police officers. Similar bombings continued for some time. Eventually, on 30 November 2008, Cevat Soysal was released from prison on probation and returned to Germany, where his family was living.

== See also ==
- 2003 Istanbul bombings
- 2008 Istanbul bombings
- 2022 Istanbul bombing
- List of terrorist incidents, 1999
