= Tozkoparan Olympic Swimming Pool =

Swimming pool in Istanbul, Turkey

Tozkopran Olympic Swimming Pool
- Location within Istanbul
- Location: Cevat Açıkalın Cad., Erdemli Sok. 4, Güngören Istanbul, Turkey
- Coordinates: 41°00′46″N 28°53′42″E
- Owner: Ministry of Youth and Sports
- Operator: Turkish Swimming Federation
- Capacity: 1,034

Construction
- Opened: 2012

Tozkoparan Olympic Swimming Pool (Turkish: Tozkoparan Olimpik Yüzme Havuzu) is an Olympic-size swimming pool in Istanbul, Turkey.

The swimming pool is situated in Cevat Açıkalın Cad., Erdemli Sok. 4, at Tozkoparan neighborhood of Güngören district in Istanbul. Owned by the Ministry of Youth and Sports, it was opened in 2012. The operator is the Turkish Swimming Federation.

The swimming pool with ten lanes is 50 m (160 ft) long and 2.20 m (7.2 ft) deep. The venue has a seating capacity for 1,034 spectators.

The swimming pool is part of a sports complex, which has a 500-seat capacity sports hall for basketball, volleyball and table tennis events.
