= Operation Claw-Sword =

Turkish airstrikes in Turkish-Kurdish conflict

- Part of the Turkish–Kurdish conflict, Syrian Civil war, the Turkish involvement in the Syrian civil war, and the Syrian–Turkish border clashes during the Syrian Civil War
Date	20–28 November 2022 (1 week and 1 day)
Location	Northern and eastern Syria and northern Iraq

Belligerents
Turkey	In Syria: Autonomous Administration of North and East Syria; Syrian Arab Republic; In Iraq: PKK

Units involved
Turkish Armed Forces; Turkish Air Force; Turkish Land Forces (artillery support)	Syrian Democratic Forces; People's Protection Units (YPG); Anti-Terror Units (YAT); Manbij Military Council; Syrian Armed Forces; Syrian Army

Casualties and losses
Per SOHR: (Turkey) 1 killed, 7 injured Per Turkey: None	Per SOHR: 35 killed (Syria) 30 killed Per Turkey: 364 killed or wounded
- 10 Syrian civilians killed by Turkish shelling and airstrikes 5 Syrian and 2 Turkish civilians killed by SDF/SAA shelling

On 20 November 2022 the Turkish Air Force launched Operation Claw-Sword (Turkish: Pençe-Kılıç Operasyonu), a series of airstrikes against Syrian Democratic Forces and Syrian Army positions in Northern Syria (in Aleppo, Raqqa, al-Hasaka) and against Kurdistan Workers' Party (PKK) positions in Northern Iraq. The airstrikes were launched following the 2022 Istanbul bombing on 13 November, that the Turkish government say was conducted by Kurdish separatists.

== Operation ==
On 20 November around midnight local time Turkish aircraft launched a series of airstrikes across northern Syria and Iraq, killing 36 SDF fighters and Syrian soldiers and Hawar News Agency reporter, Essam Abdullah in Syria.

On 21 November two Turkish civilians were killed in Karkamış, by a rocket attack believed to be conducted by the SDF. Also according to SOHR one Turkish soldier was killed and 7 were injured in Bab Al-Salama crossing on the borders with Turkey, after shelling from Kurdish and regime areas in northern Aleppo.

On 22–23 November Turkish Air Force targeted the oil and gas energy infrastructure in al-Hasakah Governorate. Turkish Air Force targeted the town of Makman in north west Deir ez-Zor Governorate.

On 23 November clashes broke out between forces of the Manbij Military Council and forces of the Turkish-backed Syrian National Army on the Jamousiya and Sayada fronts in the Manbij countryside. Eight SDF fighters were killed after Turkish aircraft targeted the vicinity of Al-Hawl refugee camp.

On 27 November Turkish Air Force resumed bombing SDF and Syrian Army positions in Northern Syria after a three-day halt in airstrikes. During these attacks five Syrian soldiers were killed after a Turkish drone struck their military post, near the Kashtar village in the Afrin countryside.

== Aftermath ==
On 29–30 November Syrian government forces and Iranian backed militias deployed T-90 tanks, troop carriers and hundreds of soldiers to the northern Aleppo countryside. Russian forces established a military post south of the village of Ablah, consisting of dozens of soldiers and field artillery.

On 6 December, Al Jazeera reported that Turkey had set a deadline of 2 weeks for SDF forces to leave the areas of Manbij, Tell Rifat and Kobani and that a failure to do so would result in a new ground offensive.

On 19 December, Turkish forces resumed their joint patrols with Russian forces under the second Northern Syria Buffer Zone, which had been suspended since the start of the operation.

== Reactions ==
=== Domestic ===
Turkey: President Tayyip Erdogan said that Turkey's air operations against a Kurdish militia in northern Syria were only the beginning and it would launch a land operation when convenient. On 28 November, Turkish officials announced that Turkish forces would need 'just days' to be ready for a ground incursion into Syria.

AANES: Syrian Democratic Forces commander-in-chief Mazloum Abdi suspended military operations against the Islamic State to focus on preparations for a potential Turkish ground incursion into northern Syria. Abdi said he believed the city of Kobanî would become targeted by Turkish forces. On 28 November, Mazloum Abdi told Reuters that SDF forces had noted Turkish reinforcements accumulating on the border with Syria and in already occupied parts of Syria.

=== International ===
Iran: Ayatollah Ali Khamenei gave a warning to Erdogan. Stating that a military conflict would "harmful" for Turkey and Syria and the entire region. A Lebanese official speaking to AP claimed that Iran was attempting to lead a mediation by arranging a meeting between the Syrian President Bashar al-Assad and Turkish President Tayyip Erdogan. However, a senior Turkish government official denied any Iranian mediation, saying that Tehran was "antagonistic" toward Turkey in Syria and that it was Russia that pushed Turkey toward reconciliation but that there was "no progress at all."

Russia: Russian presidential envoy in Syria, Alexander Lavrentyev, called on Turkey to show restraint in its use of "excessive" military force in Syria and to keep tensions from escalating.

United States: The Pentagon opposes any military action by Turkey according to VOA. National Security Council spokesperson John Kirby said during a news conference: Turkey has a legitimate right to defend itself and its citizens, but added cross-border operations "might force a reaction by some of our SDF partners that would limit and constrain their ability to fight against ISIS...and we want to be able to keep the pressure on ISIS." The Department of Defense of the United States urged de-escalation, stating it was "deeply concerned" by Turkish actions in Iraq and Syria, and with Turkish airstrikes near coalition bases. The statement ended with a statement on the discussion of a ceasefire.

United Nations: The UN has stated that all parties should abide by international law and maximum restraint. The UN has taken the position there is no military solution to the conflict in Syria.

Pro-Kurdish protests were held in Cyprus, Germany and Sweden, following the airstrikes. Danish politician Nikolaj Villumsen, Austrian politician Andreas Schieder and The Left in the European Parliament – GUE/NGL have condemned the airstrikes. Human Rights Watch stated that the airstrikes "risk making an already unbearable situation much worse for Kurds, Arabs, and other communities" and "displaced families, caused significant power cuts and fuel shortages, forced aid organizations to temporarily suspend certain activities, and led to school and work disruptions."
