= June 2016 Midyat bombing =

Terrorist incident in Turkey

Midyat car bombing
- Part of Kurdish–Turkish conflict
- Location: Midyat, Mardin Province, Turkey
- Date: 8 June 2016
- Target: Midyat police station
- Attack type: Car bomb
- Deaths: 5 (2 police officers and 3 civilians)
- Injuries: 30
- Motive: Turkish attacks on PKK targets in Iraq and southeastern Turkey on Tuesday (suspected)

On June 8, a car bomb exploded in the Kurdish town of Midyat, in the southeastern Mardin Province. It happened in close proximity to Midyat's police office, drawing parallels with the June 2016 Istanbul bombing just one day prior. Five people were killed in the blast – two police officers and three civilians – with 30 others being injured. Turkish Prime Minister Binali Yildirim blamed the bombing on the PKK.

Two reporters from the US state-funded Voice of America were attacked by local residents when investigating the scene.
