= Himarsha Venkatsamy =

South African model and actress

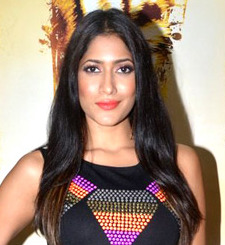
- Venkatsamy in 2014
- Born: 15 February 1984 (age 42); Durban, South Africa
- Education: University of the Witwatersrand
- Occupations: Actress, model, television host
- Spouse: Abdulkadir Arsenalist

Himarsha Venkatsamy is a South African model and actress, known for winning the Kingfisher Calendar Hunt in 2010, defeating Anjali Lavania and Nidhi Sunil in the final round.

She made a special appearance in the 2010 Bollywood romantic comedy I Hate Luv Storys, but her first breakthrough came when she was roped to play Jhumpa in the thriller film Roar: Tigers of the Sundarbans.

== Early life ==
Himarsha was born to South African parents of South Indian origin in Durban, South Africa. She has been a model since the age of 13, when she began dancing at the Durban school she was attending where she was studying art and music. She is married to her long-time Kenyan boyfriend, Abdulkadir Arsenalist.

== Career ==
Himarsha participated in the Kingfisher Calendar Girl Hunt 2009 along with her sister Terushka. She won the contest that was televised on NDTV Good Times. She studied for a physiotherapist at the University of the Witwatersrand, before leaving for India to be a full-time model. She has been a part of the Lakme Fashion Week 2009.

== Filmography ==
- Note: all films are in Hindi, unless otherwise noted.

Year	Film	Role	Notes
2010	I Hate Luv Storys		Uncredited role
2015	Roar: Tigers of the Sundarbans	Jhumpa	
2016	Veeram	Unniyarcha	Simultaneously shot in Malayalam and English
2018	Black Bud	Sanya Malhotra	
