= 2022 Istanbul bombing =

Terrorist attack in Turkey

- Part of Terrorism in Turkey
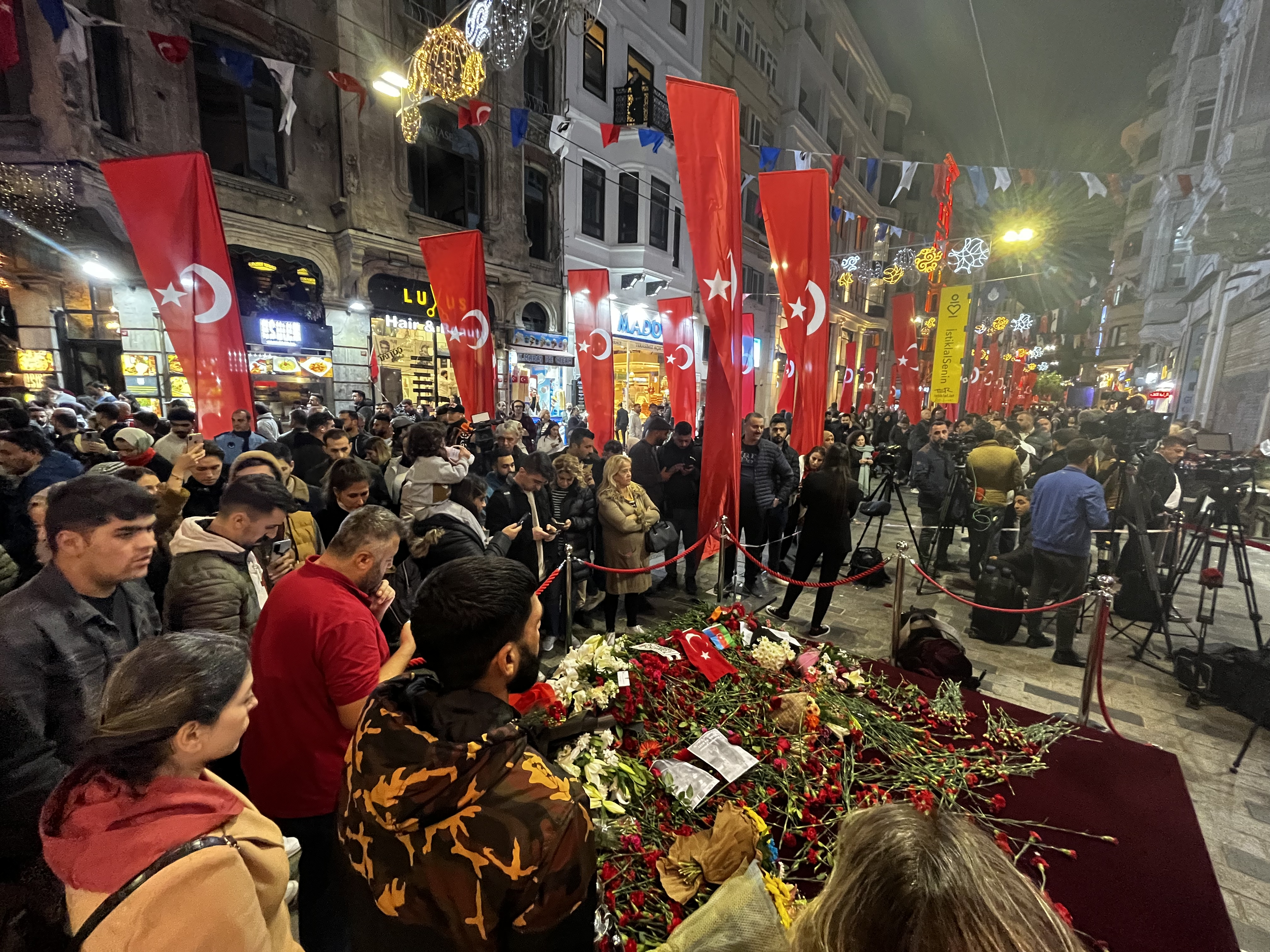
- Memorial point after the attack
- Date: 13 November 2022
- Time: 16:20 (TRT)
- Location: İstiklal Avenue, Beyoğlu, Istanbul, Turkey; 41°02′06″N 28°58′53″E
- Perpetrators: Ahlam Albashir Supported by: PKK (alleged by Turkey and confessed by Ahlam Albashir, denied by the PKK); Islamic State (IS) (possibility included by some Turkish officials)
- Deaths: 6
- Injuries: 81

A terrorist attack occurred on İstiklal Avenue in the Beyoğlu district of Istanbul, Turkey, on 13 November 2022, killing 6 people and injuring 81 others.

No group has claimed responsibility, but Turkish authorities announced that Kurdish separatists were behind the attack, implicating the Kurdistan Workers' Party (PKK) and the Syrian Kurdish Syrian Democratic Forces (SDF). Turkey's interior minister, Süleyman Soylu, announced the arrest of the bomber and forty-six others.

The city experienced previous terrorist attacks during the late 20th and early 21st century by Kurdish separatists and Islamist insurgents. An Islamic State suicide bombing in the same district killed four people in 2016.

PKK, and SDF denied involvements in the bombing. On 20 November, Turkey launched Operation Claw-Sword, bombing nearly 500 targets in Syria and Iraq.

== Background ==
During the late 20th and early 21st century, Islamists and Kurdish nationalists carried out many attacks in Istanbul, including a suicide bombing attack in March 2016 in İstiklal Avenue, which killed five people.

=== Islamic State-Turkey conflict ===
The last attack by Islamic State in Turkey was a mass shooting in Ortaköy, Beşiktaş, Istanbul, in 2017, in which 39 people were killed.

=== PKK-Turkey conflict ===
For decades, the Kurdistan Workers' Party (PKK) has led an insurgency in Turkey, demanding Kurdish self-rule in southeastern Turkey. An estimated 45,000 and 15,000 people have been killed in the conflict in Turkey and in its southern neighbor countries, respectively. PKK is considered a terrorist organization by Turkey, the European Union, and the United States. The People's Defense Units (YPG) are a Syrian Kurdish group related to Turkey's PKK while part of the Syrian Democratic Forces (SDF) which controls northeastern Syria; both YPG and SDF are supported by the US, leading to tensions between Turkey and the US. The 2013–2015 ceasefire supported by Erdogan and PKK gave hope for a long-term peace to the conflict in Turkey. In June 2015, the parliamentary elections delivered AKP's government a major defeat, losing its majority, while pro-Kurdish-rights HDP made notable progresses. Soon after, the Ceylanpınar incident was considered a casus belli to return to full scale confrontation, resulting in much higher monthly death tolls. Erdogan conveyed the November 2015 snap elections, regaining AKP's majority through security concerns. Since the 2016 Turkish coup attempt and the following purges, political discourse, media, public speech as well as academic and judiciary voices are heavily monitored, with nearly no possible opposition to governmental discourse. While the intensity of the PKK-Turkey conflict in Turkey decrease in recent years, since 2015, Turkey lead nearly 12 external military operations resulting in the deaths of an estimated 15,000 neighbouring citizens.

As of 2022, Turkey is heading toward its 2023 Turkish general election which is expected to be a major challenge for the AKP party due to economic slowdown and very high inflation. In the past decade, Erdoğan and the AKP government used anti-PKK, security, martial rhetoric and external operations to raise Turkish nationalist votes before elections. In between, security concerns and anti-terrorism laws have been used to repress and neutralize elected oppositions. Opposition HDP elected officials are systematically probed, arrested, dismissed based on tenuous accusations, to then be replaced by pro-government AKP appointees.

In April 2022, as Turkey continued Operation Claw-Lock and strikes against PKK and YPG targets, senior Kurdistan Workers' Party (PKK) commander, Duran Kalkan publicly said: "We will attack everywhere in Turkey. Not only military targets and military positions, but large cities. Areas they don't expect will become war zones" unless Turkey halts its operations. Since May 2022, Recep Tayyip Erdoğan and his government have called for new external ground operations toward autonomous territories in Syria and ramped up attacks on the area. The PKK, SDF, and the YPG have denied any involvement and the AANES accused Turkey with having used such attacks as a pretext for invasions in the past.

== Bombing ==
The explosion occurred at 4:13 pm on 13 November 2022, on İstiklal Avenue in Beyoğlu, in the European part of Istanbul. İstiklal Avenue is a popular tourist street and one of the main roads leading to Taksim Square. The bomb went off in front of a shopping store. At the time of the blast, the area was more crowded than normal, as a football club was preparing to play nearby. According to Turkish news portal OdaTV, the explosion was caused by an improvised explosive device containing TNT. The blast caused windows to break and images circulating on social media showed people bleeding. Firefighters and ambulances rushed to the scene. The police set up a perimeter around the scene around the bombing site and banned people from going to İstiklal Avenue and Taksim Square.

== Victims ==
Six people were killed and at least 81 others were injured by the explosion. The dead were all Turkish citizens: a man and his nine-year-old daughter; a woman and her teenage daughter; and a married couple. Of the 81 treated in hospital, 61 were released. By 15 November, twenty were still being treated in hospital.

== Investigation ==
=== State investigation ===
Istanbul's Chief Public Prosecutors' Office quickly opened an investigation after the attack, and at least eight prosecutors have been assigned to the case. Justice Minister Bekir Bozdağ said a woman was filmed sitting on a bench for about 40 minutes and that she left shortly before the blast. The arrest of the main suspect in the attack, Ahlam Albashir, a female Syrian national, was reported a day after the bombing. She had been working in the textile industry in Esenler district in Istanbul. Several of her co-workers were also detained and questioned. Two human traffickers who are suspected to have been trying to bring the suspect to Bulgaria were also detained. Since the attack, forty-nine people were detained and interrogated by twenty-nine prosecutors. On 18 November 2022, against seventeen people including the main suspect Ahlam Albashir arrest warrants have been issued. One alleged accomplice of Albashir fled to Azaz, which is a Syrian town controlled by Turkey, where he was captured by the Turkish forces.

The Turkish police said Albashir confirmed her affiliation with PKK and YPG, and that she had been trained by them as a special intelligence officer in Syria, entering Turkey through Afrin District. During her interrogation she admitted having met her contact in Manbij, a city governed by the Autonomous Administration of North and East Syria (AANES) and on his orders travelled to Idlib where she met a man with whom she pretended to be married. They crossed the border to Turkey on 27 July 2022, her alleged partner bringing a bomb with him. They travelled to Istanbul the same day.

=== Kurdish forces denials and investigation ===
The PKK, SDF, and the YPG have denied any involvement and the AANES accused Turkey with having used such attacks as a pretext for invasions in the past. SDF and YPG, via Mazloum Abdi, denounced the attack.

On 22 November, SDF top military official Mazloum Abdi claimed the bomber, Albashir, to be related to IS jihadists via her brothers and past husbands, some of whom were killed in battles against Kurdish forces. More recently, she was inhabiting Turkey-controlled area within North-Western Syria. Abdi called for peace between Turkey and Syrian Kurds, excluding any operation against Turkey in Turkey, and denying responsibility for the bombing. He vowed however to defend Syrian territories under AANES control. He also deplores Erdogan's electoral strategy, preferring war and tension over a peace agreement with his forces, which would be an equally winning electoral strategy.

=== MHP connection ===
The Turkish Nationalist Movement Party's (MHP) president Mehmet Emin İlhan of Güçlükonak, Şırnak was interrogated due to a call that was made from the telephone line registered in the name of İlhan to the bombing attacker of Istiklal Avenue Ahlam Albashir. Ilhan was interrogated but not detained. He alleged that the PKK was to blame for it and that someone registered a telephone line in his name with a copy of his ID card.

=== Other events ===
Jiyan Tosun, a lawyer and member of the Human Rights Association, was accused by Adem Taskaya, a politician of the far-right Victory Party, of having planted the bomb by order of the PKK. Following this, she was threatened repeatedly and preferred to stay at a courthouse instead of returning home. In January 2023, an investigation for illegally obtaining and releasing personal data was initiated against Taskaya.

== Aftermath ==
Around an hour after the explosion took place, a broadcast ban was issued by the Istanbul Criminal Court for all visual and audio news and social networking sites related to the incident. Only interviews with government officials are allowed to be reported about. CNN Türk and TRT then stopped reporting on the incident. Internet speeds throughout Turkey and access to social media platforms such as Facebook, Twitter, Instagram and YouTube have been significantly decreased since the attack.

Istanbul's anti-terrorist office decided to suspend the rights of defense of suspects but also of Internet users who have shared "negative information" about the attack on social networks.

On 20 November 2022, Turkish Air Force launched a series of airstrikes against Kurdish separatist positions in Northern Syria and Iraq, dubbed Operation Claw-Sword. Despite dubious links, the Istanbul bombing and alleged link to YPG/PKK was used as justification for massive bombing of the Autonomous Administration of North and East Syria and its infrastructures. About 500 targets were hit in Syria and Iraq. Top SDF officials called for resuming peace talks, avoid a deadly conflict, and vowed resistance if attacked.

On 24 February 2023, Turkish authorities reported that intelligence services had conducted an operation in northern Syria, killing the alleged mastermind of the attack, reported to be PKK member Halil Menci.

On 26 April 2024, Alham Albashir was convicted by a Turkish court and sentenced to seven consecutive life sentences for her role in the bombing.

== Internal reactions ==
=== Government politicians ===
Health Minister Fahrettin Koca said the victims were being treated in the hospitals nearby. President Erdoğan released a statement, stating, "After the treacherous attack, our members of the police went to the scene, and our wounded were sent to the surrounding hospitals. Efforts to take over Turkey and the Turkish nation through terrorism will reach their goal neither today nor in the future, the same way they failed yesterday." Erdoğan also said: "The perpetrators would be punished."

The Minister of the Interior Süleyman Soylu argued that the attack was carried out by the PKK in retaliation for the Turkish invasion of northeastern Syria and criticized the United States for its support of the Kurdish People's Defense Units (YPG) in north-eastern Syria. He had previously blamed the United States for the attack in Mersin in September and had said that the US had funded the Syrian Kurdish Democratic Union Party (PYD) up to $2 billion since 2019.

=== Opposition ===
Ekrem İmamoğlu, the mayor of Istanbul, inspected the bombing site and called the population not to pay attention to misleading information on the incident. The leader of the Republican People's Party (CHP), Kemal Kılıçdaroğlu, said immediately after the attack, "We must unite against all forms of terrorism. We must raise a common voice against all forms of terrorism and we must condemn terrorism. No matter where the terror comes from, whatever its source, 85 million people living in this country must be saying the same thing. They must curse terrorism, those who commit it and those who support it. When we do this, we will have a unity of heart, it will be better for us to embrace each other."

The chairwoman of the Good Party (İYİ) Meral Akşener condemned the attack, stating: "I strongly condemn this vile attack. We would like those responsible to be caught as soon as possible".

The Kurdish People's Democratic Party (HDP) expressed its "deep sorrow and grief over the explosion that has killed six of our fellow citizens and injured 81 others", adding that "Our grief and sorrow is great. We wish God's mercy to the citizens who lost their lives". The attack was also condemned by the imprisoned former chairman of the HDP Selahattin Demirtaş.

=== Civil reactions ===
The Turkish Football Federation (TFF) announced that the Süper Lig match at Vodafone Park between Beşiktaş J.K. and Antalyaspor was postponed due to the bombing. Several football clubs offered their condolences. A day after the incident the avenue was decorated with 1200 Turkish flags as a way of remembering the victims of the bombing, and most tree benches on the İstiklal were removed.

French writer Patrice Franceschi argues the attack is unlikely to be from Syrian Kurdish forces, who are pragmatically aware of Turkey's superior force and carefully avoid to provoke it and another Turkish operation in Syria. Franceschi argues there are both electoral and ideological motives on the part of AKP government to put the blame on autonomous, socialist, egalitarian AANES, since their social vision and existence is in opposition with autocratic, increasingly Islamist and expansionist nationalism of the AKP government.

== International reactions ==
Countries thanked by Turkish President that expressed their condolences and expressions of support

Representatives of many governments condemned the attack and offered their condolences. Condolences were also offered by international organizations such as the European Council, North Atlantic Treaty Organization (NATO), and Organization of Turkic States (OTS).

German President Frank-Walter Steinmeier expressed his condolences to Recep Tayyip Erdoğan the president of Turkey. Steinmeier said, "In this moment of shock, we Germans stand by the citizens of Istanbul and the Turkish people." Steinmeier wrote Sunday, in step with an assertion from his office."

German Foreign Minister Annalena Baerbock also said: "My thoughts are with the people who simply wanted to stroll on the Istiklal shopping street on a Sunday and have now become victims of a serious explosion." Baerbock also said, "Our thoughts are with those who were injured, and our deepest condolences go to those who lost loved ones."

French President Emmanuel Macron expressed his condolences on Twitter. Macron said, "On this meaningful day for our nation, just as we commemorate those who lost their lives on November 13, 2015, the Turkish people were attacked from their heart, from Istanbul," Macron said, referring to November 2015 Paris attacks on the Bataclan theatre and other parts of Paris claimed by the so-called "Islamic State" militant group seven years ago. "We share your pain. Our condolences. We are with you in the fight against terrorism," Macron said.

The condolences offered by the U.S. embassy in Turkey were rejected by the Turkish Interior Minister Süleyman Soylu, who repeated the claim that the attack was carried out by the US-supported YPG.

The Left in the European Parliament – GUE/NGL argued AKP accusations linking the attack to Syrian YPG is an electoral strategy, using war mongering to distract from deepening economic context and to raise nationalist votes.

== See also ==
- Neve Shalom Synagogue massacre
- 2001 Istanbul suicide bombing
- 2003 Istanbul bombings
