= 2009 Istanbul bus attack =

Terrorist incident in Turkey

- Location: Küçükçekmece, Istanbul
- Date: 8 November 2009

In November 2009, Molotov cocktails were thrown at a bus and set ablaze in Istanbul. 17-year old Serap Eser was badly burnt and died in the hospital, after a while in coma. The Kurdistan Workers’ Party (PKK) was blamed and still to this day some Turkish officials and pro-Turkey media outlets accuse them. In 2015, former Interior Minister İdris Naim Şahin later stated “I have unfortunately learned that the people who sabotaged the bus, throwing Molotov cocktails, were members of MİT”.

The newspaper Vatan reported that a suspect in the case stated, they were member of MİT (Turkey's intelligence agency, sometimes involved in clandestine events) and that the MIT also had responded to the court confirming this, saying the suspect known as "A.S." had been used as an intelligence operative in a number of incidents.

In 2012, the then Peoples’ Democratic Party (HDP) co-chair Selahattin Demirtaş stated that the MIT was responsible for the killing and also responsible of other acts. The Main opposition Republican People’s Party (CHP) also raised questions about the incident in 2015 at the Turkish parliament. In the same year members of the CHP Youth Organization marched in front of the Galatasaray High School, chanting slogans and showing signs reading "The murderer state will be accountable", "The Molotov MIT Official Who Killed Serap Eser 241 Children were Murdered under AKP rule. We will ask for an account.", Sezgin Tanrıkulu, Deputy Chairman and Gürsel Tekin General Secretary of the CHP were supportive.

== The attack ==
On November 8, 2009, Molotov cocktails were thrown at a bus, which was set ablaze. A 17-year-old teenager, Serap Eser, was onboard among others on her way home; she was badly burnt, dying a month later in hospital while in a coma.

== Aftermath ==
Four who were under the age of 18 when the attack occurred were sentenced for being a member of a terrorist organization and intentional homicide. After Interior Minister İdris Naim Şahin statements, four of those who were accused of carrying out the attack filed a complaint to the Bakırköy Public Prosecutor’s Office on 23 January 2015.

In 2014, Alevi Bektashi Federation chairman Selahattin Özel stated regarding the incident “The PM and his spokespeople are continuously trying to correlate Alevis with terror groups. They are holding Alevis together with terror organizations. Previous to this incident, a girl of ours died in a molotov cocktail [attack] which was thrown at a bus. MİT came out behind this and [the AKP] let them go." A Turkish court dismissed all claims of involvement with the Turkish MİT involvement.

In 2011, a case in which two Kurds were sentenced to over 12 years in prison for being in possession of a Molotov cocktail, the court case referred back to this incident.

== See also ==
Terror attacks in Istanbul
