= 2008 Istanbul bombings =

2008 bombings with 17 fatalities, including 5 children

Coordinates: 41.012°N 28.976°E

- Location: Güngören, Istanbul, Turkey
- Date: July 27, 2008; 18:45 (UTC)
- Attack type: Bombings
- Deaths: 17
- Injuries: 154

The 2008 Istanbul bombings occurred on July 27, 2008 when two explosions hit a busy shopping street in the Güngören district of Istanbul, killing seventeen people, five of them children, and injuring 154. The attacks occurred at 9:45 p.m. local time, 18:45 UTC, on a pedestrian street closed to traffic. The bombings were the deadliest civilian attacks in Turkey since the 2003 Istanbul bombings, five years earlier.

== Details ==
The first of the two bombs was a sonic bomb which was placed in a telephone cabin and second bomb was placed in a waste container 50 meters away, near a crowded street. The first bomb caused crowds to gather for help and curiosity, and around 10 minutes later, the second and more powerful bomb exploded, causing many of the casualties. The police believe that the bombs were activated remotely. Political analyst Damla Aras said that, "there is a possibility they might be A4, C-4 explosives, which were brought from northern Iraq by the PKK and have been used several times in Turkey."

Early on, news sources thought the first explosion was caused by a gas leak.

The blasts were the deadliest to hit Istanbul since a series of bombings in November 2003 that killed over 60 people.

== Investigation ==
Nobody has claimed responsibility for the bombing as of yet, although Kurdish separatist militants are suspected. The Istanbul Police indicate that the incident bears the hallmarks of the Kurdistan Workers Party (PKK), possibly in revenge for a series of major operations by the Turkish military on its bases days prior to the incident. However a senior member of the PKK, Zubeyir Aydar, denied the implication: "The Kurdish liberation movement is not involved in this attack."

Based on a tip from residents, three teenagers were taken into custody in connection to the bombings.

Nine people were indicted in December 2008 over the bombings.

== See also ==
- 1999 Istanbul bombings
- 2003 Istanbul bombings
- 2022 Istanbul bombing
- List of terrorist incidents, 2008
