= Roar: Tigers of the Sundarbans =

- Promotional Poster
- Directed by: Kamal Sadanah
- Written by: Kamal Sadanah; Abis Rizvi
- Produced by: Abis Rizvi
- Starring: Abhinav Shukla; Himarsha Venkatsamy; Achint Kaur; Subrata Dutta; Nora Fatehi; Ali Quli Mirza; Aadil Chahal; Varinder Singh Ghuman; Aaran Chaudhary; Pranay Dixit; Pulkit Jawahar
- Cinematography: Michael Watson
- Edited by: Kamal Sadanah; Muzzammil Nasir
- Music by: John Stewart BGM
- Production company: AA Films
- Release date: 31 October 2014
- Running time: 123 minutes
- Country: India
- Language: Hindi

Roar is a 2014 Indian Hindi-language adventure thriller film written and directed by Kamal Sadanah. The film premiered at an event in Mumbai on 31 July 2014, ahead of its 31 October release. It follows the epic tale of a team trying to outsmart the acute senses of the infamous white tiger who is looking for her cub.

== Plot ==
After his photojournalist brother gets killed by a white tigress in the jungles of the Sundarbans, Pandit and his team of commandos enter the prohibited core area of the forest to avenge his death.

== Cast ==
- Abhinav Shukla as Pandit
- Himarsha Venkatsamy as Jhumpa
- Achint Kaur as Forest Warden
- Subrata Dutta as Bheera
- Nora Fatehi as CJ
- Ali Quli Mirza as Hero
- Aadil Chahal as Kashmiri
- Varinder Singh Ghuman as Cheena
- Aaran Chaudhary as Sufi
- Pranay Dixit as Madhu
- Pulkit Jawahar as Uday

== Production ==
Roar was shot in the dense mangrove forest in the Sundarbans National Park, showcasing the animal-man conflict, and the film has aerial visuals of the Sundarbans and over 800 shots with special effects.

Director Kamal Sadanah said, "We spent four months doing the test shoots and we shot with trained tigers from Los Angeles and Thailand and composited these sequences with the ones taken at Sundarbans with VFX". He concluded by saying that he had to take up an online course in visual effects along with his producer Abis Rizvi.

== Crew ==
LA-based Michael Watson, whose resume has The Curious Case of Benjamin Button, was hired as the director of photography, and a special team from Scandinavia was signed to film the aerial shots using helicams. Producer Rizvi said, "With an international crew of 150 on board and a 300-member VFX team, it took us 12 months to edit the film and put our audacious dream out on celluloid. Academy Award winner Resul Pookutty was signed for sound design."

== Reviews ==
Roar gathered mixed reviews. Hindustan Times mentioned it as a novel concept which makes an interesting film and appreciated its editing and computer graphics and said the film "would show you something that you didn't even know existed in India", concluding it as a smartly executed film which deserves attention.

Subhash K Jha for NDTV wrote that, "Roar is a visual swagger and splendour with stunning shots of the natural beauty of the Sunderbans, if you're the sort who grants leeway to movies for stretching its neck out beyond the domain of the conventional." He observed its photography to be 'brilliant'.

Rediff gave 2 1/2 stars and mentioned "Roar would not disappoint you and the film's strengths are the novelty of the concept, and the judicious use of computer graphics". Filmfare mentioned it as "entertaining, shot like a Hollywood film, which has some genuinely great computer graphics". It also wrote that the camera work is at par with any big-budget Hollywood film, and the cinematography showcases the flora and fauna of the Sundarbans on a grand scale, and the special effects are superlative.

Movie Talkies gave it 3 stars, saying "technical brilliance and the film's stage & setting – This is what makes Roar stand out from the crowd in a major way".

== Box office ==
As per Box Office India, Roar collected 15 million on its first day of release, and a total of 4.75–5.0 million net as weekend collection.

While Movie Glamour reported that Roar was doing moderate business and collected 70.0 million from its first 4 days, Bollywood Hungama reported that Roar collected 83.8 million at the end of its 1st week run.

== See also ==
- Tiger attacks
- Tiger attacks in the Sundarbans
- Champawat Tiger
- Thak man-eater
