= 2004 Acıbadem bombing =

Car bombing in Acıbadem, Turkey

- Part of Terrorism in Turkey & Maoist insurgency in Turkey
- Location: 41.003251°N 29.04382°E; Acıbadem, Kadıköy, Istanbul
- Date: 20 May 2004; 18:15 (UTC+02:00)
- Attack type: Car bombing
- Deaths: 0
- Injuries: 0
- Perpetrator: TİKKO
- No. of participants: at least 1

On 20 May 2004, a car bomb detonated in Acıbadem, Turkey, in the car park of a shopping center. No casualties were reported and numerous parked cars were seriously damaged by the explosion. The police, who were informed about a bomb 15 minutes before the attack, evacuated the shopping center and took intense security measures, preventing the loss of life.

Eight people with connections to the attack were arrested in the week after the attack. After judicial process, it was revealed that they were TİKKO members. It was determined that the individuals were involved in the bombing, as well as an incident that resulted in the killing of 2 soldiers in Tokat.
