= Istanbul Justice Palace siege =

2015 hostage crisis in Istanbul, Turkey

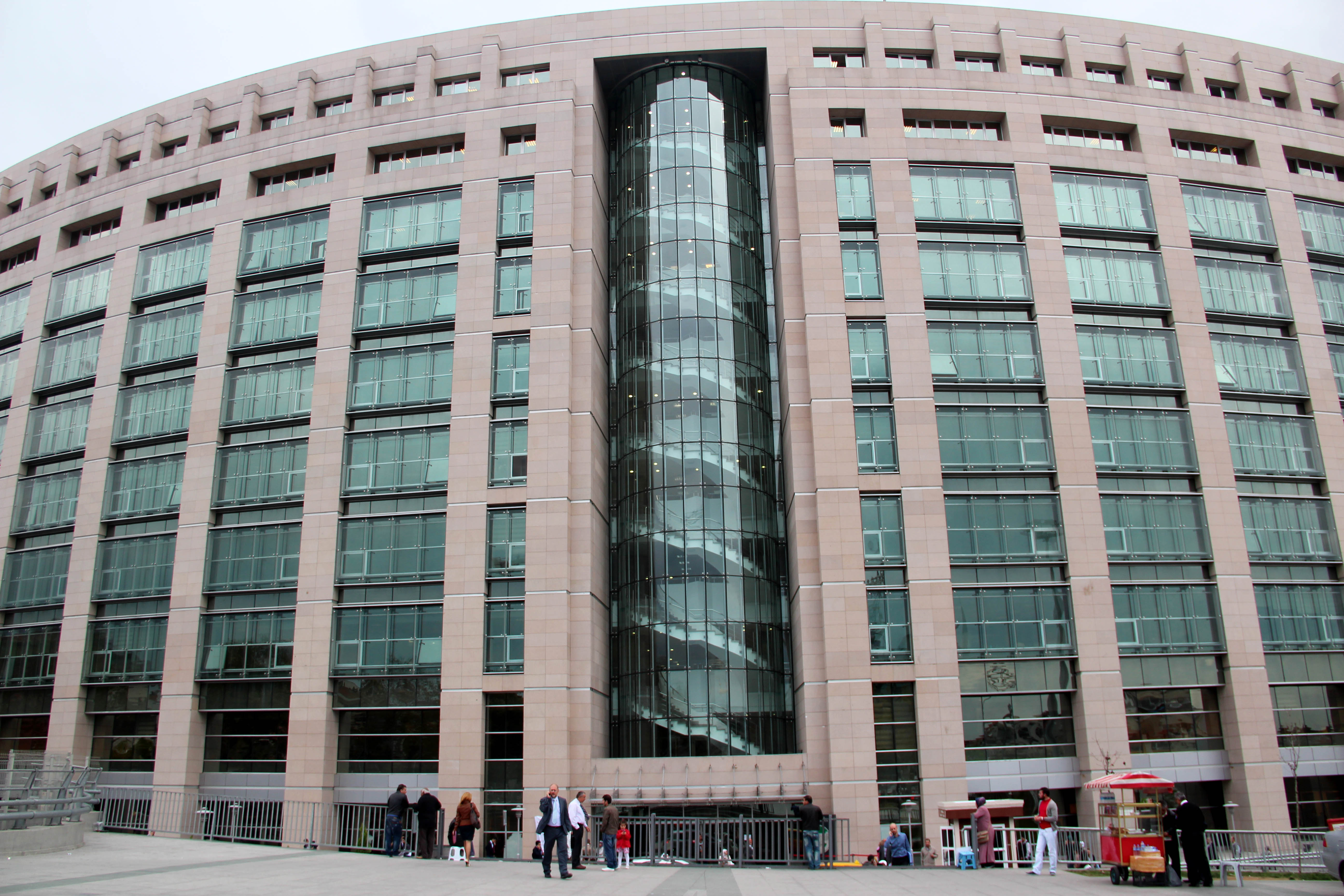
- Istanbul Justice Palace
- Location: Şişli, Istanbul
- Date: 31 March 2015; 12:30 pm - 9:00 pm
- Attack type: Hostage taking
- Weapon: 7,65 mm firearms
- Deaths: 3 (including 2 assailants)
- Perpetrator: Revolutionary People's Liberation Party/Front
- Assailants: Şafak Yayla; Bahtiyar Doğruyol

On 31 March 2015, a hostage crisis occurred in the Şişli district of Istanbul, Turkey, at the Istanbul Justice Palace. The public prosecutor Mehmet Selim Kiraz, who conducted the investigation of the Berkin Elvan case, was taken hostage by the members of the Revolutionary People's Liberation Party/Front (DHKP-C). After the incident, the building was evacuated and security measures were taken by the police. Members of the organization gave a list of requests to the police while threatening to kill the prosecutor. In the incident that lasted about nine hours, Prosecutor Kiraz was killed by DHKP-C militants. The two attackers were also killed.

== Background ==
Berkin Elvan was seriously injured when hit on the head by a tear-gas canister fired by a police officer on the morning of 16 June 2013 during the Gezi Park protests. He remained in a coma until 11 March 2014 when he died. Several protests began in Turkey. The public's sensitivity towards the Berkin Elvan case increased. Although two and a half years passed from the incident, no result was achieved in the Berkin Elvan case. On 7 March, during a commemoration ceremony for Berkin, his father Sami Elvan said, "We still don't see Berkin's murderers around. Still Berkin's murderers continue their lives. But our child is not here. I want everyone to be following this case."

Kiraz, the prosecutor appointed in September 2014, was the 5th prosecutor appointed to the investigation. The forensic report was included in the case file during Kiraz's term. It was written in the report that Berkin Elvan was injured as a result of a hard object hitting his head and died while he was being treated at the hospital. In another report sent by the National Criminal Bureau, it was stated that there could be 3 suspect police officers based on the result of the photo examinations. The prosecutor asked for the information of the police officers working at the scene for the purpose of identification. The 3 suspects could not be identified, even after sending the IDs and photographs of the 21 police officers by the security forces. When the suspects could not be fully identified, the prosecutor sent the images to the Gendarmerie Criminelle. Kiraz had also been dealing with some other Gezi Park protest cases since October 2014.

=== Perpetrators ===
- Şafak Yayla (born 8 May 1991 in Zonguldak): Yayla, who came to the Akyazı district of Sakarya by passing high school entrance exams, studied at Akyazı Anatolian High School for 4 years. Yayla studied for a year in a private school in Akyazı in the last year of high school and finished first in his class, winning a seat in the Istanbul University School of Law. Yayla, who was detained while protesting the participation of the Prime Minister Recep Tayyip Erdoğan at the opening of the academic year in Istanbul University in 2011, stated that he was tortured in custody. He was arrested in 2013 with the claim that he was carrying a bomb. He had met the other suspect Bahtiyar Doğruyol while serving his sentence in the Tekirdağ F-type prison. He was released in December 2014.
- Bahtiyar Doğruyol

=== The prosecutor taken hostage ===
Mehmet Selim Kiraz, who was born in Siirt in 1969, studied at Mersin İmam Hatip School and completed his higher education in Istanbul University School of Law. Kiraz was appointed to Gaziosmanpaşa Public Prosecutor's Office from Osmaniye in 2010 with the Decree of the High Council of Judges and Prosecutors (HSYK). After working there for 4 years, Kiraz was appointed as the Istanbul Public Prosecutor with the decree of the High Council of Judges and Prosecutors dated 11 June 2014. As part of the division of labor organized by the Chief Public Prosecutor of Istanbul, he was given charge of the Office of Investigations. His wife was also a judge at the Istanbul Justice Palace, with whom he had two children.

== Hostage-taking ==
The location of the place in Istanbul where the incident took place.

DHKP-C militants Şafak Yayla and Bahtiyar Doğruyol came to the Istanbul Justice Palace with their lawyer robes and fake lawyer IDs and went inside without getting searched. The two militants entered the prosecutor's room and disabled the prosecutor who pressed the panic button. They locked the room from the inside. Security guards could not get into the locked room. The attackers who took the prosecutor hostage at 12:30 announced this at 12:36 via social media. Police teams, who came to the scene, began to negotiate with the attackers. There was a blockage in the talks when the militants asked for the police officers responsible for the murder of Berkin Elvan to be brought there.

Temporary broadcasting ban was ordered by the Prime Minister's office around 4:00 pm on the grounds of enforcing national security and public order.

The Special Operation Teams started an operation around 8:30 pm. After the operation organized by the Special Operation Teams, the two DHKP-C militants died and the prosecutor was seriously injured. According to another claim, the prosecutor had died by the time the operation ended.

== Later events ==
Mehmet Selim Kiraz was taken to Florence Nightingale Hospital. The bullets had hit his head from 3 angles. When he was brought in, he had a heart attack and stopped breathing. Despite an hour of intervention, he could not be saved. According to the forensic report of Florence Nightingale Hospital, a total of 10 bullet wounds, 3 of which were in the head, 6 in the chest and 1 in the leg region, were detected.

The necessity to reconsider the security measures implemented by the government in courthouses was discussed following this incident.

On 2 April 2015, the General Directorate of Security announced that the bullets that killed Mehmet Selim Kiraz came out of the gun used by the militants not the police.

According to the judicial report on 3 April 2015, it was announced that the prosecutor was the target of not 5 but 10 bullets from the front and back. As explained earlier in the report, no statements about a possible 'adjacent shot' was provided.

=== Judicial process ===
It was reported in the press that Erdal Ünal, nicknamed Zeki, was caught in Italy about 1 week after the incident, as it was determined that had given orders for the prosecutor's death from abroad as an instigator.

The preliminary autopsy report for Prosecutor Kiraz was published in the press on April 16, 2015. The cause of death in the report is specified as "Internal bleeding due to brain hemorrhage, brain tissue damage, and visceral injury with a skull, rib and scapula bone (scapula) fracture caused by firearm bullets." In addition, it was found out that two bullets of 7.65 mm diameter were removed from Kiraz's body.

=== Medical reports ===
Information was given about the process that started within the first minutes of the operation and ended with the prosecutor's arrival in the hospital. President Recep Tayyip Erdoğan stated that 5 bullets hit the Prosecutor and that he was hospitalized with serious injuries, while a spokesman for the police stated that these bullets belonged to the attackers. According to the report of Florence Nightingale Hospital, it was stated in the forensic report that 10 bullets hit the prosecutor. 3 of these bullets hit the head, 6 the chest and 1 the leg. They added to the report that 1 bullet was detected on the front side of the right shoulder and 2 on the backside of the right shoulder. As a result of this report, it was determined that the prosecutor was hit from both the front and back directions.

=== Reactions ===
The chairman of the Nationalist Movement Party Devlet Bahçeli reacted to the news by saying "Those who organize insulting sessions to Berkin Elvan and inflame polarization should pay the price of innocent lives that disappear."

Leader of the Republican People's Party Kemal Kılıçdaroğlu also reacted to the incident and said "I would like to ask the government and the intelligence about the prosecutor being taken hostage in front of their eyes; How was it possible to enter the courthouse with tools such as flag, streamer, gun, and plastic clamp? Was a power cut experienced during the introduction of these materials to the courthouse? Or is electricity deliberately cut for this purpose? If the courthouse's existing generator is in operation, who has helped to get these materials in? Does the government's statement of "Terrorist attack" after the interruption indicate that it had a finger in the hostage-taking incident? Do you have a job description to ensure the country's security and integrity? If a country's National Intelligence Service is dealing with things out of the scope of its job, then everyone can easily enter the office of a prosecutor."

Journalist Mirgün Cabas said on Twitter, "No matter how this situation ends, there is only one lesson to be learned: do not shoot the children, do not catcall at their mothers." However, the next day, he apologized following a wave of reactions.

People reacted to Şafak Yayla's body being taken to his home in Giresun. Esat Berberoğlu, uncle of the attacker, commented on these reactions and said, "He was a child studying in the law school. What are the reasons for these children to become like this? These children are also our precious. Aren't we human? They will describe him as a terrorist. Curse be upon the real terrorists in this country. Terrorists are those who rob this country. Those who cannot call the murderers of 30 thousand people terrorists call the child studying in the law school a terrorist. I declare here Şafak Yayla is not a terrorist."
