= June 2016 Istanbul bombing =

Terrorist incident in Turkey

- Part of the Kurdish–Turkish conflict (2015–present)
- Location: 41.01334°N 28.95671°E; Fatih, Istanbul, Turkey
- Date: 7 June 2016; 08:40 (UTC+3)
- Attack type: Suicide bombing
- Deaths: 13 (6 police officers 6 civilians, 1 perpetrator)
- Injuries: 51
- Perpetrator: Kurdistan Freedom Hawks
- Motive: Anti-Turkish

On 7 June 2016, at around 08:40 (UTC+3), a bombing occurred in central Istanbul, Turkey, killing 12 people and injuring 51 others, three of them seriously. The attack targeted a bus carrying policemen as the vehicle passed through the Vezneciler district near the Şehzade Mosque and the Vezneciler Metro station.

== Background ==
Istanbul had already been hit by two deadly bombings in January and March 2016, both of which had been claimed by the Islamic State of Iraq and the Levant (ISIL). Turkey was on high alert due to repeated bombings; two other attacks in Ankara in February and March that killed dozens were claimed by the Kurdistan Freedom Hawks (TAK), described as a "a radical offshoot of the outlawed Kurdistan Workers' Party (PKK)".

== Bombing ==
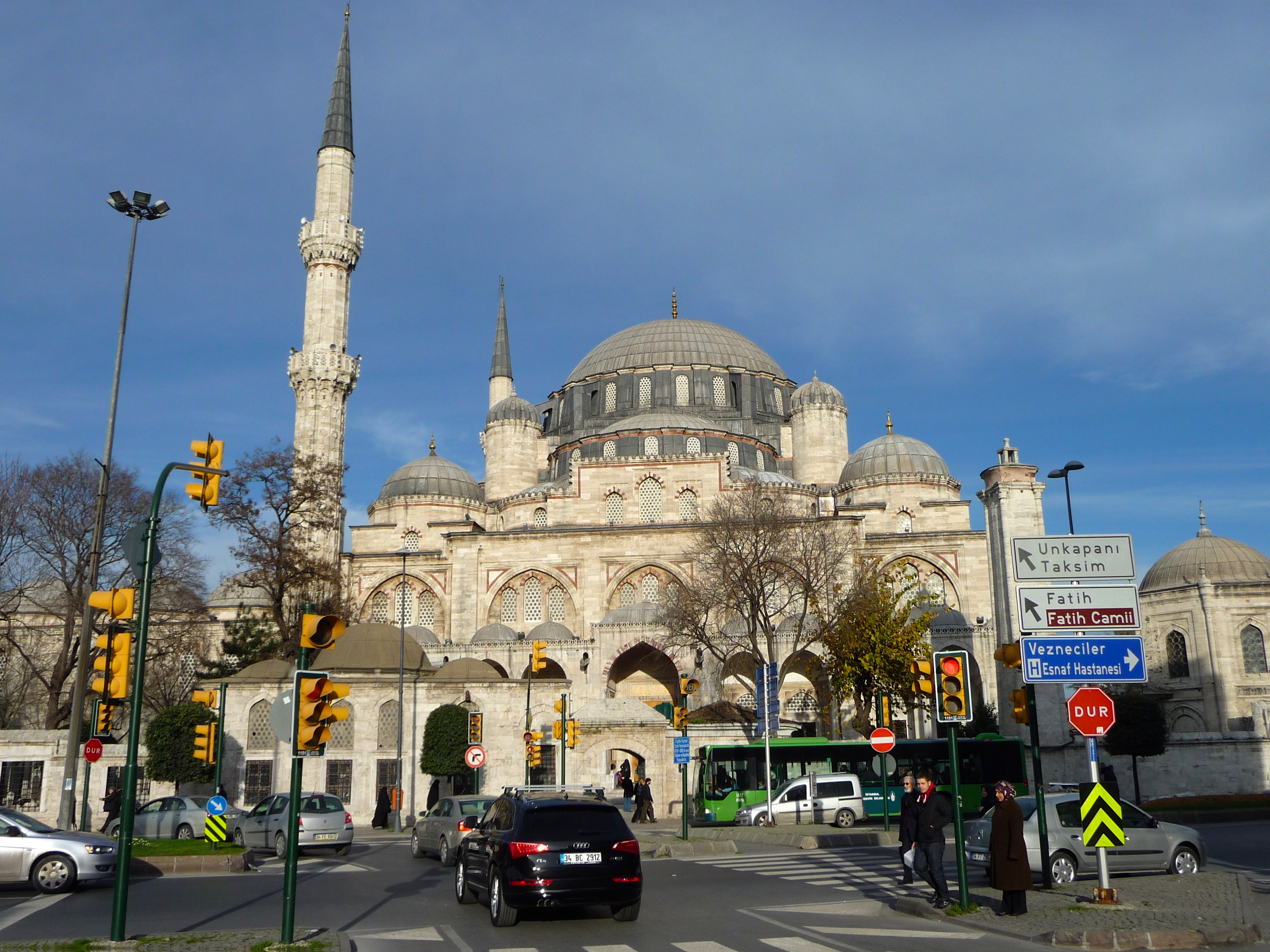
The Şehzade Mosque is very close to the site of the bombing and its windows were shattered by the force of the blast.

The attack targeted Çevik Kuvvet police forces that were changing guard in front of the Faculty of Sciences and Literature of Istanbul University. The attack occurred on the Şehzadebaşı Avenue, in front of a hotel between the Vezneciler bus station and a police station. The site was also close to the Beyazıt Square, a major tourist attraction. The bombing occurred at the morning rush hour. The bomb was reportedly remotely detonated. An eyewitness reported that a car exploded, but whether the bomb-laden car was moving or was parked at the time of the explosion was reportedly under investigation.

The force of the bombing overturned the police bus, damaged other nearby vehicles and heavily damaged the entrance of the hotel. A dorm that was close by to the site of the explosion was damaged by the bombing, with the fragments of the bomb shattering the windows and entering the students' rooms. Damage and shattered windows were reported over a wide area, including at the 16th-century Şehzade Mosque.

=== Perpetrator ===
No organization immediately claimed responsibility for the bombing. Initial assessments by Mete Yarar, a security analyst, stated that three organizations active in Turkey, the Kurdistan Workers' Party (PKK), ISIL or Revolutionary People's Liberation Party/Front (DHKP-C) could all be responsible for the blast. Cevat Öneş, former Assistant Undersecretary of the National Intelligence Organization, stated that there was a high probability that the PKK was responsible for the attack, though the chances of the perpetrator being ISIL should not be disregarded.

On 10 June, the Kurdistan Freedom Hawks (TAK) claimed responsibility for the attack, claiming that Turkey was no longer safe for foreign tourists to visit. The assailant was announced by TAK as Eylem Yaşa, codenamed "Eylem Nawroz", who had joined TAK in 2011 and was 32 years old at the time of the bombing. She was from Diyarbakır but had spent most of her life in Antalya and was part of the "Brigade of the Immortal" of TAK.

== Reactions ==
Following the bombing, Turkish President Recep Tayyip Erdoğan went to the Haseki hospital, where the injured people were being treated. There, he said that the distinction the terrorist organizations made between civilians, soldiers or police were of no interest to the state, and that it was in the end humans that were killed. Turkish Prime Minister Binali Yıldırım released a statement. Turkish Foreign Minister Mevlüt Çavuşoğlu condemned the attack and drew attention to the fact that it took place on the second day of Ramadan.

Selahattin Demirtaş, co-leader of the pro-Kurdish Peoples' Democratic Party, called for all party leaders to have a summit to find a solution to the bloodshed and to resign if they failed.

The Indian Ministry of External Affairs issued a statement condemning the bombing, and expressing solidarity with the Government and the people of Turkey. The statement also offered condolences to the victims' families and wished the injured a quick recovery. John R. Bass, ambassador of the United States to Turkey, and the European Union also issued statements of solidarity with Turkey.

== Aftermath ==
Following the bombing, the avenue was closed to traffic, and the Vezneciler metro station was closed. The public was evacuated from the area. After the evacuation of the area, security forces conducted a controlled explosion, which was heard by bystanders. Eyewitnesses also heard gunfire after the explosion, which was due to police officers firing in the air to restore order. Around 4 hours after the bombing, a ban on broadcasts of the bombing was put in place. All exams at Istanbul University were cancelled.

President Erdoğan's spokesman Ibrahim Kalin has stated that "all indicators and signs regarding the attack" indicate that the Kurdistan Workers' Party or another Kurdish separatist group carried out the bombing.

== See also ==
- June 2016 Midyat car bombing
