= Istanbul nightclub shooting =

2017 nightclub shooting in Ortaköy, Istanbul, Turkey

- Part of the Turkey–ISIL conflict
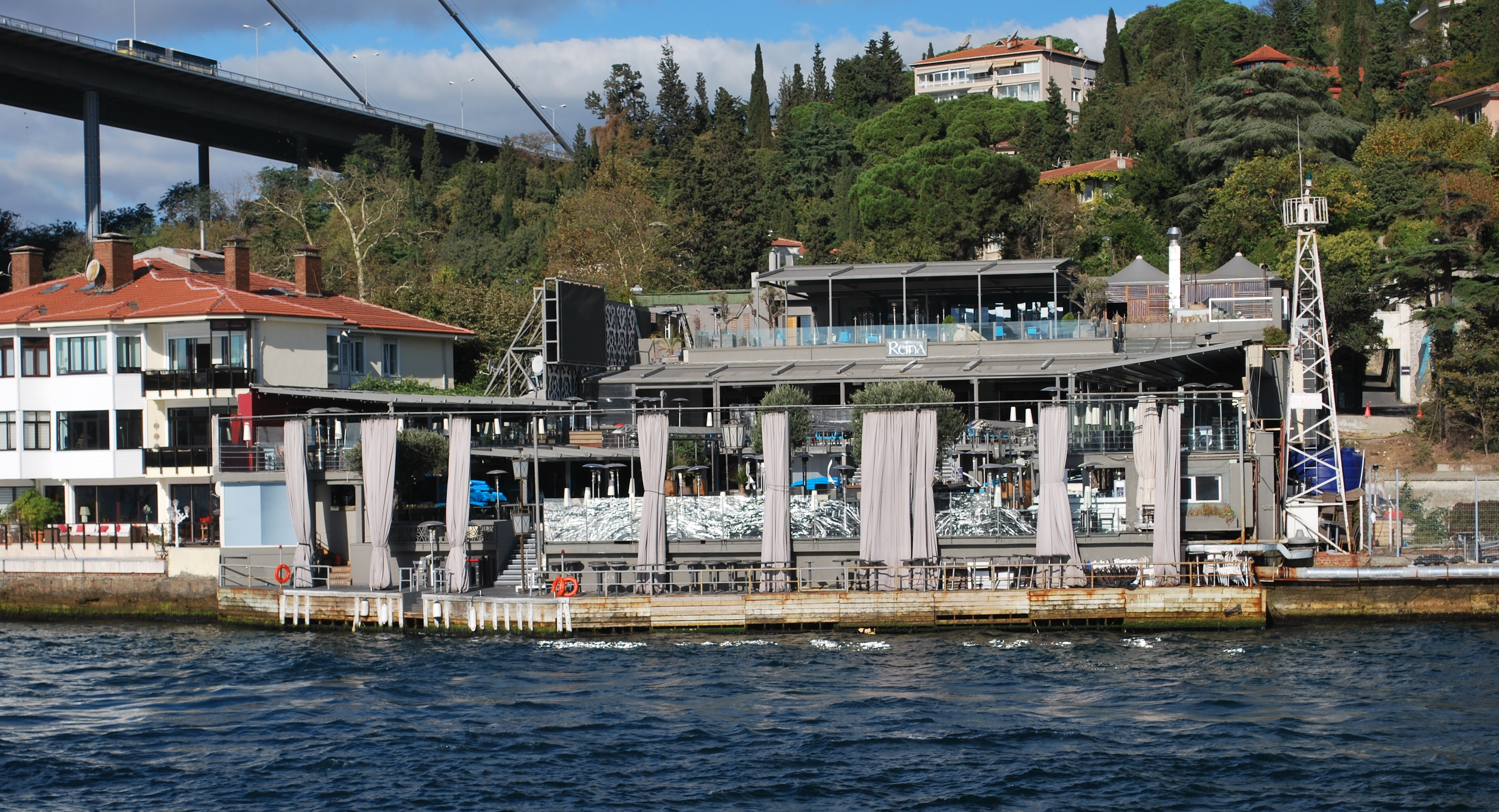
- The Reina nightclub in Istanbul in 2012

- Reina nightclub (Istanbul) Reina nightclub (Turkey)
- Location: 41°03′00″N 29°01′57″E; Istanbul, Turkey
- Date: 1 January 2017; 9 years ago 01:18 (FET)
- Target: Patrons at Reina nightclub
- Attack type: Mass shooting, mass murder
- Weapon: AKM semi-automatic rifle
- Deaths: 39
- Injuries: 80 (including the perpetrator)
- Perpetrator: Islamic State
- Assailant: Abdulkadir Masharipov
- Motive: Revenge for Turkish military involvement in Syria

The Istanbul nightclub shooting (also known as Reina massacre in Turkey) was a mass shooting that occurred on 1 January 2017 around 01:18 local time, in which a terrorist shot and killed 39 people and wounded 79 others at the Reina nightclub in the Ortaköy neighborhood of Istanbul, Turkey, where hundreds had been celebrating New Year's Day. Uzbekistan-born Abdulkadir Masharipov was arrested in Istanbul on 17 January 2017. Islamic State claimed credit for his actions. The first hearing in the trial of Masharipov and 51 accused accomplices was held on 11 December 2017, and the next hearing was held on 26 March 2018.

== Background ==
From the 2016 northern summer, the Islamic State had been under pressure and had sustained significant territorial losses due to three parallel offensives: the Turkish-Free Syrian Army Western al-Bab offensive and Battle of al-Bab, the Syrian Democratic Forces' Northern Raqqa offensive, and the Battle of Mosul in Iraq. The Turkish military intervention in Syria was the first military confrontation between ISIL and the Turkish Army, raising tensions.

Before the nightclub attack, heightened security measures had been put in place in Istanbul, with 17,000 police officers on duty, following several attacks in the area, including the attack on the Istanbul Atatürk Airport on 28 June 2016 which killed 48 people, and a bombing at the Vodafone Arena on 10 December 2016 which killed 46.

== Attack ==
A terrorist opened fire in the nightclub at approximately 01:18. He reportedly carried an AKM rifle; after killing a police officer and a bystander at the entrance he entered the club shooting. The assailant reportedly spoke Arabic during the attack and shouted the Arabic phrase "Allāhu akbar". He reportedly fired more than 180 rounds during the seven-minute incident, using stun grenades to aid in reloading his weapon. After the assault, he went into the kitchen, changed his clothes, and escaped by blending in with the crowd.

At the time of the attack, about 600 people were at the nightclub to celebrate the New Year. 39 people were killed, including the police officer on duty at the club entrance, and at least 79 others were injured. The morgue later revealed that most of the fatal victims were shot at close range and/or shot directly in the head. A number of people jumped into the waters of the Bosphorus strait to escape the attack. In the aftermath, police set up a cordon around the nightclub.

== Aftermath ==
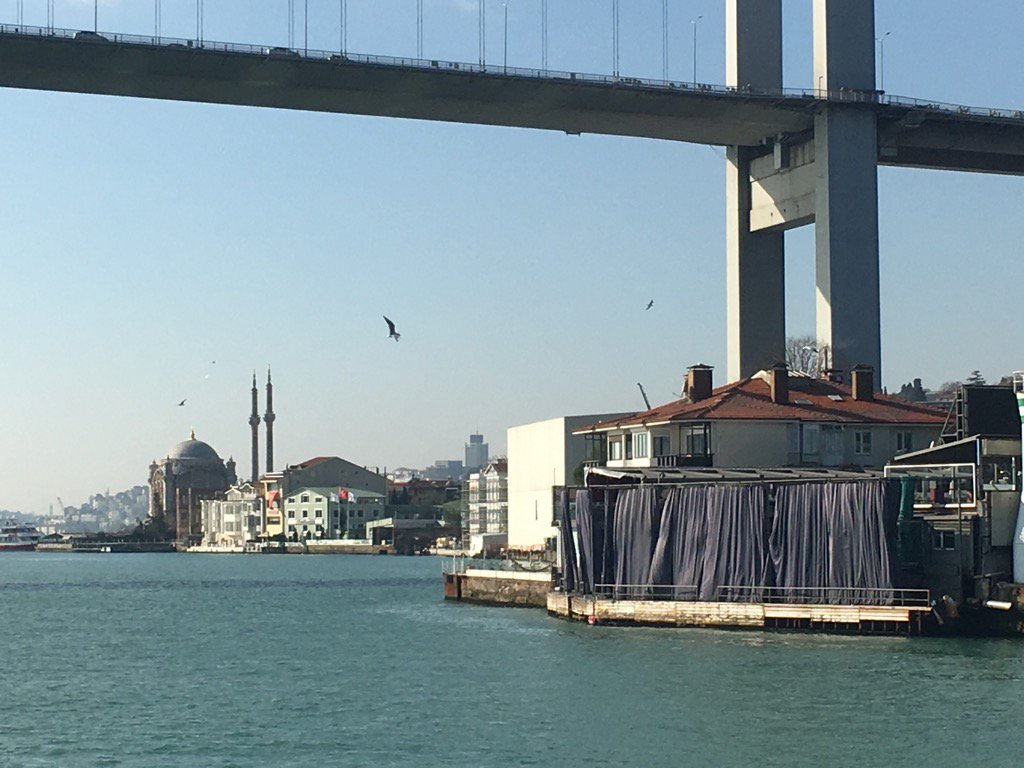
Reina nightclub screened off after the terrorist attack

Istanbul's governor Vasip Şahin said the incident was a terrorist attack. The Turkish government ordered a temporary media blackout, citing concerns over security and public order.

In response to the attack, the Turkish military carried out attacks against ISIL targets in the Syrian town of al-Bab. 22 people are claimed to have been killed in the raids.

Seven Uyghur restaurant workers were arrested by police in Zeytinburnu, which became the site of over 50 police sweeps against so-called "East Turkistanis" (Uyghurs), Kazakhs, Kyrgyz, and Uzbeks, a number of Uyghurs were detained outside of Istanbul in Selimpaşa, and altogether up to 36 people were detained in connection with the investigation in the days following the attack. It has been alleged that Kyrgyzstan passports were used by several families allegedly from East Turkestan (Xinjiang) with 20 children, and 22 women and men, all of whom were among 40 arrested by Turkish security forces in İzmir's Bornova and Buca districts. Weapons were found with the İzmir suspects. Syrians, Uyghurs, and Dagestanis were arrested in Izmir.

== Perpetrator ==
On 9 January 2017, Turkish police identified the suspected shooter as an Uzbek national, Abdulkadir Masharipov (Uzbek Cyrillic: Абдул-Кадир Машарипов; born 2 August 1988), who also goes by the name Abu Muhammed Horasani. He was arrested on 16 January at a Kyrgyz friend's apartment in the Esenyurt district of Istanbul. Firearms, ammunition, two drones and about $200,000 were found in the apartment.

Masharipov was 28 years old at the time of the attack and is believed to have been trained as a militant in Afghanistan and Pakistan before illegally entering Turkey through the Iranian border in January 2016. Masharipov is also believed to have trained with Al Qaeda in Iraq, the group that morphed into ISIL, and had spent most of his time in Turkey in the city of Konya before arriving in Istanbul on 16 December 2016. In an interview with police, Masharipov stated he was initially directed by ISIL to stage an attack at Taksim Square, but dropped the plan after conducting surveillance of the area and concluding there was too much security. Afterward, Masharipov passed the Reina and decided it would be a good target to attack due to a lack of security.

In September 2020, a Turkish court sentenced Masharipov to life imprisonment, plus an additional 1,368 years in prison, for killing 39 people and injuring 79 more. In his last testimony, he requested that he be exonerated, saying his original statements were under "torture and pressure". He said there was inadequate evidence against him. It is anticipated he will appeal the verdict.

On 10 December 2021, another suspect linked to the 2017 attack was detained in police custody in Bishkek, Kyrgyzstan.

== Victims ==
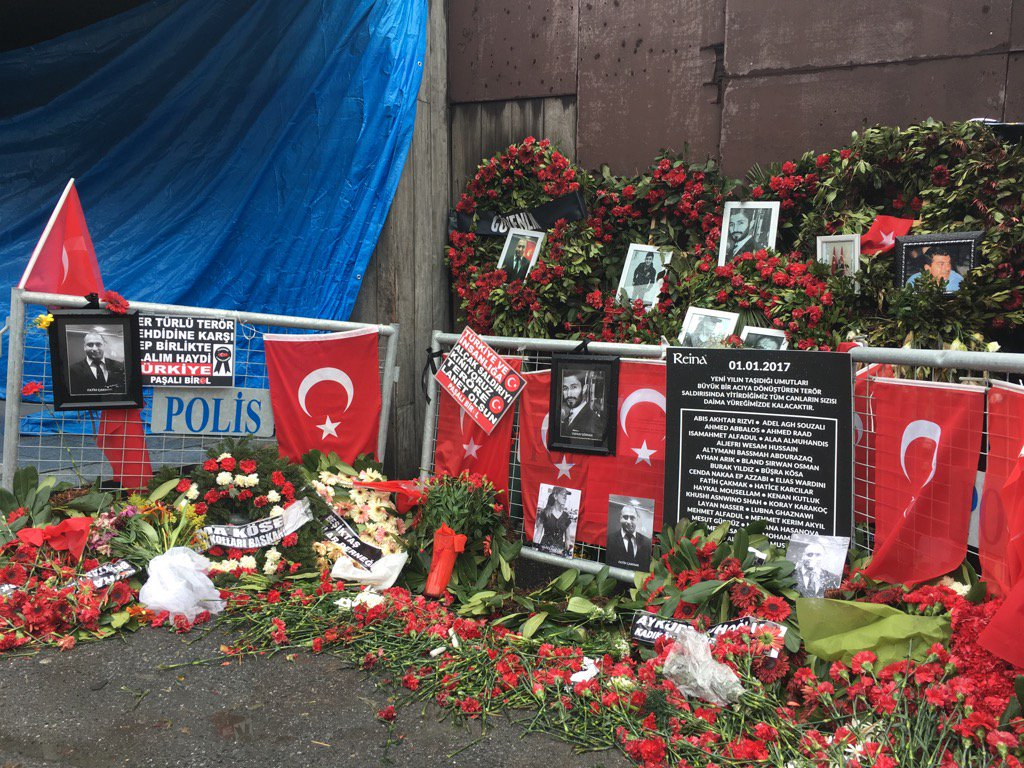
Tributes commemorating the victims outside Reina nightclub, January 17, 2017

Among the victims were people from 14 countries, including Bollywood film producer Abis Rizvi, producer of the 2014 film Roar: Tigers of the Sundarbans.

Victims by nationality
Nationality	Dead	Wounded	References
Turkey	10	Unknown	
Saudi Arabia	7	9	
Iraq	3	0	
Lebanon	3	7	
Jordan	2	4	
Morocco	2	4	
Turkey–Germany	2	0	
India	2	0	
Kuwait	1	5	
Libya	1	3	
Israel	1	1	
Tunisia	1	0	
Tunisia–France	1	0	
Canada	1	0	
Syria	1	0	
Russia	1	0	
France	0	4	
Germany	0	3	
Azerbaijan	0	2	
Bulgaria	0	1	
United States	0	1	
Unknown	0	35	
Total	39	79	

== Reactions ==
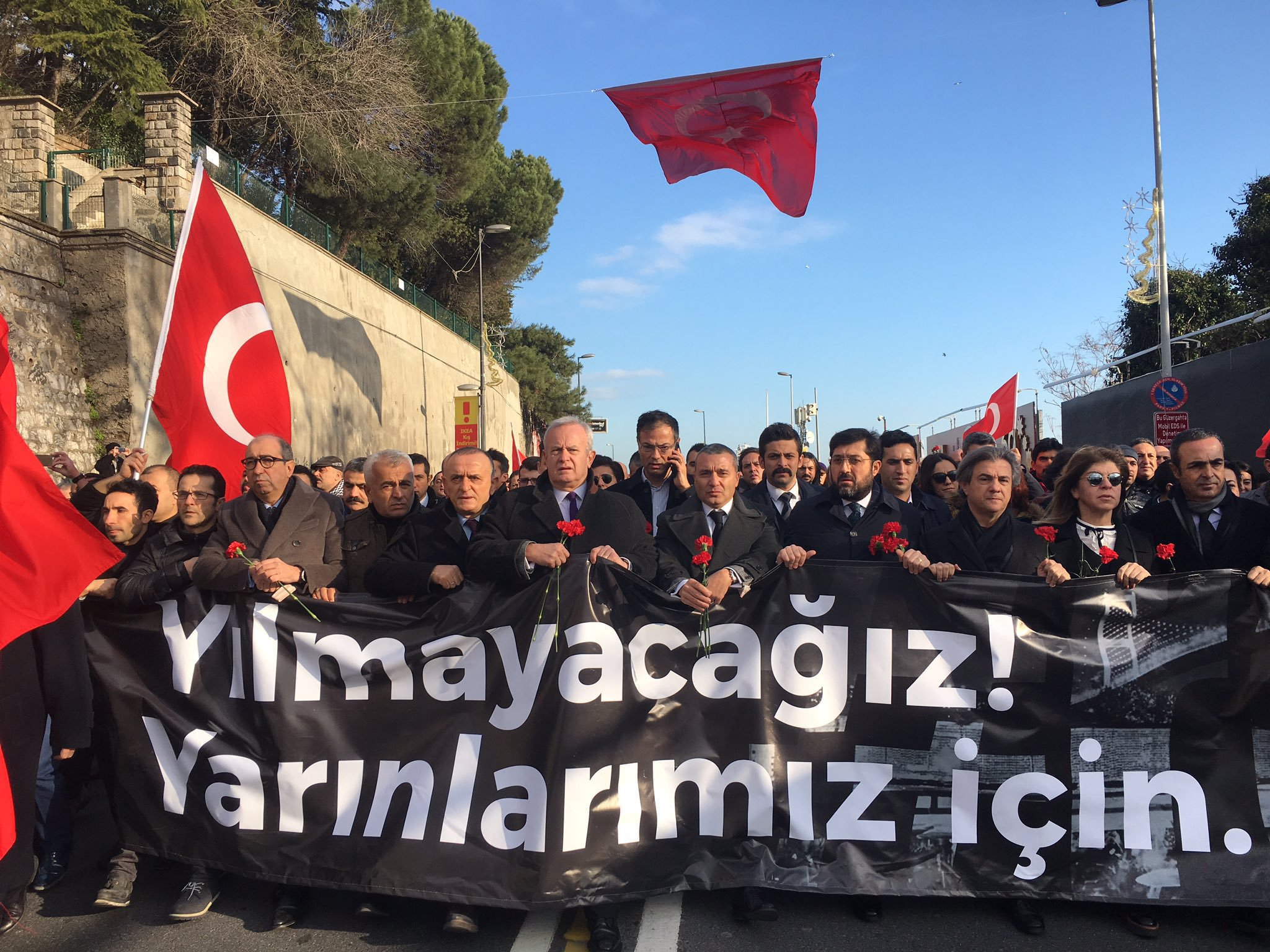
Mourners after the attack, January 3, 2017

Vasip Şahin, the governor of Istanbul, described the attack as a "violent and cruel act of terror" and said that the attacker had used a "long-range weapon" to "brutally and savagely" fire on people, referring to a type of assault rifle.

The President of Turkey Recep Tayyip Erdoğan condemned the attack and offered condolences on behalf of those who died, including victims from other countries.

Many world leaders and officials condemned the attack, offering condolences.

=== Conspiracy theories ===
The US embassy denied social media rumours that it had prior intelligence of the attack.

Some Turkish citizens, journalists, and pro-AKP journals such as Sabah put forward conspiracy theories claiming that agencies from Western countries, such as the CIA, organized the attack.

Doğu Türkistan Bülteni Haber Ajansı, which is the Turkish mouthpiece of the Uyghur group Turkistan Islamic Party (TIP), complained about the Reina massacre suspect being named as Uyghur by Veysi Kaynak, the Deputy Prime Minister, blaming Fethullah Gülen and his movement for the attack. Doğu Türkistan Bülteni Haber Ajansı, speaking on behalf of the TIP, pledged its animosity against Russia and the PKK, saying it fought them alongside Turkmen in Syria for six years, denying involvement in the Reina nightclub massacre and trying to blame China for the massacre, claiming that Uyghurs in Küçükçekmece and Zeytinburnu were being unfairly targeted. Doğu Türkistan Bülteni Haber Ajansı and Zeytinburnu Uyghurs blamed the Gülen movement for the Reina nightclub massacre.

== See also ==
- Orlando nightclub shooting
- 2015 Sousse attacks
- 2015 New Year's attack plots
- List of massacres in Turkey
- List of terrorist incidents in January 2017
- Terrorism in Europe
- List of rampage killers (religious, political, or ethnic crimes)
- Suruç bombing
- Terrorism in Turkey
- 2015 Diyarbakır rally bombings
- Turkey–ISIL conflict
- Spillover of the Syrian civil war
