= September 2001 Istanbul bombing =

Bombing in Istanbul, Turkey

2001 Istanbul suicide bombing
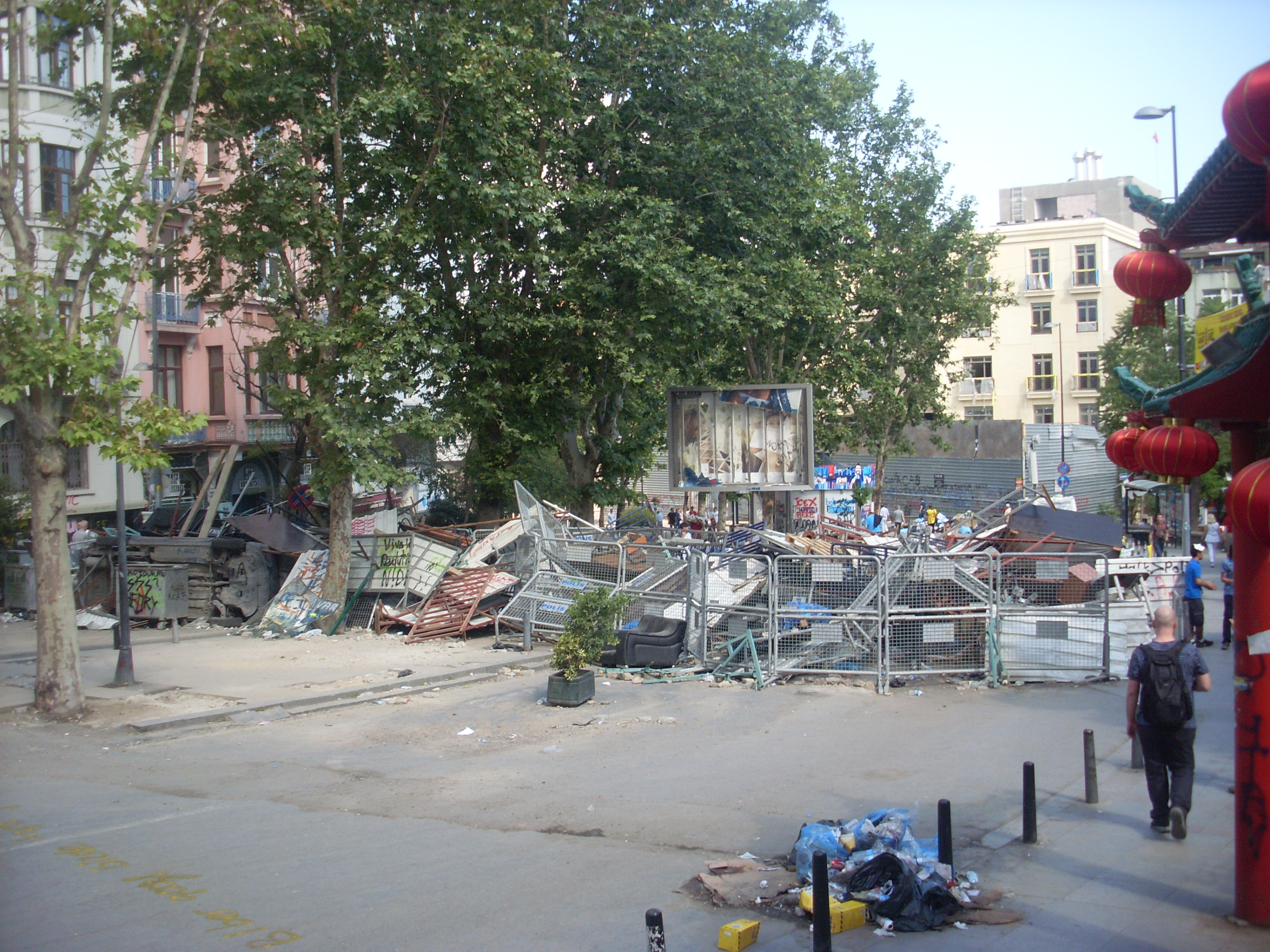
- A view from İnönü Street in 2013 where the attack happened. The explosion took place close to the Chinese Restaurant, which appears on the right.
- Location: Beyoğlu, Istanbul, Turkey
- Date: 10 September 2001; 5:30 pm EET (UTC+02:00)
- Attack type: Suicide attack
- Deaths: 4
- Injuries: 23
- Perpetrator: Revolutionary People's Liberation Party/Front
- Assailant: Uğur Bülbül

On 10 September 2001, a suicide attack was carried out by Revolutionary People's Liberation Party/Front member Uğur Bülbül in Beyoğlu, Istanbul, at a police checkpoint in the Gümüşsuyu neighborhood. As a result of the explosion, two police officers and one passerby civilian along with the attacker were killed and 23 others were injured. The bombing took place less than 24 hours before the September 11 attacks.

== Attack ==
At around 05:30 pm (UTC+02:00), Revolutionary People's Liberation Party/Front member Uğur Bülbül detonated explosive material at a police checkpoint between Vakıf Leasing-National Education Publications and the Chinese Restaurant buildings İnönü Street, which connects Gümüşsuyu to Taksim Square. While two police officers were killed in the blast, an Australian tourist passing by was seriously injured and died on 13 September. Due to the attack, 17 police officers and 6 other people were wounded.

== See also ==
- Terrorism in Turkey
