= Blue Market massacre =

1999 Terrorist attack in Istanbul

- Part of Kurdish–Turkish conflict (1978–present)
- Location: 40°58′55″N 29°04′03″E; Istanbul, Turkey
- Date: 13 March 1999; 27 years ago 16:25 (UTC+3)
- Target: Civilians
- Attack type: Arson Attack, Bombing, Kurdish Terror
- Deaths: 13
- Injuries: 5
- Perpetrator: Kurdistan Workers' Party (PKK)

The Blue Market massacre (Turkish: Mavi Çarşı Katliamı) refers to the terrorist attack of Kurdistan Workers' Party (PKK) on 13 March 1999 which resulted in the killing of 13 civilians.

== Attack ==
The attack happened on a busy Saturday afternoon in Blue Market (Turkish: Mavi Çarşı) a small sized local department store in Goztepe, located in the Asian side of Istanbul.

Three attackers wearing ski masks arrived the scene by car and entered the ground floor of the building pouring petroleum and throwing Molotov cocktails. The attackers fled on foot, pursued by police officers.

The blaze swept rapidly upwards and engulfed the five-storey building, shattering windows and driving shoppers up staircases in search of safety.

Despite the effort of the emergency services deployed to the scene, 13 people, mostly women and employees of the store, were killed and five injured.

== Aftermath ==
President Süleyman Demirel condemned the attack as "insidious" and the Prime Minister, Bülent Ecevit, said it was part of a campaign to disrupt national elections on 18 April 1999.

An angry crowd outside of the rumbles of building gathered and chanting "Death to the PKK", protesting the attack.

== Perpetrators ==
On 23 March 1999, Turkish Chief of the General Directorate of Security, Necati Bilican announced that four suspects, including the planner, have been apprehended in connection with the attack.

On 14 July 1999 the four defendants, one of whom is a woman, were brought to the court and admitted in their initial statements to having planned the incident. The public prosecutor asked for the death penalty for all of the defendants.

After a long trial process three suspects were sentenced to life imprisonment without parole and one into life imprisonment since Turkey abolished the death penalty in 2002.

== See also ==
- List of terrorist incidents in 1999
