= January 2001 Istanbul bombing =

Suicide Bombing

January 2001 Istanbul suicide bombing
- Location: Şişli, Istanbul, Turkey
- Date: 3 January 2001; 13:50 EET (UTC+02:00)
- Attack type: Suicide attack
- Deaths: 2 (including the perpetrator)
- Injuries: 7
- Perpetrator: Revolutionary People's Liberation Party/Front
- Assailant: Gültekin Koç

On 3 January 2001, a suicide attack was carried out by Revolutionary People's Liberation Party/Front member Gültekin Koç in Şişli, Istanbul, at a police station. As a result of the explosion, one civilian along with the perpetrator was killed and 7 others were injured, 2 being critically.

== Attack ==
At around 13:50 (UTC+02.00), Revolutionary People's Liberation Party/Front member Gültekin Koç introduced himself as a business man and entered a police station. He went to the room of Şişli District Chief Constable Selçuk Tanrıverdi using an elevator. Bodyguard of Tanrıverdi, Naci Canan Tuncer realized him and asked him why he wants to see Tanrıverdi. Koç panicked and detonated the explosives on him. Naci Canan Tuncer and perpetrator Gültekin Koç died in the attack while seven people including three police officers and 4 civilians were injured.
