= March 2016 Istanbul bombing =

Terrorist attack in Istanbul, Turkey

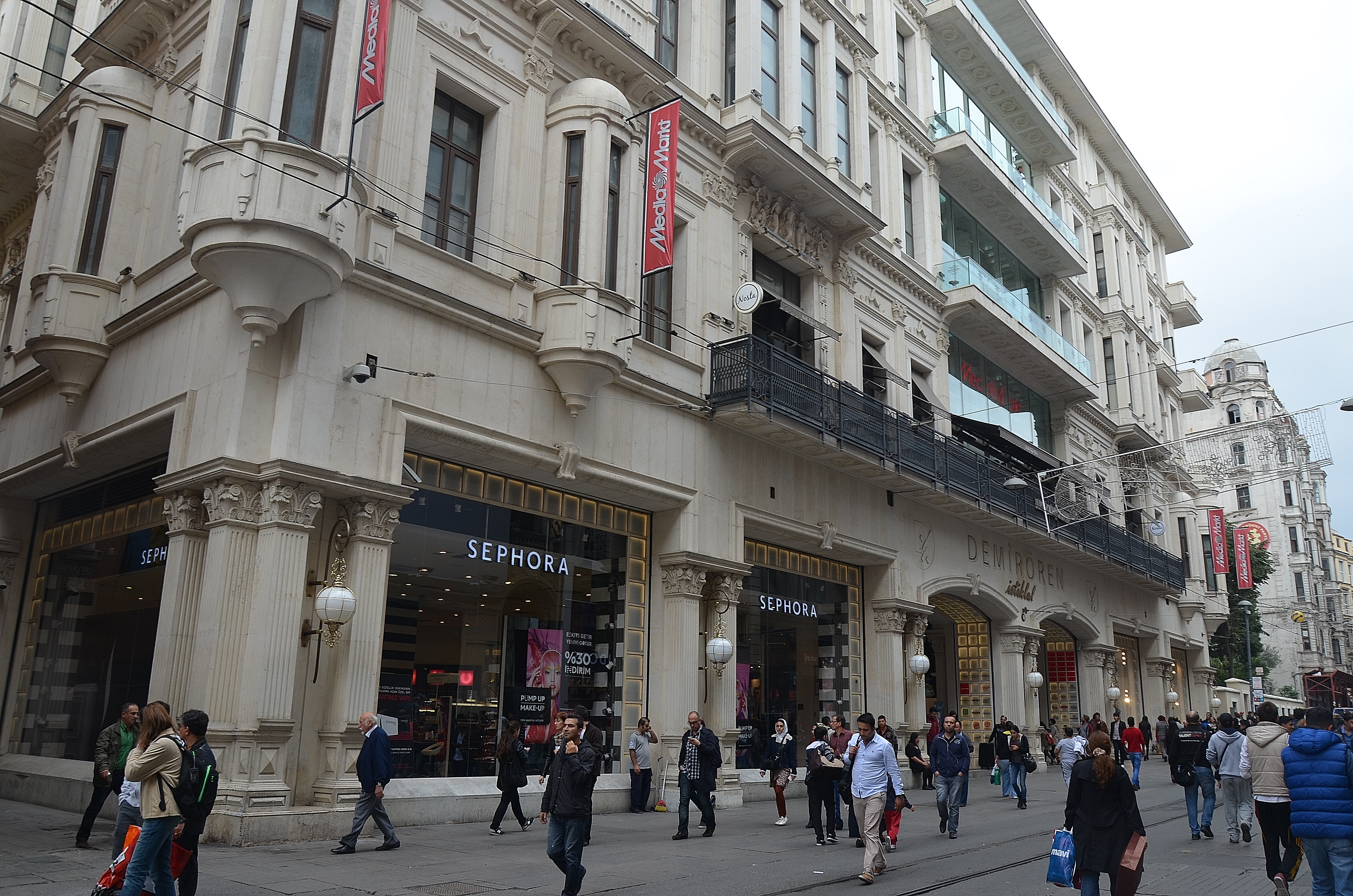
- Demirören AVM on İstiklal Avenue, near which the bombing took place.
- Location: 41°2′6″N 28°58′52″E; İstiklal Avenue, Taksim, Istanbul, Turkey
- Date: 19 March 2016; ~10:55 a.m. (UTC+2)
- Target: Civilians
- Attack type: Suicide bombing
- Deaths: 5 (including the perpetrator)
- Injuries: 36
- Perpetrators: Mehmet Öztürk; Islamic State of Iraq and the Levant

On 19 March 2016, a suicide bombing took place in Istanbul's Beyoğlu district in front of the district governor's office. The attack occurred at 10:55 (EET) at the intersection of Balo Street with İstiklal Avenue, a central shopping street. The attack caused at least five deaths, including that of the perpetrator. Thirty-six people were injured, including seven whose injuries were severe. Among those injured were twelve foreign tourists. Among those killed, three were of Israeli nationality. On 22 March, the Turkish interior minister said that the bomber had links with ISIL.

== Background ==
The bombing was the fourth suicide bombing in Turkey in 2016, and occurred six days after a bombing in Ankara that left 37 people dead. The United States embassy in Ankara had issued a terrorism warning to its citizens the day before the bombing for Istanbul, Ankara, İzmir and Adana. The German embassy had also issued a security warning to its citizens three days before the bombing. Prime Minister Ahmet Davutoğlu had called the warnings "normal". Germany had also closed its consulate on the avenue on Thursday and Friday as a security measure.

According to BBC, residents of Istanbul had already been vigilant before the attack due to the recent explosion in Ankara and were wary of going out. Following the bombing, according to Cumhuriyet, the Turkish government received heavy criticism on social media for defects in its security.

== Attack ==
The bombing took place on İstiklal Avenue, a shopping area popular with tourists and considered the busiest avenue in Turkey. However, the bombing took place at a time when the avenue was relatively quiet. The site of detonation was a few hundred metres away from a place where police buses are usually parked. According to an eyewitness, the bomber detonated the bomb whilst passing by a group of tourists. Hundreds of people reportedly ran away from the site of attack in panic after the explosion. Nails and small pieces of metal were reportedly scattered in the area due to the attack. Following the bombing, the avenue was closed off to the public. According to a CNN Türk reporter on the scene, the suicide attacker was on his way to the actual target when the bomb went off in front of a restaurant. Another account from a Turkish official (cited by Reuters) states the bomber was "deterred" from his or her actual target by the police and set off the bomb "out of fear". Initial findings pointed to Kurdish perpetrators.

=== Victims ===
Two of the killed victims were American-Israeli citizens, one was Israeli and one was Iranian. One of the victims that died in the explosion was a child. Two of the tourists injured were also children.

Victims by nationality
Nationality	Deaths	Wounded	Total	References
Israel / USA	2	0	2	
Israel	1	6	7	
Iran	1	1	2	
Turkey	0	24	24	
Ireland	0	2	1	
Germany	0	1	1	
Iceland	0	1	1	
United Arab Emirates	0	1	1	
Total	4	36	40	

Israeli authorities identified the three Israeli victims as Yonatan Suher (40 years old) from Tel Aviv, Simcha Dimri (60) from Dimona, and Avraham Goldman (69) from Ramat HaSharon.

The Iranian casualties were identified as Ali Reza Razmkhah (45), who was killed, while his two children Azam and Diana were injured, alongside Zhila Shariat Alaei.

The Başaran family from Adana was among those injured in the blast. The family of four had come to Istanbul as tourists and were shopping and sightseeing in the Istiklal Avenue when the blast occurred. 2.5-year-old Asya Başaran was hit by a metal fragment in the head, whilst her mother, Çilem Başaran, was hit in the shoulder and the groin. They were both life-threateningly injured.

=== Perpetrator ===
While the authorities were quick to blame the Kurdistan Workers' Party (PKK) given the Ankara bombing in February, only upon further investigation in the afternoon, the Turkish authorities changed their initial assessment, now instead holding the Islamic State of Iraq and the Levant (ISIL) accountable. According to Milliyet, Turkish authorities never ruled out ISIL as suspects early on. According to the newspaper, the fact that the attack occurred near a group of tourists indeed suggested an ISIL involvement. PKK umbrella organization KCK said it opposed targeting civilians and condemned attacks on them.

The next day, Turkish authorities announced that Mehmet Öztürk was reliably identified by DNA tests to be the suicide bomber of the Istanbul attack. Born 1992 in Gaziantep Province and thought to be affiliated with ISIL, he was one of two Turkish suspects the authorities were investigating. The day before, Sabah had named Özturk and 33-year-old ISIL militant Savaş Yıldız from Adana, who is also thought to be involved in the October 2015 Ankara bombings killing more than 100 civilians. In the night, authorities arrested Yıldız' parents, but they were released later. Öztürk had reportedly left his house in Gaziantep in 2013, and he was linked to ISIL by authorities after he was reported missing. He had reportedly visited his family one month before the attack. On 18 March, he bought a bus ticket to Istanbul from Adıyaman and arrived in Istanbul on the day of the attack in a bus he took from Adıyaman.

== See also ==
- January 2016 Istanbul bombing
- February 2016 Ankara bombing
- March 2016 Ankara bombing
- List of Islamist terrorist attacks
- List of terrorist incidents, January–June 2016
