= Serhildan =

Kurdish protests and uprisings

- Part of the Kurdish–Turkish conflict
- Date: 14 March 1990 – 12 May 2025
- Location: Eastern and Southeastern Turkey
- Caused by: Suppression of Kurdish language; Institutional racism and discrimination; Banning of pro-Kurdish political parties and political repression; Imprisonment of Abdullah Öcalan; Ban of Newroz celebrations
- Goals: Creation of an autonomous Kurdish region, reinstitution of Kurdish-language education, release of political prisoners and Abdullah Öcalan, end of military operations against Kurdish dissidents
- Methods: Civil disobedience, civil resistance, demonstrations, riots, strike actions, hunger strikes, self-immolations, Spontaneous uprisings, terror, suicide bombings, guerrilla warfare,
- Status: 2025 PKK-Turkey peace process
- Concessions: Kurdish language unbanned in 1991; Newroz celebrations allowed since 1995; Kurdish language broadcasting allowed since 2006; Kurdish initiative by Prime Minister Erdoğan in 2009; Start of Solution process in 2013

Parties
Kurdish Protesters Unorganized Kurdish citizens DBP (2014–present); DEM (2023–present); HDP (2012–present); KCK; HPG; YJA-STAR; YDG-H (2006–15); YPS; YPS-Jin; Mazlumder; Yakay-Der; Peace Mothers; İHD Defunct: HEP (1990–93); DEP (1993–94); HADEP (1994–03); Kurdish Parliament in Exile (1995–98); DEHAP (1997–05); DTH (2005); DTP (2005–09) BDP (2008–14)	Government of Turkey; Turkish Armed Forces; Turkish Land Forces; Turkish Air Force; Turkish Naval Forces; Turkish Gendarmerie; JİTEM; Special Forces Command; General Directorate of Security; Riot Police; Police Special Operation Department; Ministry of Foreign Affairs; National Defense; Ministry of the Interior

Lead figures
Ahmet Fehmi Işıklar; Vedat Aydın †; Murat Bozlak; Ahmet Türk; Aysel Tuğluk; Leyla Zana; Pervin Buldan; Emine Ayna; Sebahat Tuncel; Selim Sadak; Selahattin Demirtaş (POW); Gültan Kışanak; Nurettin Demirtaş; Osman Baydemir; Sırrı Süreyya Önder	Recep Tayyip Erdoğan (2014–present); (Turkey) Cevdet Yılmaz (2023–present); (Turkey) İbrahim Kalın (2023–present); Ali Yerlikaya (2023–present); Yaşar Güler (2023–present); Selçuk Bayraktaroğlu (2025–present); Metin Tokel (2025–present); Ercüment Tatlıoğlu (2017–present); Ziya Cemal Kadıoğlu (2023–present); Ali Çardakcı (2024–present); Ahmet Ercan Çorbacı (2017–present); Erol Ayyıldız (2023–present); Former: (Turkey) Turgut Özal; (Turkey) Süleyman Demirel; (Turkey) Ahmet Necdet Sezer; (Turkey) Abdullah Gül; (Turkey) Yıldırım Akbulut; (Turkey) Mesut Yılmaz; (Turkey) Tansu Çiller; (Turkey) Necmettin Erbakan; (Turkey) Bülent Ecevit; (Turkey) Ahmet Davutoğlu; (Turkey) Binali Yıldırım; (Turkey) Fuat Oktay; (Turkey) Teoman Koman; (Turkey) Sönmez Köksal; (Turkey) Şenkal Atasagun; (Turkey) Emre Taner; (Turkey) Hakan Fidan; Süleyman Soylu; Efkan Ala; Selami Altınok; Sebahattin Öztürk; Muammer Güler; İdris Naim Şahin; Beşir Atalay; Osman Güneş; Muzaffer Ecemiş; Rüştü Kazım Yücelen; Sadettin Tantan; Cahit Bayar; Kutlu Aktaş; Murat Başesgioğlu; Meral Akşener; Mehmet Ağar; Ülkü Güney; Teoman Ünüsan; Nahit Menteşe; Mehmet Gazioğlu; İsmet Sezgin; Sabahattin Çakmakoğlu; Mustafa Kalemli; Abdülkadir Aksu; Hulusi Akar; Nurettin Canikli; Fikri Işık; İsmet Yılmaz; Vecdi Gönül; Sabahattin Çakmakoğlu; Hikmet Sami Türk; İsmet Sezgin; Turhan Tayan; Mahmut Oltan Sungurlu; Vefa Tanır; Mehmet Gölhan; Nevzat Ayaz; Barlas Doğu; Mehmet Yazar; Hüsnü Doğan; Güneş Taner; Safa Giray; Necip Torumtay; Doğan Güreş; İsmail Hakkı Karadayı; Hüseyin Kıvrıkoğlu; Hilmi Özkök; Yaşar Büyükanıt; İlker Başbuğ; Işık Koşaner; Necdet Özel; Hulusi Akar; Ümit Dündar; Yaşar Güler; Doğan Güreş; Muhittin Fisunoğlu; İsmail Hakkı Karadayı; Hikmet Bayar; Hikmet Köksal; Hüseyin Kıvrıkoğlu; Atilla Ateş; Hilmi Özkök; Aytaç Yalman; Yaşar Büyükanıt; İlker Başbuğ; Işık Koşaner; Erdal Ceylanoğlu; Necdet Özel; Hayri Kıvrıkoğlu; Hulusi Akar; Salih Zeki Çolak; Yaşar Güler; Ümit Dündar; Musa Avsever; Orhan Karabulut; İrfan Tınaz; Vural Bayazıt; Güven Erkaya; Salim Dervişoğlu; Ilhami Erdil; Bülent Alpkaya; Özden Örnek; Yener Karahanoğlu; Metin Ataç; Eşref Uğur Yiğit; Emin Murat Bilgel; Bülent Bostanoğlu; Saftar Necioğlu; Siyami Taştan; Halis Burhan; Ahmet Çörekçi; İlhan Kılıç; Ergin Celasin; Cumhur Asparuk; İbrahim Fırtına; Faruk Cömert; Aydoğan Babaoğlu; Hasan Aksay; Mehmet Erten; Akın Öztürk; Abidin Ünal; Hasan Küçükakyüz; Atilla Gülan; Burhanettin Bigalı; Eşref Bitlis; Aydın İlter; Teoman Koman; Fikret Özden Boztepe; Rasim Betir; Aytaç Yalman; Şener Eruygur; Fevzi Türkeri; Işık Koşaner; Atila Işık; Necdet Özel; Bekir Kalyoncu; Servet Yörük; Abdullah Atay; Galip Mendi; İbrahim Yaşar; Yaşar Güler; Attila Kurtaran; Kemal Yılmaz; Fevzi Türkeri; Engin Alan; Nevzat Bekaroğlu; Sadık Ercan; Servet Yörük; Abdullah Barutcu; Halil Soysal; Zekai Aksakallı; Sabahattin Çakmakoğlu; Necati Bilican; Ünal Erkan; Yılmaz Ergun; Mehmet Ağar; Alaaddin Yüksel; Kemal Çelik; Necati Bilican; Turan Genç; İbrahim Kemal Önal; Gökhan Aydıner; Oğuz Kağan Köksal; Mehmet Kılıçlar; Mehmet Celalettin Lekesiz; Selami Altınok; Celal Uzunkaya; Mehmet Aktaş

Casualties and losses
- 179+ killed 1,968+ injured 17,679+ arrested

The word serhildan describes several Kurdish protests and uprisings since the 1990s that used the slogan "Êdî Bese" ("Enough") against Turkey. Local shops are often closed on the day of demonstrations as a form of protest.

Protests are held every year on 15 February, the date of Abdullah Öcalan's capture, and during Newroz on 21 March, the Kurdish New Year.

The Turkish President Recep Tayyip Erdogan has thus far refused to acknowledge the demands of the protests, calling them a conspiracy by an alleged Ergenekon–PKK axis.

== Etymology ==
The word serhildan consists of the Kurdish Kurmanji words ser that means head and hildan that means raise. So the meaning is "rising" or "rebellion". In Zazaki the word for "rebellion" is Serewedaritiş.

Serhildan is sometimes translated as meaning the "Kurdish intifada".

== History ==
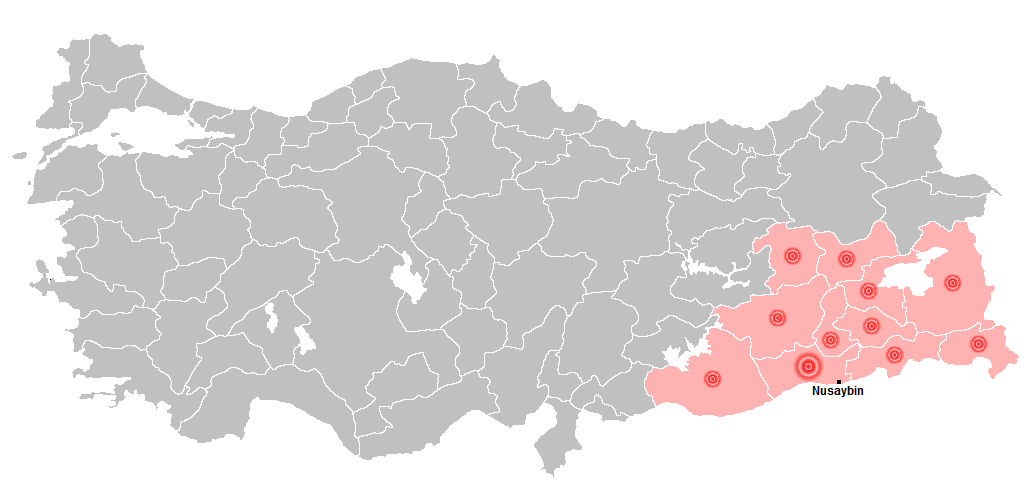
Of the 1990 riots affected provinces and the location of Nusaybin

After the large Kurdish rebellions in the early to mid 20th century - the Koçkiri rebellion, the Sheikh Said rebellion, the Ararat rebellion and the Dersim rebellion - the first of a series of violent actions by the populace against police officers and state institutions in modern times occurred in 1990 in the Southeast Anatolian town of Nusaybin near the border with Syria. The rebellion in Nusaybin marked the beginning of what is sometimes called the serhildan. During the following days the riots expanded to nearby Mardin and to the neighbouring provinces of Batman, Diyarbakır, Siirt, Şanlıurfa and Şırnak. Later they also took in other Eastern Anatolian provinces such as Bingöl, Bitlis, Hakkâri, Muş and Van, as well as cities such as Ankara, Istanbul, İzmir and Mersin.

Since the major riots in 1990 rebellions sometimes occur sporadically, especially after the killing of PKK fighters, around 21 March (Newroz) or on 27 November (the date of the establishment of the PKK). Riots began again at the end of November 2009 and continued without interruption until mid-December. Rioters were protesting that the prison cell of Abdullah Öcalan on İmralı island was too small. Following the closure of the Kurdish party DTP on 11 December 2009 the situation worsened and cost three people their lives. A 23-year-old Kurdish student was killed by a police officer in Diyarbakır. The other two were killed by a shopkeeper in Bulanık after his shop was pelted with Molotov cocktails by the rebels. About 50 people were injured in the riots and over 100 people were arrested.

== Timeline ==
=== 1990–1999 ===
- 14 March 1990, about 5,000 protesters gathered at the funeral of a PKK fighter in Nuseybin. Protesters were fired upon by Turkish troops, over 700 were arrested.
- 15 March 1990, about 15,000 protesters in Cizre clashed with police. 5 protesters were killed, 80 injured and 155 arrested. A total of 200 were arrested that day.
- 21 March 1990, widespread protests in all South-Eastern cities in connection with Newroz.
- 2 June 1990, during a march by 2000 Iraqi Kurdish refugees, clashes with security forces resulted in the injury of a policeman and five protesters
- 2 March 1991, over 1000 rioters fought the Turkish military with stones and sticks in Diyarbakir. One soldier and two protesters were injured, another soldier and two protesters were killed.
- 7 March 1991, nearly 2,000 Kurdish villagers marching in Dargecit were fired on by police. Rioting erupted in which many were injured and 100 were arrested.
- 9 March 1991, over 1,000 protesters including members of the HEP protested against the killing of a woman by police during a riot.
- 15 March 1991, police fired at over 1,000 protesters, injuring many and arresting over 200.
- 20 March 1991, Turkey allowed Nowruz to be celebrated openly for the first time. Despite this, riots erupted in many villages in which police fired at protesters.
- 10 July 1991, police clashed with over 25,000 protesters who were shouting pro-PKK slogans at the funeral of assassinated HEP chairman Vedat Aydın. 12 were killed and 122 wounded.
- 27 November 1991, more than 1,500 shops were closed in Bismil and Idil to mark the PKK's 13th anniversary.
- 10 December 1991, 5,000 students in Diyarbakir boycotted classes in protest of the killing of a fellow student by Turkish security forces.
- 21 February 1992, some 70 rioters clashed with Turkish police in Mardin, one protester was killed and two were injured.
- 21 March 1992, in an event later known as "bloody newroz" tens of thousands of Kurds took to the streets all over Turkey to celebrate Nowruz and clashed with the military. Reports indicated that President Suleyman Demirel ordered the military not to attack civilians, however the army refused to obey these orders and attacked the protests. In several towns including Şırnak and Kulp, the demonstrators were bombed by airraids. In Sirnak, were between 500 and 1,500 PKK fighters entered the town to fight the police, the security forces went on a rampage for 22 hours in which most of the town was destroyed. At least 102 civilians were killed by the security forces, at least 26 of which were in Sirnak, 29 in Cizre, 14 in Nusaybin, one in İzmir and two in Adana. At least one soldier and one policeman were killed by rioters. Also numerous journalists were killed as the military set fire to them. Over 200 people were injured and over 2,000 were arrested.
- 6 April 1992, 60 protesters were arrested in Mersin because the government classified the protests as illegal.
- 15–16 August 1992, thousands of shops were closed and protests erupted all over the South-East to mark the 8th anniversary of the PKK's armed campaign. At least 5 protesters were killed and 130 arrested.
- 21 March 1993, in accordance with a PKK-government cease-fire, Nowruz celebrations were not attacked by the military. Several minor protests were however broken up.
- 14 August 1993, police forces opened fire at a Kurdish protest in Digor, killing 10 and wounding 51 protesters.
- 3 August 1994, Kurds protested the trial of 6 Democracy Party politicians, for treason.
- 19 May 1995, over 1,000 Kurds demonstrate against the killing of a Kurd by Turkish government linked death squads.
- 15 February 1999, massive riots broke out in all major cities of the country as Kurds protested Abdullah Öcalan's arrest. Over 1,000 protesters were arrested during clashes with security forces.
- 21 March 1999, large unrest broke out on Nowruz and police put the South-East under a virtual state of siege. Eyewitnesses reported police and military active in every city. In Istanbul, over 1,000 people were arrested as protesters exchanged gunfire with security forces several times. In Başkale, a suicide bomber killed himself and injured 3 people during the protests and in Mardin a bomb damaged a pipeline. There were sporadic clashes in other cities. In Diyarbakır alone, over 4,000 people were detained.

=== 2000–2010 ===
- 21 February 2000, in Diyarbakır, 1,500 people rallied to protest the detention of three Kurdish mayors by the Turkish state.
- 25 November 2000, Turkish police prevented hundreds of Kurds from going to Ankara for a protest.
- 3 February 2001, 60 demonstrators are arrested in Siirt for protesting against the mysterious disappearance of People's Democracy Perty (HADEP), party workers on 25 January.
- 5 February 2001, 16 activists are detained during protests in Batman, against the disappearance of HADEP members on 15 January.
- 6 February 2001, during a sixth day of protests, police break up crowds in Diyarbakir.
- 15 February 2001, police arrested over 100 people in demonstrations marking the second anniversary of Abdullah Ocalan's capture.
- 21 March 2001, over 100 people are arrested during Nowruz celebrations in Istanbul.
- 28 July 2001, during a festival in Tunceli, police tried to prevent a HADEP politician from addressing the crowd. The crowd responded by pelting police with stones, resulting in the injury of eight policemen and one member of the crowd.
- 31 August 2001, thousands gathered in Diyarbakir to travel to Ankara to celebrate World Peace Day on 1 September. Turkish authorities however tried to prevent them from entering busses and clashes erupted in which 19 people were injured.
- 25 January 2002, a demonstration was staged in Siirt marking the 1-year anniversary of the disappearance of 2 HADEP politicians. Police tried to break up the crowd and during clashes four policemen and four demonstrators were injured, 70 people were arrested.
- 21 March 2002, in Diyarbakir thousands of police clash with Kurds as authorities banned public Nowruz celebrations that year. 2 protesters were crushed to death during a police crackdown in Mersin.
- 27 March 2002, over 1,000 people including HADEP members marched to send a symbolical fax to parliament in Kurdish, calling on the parliament to legalize the use of the Kurdish language. Over 100, including several senior HADEP politicians were arrested during the march.
- 22 June 2005, Turkish police opened automatic gun-fire on 250 stone-throwing Kurdish protesters who tried to reclaim the bodies of two killed PKK-rebels. One protester was killed and seven people, including two journalists were injured.
- 20 November 2005, 12 Kurdish demonstrators are detained after hurling Molotov cocktails and stones at police in Istanbul.
- 21 November 2005, Turkish Prime Minister Recep Tayyip Erdogan came to the Kurdish Southeast of Turkey to urge protesters to calm down, after weeks of rioting. He promised the protesters that his government would investigate charges that the Turkish Deep state and not Kurdish guerillas, were responsible for a recent, fatal, bombing. In the two weeks of rioting, a total of four protesters were killed.
- 22 November 2005, during protests, a gunman opened fire at a primary school, killing a teacher and injuring four people.
- 15 February 2006, protesters allegedly armed with stones and firebombs defended themselves against police all over the southeast to mark the 7th anniversary of Abdullah Öcalan's capture.
- 21 March 2006, over 100,000 Kurds came out in the streets celebrating Nowruz. During these celebrations they allegedly said pro-PKK slogans and called for the release of Abdullah Öcalan.
- 28 March 2006, thousands of protesters demonstrated at the funeral of 14 Kurdish soldiers that had been killed by the Turkish military on 25 March. The protesters allegedly hurled firebombs at police and police vehicle while smashing the windows of police stations to defend themselves. Over 40 people were injured, including two policemen who were allegedly stabbed by protesters and two were killed during the riots.
- 29 March 2006, during a second day of riots police used water cannons and pepper spray against protesters. An official said that three people had been killed and 250 had been injured, that day.
- 30 March 2006, over 20 people were injured in a third day of rioting, during which rioters hurled firebombs at the police and police opened fire on the crowds.
- 31 March 2006, a bomb explosion during riots in Istanbul left 1 dead and 13 injured. A total of 500 were injured during these 48 hours.
- 1 April 2006, fresh clashes erupted between protesters and security forces, which left one protester dead and over ten people injured. A total of 268 protesters had been arrested by 1 April.
- 2 April 2006, during the sixth day of violence, a protester was killed in the southeast as police opened fire to disperse crowds. In Istanbul a group of men poured gasoline into a bus and set it on fire as they pushed the vehicle into pedestrians, killing three people. The total death toll from 28 March to 2 April rose to 15.
- 21 March 2007, violence broke out during Nowruz celebrations. Over 100,000 people attended the celebrations in Diyarbakir and over 50,000 in Istanbul, where students unveiled a large portrait of Abdullah Öcalan, while the crowds chanted "Real democracy or nothing." In Mersin, over 1,000 Kurdish youths clashed with the police, while in İzmir a protester hit a bus with a molotov cocktail, setting the vehicle ablaze. Two buses were pelted with stones and sticks in Istanbul, injuring several passengers. At least 22 protesters were detained.
- 2 November 2007, over 5,000 Kurds protested in Turkey against a possible incursion into Iraq's Kurdistan Region.
- 15 February 2008, thousands of Kurds fought police in the southeast on the 9th anniversary of Abdullah Öcalan's capture.
- 21 March 2008, clashes erupted between Kurds celebrating Nowruz and security forces as Kurdish crowds chanted pro-PKK slogans. Over 200,000 PKK-supporters took part in the demonstrations in Diyarbakir, Van and Yüksekova.
- 22 March 2008, dozens of people are arrested and detained in a second day of protests as police use truncheons and tear-gas on protesters.
- 24 March 2008, a fourth day of protests in Turkey leaves a total toll of two protesters killed, 38 protesters and 15 policemen injured and 130 protesters arrested.
- 20 October 2008, demonstrations were staged by Kurds all over Turkey after allegations that Abdullah Öcalan was being mistreated in prison. One demonstrator was killed in clashes with Turkish security forces. In Sirnak, 129 people were detained and in Yukesova, 10 were detained. Among the detainees were over 50 minors, who were charged for terrorism, due to the ethnic nationalistic character of the demonstrations.
- 15 February 2009, Turkish police clashed with stone-throwing demonstrators, marking the 10-year anniversary of Abdullah Öcalan's capture. Over 100,000 Kurds came out in the streets in all the Kurdish towns in Turkey The protests occurred mainly in Diyarbakir were 15,000 protesters took the streets. A total of 71 people, including 20 police officers were injured and 191 people were arrested during the protests.
- 29 March 2009, Kurds protested the 2009 Turkish local elections.
- 20 April 2009, several civil society organisations demonstrated in front of the DTP's headquarters in Ankara, against the recent arrest of DTP members. Police arrested 50 of the protesters
- 5 August 2009, Kurdish demonstrators clashed with police in Diyarbakir, injuring one policeman as police were pelted with molotov cocktails and stones. 11 demonstrators were arrested.
- 27 November – 1 December 2009, there are four days of violent protests on the 31st anniversary of the foundation of the PKK.
- 6 December 2009, over 15,000 protesters gathered in Diyarbakir to demonstrate against the alleged mistreatment of Abdullah Öcalan in Turkish jail. 1 protester was killed and 2 were injured as police opened fire on the protests, an additional 113 people were arrested at the protests. Two people were also injured during protests in Yuksekova.
- 12 December 2009, large scale protests break out all over the southeast in response to the banning of the DTP by Turkey's supreme court. Protesters threw rocks and firebombs at the police. During protests in Van, a young girl and five policemen were hospitalised, this included a police chief. Over 20 demonstrators were detained in Van. In Hakkâri protesters tried to lynch a police chief and a police officer who were saved by DTP managers. In Beytüşşebap and Cizre, protests continued into the late night. Protesters in Beytüşşebap threw molotov cocktails at the post office, bank offices and the local governor's house. In Cizre they blocked the road to the Habur Customs Gate on the Iraqi border, at night until police intervened. In Istanbul's Sultangazi and Başakşehir districts over 200 demonstrators closed traffic by throwing stones at cars and buses.
- 13 December 2009, angry crowds of Turkish Nationalists and Kurdish Nationalists clashed in Istanbul during a second day of pro-DTP protests. During street battles at least 1 person was killed from gunshot wounds.
- 14 December 2009, at least three Kurdish protesters are shot dead and seven are injured in Bulanık during a third day of protests.
- 21 March 2010, over 50,000 Kurds gathered to celebrate Nowruz. The crowd chanted slogans like "Democratic solution or democratic resistance" and "Blood for blood, we are with you Öcalan."
- 12 November 2010, thousands demonstrated in Diyarbakir against the KCK trial, as Peace and Democracy Party chairman Selahattin Demirtaş addressed the crowd.
- A total of 3,706 people were detained in the Kurdish provinces during 2010

=== 2011–2012 ===
- 13 January 2011, protests were held against the trial of 152 Kurdish activists, during which protesters defended themselves by throwing firebombs and stones at the police who attacked the protesters with water cannons and tear gas.
- 14 January 2011, thousands protested in Diyarbakır, Cizre, Batman, Hakkâri and Şırnak against police brutality against protesters on 13 January. Some 8,000 protesters had gathered in Diyarbakir's central square and they were joined by another 10,000 people for a protest march. Protesters clashed with police in front of the courthouse were Kurdish politicians were being trialed. Police tried to set up a barricade, which demonstrators attacked with fireworks and molotov cocktails, police responded with tear gas.
- 15 February 2011, Over 20,000 people demonstrated in Diyarbakir, Van and Ergani on the 12th anniversary of the capture of Öcalan. Authorities arrested 19 BDP members in response to the protests for "violating the law on Demonstrations and Protests" and "making propaganda for an illegal organization." In Diyarbakir police used tear gas to prevent some 2,000 protesters from marching to the city's central square, at least one policeman and one protester were injured during the clashes and over 20 protesters were arrested. Some 30 demonstrators were arrested in Batman and another 50 were arrested in Hakkâri, Van and Sanliurfa. In Diyarbakir the body was found of 17-year-old student who set himself on fire, after Mohamed Bouazizi set himself on fire, sparking the Tunisian Revolution and Arab Spring.
- 17 February 2011, 3,000 demonstrators clashed with police in Diyarbakir, 46 of which were arrested due to acts of violence.
- 18 February 2011, 20,000 Kurds marched Diyarbakir against police brutality. The march, heading towards Koşuyolu Park however conflict arose after police attacked the March in Bayramoglu district. Several protesters were injured and 6 teenagers, with blood stains on their face were arrested by the police.
- 21 March 2011, BDP-activists gathered 10,000s of people for a Nowruz rally in Diayrbakir. Police surrounded the rally and then stormed it forcing hundreds of people to flee. During the crackdown against protests, the police covered nearly the entire city in a layer of teargas, resulting in many people collapsing while running away from the tear gas. Organisers claim a total of 500,000 people participated in the protests nationwide.
- 24 March 2011, over 3,000 Kurds gathered for a civil disobedience campaign called for by the BDP. At least 70 of them were arrested by Turkish authorities. During the protest they demanded education in Kurdish, the release of all jailed PKK members and political prisoners, end all military operations against Kurds and lift the 10% election threshold.
- 28 March, over 40,000 Kurds came from all over Turkey to march to the Kasapderesi mass-graves in the Siirt province, where the bodies of 200 Kurds killed by the Turkish Deep State had been dumped. The march was organised to be on the same day as the 25 anniversary of the death of Mahsun Korkmaz, who was the first commander of the PKK's military forces and was killed by Turkish forces in 1986. The protesters were barred from entering the city of Siirt as police barricaded the roads and scattered the protesters, using tear gas.
- 19–20 April 2011, two days of major rioting, which continued on 21 April, broke out in response to the banning of 12 Kurdish politicians from the 2011 parliamentary elections. In the first day an 18-year-old protester was killed by police, during the second day over 30,000 people attended his funeral in Batman, which resulted in major riots against the police. In Van, protesters hurled molotov cocktails at police stations in response to the killing. A total of 16 people were arrested during the protests.
- 21 April 2011, as a crowd of some 800 protesters clashed with security forces in Diyarbakir, one protester was killed as police opened fire on the crowd with live rounds.
- 26 April 2011, the pro-Kurdish Peace and Democracy Party (BDP), held a march which was attended by over 20,000 protesters.
- 14 May 2011, a rally was held by Kurdish and left-wing Turkish parties in Diyarbakir's İstasyon Square. Over 50,000 people attended the rally. The crowds chanted slogans in favor of a peaceful and democratic solution to the Kurdish issue.
- 16 May 2011, protests were held in Istanbul by supporters of the BDP, against the military operations. BDP candidates Sabahat Tuncel and Sırrı Süreyya Önder attended the demonstrations. When protesters attempted to hold a peaceful march, they were attacked by riot police, which used tear gas, this resulted in riots in which the protesters pelted police with bottles, rocks and fireworks. In Diyarbakir almost all shops and businesses were closed as a protests. The CHP also closed their election office in Diyarbakir.
- 18 May 2011, Kurdish protests occurred all over the country, in Şanlıurfa 9 protesters were arrested for singing a PKK march song, in Istanbul 15 masked men threw rocks and molotov cocktails at a municipality bus. In Van over 1,000 people held a march to protest the deaths of 12 PKK members, led by the city's Kurdish mayor. Further demonstrations were held in Şırnak, Batman and İzmir. A total of 2,506 Kurdish protesters had been detained from 21 March to 18 May, 308 were injured and at least 2 were killed.
- 21 May 2011, when Turkish Prime Minister Recep Tayyip Erdoğan visited Hakkâri, groups of Kurds came out to protest his visit. Majority of the city's shop-keepers closed their stores as a form of protest against the Prime Minister. Erdoğan refused to acknowledge the people were protesting him, blaming the city's mayor Fadıl Bedirhanoğlu for allegedly forcing people to protest him by fining those who didn't. Less than 1,000 people attended Erdoğan's speech, while 2 days later, much larger crowds attended a rally of opposition leader Kemal Kılıçdaroğlu, who criticised Erdoğan's allegations against the mayor and promised to get rid of the 10% threshold and give autonomy to local Kurdish authorities.
- 22 May 2011, over 30,000 mourners attended a funeral of PKK militant Ramazan Terzioğlu in Hakkâri. The mayors of Hakkâri, Yüksekova, Şemdinli, Çukurca and Esendere all attended the funeral and BDP parliamentary candidate Esat Canan spoke at the funeral. After the funeral the crowds set up barricades and started a major fire. Riot-police attacked the protesters with tear gas and high-pressure water cannons. There were two explosions during the protest but they did not cause any injuries.
- 27 May 2011, thirty demonstrators closed the İdil highway to traffic with barricades and threw a molotov cocktail at a student dormitory of an Islamist school in Cizre, Şırnak, injuring 3 students. Seven demonstrators were arrested by Turkish authorities as Erdoğan blamed the BDP and PKK, claiming these Kurdish parties want to kill children.
- 28 August 2011, thousands of people from 16 different provinces marched towards the Turkish-Iraqi border in protest of a Turkish bombing campaign targeting PKK bases. The rioters attacked the police, which used tear gas resulting in the death of Yildirim Ayhan, a member of Van province's provincial assembly, who was taking part in the protests.
- A demonstration led by BDP MP Sebahat Tuncel against PKK leader Abdullah Öcalan's isolation in prison, in Istanbul's Taksim square, was broken up by police. 120 people were arrested.
- December, 29, after the Uludere airstrike killed 35 Kurdish smugglers in Sirnak, mass protests broke out in most Kurdish cities inside Turkey. In Istanbul, over 1,000 Kurds demonstrated in Taksim Square, during which several hundred of the protesters threw stones at the police and smashed vehicles before police used water cannons on the demonstration.
- 30 December, thousands of mourners attended the funeral of the Uludere airstrike victims. During the funeral, family members of the victims called on PKK militants to take revenge, accusing the Turkish state of being murderers.
- 31 December 2011, activists staged demonstrations in Ankara, demanding the government prosecute those responsible for the air raid. In Diyarbakir and several other locations violent protests erupted in which police used batons and tear gas against protesters and protesters threw stones and Molotov cocktails at police. District Governor Naif Yavuz, while visiting the village were the airstrike occurred to offer his condolences, was attacked by an angry mob that repeatedly punched him, threw stones at him and attempted to lynch him. Six people were arrested due to involvement in the incident In Diyarbakir, two boys were shot in the street, according to police they were members of the PKK which died in a gun battle, although several eyewitnesses dispute the account. Several hundred protesters gathered near the site were the boys were shot, resulting in a riot in which one man was injured and ten detained.
- 14 January 2012, some 300 Kurds demonstrated in Istanbul against the arrest of 49 suspected KCK members.
- 15 February 2012, tens of thousands of Kurds protested to demand Öcalan's freedom on the 13th anniversary of his capture. Demonstrations were held in Adana, Adıyaman, Antep, Batman, Bingöl, Tunceli, Elazığ, Erzurum, Iğdır, Hatay, Kars, Mersin, Siirt, Van and its Bostaniçi, Gevaş, Muradiye, Gürpınar and Saray districts, Ağrı and its Doğubayazıt district, Hakkari and its Yüksekova district, Muş and its Bulanık district, Diyarbakir and its Kocaköy, Hilvan, Bismil, Silvan and Dicle districts, Şanlıurfa and its Viranşehir, Suruç and Ceylanpınar districts, Mardin and its Midyat, Kızıltepe, Derik, Dargeçit, Mazıdağı and Nusaybin districts, Şırnak and its Güçlükonak, Cizre and Beytüşşebap districts as well as İzmir, Aydın, Istanbul and Bodrum. Police arrested three in Diyarbakir and 24 in Istanbul when attempting to stop the demonstrations. In Cizre street fighting between rioters and police lasted for hours.
- 18 March 2012, after the BDP and PKK both called for protests, tens of thousands of protesters came together in Diyarbakir waving Kurdish flags and holding up posters of Abdullah Öcalan, chanting "long live the leader Apo," and "the PKK is the people." Hundreds of riot police backed by armored vehicles and helicopters took up strategic positions in the city to prevent several marches from coming together in one large crowd. This resulted in widespread protest all over the city in which protesters allegedly burned down at least four mobile telephone relay stations. In Istanbul police tried to prevent two groups of 1,000 protesters from coming together. Haci Zengin, the head of an Istanbul branch of the BDP, was killed during the protests after being hit on the head by a tear gas canister. Police detained 106 people at the demonstration and nine were injured
- 20 March 2012, two police officers were shot in Yüksekova in Hakkari province. In Batman, Ahmet Turk was taken to hospital after suffering from the effects of teargas fired to disperse crowds at the protests he was attending, a total of 15 people were injured during protests in the city. In Şanlıurfa the police countered the protesters with water cannons and fired live ammunition at a manifestation attended by Leyla Zana. In Mersin a great number of protesters were arrested. In Cizre over 5,000 protesters clashed with police, hurling petrol bombs and fireworks at the police. Police also clashed with demonstrators in Istanbul. A total of 24 people were injured. One of the policemen injured in Yüksekova died of his wounds the next day.
- 21 March 2012, protests continued for a fourth day. Though less violent than the protests on previous days, this marked the most violent Nowruz celebration since the 1990s. At the same day PKK attacks killed 5 policemen in the mountains outside Sirnak and injured one in a bombing of the AKP's Diyarbakir headquarters.
- 14 July 2012, Diyarbakır was the scene of major protests and clashes between PKK supporters and the police as the pro-Kurdish BDP insisted on holding a rally to commemorate the 30 year anniversary of the 1982 hunger strike in Diyarbakır prison in which the prominent PKK members Mazlum Doğan, Kemal Pir, Hayri Durmuş, Ali Çiçek and Akif Yılmaz died. The rally that had been banned by the provincial government. Over 10,000 police were used to prevent the protesters from gathering in İstasyon Square while over 300 BDP protests held sit-ins in Sümer Park. According to the Turkish government, the protests resulted in 76 injured, including 23 policemen, although human rights organizations believe the number may be much higher. The injured included BDP Deputy President Pervin Buldan, BDP MPs Ayla Akat Ata from Batman and Mülkiye Birtane from Kars, the BDP's Diyarbakır Provincial Head Zübeyde Zümrüt, Diyarbakır Mayor Osman Baydemir and Remzi Akkaya. 87 people were arrested.
- 3 August 2012, a protest is held after a speech by Leyla Zana calling for Abdullah Öcalan to be transferred from prison to house arrest. Police arrested over 100 people at the protest.
- 25 August 2012, thousands of people rallied in Cizre to attend a protest organized by the BDP, attended by Cizre mayor Mustafa Gören. The Turkish government did not give permission for the protest to be held, citing alleged display of pro-PKK propaganda as the reason. Police were sent to fight the protesters and violence ensued.
- 30 October 2012, protests were held in Diyarbakır, Van, Hakkâri, Cizre and Silopi, all stores were closed and streets were empty aside from protesters which marched in solidarity with the hunger strike. Over 10,000 protesters clashed with police in Diyarbakır, which used tear gas to disperse the crowd. Nine people were detained.
- 31 October 2012, several thousand Kurds held a protest march in Diyarbakır in support of a hunger strike held in Turkish prisons by Kurdish political prisoners. The protesters clashed with police, who used tear gas and water cannon, throwing stones and firebombs at the police. As part of the protest, all shops were closed and families didn't send their children to school. In Van several thousand people also marched towards the town's prison, were 182 inmates were in a hunger strike. In Istanbul a sit-in was held by a group of protesters which were dispersed by 100 policemen using pepper spray. Protesters attempted to march to a tent in Okmeydanı were Peace Mothers were camping, but the tent was attacked by police which used tear gas on the women. 10 people suffered injuries and 18 were detained.
- 3 November 2012, protests in Cizre and Diyarbakir at a funeral of a PKK militant killed by the Turkish military, resulted in clashes between protesters and riot police. 20 protesters were arrested.

== Bibliography ==
- İlhan Gülsün: PKK ve şer odakları. Istanbul 1998. ISBN 978-975-7841-40-1. (Turkish)
