= Civil–military relations during the Recep Tayyip Erdoğan government =

During the Recep Tayyip Erdoğan government, civil–military relationship moved towards normalization in which the influence of the military was reduced. During its nine-year reign, the ruling Justice and Development Party, or AKP, has often faced off against the military, gaining political power by challenging a pillar of the country's laicistic establishment.

The ruling party, which came to power following the November 3, 2002 general elections, is not the first government to have tangled with the military in Turkey, where the powerful Turkish Armed Forces, or TSK, has periodically carried out coups d’état since the 1960s. But the shift in the balance of power in civil-military ties has been one of the most important changes the AKP has made to Turkey's political landscape.

Under the party's tenure, the military, while it remains suspicious of the motives of the AKP, has become much less enthusiastic about making public statements on political issues and more cooperative in efforts to further align Turkey's standards to those of the European Union even when such moves would curb the TSK's own powers.

== Chiefs of the General Staff during Erdoğan's term of office ==
The following persons have served as Chief of the General Staff since 2002:

- Hilmi Özkök (2002-2006)
- Yaşar Büyükanıt (2006-2008)
- İlker Başbuğ (2008-2010)
- Işık Koşaner (2010-2011)
- Necdet Özel (2011-2015)
- Hulusi Akar (2015–2018)
- Yaşar Güler (2018–2023)
- Metin Gürak (2023-)

== History ==
=== Rise of Justice and Development Party ===
Since the first AKP government in late 2002, the military, which sees itself as the guardian of the laicistic, democratic and republican Turkish state, monitored what it saw as a “pro-Islamic party” aiming to undermine the country's laicistic regime. The military had successfully challenged the Islamic Welfare Party in 1996, overthrowing the government of prime minister Necmettin Erbakan following the months-long struggle known as the February 28 process. The process resulted in Erbakan's resignation from the government and the dissolution of his party by the Constitutional Court.

In the 2000s, however, the political landscape was not as favorable for military influence in politics. The first reason for this shift was the European Union membership process, which nurtured the notion of democratization in the country; another was the election victory of the AKP that brought this “democratic conservative party” a clear majority in Parliament in 2002. Having seen what the political choices of many of its members led to in the past, the AKP resolved to be firm in confronting the military this time around.

Negotiating for membership in the European Union, which was highly critical of the military's influence in politics, no doubt strengthened the AKP's hand. The three-party coalition that previously led the country had already taken initial steps in 2001 and 2002 to stem this influence, helping prepare a suitable environment for the AKP to further move against the political influence of the military.

“Since 1999, civilian control of the military has been strengthened. The constitutional and legal framework has been amended to clarify the position of the armed forces versus the civilian authorities,” the European Union said in its 2004 Progress Report on Turkey, which cited various developments with regard to civil-military ties. “A number of changes have been introduced over the last year to strengthen civilian control of the military with a view to aligning it with practice in EU member states.”

In 2001, the coalition party had amended the law governing the National Security Council, or MGK, turning the country's top security board into an advisory board with an increased number of civilian members. The AKP further amended the duties and composition of the National Security Council in 2003, a move that paved the way for the appointment of a civilian secretary and reduced the frequency of the council's meetings to once every two months.

In an attempt to strengthen Parliament's supervision over the military's budget concerning defense expenditures, the government initiated amendments to the Law on Public Financial Management and Control in 2003. Though there are still difficulties in implementing these amendments, the change established a new base for full parliamentary oversight of defense expenditures. In addition, it was under the government of the AKP that the military's budget became smaller than the education budget.

In 2006, an amendment made to the Military Criminal Code prevented military courts from trying civilians in peacetime unless military personnel and civilians commit a crime together. That was followed by legislation in 2009 that allowed civilian courts to try military personnel in peacetime for crimes subject to the Heavy Penal Court. In 2010, the EMASYA protocol, a secret blueprint that allowed the military to conduct operations for internal matters under certain conditions without a request from civilian authorities, was annulled with the consent of the chief of General Staff.

In 2010, a constitutional amendment approved by the people in a referendum paved the way for military personnel expelled through Supreme Military Council, or YAŞ, decisions to appeal.

=== April 27 memorandum ===
Despite the AKP's legal moves to diminish the means by which the military could interfere in the political field, the army continued to exercise significant political influence. Chiefs of General Staff, force commanders and lesser-ranking military personnel did not hesitate to express their opinions on domestic and foreign policy issues, many of which were critical of the government.

The biggest issue that caused deep fissures between the army and the government was the midnight e-memorandum posted on the military's website objecting to the selection of Foreign Minister Abdullah Gül as the ruling party's candidate for the Presidency in 2007. The military argued that the election of Gül, whose wife wears an Islamic headscarf, could undermine the laicistic order of the country.

Contrary to expectations, the government responded harshly to former Chief of General Staff Gen. Yaşar Büyükanıt’s e-memorandum, saying the selection of the presidential candidate had nothing to do with the military. This challenge was followed by a confidential meeting between Büyükanıt and Prime Minister Recep Tayyip Erdoğan at Dolmabahçe Palace.

Despite all the tension, Gül was eventually elected president, becoming the first head of Turkey whose wife is covered. This has continued to be an issue between Gül and the military, as top generals have avoided participating in official events where First Lady Hayrünnisa Gül would also be present.

=== Prosecutions ===
The ruling party has backed prosecutors who launched judicial proceedings against senior military personnel, including former four-star generals, in regard to alleged coup plots against the government in 2003 and 2004. As part of the Ergenekon and Balyoz (Sledgehammer) cases, hundreds of retired and active-duty military personnel, as well as other prominent figures, have been arrested by prosecutors on charges of attempting to overthrow the government. The cases marked the first time such high-ranking military personnel had been accused of anti-democratic moves and prosecuted by civilian prosecutors.
