= List of commanders of the Aegean Army =

This list includes commanders of the Aegean Army, who were, in their time of service, nominal heads of the Aegean Army (Turkish: Ege Ordusu), one of the four field armies of the Turkish Land Forces.

The current Commander of the Aegean Army is General Kemal Yeni, since 18 August 2022.

No.	Commander	Picture	Took office	Left office
1	General Turgut Sunalp		30 August 1975	30 August 1976
2	General Kenan Evren		30 August 1976	30 August 1977
3	General Ali Sait Özçivril		30 August 1977	30 August 1980
4	General Haydar Saltık		30 August 1980	25 August 1981
5	General Süreyya Yüksel		25 August 1981	30 August 1984
6	General Hakkı Akansel		30 August 1984	30 August 1985
7	General Kemal Yamak		30 August 1985	24 July 1987
8	General Muhittin Fisunoğlu		24 July 1987	23 August 1989
9	General Fikret Küpeli		23 August 1989	25 August 1991
10	General Doğan Bayazıt		25 August 1991	26 August 1992
11	General Hikmet Köksal		26 August 1992	22 August 1994
12	General Necati İkizoğlu		22 August 1994	25 August 1996
13	General Fikret Özden Boztepe		26 August 1996	25 August 1997
14	General Doğu Aktulga		25 August 1997	30 August 1999
15	General Çetin Doğan		30 August 1999	17 August 2001
16	General Hurşit Tolon		17 August 2001	20 August 2004
17	General Işık Koşaner		20 August 2004	17 August 2005
18	General Fethi Remzi Tuncel		17 August 2005	17 August 2006
19	General Şükrü Sarıışık		17 August 2006	30 August 2007
20	General Necdet Özel		30 August 2007	24 August 2008
21	General Hayri Kıvrıkoğlu		24 August 2008	22 August 2010
22	General Nusret Taşdeler		24 August 2010	25 August 2011
23	General Abdullah Atay		25 August 2011	22 August 2014
24	General Galip Mendi		22 August 2014	11 August 2015
25	General Abdullah Recep		11 August 2015	22 August 2019
26	Lieutenant general Ali Sivri		22 August 2019	18 August 2022
27	General Kemal Yeni		18 August 2022	Incumbent

== See also ==
- Chief of the Turkish General Staff
- List of commanders of the Turkish Land Forces
