= List of commanders of the First Army of Turkey =

This list includes commanders of the First Army of Turkey, who were, in their time of service, nominal heads of the First Army (Turkish: Birinci Ordu), one of the four field armies of the Turkish Land Forces.

The current Commander of the First Army is General Ali Sivri, since 18 August 2022.

No.	Commander	Picture	Took office	Left office
1	Major general Ali İhsan Sâbis		9 October 1921	19 June 1922
2	Lieutenant general Nureddin İbrahim Konyar		29 June 1922	15 August 1923
3	Lieutenant general Kâzım Karabekir		21 October 1923	26 October 1924
4	General Ali Sait Akbaytogan		26 October 1924	21 November 1933
5	General Fahrettin Altay		22 November 1933	19 December 1943
6	General Cemil Cahit Toydemir		17 December 1943	15 June 1946
7	General Salih Omurtak		17 June 1946	29 July 1946
8	General Nuri Yamut		9 August 1946	1 July 1949
9	General Asım Tınaztepe		8 July 1949	23 June 1950
10	General Şükrü Kanatlı		24 June 1950	27 December 1951
11	General Zekâi Okan		27 December 1951	11 August 1952
12	General Nurettin Baransel		4 November 1952	6 April 1954
13	General Hakkı Tunaboylu		6 April 1954	13 July 1955
14	General Ahmet Nurettin Aknoz		9 September 1955	16 June 1956
15	Lieutenant general Vedat Garan		16 June 1956	22 June 1956
16	General Nazmi Ataç		16 June 1956	19 September 1957
17	General Fazıl Bilge		13 December 1957	1 September 1958
18	General Fahrettin Özdilek		30 August 1958	10 June 1960
19	General Mehmet Muzaffer Alankuş		6 June 1960	4 August 1960
20	General Cemal Tural		1 August 1960	25 September 1962
21	General Ahmet Refik Yılmaz		25 September 1962	19 March 1966
22	General Memduh Tağmaç		16 July 1966	22 August 1968
23	General Haydar Sükan		22 August 1968	29 August 1969
24	General Kemal Atalay		29 August 1969	29 September 1970
25	General Faik Türün		29 September 1970	14 August 1973
26	General Hüseyin Doğan Özgöçmen		14 August 1973	25 August 1975
27	General Adnan Ersöz		25 August 1975	30 August 1977
28	General Nurettin Ersin		30 August 1977	8 March 1978
29	General Necdet Üruğ		15 March 1978	25 August 1981
30	General Haydar Saltık		25 August 1981	22 August 1983
31	General Necdet Öztorun		22 August 1983	23 August 1984
32	General Necip Torumtay		24 August 1984	11 August 1985
33	General Recep Orhan Ergun		11 August 1985	24 July 1987
34	General Doğan Güreş		3 August 1987	23 August 1989
35	General Muhittin Fisunoğlu		23 August 1989	31 December 1990
36	General İsmail Hakkı Karadayı		1 January 1991	17 August 1993
37	General Hikmet Bayar		17 August 1993	22 August 1994
38	General Hikmet Köksal		22 August 1994	26 August 1996
39	General Hüseyin Kıvrıkoğlu		26 August 1996	26 August 1997
40	General Atilla Ateş		26 August 1997	18 August 1998
41	General Çevik Bir		18 August 1998	20 August 1999
42	General Hilmi Özkök		20 August 1999	21 August 2000
43	General Necdet Yılmaz Timur		21 August 2000	17 August 2001
44	General Çetin Doğan		17 August 2001	20 August 2003
45	General Yaşar Büyükanıt		20 August 2003	20 August 2004
46	General Hurşit Tolon		20 August 2004	19 August 2005
47	General İlker Başbuğ		19 August 2005	17 August 2006
48	General Fethi Remzi Tuncel		17 August 2006	17 August 2007
49	General İsmail Koçman		17 August 2007	22 August 2008
50	General Ergin Saygun		22 August 2008	30 August 2009
51	General Hasan Iğsız		30 August 2009	5 August 2010
52	General Erdal Ceylanoğlu		5 August 2010	8 August 2010
53	General Hayri Kıvrıkoğlu		8 August 2010	4 August 2011
54	General Yalçın Ataman		4 August 2011	23 August 2013
55	General Ahmet Turmuş		23 August 2013	25 August 2014
56	General Salih Zeki Çolak		25 August 2014	10 August 2015
57	General Ümit Dündar		10 August 2015	28 July 2016
58	General Musa Avsever		28 July 2016	13 August 2021
59	Lieutenant General Kemal Yeni		24 August 2021	18 August 2022
60	General Ali Sivri		18 August 2022	Incumbent

== See also ==
- Chief of the Turkish General Staff
- List of commanders of the Turkish Land Forces

== Sources ==
- Haşim Söylemez, "Birinci Ordu, kıt’a dur!", Aksiyon, Sayı: 778 / Tarih: 2 November 2009. (in Turkish)
