= Cosmic Room incident =

2009 incident in Turkey

The Cosmic Room incident refers to the searches conducted in 2009 that were based on allegations that Deputy Speaker of the Grand National Assembly of Turkey (TBMM) Bülent Arınç was being unlawfully followed in the mobilization and special warfare structure of the Turkish Armed Forces, one of its most secret units, under a civilian judicial order for the first time. The incident became a symbolic case in Turkey's recent political and military history due to its legal nature, implications for state secrecy, and civil–military relations.

== Emergence of the incident ==
The incident came to public attention in December 2009, when two military personnel were seen near the Ankara residence of Bülent Arınç, leading to an investigation based on allegations of an assassination plot against him. It was reported that some officers serving in the mobilization unit in Ankara's Çukurambar district were stopped by police, and that documents containing addresses and sketches related to Arınç and certain government members were allegedly found.

== Search warrant and the "cosmic room" ==
Following the assassination allegations, special-authority prosecutors requested a search of the rooms within the Ankara Mobilization Inspection Board/Mobilization Regional Directorate—publicly known as the "Cosmic Room", which was approved by a magistrate judge. The searches were conducted from late 2009 into early 2010 and became historic as the first time a civilian judicial order permitted a search in one of the Turkish Armed Forces' most confidential units. According to media reports, the search authorization was granted after consultations between political and military authorities of the time; the documents obtained were secured both by the General Staff and judicial authorities.

== Debate on unlawful surveillance ==
Information in the investigation file and later statements sparked debate regarding the legal nature of the surveillance task assigned to certain special forces personnel. Testimonies indicated that a colonel serving in Ankara had been followed for a long period, and that the surveillance began with a limited number of personnel and later expanded, but that special forces officers did not legally possess authority for technical or physical surveillance, leading to assessments that the activity constituted unlawful surveillance.

== Public allegations and debates ==
After the searches, numerous conspiracy theories circulated among the public. These included allegations that large numbers of state secrets—such as mobilization plans, critical infrastructure targets, and special operations arrangements—had been seized, and that the identities of hundreds of "covert operatives" had been exposed and subsequently killed. These claims were repeatedly raised by retired military officers, journalists, and opposition leaders in various contexts. Public debate focused heavily on whether the assassination allegation against Arınç was genuine and whether the searches amounted to an act of espionage.

== Assessments by military officials ==
The then–Chief of General Staff İlker Başbuğ later stated that he approved the opening of the cosmic room due to the seriousness of the assassination report against Arınç, and that he would make the same decision again under similar circumstances. Başbuğ acknowledged that the searches caused psychological trauma among groups who trusted the Turkish Armed Forces, but argued that the incident was presented in the media and political debates in an exaggerated or distorted manner.

Retired Major General Ahmet Yavuz emphasized in statements after 2019 that the location searched was not the General Staff Headquarters or the Special Forces Command, as often claimed, but the cosmic room of the Ankara Mobilization Regional Directorate. Yavuz stated that allegations of hundreds of people being killed based on information from these rooms lacked concrete evidence, though he still considered the decision to enter the rooms a mistake.

== Judicial personnel and later developments ==
The prosecutors and judges involved in the Cosmic Room search later came back into public focus due to developments in their careers and investigations opened against them. It was reported that the chief prosecutor and several prosecutors involved in the search were later detained and arrested as part of investigations targeting members of the Gülen Movement. The judge who issued the search warrant also became subject to various judicial and administrative inquiries.

== Parliamentary reports and debates ==
The Cosmic Room incident was addressed both in the General Assembly of the TBMM and in various parliamentary commission reports. In the work of the TBMM Coup and Memoranda Investigation Commission and the commission investigating the activities of the Gülen Movement, it was noted that the special warfare/mobilization structure had long remained outside civilian oversight, and that archives of these units might contain critical documents related to past political assassinations and social incidents. The commission reports recommended establishing new investigative commissions to comprehensively examine documents from relevant institutions—including "cosmic rooms"—to shed light on unsolved political murders and dark events.

== Post-2014 process and investigations ==
After political and legal shifts in Turkey post-2014, the course of the Cosmic Room case reversed. During this period, several prosecutors and judicial personnel involved in the searches were charged with crimes such as "obtaining information that must remain secret for the security of the state for political or military espionage", "forgery of official documents", "slander" and "violation of communication privacy". Many defendants were also accused of links to the Gülen Movement.

== Final judicial decision ==
The trial known as the "Cosmic Room plot case" concluded in 2020 with a ruling by the Ankara 2nd High Criminal Court. The court acquitted the defendants of charges such as "obtaining state secrets for political or military espionage", citing a lack of definitive and convincing evidence. However, defendants for whom evidence existed within the scope of Gülen Movement investigations received prison sentences of varying lengths. The reasoned judgment explicitly stated that allegations of state secrets being leaked from the cosmic room were not supported by concrete evidence, demonstrating that the long-standing public perception of espionage was not confirmed at the judicial level.
