= İsmail Hakkı Karadayı =

22nd Chief of the General Staff of the Turkish Armed Forces from 1994 to 1998

22nd Chief of the General Staff of Turkey
- In office 30 August 1994 – 30 August 1998
- President: Suleyman Demirel
- Preceded by: Doğan Güreş
- Succeeded by: Hüseyin Kıvrıkoğlu

Personal details
- Born: 25 April 1932 Çankırı, Turkey
- Died: 26 May 2020 (aged 88) Kadıköy, Istanbul, Turkey
- Education: Turkish Military Academy

Military service
- Allegiance: Turkey
- Branch/service: Turkish Land Forces
- Rank: General

İsmail Hakkı Karadayı (25 April 1932 – 26 May 2020) was a Turkish general, who became the 35th Commander of the Turkish Land Forces on 30 August 1993. He served between 1994 and 1998 as the 22nd Chief of the Turkish General Staff for a four-year term and was succeeded by General Hüseyin Kıvrıkoğlu. On 13 April 2018, a Turkish court sentenced him to life imprisonment for his role in the 1997 Turkish military memorandum. During his General Staff, the Turkish army carried out Operation Steel, Dawn and Hammer against the PKK in Northern Iraq.

== Award and decorations ==
- Turkey: State Medal of Distinguished Service
- Turkey: Turkish Armed Forces Medal of Distinguished Service
- Turkey: Turkish Armed Forces Medal of Honor
- South Korea: Order of National Reunification (Tong Il Jang)
- Pakistan: Nishan-e-Imtiaz (Order of Excellence)
- United States: Legion of Merit, United States (twice)
- Jordan: Order of Merit, First Class
- France: Commander, National Order of the Legion of Honour
- International Melvin Jones Fellowship Award (Lions Clubs International)
- Paul Harris Fellow Award (Rotary International)
- İlter Erkan Friendship and Peace Award
- Honorary Doctorate in Public Administration, Trakya University

Military offices
Preceded by Muhittin Fisunoğlu	Commander of the Turkish Army; 30 August 1993 – 30 August 1994	Succeeded by Mehmet Hikmet Bayar
Preceded by Doğan Güreş	Chief of the General Staff of Turkey; 30 August 1994 – 30 August 1998	Succeeded by Hüseyin Kıvrıkoğlu
