= Yaşar Büyükanıt =

25th chief of the General Staff of the Turkish Armed Forces from 2006 to 2008

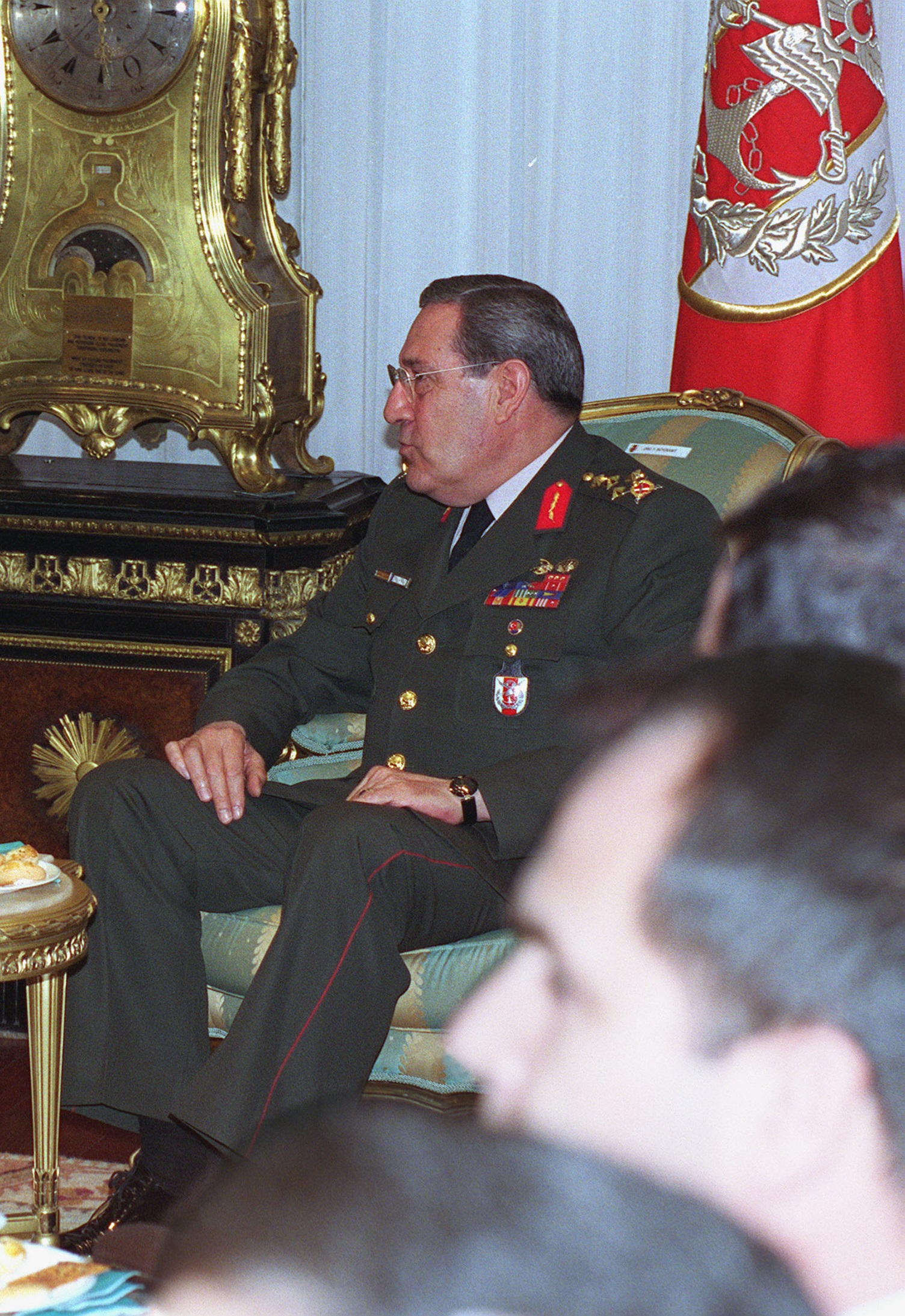
- Büyükanıt in 2001

25th Chief of the General Staff of Turkey
- In office 28 August 2006 – 28 August 2008
- President: Ahmet Necdet Sezer; Abdullah Gül
- Preceded by: Hilmi Özkök
- Succeeded by: İlker Başbuğ

Personal details
- Born: 1 September 1940 Istanbul, Turkey
- Died: 21 November 2019 (aged 79) Istanbul
- Resting place: Karacaahmet Cemetery
- Spouse: Filiz Büyükanıt
- Education: Turkish Military Academy; NATO Defense College

Military service
- Allegiance: Turkey
- Branch/service: Turkish Land Forces
- Years of service: 1961–2008
- Rank: General

General Mehmet Yaşar Büyükanıt (1 September 1940 – 21 November 2019) was the 25th Chief of the Turkish General Staff of the Turkish Armed Forces, from 28 August 2006 to 28 August 2008.

== Biography ==
General Yaşar Büyükanıt was born in Istanbul, Turkey, on 1 September 1940. He joined the Erzincan Military High School in 1959. He graduated from the Turkish Military Academy in 1961 as an infantry officer. After graduating from the Infantry School in 1963, he served in different units of the Turkish Army as a platoon and commando company commander until 1970.

Following his graduation from the Army Staff College in 1972, he served as the Chief of Operations at the 6th Infantry Division. Also, as an instructor at the Army Staff College, as the chief of the Intelligence Division Basic Intelligence Branch Forces and Systems Section at the Supreme Headquarters Allied Powers Europe in Mons, Belgium, as the section and then branch chief of the General-Admiral Branch at the Turkish General Staff (TGS) Headquarters, as the commander of Kuleli Military High School and of the Presidential Guard Regiment.

After graduating from the NATO Defence College, he was promoted to the rank of brigadier general in 1988. He served as the 2nd Armored Brigade Commander and then as the chief of Intelligence Department at AFSOUTH Headquarters in Naples, Italy.

Having been promoted to rank of major general in 1992, General Büyükanıt served as the secretary general of the Turkish General Staff and then as the superintendent of the Turkish Army Academy. He was promoted to the rank of lieutenant general in 1996 and served as the 7th Army Corps Commander until 1998, after which he became the chief of operations of the TGS.

In 2000, he was promoted to the rank of general and served as the deputy chief of TGS until 2003. He later served as the commander of the First Army. General Büyükanıt was appointed as the commander of the Turkish Army in 2004. He assumed the command of the Turkish Armed Forces on 28 August 2006.

Yaşar Büyükanıt was married to Filiz Büyükanıt, with whom he had a daughter, Bengü. She died on 18 November 2019.

Yaşar Büyükanıt died in a hospital, where he was treated, on 21 November 2019, three days after his spouse's death. He was buried at Karacaahmet Cemetery following a memorial ceremony held at the HQ of the First Army and the religious funeral service at Big Selimiye Mosque. He was survived by daughter Bengü Büyükanıt Caymaz.

== Political controversies ==
In a speech at the commencement of the academic year at the Turkish Military Academy on 2 October 2006, which was interpreted as a "harsh salvo" in Turkish media, Büyükanıt expressed support for secular values and outlined a hard stance against the PKK. Büyükanıt also asserted that certain EU and NATO-allied countries have intentionally allowed terrorist organizations acting against Turkey, to base and run operations in their own territories, inconsistent with Turkey's relations and alliance with those countries.

The Turkish military published a statement on 27 April 2007, two days before the second Republic Protest, as the 2007 presidential election was ongoing. This statement, later called the "E-memorandum", warned against Islamic fundamentalism, which was alleged to pose a threat to the secular Republican nature of the Turkish state. Büyükanıt, then Chief of General Staff, said that it was him who wrote this statement but he denied that it was a memorandum.

Later, Büyükanıt held a 2.5 hours long secretive meeting with Prime Minister Recep Tayyip Erdoğan on 5 May 2007 at Dolmabahçe Palace in Istanbul.

== Awards and decorations ==
- Turkey: Turkish Armed Forces Medal of Honor
- Turkey: Turkish Armed Forces Medal of Distinguished Courage and Self-Sacrifice
- Turkey: Turkish Armed Forces Medal of Distinguished Service
- United States: Legion of Merit
- Italy: Medal of Merit
- Pakistan: Medal of Nishan-e-Imtiaz

Military offices
Preceded by Çetin Doğan	Commander of the Turkish First Army; 20 August 2003 – 20 August 2004	Succeeded by Hurşit Tolon
Preceded by Aytaç Yalman	Commander of the Turkish Army; 29 August 2004 – 25 August 2006	Succeeded by İlker Başbuğ
Preceded by Hilmi Özkök	Chief of the General Staff of Turkey; 28 August 2006 – 28 August 2008	Succeeded by İlker Başbuğ
