= Hulusi Akar =

Turkish general and politician (born 1952)

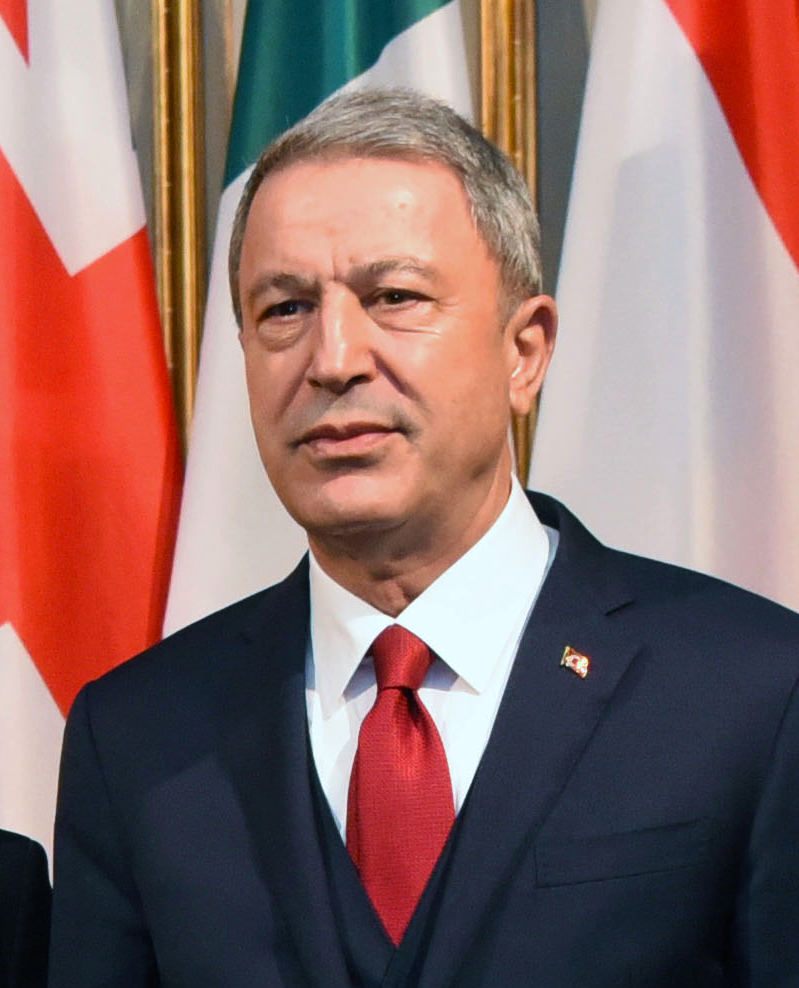
- Akar in 2019

Minister of National Defense
- In office 10 July 2018 – 3 June 2023
- President: Recep Tayyip Erdoğan
- Preceded by: Nurettin Canikli
- Succeeded by: Yaşar Güler

29th Chief of the Turkish General Staff
- In office 18 August 2015 – 10 July 2018
- President: Recep Tayyip Erdoğan
- Preceded by: Necdet Özel
- Succeeded by: Yaşar Güler

Member of the Grand National Assembly
- Incumbent
- Assumed office 2 June 2023
- Constituency: Kayseri (2023)

Personal details
- Born: 12 March 1952 (age 74) Kayseri, Turkey
- Party: Justice and Development Party
- Spouse: Şule Akar
- Children: 2
- Education: Turkish Military Academy; Queen's University Belfast; United States Army Command and General Staff College; Boğaziçi University
- Awards: See below
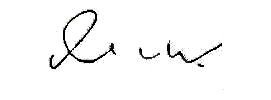
- Signature
- Nickname: Seri Paşa

Military service
- Allegiance: Turkey
- Branch/service: Turkish Land Forces
- Years of service: 1973–2018
- Rank: General
- Commands: Chief of the General Staff; Commander of Land Forces; Deputy Chief of the General Staff; 3rd Land Forces Corps; Land Forces Logistics Command; Land Forces General Staff College Command; Military Academy Command; Chief of Plans and Policy; Internal Security Brigade Command; Chief of Public Information
- Battles/wars: Bosnian War; ISAF Coalition; Kosovo War; Turkey-PKK conflict Turkey-ISIL conflict Operation Shah Euphrates; Operation Euphrates Shield; Operation Olive Branch; Operation Peace Spring

Hulusi Akar (born 12 March 1952) is a retired four-star Turkish Armed Forces general. He previously served as the 29th chief of the Turkish General Staff. Akar also served as a brigade commander in various NATO engagements including the International Security Assistance Force against the Taliban insurgency, Operation Deliberate Force during the Bosnian War, the Kosovo Force during the Kosovo War, as well as overseeing much of the Turkish involvement in the Syrian Civil War.

During the 2016 coup attempt he was taken hostage by his own soldiers at Ankara headquarters and then was flown to Akıncı Air Base. On 9 July, 2018, he became the first active military duty officer in modern Turkey's history to be appointed as defense minister, serving until 3 June, 2023.

In the 2023 Turkish parliamentary election he was elected to the Grand National Assembly of Turkey from Kayseri representing the Justice and Development Party. As of October 2026, he is the AK Party member of parliament for Kayseri and Chairman of the Turkish Parliament's National Defense Commission.

== Early life and education ==
Akar was born in 1952 in Kayseri, Turkey. He graduated from the Turkish Military Academy in 1972 and the Turkish Infantry School in 1973. In 1975, he attended Queen's University Belfast for postgraduate studies in International Diplomacy. He graduated from the Army Command and Staff College in 1982, from the Armed Forces College in 1985 and from the United States Army Command and General Staff College in 1987.

He attended academic programs in Computer Programming at Middle East Technical University and International Relations at Ankara University, Faculty of Political Sciences, and completed his doctorate at Boğaziçi University. His doctoral thesis, which included the political and military developments in 1919 on the Turkish-American relations to the fore through American archive documents, was published as a book by the Turkish Historical Society under the title of "Harbord Military Mission Report: Studies an American Fact-Finding Mission Conducted and Their Impacts on Turkish-American Relations".

== Military career ==
Akar served as a company commander, section chief and branch chief at various units and headquarters including the Turkish General Staff. He also served as an instructor at the Army Command and Staff College and was posted abroad as a staff officer in the intelligence division at Allied Forces Southern Europe (AFSOUTH) from 1990–1993. From 1993 until 1994, he was the Military Assistant to the Land Forces Commander, and also served as the Chief Public Information Officer. Later on, he continued this assignment for the Commander of the Turkish Armed Forces from 1994–1997. He was subsequently posted as the Commander of the Turkish Brigade in Zenica, Bosnia from 1997 until 1998.

Upon his promotion to brigadier general in 1998, he commanded the Internal Security Brigade for two years, and then served as the Chief of Plans and Policy in AFSOUTH from 2000–2002. Following his promotion to major general in 2002, he assumed the command of the Military Academy for three years and was subsequently the Commander of the Army Command and Staff College for two years until 2007.

After his promotion to lieutenant general, he was the commander of Land Forces Logistics and then the Commander of the NATO Rapid Deployable Corps-Turkey (NRDC-T) and the 3rd Corps from 2009–2011. Subsequent to his promotion to the rank of general in 2011, he served as the Deputy Chief of the Turkish General Staff from 2011 until 2013, and the Commander of the Turkish Land Forces from 2013 until 2015.

=== Uludere (Roboski) incident ===
On 28 December 2011, Turkish air force F-16s bombed a group of Kurdish villagers near the Iraqi border, killing 34 people among them 17 children. They were mistakenly identified as PKK militants and Akar at high command ordered the strike. The investigation was transferred from the civilian prosecutor to the military one who concluded in 2014 that the military personnel had committed an unavoidable error but should not be prosecuted. The victim families appealed to Turkish Constitutional Court that rejected them on procedural ground. The European Court of Human Rights declared their application inadmissible for procedural reasons.

On 2 August 2015, General Akar was appointed as the 29th chief of the General Staff and took up the position on 18 August 2015.

=== Chief of General Staff ===
Akar was taken hostage on 15 July 2016 during the Turkish Armed Forces' 2016 attempted coup d'état against the Turkish government, by those responsible for leading the attempted coup. According to The Economist, Akar "was told by his aides to sign a declaration of martial law (sıkıyönetim). When he refused, they tightened a belt around his neck, but he would not yield." He was held hostage at Akıncı Air Base (now Mürted Airfield Command) in Ankara before pro-government forces retook control of the air base and rescued him in the early hours of 16 July 2016.

The rescue was announced at 02:45 EEST on 16 July 2016 by Anadolu Agency, although CNN Türk placed the time of rescue attempt around 07:45 EEST. First Army commander General Ümit Dündar served as Acting Chief of General Staff during Akar's capture. After his release he testified that one of his captors offered to put him on the phone with alleged coup figurehead Fethullah Gülen.

In 2016, Akar led Operation Euphrates Shield, the Turkish military intervention in Syria against the jihadist group ISIL, the Syrian Democratic Forces, and various other armed militant-Kurdish groups (the SDF and other armed militant-Kurdish groups are also fighting ISIL).

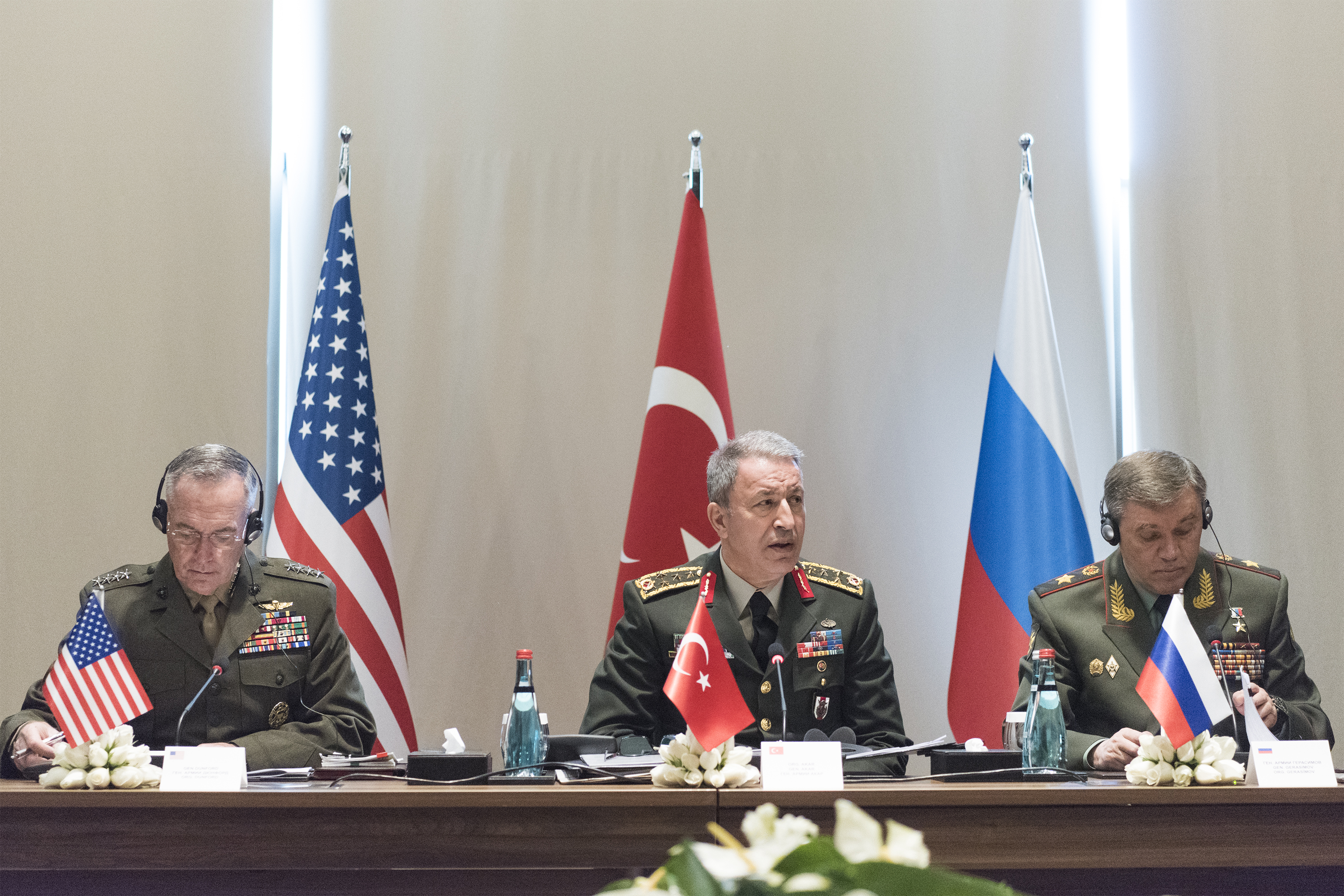
Dunford, Hulusi Akar and Valery Gerasimov are discussing their nations' operations in northern Syria, March 2017

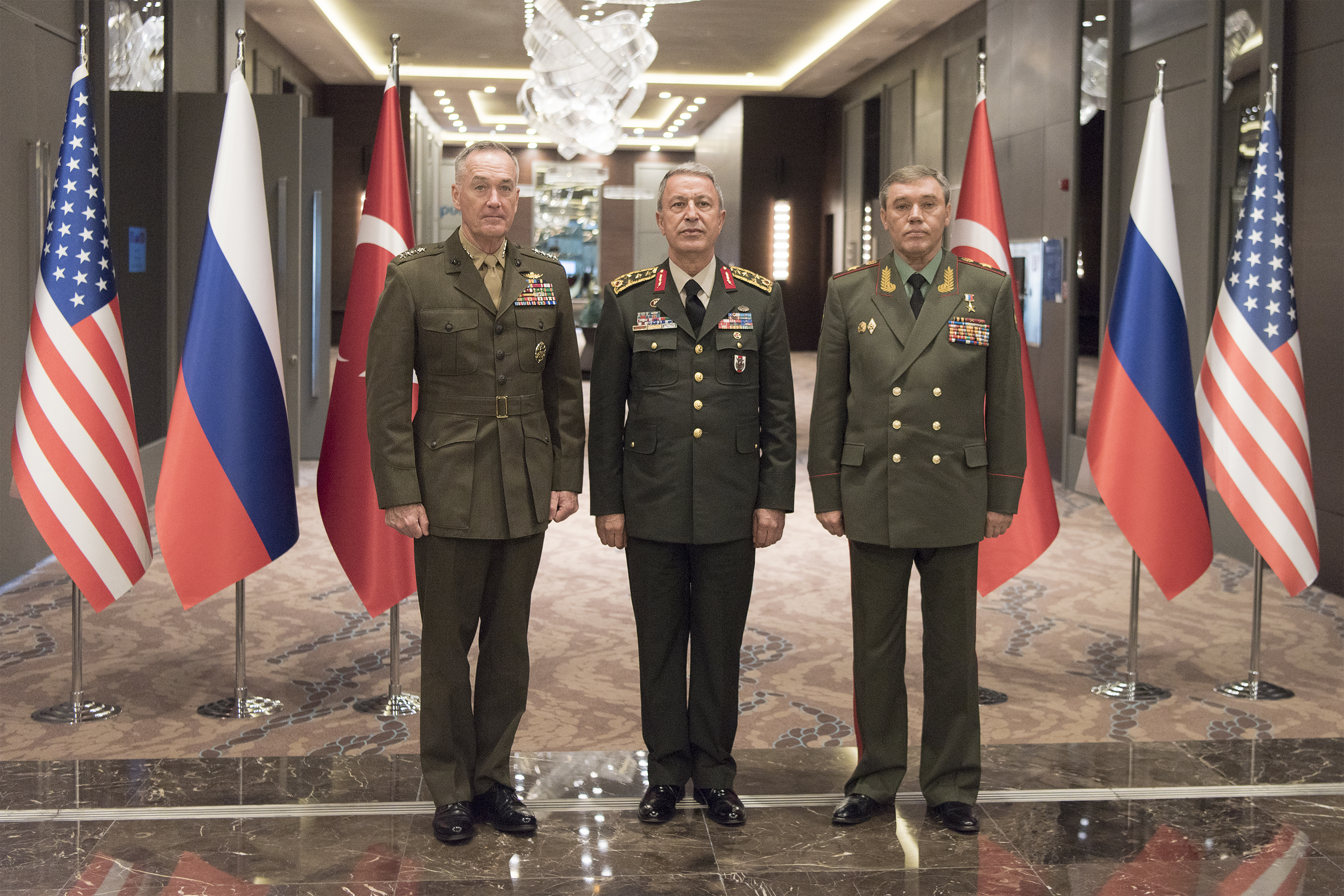
Gerasimov (right), Joseph Dunford (left) and Hulusi Akar (middle) at a meeting to discuss their nations’ operations in northern Syria, 6 March 2017

== Defense minister ==
On 9 July 2018, president Erdogan named Akar defense minister; ''Defense News'' described it as the first time a civilian government in Turkey had picked an active duty military commander for the post.

=== Syria and northern Iraq ===
Akar was the ministry's public voice during Operation Peace Spring, launched 9 October, 2019 against the Syrian Democratic Forces in northeastern Syria. He described the operation as directed at terrorist rather than an invasion, said that the 120-hour pause agreed in October was not a ceasefire and rejected foreign media reports that Turkey is using chemical weapons. Several countries condemned the operation. After an airstrike on in Idlib on 27 February 2020 killed at least 34 Turkish soldiers, Akar announced on 1 March the start of Operation Spring Shield against Syrian government forces and said that more than 2000 of its personnel had been "neutralised". He added that Turkey does not wish a confrontation with Russia and a Turkish-Russian agreement that was signed on 5 March haulted the escalation. During Turkey's operation against the PKK in northern Iraq he visited a Turkish military base there in 2021, and Turkey launched Operation Claw-Lock on 17 April 2022. In November 2021 during a parliamentary exchange with MPs Tülay Hatimoğulları Oruç and Garo Paylan over alleged chemical weapons use in northern Iraq, Akar denied that a "Kurdistan" exists in Turkey or Iraq.

=== Azerbaijan ===
In July 2020, after clashes on the Armenia-Azerbaijan border, Akar condemned Armenia and said Turkey would keep supporting Azerbaijan's armed forces under the principal of "one nation, two states". When fighting in the Second Nagorno-Karabakh War escalated on 28 September 2020, he called on Armenia to halt its attacks and withdraw its forces, Armenia accused Turkey of direct military involvement, which Azerbaijan denied. After the clash he said Turkish military technology and contributed to Azerbaijan's success.

=== United States and NATO ===
Akar supported Turkey's purchase of Russian S-400 missile system. After deliveries began in July 2019 and US announced Turkey's removal from the F-35 programme, and on 14 December 2020 it sanctioned Turkey's Presidency of Defense Industries under CAATSA, the first use of the fact against a NATO member. Akar condemned the sanctions. In June 2021, ahead of the NATO withdrawal from Afghanistan, Akar said Turkey will continue to operate Hamid Karzai International Airport if allies provided political, financial, and logistic support. Critics saw the offer as part of an effort to repair ties with the US. On 17 June 2022, he said Turkey supports NATO enlargement but opposed Finland and Sweden joining accusing them of supporting terrorism.

=== Ukraine war and the Black Sea ===
After Russia's 2022 invasion to Ukraine, Akar met his Russian and Ukrainian counterparts, Sergei Shoigu and Oleksii Reznikov. On 22 July 2022 he signed the Black Sea Grain Initiative in Istanbul on Turkey's behalf alongside Shoigu, Ukrainian infrastructure minister Oleksandr Kubrakov and UN Secretary-General António Guterres. The deal established a joint coordination centre in Istanbul to monitor shipments, and it weas renewed after its third term expired on 17 July, 2023.

=== Greece and the Eastern Mediterranean ===
During the 2020 standoff over the research vessel Oruç Reis, Akar said Turkey could not abandon its rights in the area and accused Greece of violating international agreements by arming 18 Aegean islands. Greece's defense minister said demilitarisation was out of the question while the Turkish threat persisted, and Akar repeated the demand in April 2022, citing the Treaty of Lausanne.

=== 2023 earthquakes ===
After the 6 February 2023 earthquakes, Akar said the armed forces were fully mobilised, reporting 1,600 soldiers were deployed within a day and more than 40,000 personnel by late February. He rejected the criticism that the military's deployment was late and, when pressed on the army's limited role compared with 1999, asked who would guard the borders and Turkey's positions in Syria and Iraq. A ''Middle East Eye'' investigation found the military response varied across the region and was hampered by technical problems, and that the military was not one of the main teams in the national disaster response plan.

== Member of parliament ==
In the 2023 Turkish parliamentary election, Akar was elected to the Grand National Assembly of Turkey for the Justice and Development Party from Kayseri. On 14 June 2023, he was elected chair of the assembly's National Defense Committee (''Millî Savunma Komisyonu''). He remained in the post into 2026. In his capacity he has met foreign officials In February 2024 he visited Northern Cyprus and met its foreign minister Tahsin Ertuğruloğlu, with the TRNC foreign ministry stating that the meeting stressed cooperation and a two-state solution.

In May 2024 he addressed the first meeting of defense committee chairs of TURKPA member parliaments, hosted in Ankara. He was received by Azerbaijani president Ilham Aliyev in February 2025 and by Northern Cypriot president Tufan Erhürman in March 2026.

== Awards and decorations ==
Akar has been awarded the:

- Turkey: TAF Medal of Distinguished Service
- Turkey: TAF Medal of Distinguished Courage and Self-Sacrifice
- Turkey: TAF Medal of Distinguished Courage and Self-Sacrifice
- Turkey: TAF Medal of Honor
- Pakistan: Nishan-e-Imtiaz
- United States of America: Legion of Merit
- South Korea: Order of National Security Merit of South Korea
- Azerbaijan: Distinguished Service in Military Cooperation Medal
- Kazakhstan: 20th Anniversary Medal of the Armed Forces of Kazakhstan
- Kyrgyzstan: Chief of Staff Distinguished Service Medal

== Personal life ==
Akar is married to Şule, with whom he has two children. In addition to Turkish, he is also fluent in English and Italian.

== See also ==
- List of ministers of national defense of Turkey

Military offices
Preceded by Hayri Kıvrıkoğlu	Commander of the Turkish Army; 23 August 2013 – 18 August 2015	Succeeded by Salih Zeki Çolak
Preceded by Necdet Özel	Chief of the General Staff of Turkey; 18 August 2015 – 10 July 2018	Succeeded by Yaşar Güler
Political offices
Preceded by İsmet Yılmaz	Minister of National Defence; 10 July 2018–3 June 2023	Succeeded by Yaşar Güler
