= Hilmi Özkök =

24th Chief of the General Staff of the Turkish Armed Forces from 2002 to 2006

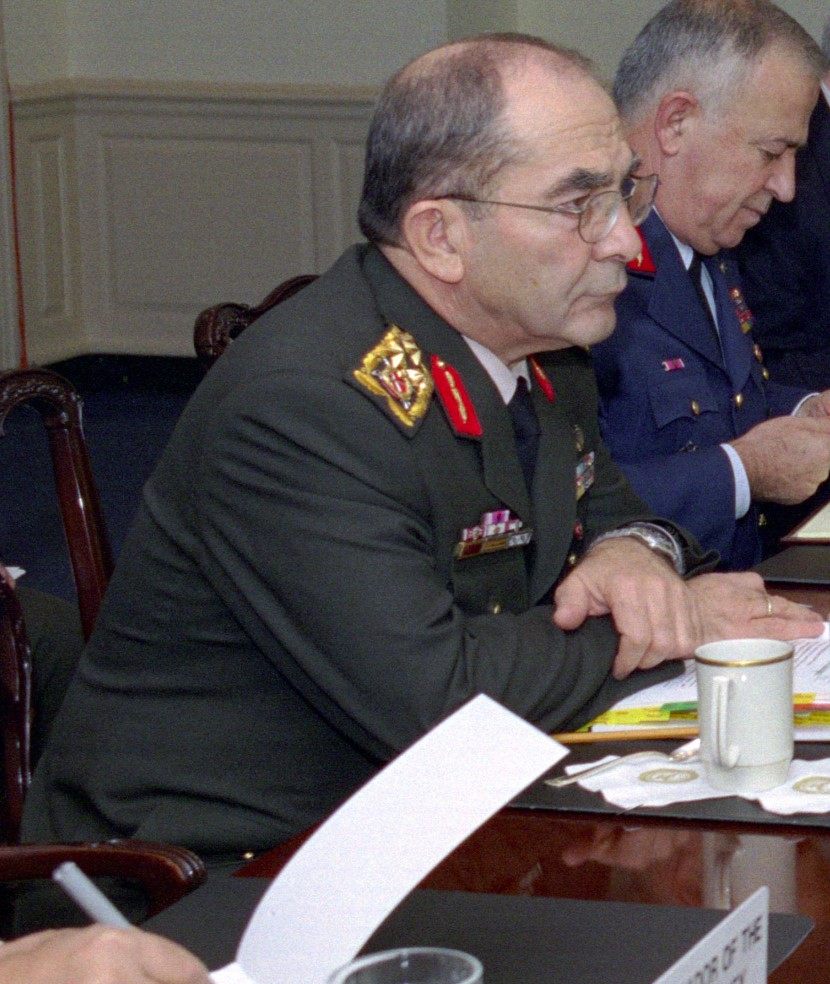

24th Chief of the General Staff of Turkey
- In office 28 August 2002 – 30 August 2006
- President: Ahmet Necdet Sezer
- Preceded by: Hüseyin Kıvrıkoğlu
- Succeeded by: Yaşar Büyükanıt

Personal details
- Born: August 4, 1940 (age 86) Turgutlu, Turkey
- Spouse: Özenç Özkök
- Children: 2
- Education: Turkish Military Academy; NATO Defense College
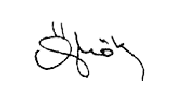
- Signature

Military service
- Allegiance: Turkey
- Branch/service: Turkish Land Forces
- Years of service: 1959–2006
- Rank: General

General Hilmi Özkök (born 4 August 1940) is a Turkish general who served as the 24th Chief of the General Staff of the Turkish Armed Forces. He took up that post on August 28, 2002, and served until August 30, 2006, when he retired and was succeeded by General Yaşar Büyükanıt.

Özkök has expressed support for Turkey's alignment with the European Union, sought a reduced role for the National Security Council, and opposed his peers' plans to stage a coup.

== Education and personal life ==
Hilmi Özkök was born in Turgutlu, Manisa Province, and has been a career soldier. He was educated at the Işıklar Military High School in Bursa and went from there in 1957 to complete a two-year course at the Turkish Military Academy. Özkök left there as a second lieutenant in the Artillery. He has commanded an Artillery Gun Line, Forward Observation team, Fire Direction Center, SATA Battery, Battalion and Brigade. He has mostly worked with M114 155 mm howitzers and M198 howitzers. He has commanded a Brigade which included a MGM-140 ATACMS tactical ballistic missile battalion. He studied at the Army War College and the NATO Defense College in the 1970s.

He is married to Özenç Özkök and has two children.

In his retirement he is pursuing photography and poetry.

== Career ==
After graduating from the Army War College in 1972, Özkök moved into military staff, initially with the Special Weapons Branch of the Allied Forces Southern Europe (AFSOUTH), and then at SHAPE. He was promoted to brigadier general in 1984 and worked as Chief of Planning and Operations for the General Staff (TGS). From 1986 to 1988 he commanded the 70th Infantry Brigade and on his promotion to major general in 1988 he commanded the 28th Infantry Division. He returned to the TGS in 1990 and was promoted to lieutenant general in 1992 when he was sent to Brussels to head the Turkish NATO Military Delegation for three years.

On August 30, 1996, Özkök was promoted to full general and took charge of the NATO Allied Land Forces South-Eastern Europe (LANDSOUTHEAST) located in İzmir. He returned again to the TGS in 1998, this time as deputy chief. After a brief stint as the commander of the First Army in Istanbul, he was made commander of the Turkish Army in 2002, succeeding Hüseyin Kıvrıkoğlu. He served as chairman until his retirement on August 30, 2006.

The Chronicle said that during his tenure as the chairman of the Joint Chiefs of Staff, he opposed the plans of some of his peers who wanted to stage another coup d'etat and narrowly evaded assassination with a tip-off from the CIA on 3 February 2004. Major general Fehmi Büyükbayram of the Ankara central garrison changed Özkök's schedule in order to protect him. Another attempt was allegedly prevented with a tip-off from the United Kingdom. Özkök recognized the allegations made in the Chronicle, but rejected some of the others, saying that the military would have taken the necessary precautions had they been true. In a 2007, interview Özkök said that he did not eat from the army canteen. People inferred that he feared poisoning, but Özkök replied that he merely wanted healthier food. A common complaint against him by his former colleagues has been that he often seems to avoid alcohol, as an admiral in Turkish navy wrote in his personal diary "what we found in his (Özkök) glass turned out to be Coca-Cola while he was pretending to be drinking."

== Awards and decorations ==
- Turkey: State Medal of Distinguished Service
- Turkey: Turkish Armed Forces Medal of Honor
- Turkey: Turkish Armed Forces Medal of Distinguished Service
- Turkey: Turkish Armed Forces Medal of Distinguished Courage and Self-Sacrifice
- United States: Legion Of Merit
- Albania: Golden Decoration of the Eagle
- Pakistan: Medal of Nishan-I Imtiaz
- Spain: Great Cross for Military Merit
- France: Medal of Merit
- South Korea: Tong-Il Medal

Military offices
Preceded by Çevik Bir	Commander of the Turkish First Army; August 20, 1999 – August 21, 2000	Succeeded by Necdet Yılmaz Timur
Preceded by Atilla Ateş	Commander of the Turkish Army; August 27, 2000 – August 29, 2002	Succeeded by Aytaç Yalman
Preceded by Hüseyin Kıvrıkoğlu	Chief of the General Staff of Turkey; Agu 28, 2002–Agu 28, 2006	Succeeded by Yaşar Büyükanıt
