= List of commanders of the Turkish Land Forces =

Commander of the Turkish Land Forces
- Türk Kara Kuvvetleri Komutanlığı
- Flag of Turkish Land Forces Command

- Incumbent; General Metin Tokel since 5 August 2025
- Ministry of National Defense; Turkish Land Forces
- Member of: National Security Council; Supreme Military Council
- Reports to: Minister of National Defense
- Nominator: President
- Appointer: President
- Formation: 1 July 1949
- First holder: Nuri Yamut
- Website: www.kkk.tsk.tr

This list includes commanders of the Turkish Land Forces (Turkish: Türk Kara Kuvvetleri Komutanlığı), who were, in their time of service, nominal heads of the Turkish Land Forces (or Turkish Army).

The current Commander of the Turkish Land Forces is General Metin Tokel, since 5 August 2025.

No.	Commander	Picture	Took office	Left office
1	General Nuri Yamut		1 July 1949	5 June 1950
2	General Kurtcebe Noyan		6 June 1950	7 May 1951
3	General Şükrü Kanatlı		28 December 1951	15 January 1954
4	General Nurettin Baransel		6 April 1954	28 May 1954
5	General Abdülkadir Seven		10 July 1954	25 April 1955
6	General Hakkı Tunaboylu		13 September 1955	6 June 1956
7	General Ahmet Nurettin Aknoz		25 June 1956	16 September 1957
8	General İbrahim Necati Tacan		30 November 1957	28 July 1958
9	General Rüştü Erdelhun		1 August 1958	21 August 1958
10	General Cemal Gürsel		21 August 1958	2 June 1960
11	General Cevdet Sunay		3 June 1960	2 August 1960
12	General Mehmet Muzaffer Alankuş		4 August 1960	6 January 1961
13	Lieutenant general Celal Alkoç		6 March 1961	26 June 1961
14	General Muhittin Önür		31 August 1961	23 February 1962
15	General Mehmet Ali Keskiner		23 February 1962	28 August 1964
16	General Cemal Tural		28 August 1964	15 March 1966
17	General Ahmet Refik Yılmaz		21 March 1966	23 August 1968
18	General Memduh Tağmaç		23 August 1968	16 March 1969
19	General Fikret Esen		18 March 1969	28 August 1969
20	General Nazmi Karakoç		28 August 1969	28 August 1970
21	General Faruk Gürler		28 August 1970	28 August 1972
22	General Semih Sancar		28 August 1972	7 March 1973
23	General Eşref Akıncı		7 March 1973	1 April 1976
24	General Namık Kemal Ersun		29 March 1976	1 June 1977
25	General Semih Sancar		1 June 1977	4 September 1977
26	General Kenan Evren		5 September 1977	6 March 1978
27	General Nurettin Ersin		9 March 1978	1 July 1983
28	General Necdet Üruğ		1 July 1983	6 December 1983
29	General Haydar Saltık		6 December 1983	12 August 1985
30	General Necdet Öztorun		12 August 1985	2 July 1987
31	General Necip Torumtay		2 July 1987	24 July 1987
32	General Kemal Yamak		24 July 1987	23 August 1989
33	General Doğan Güreş		23 August 1989	6 December 1990
34	General Muhittin Fisunoğlu		1 January 1991	30 August 1993
35	General İsmail Hakkı Karadayı		30 August 1993	30 August 1994
36	General Hikmet Bayar		30 August 1994	27 August 1996
37	General Hikmet Köksal		27 August 1996	28 August 1997
38	General Hüseyin Kıvrıkoğlu		28 August 1997	27 August 1998
39	General Atilla Ateş		27 August 1998	25 August 2000
40	General Hilmi Özkök		27 August 2000	29 August 2002
41	General Aytaç Yalman		27 August 2002	29 August 2004
42	General Yaşar Büyükanıt		29 August 2004	25 August 2006
43	General İlker Başbuğ		25 August 2006	27 August 2008
44	General Işık Koşaner		27 August 2008	27 August 2010
45	General Erdal Ceylanoğlu		27 August 2010	29 July 2011
46	General Necdet Özel		29 July 2011	4 August 2011
47	General Hayri Kıvrıkoğlu		4 August 2011	23 August 2013
48	General Hulusi Akar		23 August 2013	17 August 2015
49	General Salih Zeki Çolak		17 August 2015	23 August 2017
50	General Yaşar Güler		23 August 2017	10 July 2018
51	General Ümit Dündar		10 July 2018	13 August 2021
52	General Musa Avsever		13 August 2021	3 August 2023
53	General Selçuk Bayraktaroğlu		3 August 2023	5 August 2025
54	General Metin Tokel		5 August 2025	Incumbent

== See also ==
- Chief of the Turkish General Staff
- List of commanders of the Turkish Air Force
- List of commanders of the Turkish Naval Forces
- List of general commanders of the Turkish Gendarmerie
- List of commandants of the Turkish Coast Guard
- List of commanders of the First Army of Turkey
- List of commanders of the Second Army of Turkey
- List of commanders of the Third Army of Turkey
- List of commanders of the Aegean Army

== Sources ==
- Harp Akademileri Komutanlığı, Harp Akademilerinin 120 Yılı, İstanbul, 1968. (in Turkish)
