= Operation Shah Euphrates =

Turkish military operation

- Part of Foreign Involvement in the Syrian Civil War, Turkey–ISIL conflict and Turkish military intervention in Syria
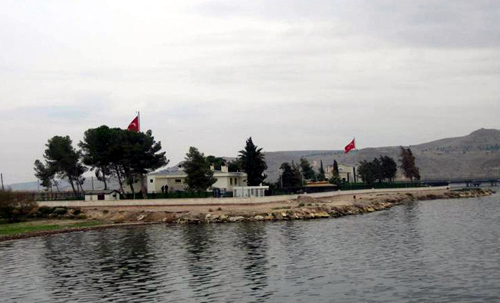
- View of the Tomb of Suleyman Shah (1973-2015)
- Location: Aleppo Governorate, Syria; 36°N 38°E
- Commanded by: (Turkey) Gen. Necdet Özel
- Date: 22 February 2015
- Executed by: Turkey; People's Protection Units
- Outcome: Tomb of Süleyman Shah was transferred; Turkish soldiers were evacuated
- Casualties: 1 soldier (non-combat)

Operation Shah Euphrates (Turkish: Şah Fırat Operasyonu) was an operation by the Turkish military to relocate the tomb of Suleyman Shah in Syria conducted on 21/22 February 2015. The tomb, which was positioned inside Turkey's only foreign enclave, had been surrounded by self-proclaimed Islamic State of Iraq and Syria (ISIS) forces for over 4 months. Due to the presence of ISIS, the exclave's garrison had recently been raised from 11 Turkish soldiers to 38.

== Operation ==
On the night of 21–22 February 2015, a Turkish military convoy including 600 Turkish troops, tanks and other armored vehicles numbering about 100 entered Syria to evacuate the tomb's 38 guards and relocate the remains. The operation was conducted through the border crossing of Kobani. According to Hasip Kaplan of the Peoples' Democratic Party (HDP), the Kurdish People's Defense Units (YPG) supported the transfer.

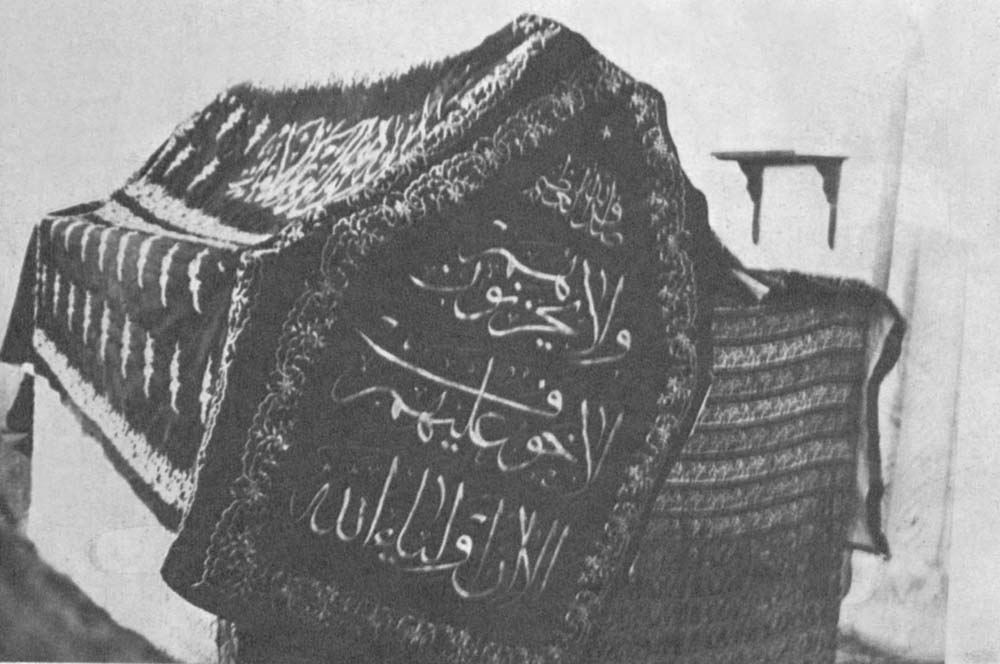
The tomb in 1921.

Different locations of Süleyman's tomb

== Reactions ==
Despite Interior Minister Efkan Ala was denying reports that the Turkish army had to flee from ISIS militants the party leaders of the Republican People's Party (CHP) and the Nationalist Movement Party (MHP), Kemal Kılıçdaroğlu and Devlet Bahçeli both condemned the fact that Turkish soldiers retreated from the tomb. The retreat from an exclave from Turkish sovereign territory was seen as a defeat. The tomb complex was destroyed to prevent its use by ISIS.

=== New location ===
The tomb was rebuilt in Turkish-controlled territory 200 meters inside Syria, 22 km (14 mi) west of Kobani and 5 km (3.1 mi) east of the Euphrates, less than 2 km (1.2 mi) southeast of the Turkish village of Esmesi (Esmeler or Esme or Eshme) at the southern extremity of Birecik District. Turkish Prime Minister Ahmet Davutoğlu said that a new tomb would later be built in Syrian territory.
