= İlker Başbuğ =

26th Chief of the General Staff of the Turkish Armed Forces from 2008 to 2010

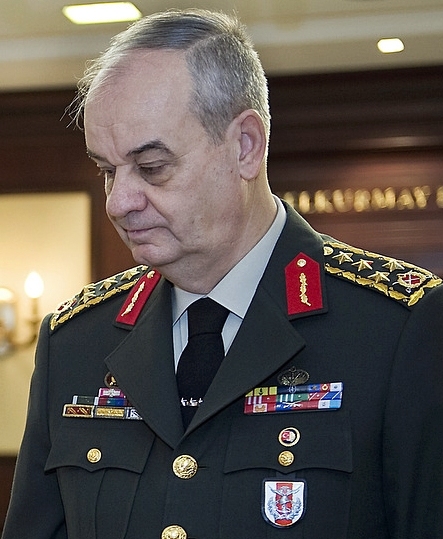

26th Chief of the General Staff of Turkey
- In office 28 August 2008 – 27 August 2010
- President: Abdullah Gül
- Preceded by: Yaşar Büyükanıt
- Succeeded by: Işık Koşaner

Personal details
- Born: 29 April 1943 (age 83) Afyonkarahisar, Turkey
- Spouse: Sevil Başbuğ
- Children: 2
- Education: Turkish Military Academy; Joint Services Command and Staff College; NATO Defense College
- Website: www.ilkerbasbug.com

Military service
- Allegiance: Turkey
- Branch/service: Turkish Land Forces
- Years of service: 1963–2010
- Rank: General
- Commands: Chief of the General Staff

Mehmet İlker Başbuğ (Turkish: [ˈilceɾ ˈbaʃbuː]; born 29 April 1943) is a Turkish former general who served as the 26th Chief of the General Staff of Turkey. He was charged with contravention of Articles 309, 310, and 311 of the Turkish Penal Code. In August 2013, he was convicted on charges of "establishing and leading a terrorist organization" and "attempting to destroy the Turkish government or attempting to partially or completely prevent its functioning" and sentenced to life imprisonment as part of the Ergenekon trials. However, the Constitutional Court of Turkey determined that Başbuğ's legal rights were violated and overturned his conviction; he was released on 7 March 2014.

== Biography ==
İlker Başbuğ was born in Afyonkarahisar, a city in western Turkey, in 1943. He graduated from the Turkish Military Academy in 1962 and the Infantry School in 1963.

He served as Platoon Leader and Company Commander in various units subordinate to the Turkish Land Forces until 1971. Having graduated from the War College as staff officer in 1973, he held a wide variety of command and staff positions as staff officer at Plans and Operations Department at Turkish General Staff, Lecturer at the Army War College, Action Officer at the Intelligence Department at NATO Headquarters in Brussels,Belgium, Chief of Defense Research Branch of Plans and Policy Department at Turkish Land Forces Headquarters and as the commander of the 247th Infantry Regiment, 51st Division.

Before being promoted to brigadier general in 1989, he had completed his education at the Joint Services Command and Staff College in United Kingdom and NATO Defense College. In this rank, he served as the Chief of Logistics and Infrastructure Department at the Supreme Headquarters Allied Powers Europe (SHAPE) in Mons, Belgium and as the commander of the 1st Armored Brigade in Istanbul. He was promoted to major general in 1993. As major general, he served as the deputy commander in Gendarmerie Security Command in Diyarbakır, Turkey and then as the Turkish National Military Representative (NMR) at SHAPE and was promoted to lieutenant general in 1996. In this rank, he served as the Commander of 2nd Corps and as the Deputy of the Secretary General of the National Security Council of the Republic of Turkey, respectively.

In 2002, he was promoted to the rank of general. As General, he held a variety of positions such as the Chief of Staff of the Turkish Land Forces, the Deputy Chief of the Turkish General Staff, the Commander of the First Army, and the Commander of the Turkish Land Forces. He was appointed as commander of the Turkish Armed Forces on 30 August 2008 and served until 27 August 2010.

== Internet Memorandum case ==
17 months after retiring, on 2 January 2012 an investigation started for Başbuğ in the Internet Memorandum case in which he was expected to appear as a witness. In just four days, on 6 January 2012, he was arrested on terror charges after giving his testimony.

Başbuğ made a statement after the court ordered his arrest, saying, "The 26th chief of the General Staff of the Turkish Republic has been arrested on charges of forming and leading a terrorist organization. The judgment rests with the Turkish people." Başbuğ denied all accusations in his defense and said it was "tragicomic" that the chief one of the world's most powerful armies had been accused of leading a terrorist organization.

To accuse the former Chief of the General Staff of being a "terrorist" appears to be an exercise in “reductio ad absurdum,” because it means a "terrorist" – with access to the most secret and sacred of state intelligence – was running the Turkish military. Even Eric Edelman, former U.S. Ambassador to Turkey (2003–2005), was "flabbergasted".

According to Gareth Jenkins, "For many, the arrest of Başbuğ on terrorist charges will be regarded not so much as demonstrating that the General staff is no longer untouchable but that the Gülen movement has the power to imprison whoever it likes, regardless of the law, due process or the absurdity of the allegations; and further proof that in today's Turkey it is not the military but the Gülen Movement that people need to fear."

Prime Minister Recep Tayyip Erdoğan, on a TV program on 5 August 2012, said Başbuğ should be tried without imprisonment, and that he has never believed the charges directed against Başbuğ: "I have never found the charges directed against İlker Pasha correct. I think claims that he is a member of a terrorist organization are very ugly."

In the European Commission's "Turkey 2012 Progress Report", Başbuğ's detention was mentioned twice and it was reported that "concerns persisted over the rights of the defence, lengthy pre-trial detention and excessively long and catch-all indictments, leading to significantly enhanced public scrutiny of the legitimacy of these trials." ("Democracy and the rule of law". Turkey 2012 Progress Report (PDF) (Report). European Commission. 10 October 2012. p. 7.)

On 5 August 2013, Başbuğ was sentenced to life imprisonment on charges of "establishing and leading a terrorist organization" and "attempting to destroy the Turkish government or to attempting to partially or completely prevent its functioning."

After being sentenced to life imprisonment, Başbuğ made a statement saying "If in a country, people question the independence of judges, suspect whether the judgements given are in accordance with the Constitution and the law, then one can not claim that there is supremacy of law in that country. For those who have been tried under these circumstances, the final say is the people’s say. And the people are never wrong and are never deceived. Those who have always stood beside the right and righteous people, beside justice, have a clear conscience. I am one of those people."

According to a research by Gezici Research Company, 67.8% of people find the verdict given to Başbuğ was wrong.

=== Overturning of conviction ===
On 6 March 2014, the Constitutional Court of Turkey overturned Başbuğ's conviction and ordered his release, ruling in favor of a complaint filed by Başbuğ on the grounds that his legal rights had been violated. The next day, on 7 March, the Istanbul 20th Heavy Penal Court complied with the supreme court's decision and overturned Başbuğ's conviction. He was released to cheering crowds later that day, with President Abdullah Gül saying that he considered the overturning of Başbuğ's conviction "a very precious decision" and Deputy Prime Minister Bülent Arınç echoing his sentiments.

On 3 May 2016, The Supreme Court of Appeals overturned all of the local court's verdicts and convictions. The court also determined that Başbuğ's situation should be handled by the Supreme Council.

== Personal life ==
İlker Başbuğ is married to Sevil Başbuğ with two children. He speaks English. In an interview he gave in 2020 after his retirement, he said that his greatest wish in life was the unification of Turkey and Azerbaijan.

After retirement, he wrote a book titled The End of Terrorist Organizations. He completed his second book The Greatest Leader of the 20th Century: Mustafa Kemal, covering the period between 1881 and 1923, in prison. The book became the bestseller in Turkey during the month it was published. His third book, The Greatest Leader of the 20th Century: Atatürk and covering the period between 1923 and 1938, was intended as a continuation of his previous work and was published in November 2012. Başbuğ continued writing: Truths Against Accusations (2014, Kaynak Publications), What Kind of Turkey (2015, Kaynak Publications), Armenian Accusations and the Truths (2015, Remzi Bookstore) and Forgotten Island Cyprus (2016, Kırmızı Kedi).

== Awards and decorations ==
- Turkey: Turkish Armed Forces Medal of Distinguished Courage and Self-Sacrifice
- Turkey: Turkish Armed Forces Medal of Distinguished Service
- Turkey: Turkish Armed Forces Medal of Honor
- Pakistan: Nishan-e-Imtiaz
- Albania: Golden Medal of the Eagle, awarded by President Bamir Topi on 19 June 2009

== See also ==
- List of chiefs of the Turkish General Staff

== Footnotes ==
Military offices
Preceded by Hurşit Tolon	Commander of the Turkish First Army; 19 August 2005 – 17 August 2006	Succeeded by Fethi Remzi Tuncel
Preceded by Yaşar Büyükanıt	Commander of the Turkish Land Forces; 30 August 2006 – 28 August 2008	Succeeded by Işık Koşaner
Preceded by Yaşar Büyükanıt	Chief of the General Staff of Turkey; 28 August 2008 – 27 August 2010	Succeeded by Işık Koşaner
