= Hüseyin Kıvrıkoğlu =

23rd Chief of the General Staff of the Turkish Armed Forces from 1998 to 2002

23rd Chief of the General Staff of Turkey
- In office August 30, 1998 – August 28, 2002
- President: Süleyman Demirel; Ahmet Necdet Sezer
- Preceded by: İsmail Hakkı Karadayı
- Succeeded by: Hilmi Özkök

Personal details
- Born: 1934 (age 91–92) Bozüyük, Bilecik, Turkey
- Education: Turkish Military Academy; NATO Defense College
- Awards: See below

Military service
- Allegiance: Turkey
- Branch/service: Turkish Land Forces
- Years of service: 1957–2002
- Rank: General

Hüseyin Kıvrıkoğlu (born Hüseyin Kıvrık, 1934) is a retired Turkish general who was the 23rd commander of the Turkish Armed Forces and on August 30, 1998, became Chief of the Turkish General Staff for a four-year term.

== Early life and education ==
Born in Bozüyük, Bilecik, Turkey, in December 1934, he completed his secondary schooling at the Işıklar Military High School in Bursa. He graduated from the Turkish Military Academy in 1955 as an artillery officer.

== Military career ==
Upon commissioning, Kıvrıkoğlu underwent his officer's basic training at the Artillery Branch School in 1957. He spent the next eight years in a variety of artillery units as platoon and battery commander positions.

Following his staff officer education at the Army War College in 1965–1967, Kıvrıkoğlu was posted to the 9th Infantry Division in Sarıkamış, Kars, as a staff officer, where he served until 1970.

After graduating from the Armed Forces College in 1970, he served as planning officer at Operations Division of the Allied Forces Southern Europe (AFSOUTH) at Naples, Italy. Between 1972 and 1973, he served as instructor at the Army War College and as section chief at the Turkish General Staff and branch chief at the Turkish Land Forces Command. Kıvrıkoğlu commanded the Cadet Regiment of the Army Academy in Ankara from 1978 to 1980.

After graduating from the NATO Defence College in Rome, Italy, he was promoted to brigadier general in 1980 and assigned to Supreme Headquarters Allied Powers Europe (SHAPE) in Mons, Belgium, where he served as the chief of operations center from 1980 to 1983. Upon returning to Turkey, he assumed the Command of the 3rd Training Infantry and 11th Infantry Brigades between 1983 and 1984 respectively.

In 1984, Kıvrıkoğlu was promoted to major general and assigned to NATO Allied Land Forces South-Eastern Europe (LANDSOUTHEAST) in İzmir, where he served as chief of staff. Later, he commanded the 9th Infantry Division in Sarıkamış from 1986 to 1988.

In 1988, he was promoted to lieutenant general and became assistant chief of staff, personnel, at the Turkish General Staff. From 1990 to 1993, he commanded the 5th Corps and then served as undersecretary of Ministry of National Defence.

In 1993, Kıvrıkoğlu was promoted to full General. He then assumed the Command of NATO LANDSOUTHEAST, where he served until 1996, and later he commanded the Turkish First Army in Istanbul until 1997.

Prior to becoming commander of the Turkish Armed Forces, he served as commander of the Land Forces in 1997–1998.

There are rumours that Kıvrıkoğlu survived an assassination attempt in 1997's "Toros-2/97" exercise in Northern Cyprus. The bullet intended for him killed Colonel Vural Berkay instead.

Hüseyin Kıvrıkoğlu served between August 30, 1998, and August 28, 2002, as the 23rd Chief of the Turkish General Staff.

== Awards and decorations ==
=== Decorations ===
- Turkey:State Medal of Honor
- Turkey: Turkish Armed Forces Medal of Honor
- Turkey: Turkish Armed Forces Medal of Distinguished Service
- Pakistan: Order of Distinction Medal (Hilal-i-Jur'at)
- Romania: Order of the Star of Romania (The Rank of Grand Cross)
- Poland: Class One Commander's Cross of Order of Merit of the Republic of Poland
- South Korea: Order of National Security Merit (Tongil Medal)
- Kazakhstan: Friendship Medal of Kazakhstan Republic
- Azerbaijan: Flag Medal of Azerbaijan
- Azerbaijan: Shohrat Order

=== Badges ===
- Army Academy Graduation Badge
- Post Graduate Badge
- Training and Educational Success Badge
- Operational Success Badge
- Administration and Logistics Service Badge
- NATO Service Badge
- Commander of the Turkish Armed Forces Identification Badge

Military offices
Preceded by Hikmet Köksal	Commander of the Turkish First Army; August 26, 1996–August 26, 1997	Succeeded by Atilla Ateş
Preceded by Hikmet Köksal	Commander of the Turkish Army; August 28, 1997 –August 27, 1998	Succeeded by Atilla Ateş
Preceded by İsmail Hakkı Karadayı	Chief of the General Staff of Turkey; August 30, 1998–August 28, 2002	Succeeded by Hilmi Özkök
