= Aytaç Yalman =

Turkish general (1940–2020)

General Commander of the Gendarmerie of Turkey
- In office 24 August 2000 – 27 August 2002
- Preceded by: Rasim Betir
- Succeeded by: Şener Eruygur

Commander of the Turkish Army
- In office 27 August 2002 – 29 August 2004
- Preceded by: Hilmi Özkök
- Succeeded by: Yaşar Büyükanıt

Personal details
- Born: 29 July 1940 Istanbul, Turkey
- Died: 15 March 2020 (aged 79) Üsküdar, Turkey
- Cause of death: COVID-19
- Spouse: Belma Yalman
- Children: 2

Military service
- Allegiance: Turkey
- Branch/service: Turkish Army
- Years of service: 1961–2004
- Rank: General
- Unit: Artillery

Aytaç Yalman (29 July 1940 – 15 March 2020) was a Turkish general.

== Biography ==
He was the Commander of the Turkish Army (2002–2004) and previously General Commander of the Gendarmerie of Turkey (2000–2002). He was commissioned in an Artillery unit fielding M114 155 mm howitzers, and for the rest of his career below the rank of Colonel, he served in and commanded MGR-1 Honest John Ballistic Missile units. He served as a Gun Position Officer as well as a Fire Direction Officer in a Surface-to-Surface Tactical Ballistic Missile Regiment in the 1970s. Then he served in the Aegean Army and Turkish military forces in Northern Cyprus in the early 1980s. He later commanded an Infantry Division. In 1998, he was promoted to the rank of General and was appointed the Commander of the Second Army. In the same year, he represented Turkey at the Adana Agreement, which regulated the Turkey-Syria relations. Later on, he was appointed the Commander of the Gendarmerie General Command on 24 August 2000, and the Turkish Land Forces on 24 August 2002, respectively. He retired in 2004 due to the army's age limit.

According to General Levent Ersöz, it was Yalman who informed Chief of the General Staff Hilmi Özkök of key military figures' membership of Ergenekon. In 2012, Yalman talked about his role in preventing the "Sledgehammer" coup plan in 2003.

In 2008, Yalman wrote the libretto for "Şehitler Oratoryosu" (Oratorio for the Martyred).

Yalman died from complications of COVID-19 on 15 March 2020, aged 79, three weeks after he had been in Iran, where the disease was prevalent.

== Positions held ==
- Command Post Officer for M114 155 mm howitzer platoon 1961–62
- Gun Position Officer for M114 155 mm howitzer platoon 1962–63
- Assistant Fire Direction Officer for M114 155mm howitzer company 1963–64
- Company second-in-command of Infantry Rifle Company (mandatory 6 month infantry attachment) 1964
- Battery Captain (BK) for M114 155 mm howitzer Battery 1964–1966
- Gun Position Officer for MGR-1 Honest John Ballistic Missile platoon 1966–68
- Assistant Fire Direction Officer for MGR-1 Honest John Ballistic Missile battery 1968–1970
- Fire Direction Officer for MGR-1 Honest John Ballistic Missile battery 1970–71
- Battery Commander of M114 155mm howitzer Battery 1971–73
- Battery Commander of MGR-1 Honest John Ballistic Missile Battery 1973–1975
- Executive Officer (XO) of Gendarmerie Borderguards' Battalion (on lien) 1975–77
- Executive Officer (XO) of MGR-1 Honest John Tactical Ballistic Missile Regiment 1977–80
- Commander of MGR-1 Honest John Ballistic Missile Regiment 1980–1983
- Deputy Instructor in Faculty of Rocketry & Missiles, TSK School of Artillery 1983–1985
- Commander of Field Artillery Brigade, 2nd Corps 1985–1988
- Executive Officer (XO) of 39th Infantry Division 1988–1990
- Commander of 28th Infantry Division 1990–1993
- Chief Staff Officer, 5th Corps (Tekirdag) 1993–1995
- Chief Staff Officer (Heavy Firepower) in General Staff HQ 1995–1996
- Commander, 9th Corps (Elazig), 1996–1998
- Commander of Second Army 1998–2000
- Commander of Gendarmerie General Command 2000–2002
- Commander of Turkish Land Forces 2002–2004
