= Hayri Kıvrıkoğlu =

Turkish general

- Born: 8 August 1948 (age 78); Konya, Turkey
- Military career
- Allegiance: Turkey
- Branch: Turkish Land Forces
- Service years: 1969–2013
- Rank: General

Hayri Kıvrıkoğlu (born 8 August 1948, Konya, Turkey) is a former general who served for the Turkish Army.

== Career ==
In 1969, Kıvrıkoğlu attended the Turkish Military Academy and graduated from the engineering school in 1970.

After several successive promotions he was promoted to brigadier in 1996, joining the 3rd Army Command Operations Staff. He later joined the 8 mechanized Infantry Brigade Command as vice president before being promoted to major general in 2000 and joining the Infantry Division Tactical Command. A position at the 3rd mechanized brigade at Mons Belgium at the National Military Representation Committee before being promoted to lieutenant general in 2006. He served as commander of the 9th Corps Command of the Cyprus Turkish Peace Forces. On 30 August 2008 he was promoted to rank of army general and his appointment as Aegean Army Commander. He served as the commander of the Turkish Land Forces between 2011 and 2013.

== Personal life ==
Kıvrıkoğlu speaks English, is married and has two children. He is related to the former chief of staff, Hüseyin Kıvrıkoğlu.

== See also ==
- List of commanders of the First Army of Turkey
- List of commanders of the Turkish Land Forces

Military offices
Preceded by Necdet Özel	Commander of the Turkish Army; August 4, 2011 – August 30, 2013	Succeeded by Hulusi Akar
