= Hikmet Köksal =

Turkish general (1932–2020)

Commander of the Turkish Army
- In office 27 August 1996 – 28 August 1997
- Preceded by: Mehmet Hikmet Bayer
- Succeeded by: Hüseyin Kıvrıkoğlu

Personal details
- Born: 1932 Yusufeli, Turkey
- Died: February 25, 2020 (aged 87–88) Istanbul, Turkey

Military service
- Allegiance: Turkey
- Branch/service: Turkish Army
- Years of service: 1953 – 1997
- Rank: General

Hikmet Köksal (1932 – February 25, 2020) was a Turkish general, born in Yusufeli. He was the Commander of the Turkish Army during the 1997 "post-modern coup", and previously Commander of the First Army of Turkey (1994–1996). He was one of those arrested in 2012 as part of the investigation of the coup and of the associated West Study Group.
