= Necdet Özel =

28th Chief of the General Staff of the Turkish Armed Forces from 2011 to 2015

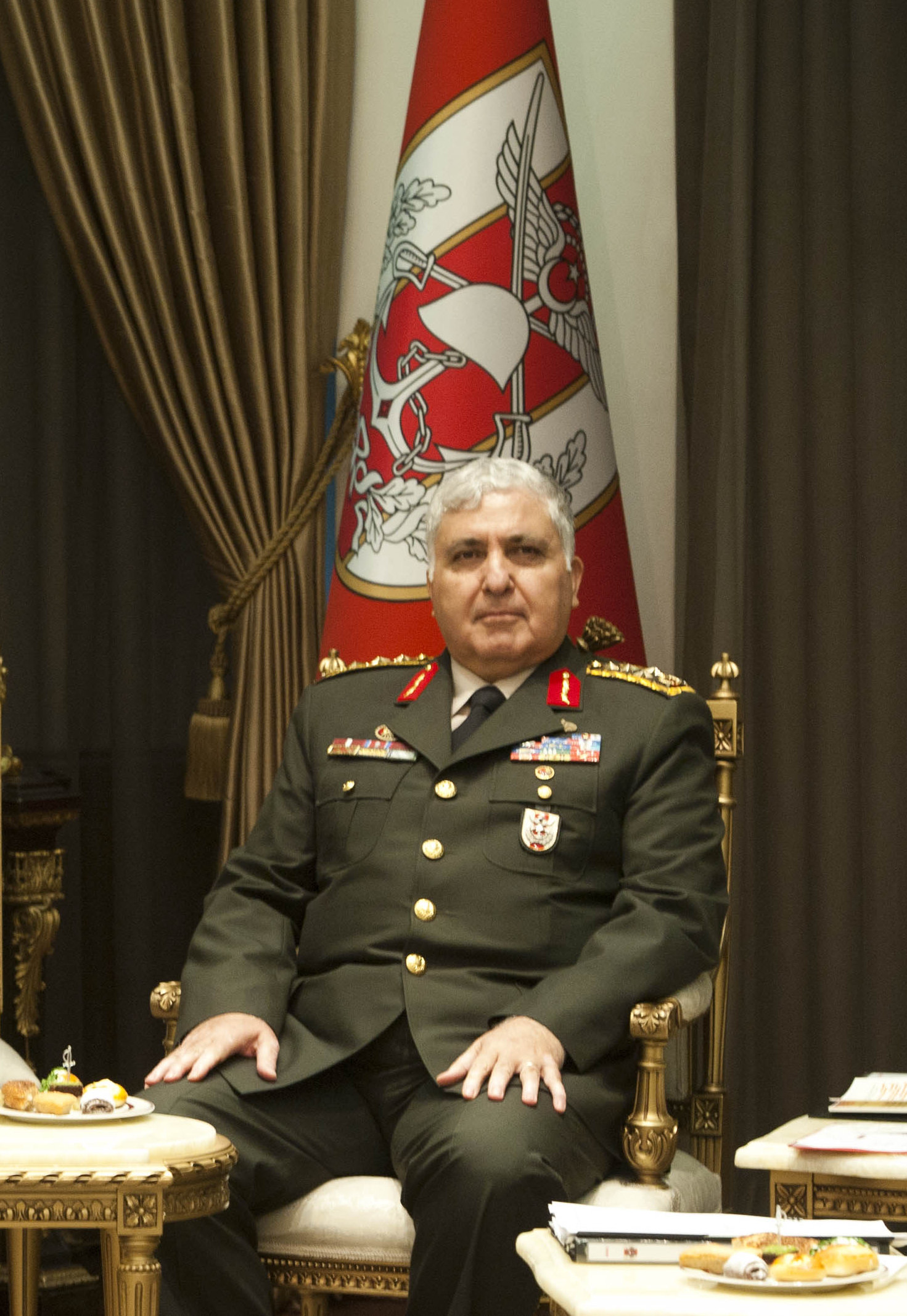

28th Chief of the General Staff
- In office 30 July 2011 – 18 August 2015
- President: Abdullah Gül; Recep Tayyip Erdoğan
- Preceded by: Işık Koşaner
- Succeeded by: Hulusi Akar

Personal details
- Born: October 10, 1950 (age 76) Ankara, Turkey
- Spouse: Neriman Kamuran Özel
- Children: 1
- Education: Turkish Military Academy; London School of Economics

Military service
- Allegiance: Turkey
- Branch/service: Turkish Armed Forces
- Years of service: 1969–2015 (46 years)
- Rank: General
- Commands: Chief of the General Staff; Commander of Land Forces; Commander of Gendarmerie; 2nd Army Command; Aegean Army Command; Training and Doctrine Command; 7th Corps Command; 39th Mechanized Infantry Division; Chief of Internal Security Operations; 172nd Armored Brigade Command; 17th Infantry Regiment Command

Necdet Özel (born 10 October 1950) is a Turkish general, who served as the 28th Chief of the General Staff of the Turkish Armed Forces. He also served as the commander of the Turkish Land Forces. Özel is only the second in this position not to have NATO experience.

== Early life and education ==
Özel was born in 1950 in Ankara. He graduated from the Turkish Military Academy in 1969 and the Infantry School in 1970. In 1975 he attended the London School of Economics for postgraduate studies in International Diplomacy.

== Military career ==
Özel served as a platoon leader and company commander in various units of the Turkish Land Forces Command (TLFC) until 1978. Following his graduation from Army War College in 1980 as a staff officer, he respectively served as operations plan officer at Turkish Peace Forces HQ in Cyprus, branch chief and then as the secretary general at the General Secretariat of Turkish Land Forces, chief of staff at the Turkish Military Academy, and as the commander of the 17th Infantry Regiment.

Having been promoted to brigadier general in 1995, he served as the commander of the 172nd Armored Brigade and as the Chief of Internal Security Operations Department, TLFC.

After his promotion to major general in 1999, he assumed the command of the 39th Mechanized Infantry Division and of the Army War College.

== High command ==
In 2003, he was promoted to lieutenant general and served as the commander of the 7th Corps and then as the deputy commander of Training and Doctrine Command, TLFC.

As a general, he served as the commander of Aegean Army between 2007–2008, as the commander of the 2nd Army between 2008–2010, and as the commander of gendarmerie between 2010–2011. After serving as the commander of TLFC and as the acting commander of the Turkish Armed Forces (TAF) between 29 July and 4 August 2011, he assumed the command of Turkish Armed Forces on 4 August 2011. Between 4 August 2011 and 18 August 2015, he served as the 28th chief of the Turkish General Staff, succeeded by Hulusi Akar.

== Personal life ==
Özel is married to Kamuran Özel. They have one child.

Military offices
| Preceded by Avni Atila Işık | Commander of the Turkish Gendarmerie; 24 August 2010 – 29 July 2011 | Succeeded by Bekir Kalyoncu |
| Preceded by Erdal Ceylanoğlu | Commander of the Turkish Army; 29 July 2011 – 4 August 2011 | Succeeded by Hayri Kıvrıkoğlu |
| Preceded by Işık Koşaner | Chief of the General Staff of Turkey; 4 August 2011 – 18 August 2015 | Succeeded by Hulusi Akar |
