= Işık Koşaner =

27th Chief of the General Staff of the Turkish Armed Forces from 2010 to 2011

- Born: 5 December 1945 (age 80); İzmir, Turkey
- Education: Turkish Military Academy; NATO Defense College; Royal College of Defence Studies
- Spouse: Nurdan Koşaner
- Military career
- Allegiance: Turkey
- Branch: Turkish Land Forces
- Service years: 1965–2011
- Rank: General
- Commands: Chief of the Turkish General Staff; Commander of the Turkish Army; Commander of the Turkish Gendarmerie; Deputy Chief of the Turkish General Staff; Commander of the Turkish Aegean Army; Undersecretary of the Turkish Ministry of Defense; Commander of the Turkish Military Academy

Sebahattin Işık Koşaner (born 5 December 1945) is a Turkish former army general who served as the 27th Chief of the General Staff from 2010 to 2011.

== Biography ==
Koşaner was born in İzmir, Turkey, in 1945. He graduated from the Turkish Military Academy in 1965 and the Infantry School in 1966. Until 1976 he served in several contingents of the Turkish Army as a platoon and company commander, as an instructor at the Mountain Commando School & Training Center Command in Eğirdir, and as a platoon commander within the Turkish Commando Brigade during the Operation Atilla in 1974. He was later appointed as the commander of the Special Operations Forces at the Turkish General Staff Headquarters in Ankara. Koşaner graduated from the Turkish Army Staff College in 1978 and served as a command officer at the Special Warfare Department Command of the Turkish General Staff Headquarters in Ankara. After graduating from the NATO Defense College, he served as a command officer at NATO's Headquarters Allied Forces Southern Europe in Naples, Italy. Koşaner later served at the Planning and Coordination Department of the Logistics Command within the Turkish 3rd Army. After graduating from the Royal College of Defence Studies (RCDS) in London, United Kingdom, Koşaner was appointed as the head of the Strategy Division within the Strategy and Forces Planning Department of the Turkish General Staff Headquarters in Ankara.

As a colonel he commanded the 131st Infantry Regiment at the 8th Infantry Division of the Turkish Army before being appointed as the commander of the Special Operations Command at the Turkish General Staff Headquarters in Ankara. In 1992 Koşaner was promoted to the rank of brigadier general and was appointed with the command of the Logistic Planning Department and later the 1st Commando Brigade of the Turkish Army. Koşaner was promoted to the rank of major general in 1996 and was appointed with the command of the Turkish Army Academy. In 2000 Koşaner was promoted to the rank of lieutenant general and served as the undersecretary of the Turkish Ministry of Defense and later as the commander of the Cyprus Turkish Peace Force in Northern Cyprus. Koşaner was promoted to the rank of general in 2004 and served as the commander of the Turkish Aegean Army and later as the deputy chief of the Turkish General Staff.

== High command ==
On 4 August 2006, General Koşaner was appointed as the commander of the Turkish Gendarmerie. He was followed by General Avni Atila Işık as the Gendarmerie commander, when he took over the command of Turkish Army on 30 August 2008. On 8 August 2010, General Koşaner was appointed as the chief of the General Staff and took up the position on 30 August 2010.

Koşaner, along with the leaders of army, navy and air force simultaneously requested to relinquish their duties and asked for their "retirement" on 29 July 2011, just few days before the important meeting scheduled for 1 August 2011 to discuss appointments of senior military officers. Retirement and Resignation are different terms in Turkish Civil Administrative System. The New York Times stated that their action was to protest the "sweeping arrests of dozens of generals" as a part of a conspiracy investigation. During the investigation that lasted more than a year, more than 40 generals (one tenth of top military commanders) were taken into custody. There were some disagreements between the military and the government as the military wanted to promote some officers but could not since they were suspects of the conspiracy investigation.

== Personal life ==
Koşaner is married to Nurdan Koşaner and has two children.

== See also ==
- Turkish Gendarmerie

Military offices
Preceded by Fevzi Türkeri	Commander of the Turkish Gendarmerie; 4 August 2006 – 30 August 2008	Succeeded by Avni Atila Işık
Preceded by İlker Başbuğ	Commander of the Turkish Army; 30 August 2008 – 30 August 2010	Succeeded by Erdal Ceylanoğlu
Preceded by İlker Başbuğ	Chief of the General Staff of Turkey; 30 August 2010 – 30 July 2011	Succeeded by Necdet Özel
