= Hikmet Bayar =

Turkish general (1932–2019)

Mehmet Hikmet Bayar
- Born: 1932; Gölcük, Kocaeli, Turkey
- Died: July 12, 2019 (aged 86–87); Turkey
- Education: Turkish Military Academy
- Military career
- Allegiance: Turkey
- Branch: Turkish Land Forces
- Service years: 1951–1996
- Rank: General
- Commands: Commander of the Turkish Land Forces; First Army; Third Army; Allied Land Forces Southern Europe; 1st Armored Brigade Command

Mehmet Hikmet Bayar (1932 – July 12, 2019) was a Turkish general who served as the 36th commander of the Turkish Land Forces from 30 August 1994 to 27 August 1996. He also commanded the First and the Third Army, in addition to serving as a commander of Allied Land Forces Southern Europe.

== Career ==
Born and raised in Gölcük, Kocaeli, Turkey, Bayar obtained his graduation as an artillery second lieutenant from Kuleli Military High School in 1951, the Turkish Military Academy in 1953 and Artillery Class School in 1955.

After obtaining his graduation from same Military Academy in 1965, he became a staff officer in 1967. He was promoted to the rank of brigadier general in 1978, major general in 1982, lieutenant general in 1986, and four-star general in 1990.

As a brigadier general he commanded the General Staff at the Plan and Operations department and the 1st Armored Brigade Command. As a major general he headed Chief of Staff office in the Third Army as well as the 3rd Mechanized Division Command. He retired from the Turkish Armed Forces on 30 August 1996.
