= Chief of the Turkish General Staff =

Chief of the General Staff of the Turkish Armed Forces

Chief of the General Staff
- Turkish: Genelkurmay Başkanı
- Shoulder insignia specifically for the chief

- Flag of the Chief of the General Staff

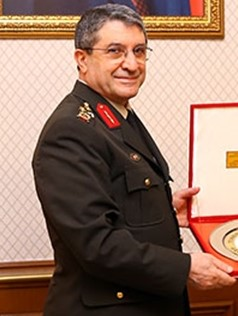
- Incumbent; General Selçuk Bayraktaroğlu since 5 August 2025
- General Staff; Ministry of National Defense
- Member of: General Staff; National Security Council; Supreme Military Council
- Reports to: Minister of National Defense
- Seat: General Staff Building, Ankara
- Nominator: President
- Appointer: President
- Precursor: Chief of the Ottoman General Staff
- Formation: 3 May 1920; 106 years ago
- First holder: Mirliva İsmet İnönü
- Deputy: Second Chief of the General Staff
- Website: Official website

The Chief of the General Staff of the Turkish Armed Forces (Turkish: Türk Silahlı Kuvvetleri Genelkurmay Başkanı) is the chief of the General Staff of the Turkish Armed Forces (Turkish: Türk Silahlı Kuvvetleri). He is appointed by the President of Turkey, who is the commander-in-chief. The position dates to the period of the Government of the Grand National Assembly and the Turkish War of Independence. The post has its own rank insignia, which is the OF-9 (full General or Admiral of the Turkish Armed Forces) rank of the Chief of Staff's personal service branch surrounded by laurel wreaths. In practice, the position has always been held by a Turkish Land Forces officer.

The current Chief of the General Staff is General Selçuk Bayraktaroğlu, since 5 August 2025.

== List of chiefs of the general staff ==
| No. | Portrait | Chief of the General Staff | Took office | Left office | Time in office | Defence branch |
|---|---|---|---|---|---|---|
| 1 | İsmet İnönü | Mirliva; İsmet İnönü (1884–1973) (Note: Minister of General Staff.) | 3 May 1920 | 3 August 1921 | 1 year, 92 days | Ground Forces |
| 2 | Fevzi Çakmak | Mareşal; Fevzi Çakmak (1876–1950) (Note: Minister of General Staff until 6 March 1924.) | 5 August 1921 | 12 January 1944 | 22 years, 160 days | Ground Forces |
| 3 | Kâzım Orbay | General; Kâzım Orbay (1887–1964) | 12 January 1944 | 30 July 1946 | 2 years, 199 days | Ground Forces |
| 4 | Salih Omurtak | General; Salih Omurtak (1889–1954) | 1 August 1946 | 8 June 1949 | 2 years, 311 days | Ground Forces |
| 5 | Abdurrahman Nafiz Gürman | General; Abdurrahman Nafiz Gürman (1882–1966) | 10 June 1949 | 5 June 1950 | 360 days | Ground Forces |
| 6 | Nuri Yamut | General; Nuri Yamut (1890–1961) | 6 June 1950 | 10 April 1954 | 3 years, 308 days | Ground Forces |
| 7 | Nurettin Baransel | General; Nurettin Baransel (1897–1967) | 28 May 1954 | 25 August 1955 | 1 year, 89 days | Ground Forces |
| 8 | Hakkı Tunaboylu | General; Hakkı Tunaboylu (1895–1958) | 25 August 1955 | 10 October 1957 | 2 years, 46 days | Ground Forces |
| 9 | Feyzi Mengüç | General; Feyzi Mengüç (1896–1966) | 11 October 1957 | 22 August 1958 | 315 days | Ground Forces |
| 10 | Rüştü Erdelhun | General; Rüştü Erdelhun (1894–1983) | 23 August 1958 | 27 May 1960 | 1 year, 278 days | Ground Forces |
| 11 | Ragıp Gümüşpala | General; Ragıp Gümüşpala (1897–1964) | 3 June 1960 | 4 August 1960 | 62 days | Ground Forces |
| 12 | Cevdet Sunay | General; Cevdet Sunay (1899–1982) | 4 August 1960 | 16 March 1966 | 5 years, 224 days | Ground Forces |
| 13 | Cemal Tural | General; Cemal Tural (1905–1981) | 16 March 1966 | 16 March 1969 | 3 years | Ground Forces |
| 14 | Memduh Tağmaç | General; Memduh Tağmaç (1904–1978) | 16 March 1969 | 29 August 1972 | 3 years, 166 days | Ground Forces |
| 15 | Faruk Gürler | General; Faruk Gürler (1913–1975) | 29 August 1972 | 6 March 1973 | 250 days | Ground Forces |
| 16 | Semih Sancar | General; Semih Sancar (1911–1984) | 6 March 1973 | 7 March 1978 | 5 years, 1 day | Ground Forces |
| 17 | Kenan Evren | General; Kenan Evren (1917–2015) | 7 March 1978 | 1 July 1983 | 5 years, 55 days | Ground Forces |
| 18 | Nurettin Ersin | General; Nurettin Ersin (1918–2005) | 1 July 1983 | 6 December 1983 | 158 days | Ground Forces |
| 19 | Necdet Üruğ | General; Necdet Üruğ (1921–2021) | 6 December 1983 | 2 July 1987 | 3 years, 208 days | Ground Forces |
| 20 | Necip Torumtay | General; Necip Torumtay (1926–2011) (Note: Torumtay resigned due to strong opposition to President Turgut Özal's stance in favor of joining the Coalition in the Gulf War against Iraq.) | 24 July 1987 | 3 December 1990 | 3 years, 132 days | Ground Forces |
| 21 | Doğan Güreş | General; Doğan Güreş (1926–2014) | 6 December 1990 | 30 August 1994 | 3 years, 267 days | Ground Forces |
| 22 | İsmail Hakkı Karadayı | General; İsmail Hakkı Karadayı (1932–2020) | 30 August 1994 | 30 August 1998 | 4 years | Ground Forces |
| 23 | Hüseyin Kıvrıkoğlu | General; Hüseyin Kıvrıkoğlu (born 1934) | 30 August 1998 | 28 August 2002 | 3 years, 363 days | Ground Forces |
| 24 | Hilmi Özkök | General; Hilmi Özkök (born 1940) | 28 August 2002 | 30 August 2006 | 4 years, 2 days | Ground Forces |
| 25 | Yaşar Büyükanıt | General; Yaşar Büyükanıt (1940–2019) | 30 August 2006 | 30 August 2008 | 2 years | Ground Forces |
| 26 | İlker Başbuğ | General; İlker Başbuğ (born 1943) | 30 August 2008 | 30 August 2010 | 2 years | Ground Forces |
| 27 | Işık Koşaner | General; Işık Koşaner (born 1945) | 30 August 2010 | 29 July 2011 | 333 days | Ground Forces |
| 28 | Necdet Özel | General; Necdet Özel (born 1950) | 30 July 2011 | 18 August 2015 | 4 years, 19 days | Ground Forces |
| 29 | Hulusi Akar | General; Hulusi Akar (born 1952) | 18 August 2015 | 10 July 2018 | 2 years, 326 days | Ground Forces |
| – | Ümit Dündar | General; Ümit Dündar (born 1955); Acting (Note: Dündar served as Acting Chief of the General Staff during the 2016 coup attempt, while Akar was being held hostage by coup forces.) | 15 July 2016 | 16 July 2016 | 1 day | Ground Forces |
| 30 | Yaşar Güler | General; Yaşar Güler (born 1954) | 10 July 2018 | 3 June 2023 | 4 years, 328 days | Ground Forces |
| – | Musa Avsever | General; Musa Avsever (born 1957); Acting | 5 June 2023 | 3 August 2023 | 59 days* | Ground Forces |
| 31 | Metin Gürak | General; Metin Gürak (born 1960) | 3 August 2023 | 5 August 2025 | 2 years, 2 days | Ground Forces |
| 32 | Selçuk Bayraktaroğlu | General; Selçuk Bayraktaroğlu (born 1961) | 5 August 2025 | Incumbent | 1 year, 48 days* | Ground Forces |

* Incumbent's time in office last updated: 22 September 2026.

== See also ==
- Ottoman General Staff
- List of commanders of the Turkish Land Forces
- List of commanders of the Turkish Air Force
- List of commanders of the Turkish Naval Forces
- List of general commanders of the Turkish Gendarmerie
- List of commandants of the Turkish Coast Guard
- List of commanders of the First Army of Turkey
- List of commanders of the Second Army of Turkey
- List of commanders of the Third Army of Turkey
- List of commanders of the Aegean Army

== Sources ==
- Genelkurmay Başkanları listesi (in Turkish)
- Harp Akademileri Komutanlığı, Harp Akademilerinin 120 Yılı, İstanbul, 1968. (in Turkish)
