= Erdal Ceylanoğlu =

Turkish general

- Born: 1945 (age 80–81); Kayseri, Turkey
- Spouse: Şule Ceylanoğlu
- Military career
- Allegiance: Turkey
- Branch: Turkish Army
- Service years: 1966–2011
- Rank: Orgeneral

Erdal Ceylanoğlu (born 1945) is a retired Turkish general. He was Commander of the Turkish Army from 2010 to 2011.

== Career ==
In 1966, he graduated from the Turkish Military Academy and in 1967 he completed infantry training. He was promoted to brigadier general in 1992, major general in 2002, and to army general in 2007. In 2007 he was also appointed command of Army Training and Doctrine. In 2010, he was promoted to commander of the Turkish Army by the Supreme Military Council decision. He resigned on 30 July 2011. He was asked to provide a testimony in court with regard to the 28 February 1997 post-modern coup investigation and was later arrested by the request of the prosecutor.

== Personal life ==
He is married to Şule Ceylanoğlu, with whom he has two children.
