= Army War Institute =

Coordinates: 41.10005°N 29.01372°E

- Kara Harp Enstitüsü
- Type: Military Academy
- Location: Turkey

The Army War Institute (Turkish: Kara Harp Enstitüsü), formerly Army War Academy (Turkish: Kara Harp Akademisi), is an academic institution of the National Defence University. It is sometimes referred to in English as the Turkish Military College.

== Other military colleges ==
It must not be confused with Ottoman Military College, Turkish Military Academy (Kara Harp Okulu) and Armed Forces College (Silahlı Kuvvetler Akademisi), and National Security College (Milli Güvenlik Akademisi).
