= Turkish Armed Forces Medal of Honor =

Highest decoration of the Turkish Armed Forces

- Type: Medal
- Awarded for: Great valor
- Country: Turkey
- Presented by: the Turkish Armed Forces
- Eligibility: Civilian or soldier, of any nationality
- Status: Currently awarded
- First award: 1967
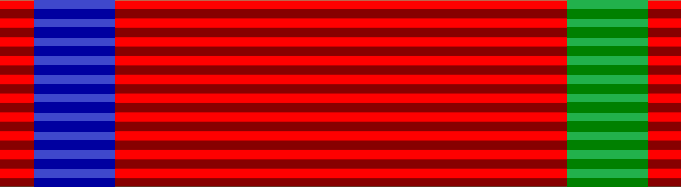
- Ribbon bar of order

Turkish Armed Forces Medal of Honor (Turkish: Türk Silahlı Kuvvetleri Şeref Madalyası) is the highest medal that can be bestowed upon an individual by the Turkish Armed Forces (TAF) and was first created on July 27, 1967.

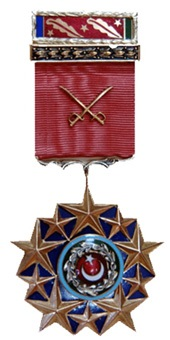
real medal

== Technical specifications ==
=== General ===
Five large and five small gold stars on dark blue background circling an insignia of a crescent moon and a star on red background, the symbol of the Turkish flag, pointing upwards.

=== Decoration (regular size) ===
Made of eight pieces

- Metal: Bronze
- Minting: 0.2 micrometre polished gold-plating
- Weight: 54 grams
- Diameter: 6 cm

=== Decoration (miniature size) ===
Made of three pieces

- Metal: Bronze
- Minting: 0.2 micrometre polished gold-plating
- Weight: 14 grams
- Diameter: 1 cm

=== Ribbon ===
- Color: Red

== Criteria ==
During wartime, it is bestowed on individuals who, through their actions, have contributed to success in battle but whose valor would not be adequately compensated by the State War Medal.

During peacetime, it is bestowed upon the Commanders of the Turkish Army, the Turkish Navy, the Turkish Air Force and the Turkish Gendarmerie who have successfully completed at least a year in their posts.

The medal can be given to civilians or soldiers, regardless of nationality. Its bestowment is proposed and approved by any of the four Commanders mentioned above.

== Recipients ==
- Hüseyin Kıvrıkoğlu

== See also ==
- Medal of Independence (Turkey)
- Turkish Armed Forces Medal of Distinguished Service
- Turkish Armed Forces Medal of Distinguished Courage and Self-Sacrifice
