= Turkish Armed Forces Medal of Distinguished Service =

- Type: Medal
- Awarded for: Extraordinary service to the TAF
- Country: Turkey
- Presented by: the Turkish Armed Forces
- Eligibility: Civilian or soldier, of any nationality
- Status: Currently awarded
- First award: 1967, since 1983 in its current form
- Website: http://www.tsk.tr/2_genel_bilgiler/madalyalar.html

Turkish Armed Forces Medal of Distinguished Service (Turkish: Türk Silahlı Kuvvetleri Üstün Hizmet Madalyası) was first created on July 27, 1967 and took its current form on July 29, 1983.

== Technical specifications ==
=== General ===
Five large and five small stars on dark blue background circling an insignia of a crescent moon and a star on red background, the symbol of the Turkish flag, pointing upwards.

=== Decoration (regular size) ===
Made of eight pieces

- Metal: Bronze
- Minting: 5 micrometre polished silver-plating
- Weight: 54 grams
- Diameter: 6 cm

=== Decoration (miniature size) ===
Made of three pieces

- Metal: Bronze
- Minting: 5 micrometre polished silver-plating
- Weight: 14 grams
- Diameter: 1 cm

=== Ribbon ===
- Color: Red

== Criteria ==
During war or peace, it is bestowed upon individuals whose contributions to the strengthening of the Turkish Armed Forces (TAF) have been extraordinarily high. In other words, it is awarded to any individual that has served national interests with exemplary determination and has contributed greatly to the prestige and strength of the TAF. This encompasses any military, scientific, material or administrative contribution, in or outside the territory of the Republic of Turkey, that has been greater than any of that person's predecessors thanks to his/her great courage and self-sacrifice.

The medal can be given to civilians or soldiers, regardless of nationality. Its bestowment is proposed by any of the Commanders of the four branches of the TAF, namely the Army, the Navy, the Air Force or the Gendarmerie (with the exception of the Commander of the fifth branch, the Coast Guard). The outcome of any proposition depends on the approval of the Chief of the General Staff.

== See also ==
- Medal of Independence (Turkey)
- Turkish Armed Forces Medal of Honor
- Turkish Armed Forces Medal of Distinguished Courage and Self-Sacrifice
