= Korutürk =

Korutürk is a Turkish surname. Notable people with the surname include:

- Emel Korutürk (1915–2013), Turkish painter and First Lady of Turkey
- Fahri Korutürk (1903–1987), Turkish navy officer, diplomat and sixth President of Turkey
- Osman Korutürk (born 1944), Turkish diplomat and politician
- Zergün Korutürk (born 1948), Turkish diplomat
