= Necdet Uran =

Turkish admiral (1910–1973)

- Born: 1910; Istanbul, Ottoman Empire
- Died: 14 February 1973 (aged 62–63)
- Alma mater: Turkish Naval Academy
- Military career
- Allegiance: Turkey
- Branch: Turkish Naval Forces
- Service years: 1930–1968
- Rank: Admiral
- Commands: Commander of the Turkish Naval Forces; TCG Hamidiye

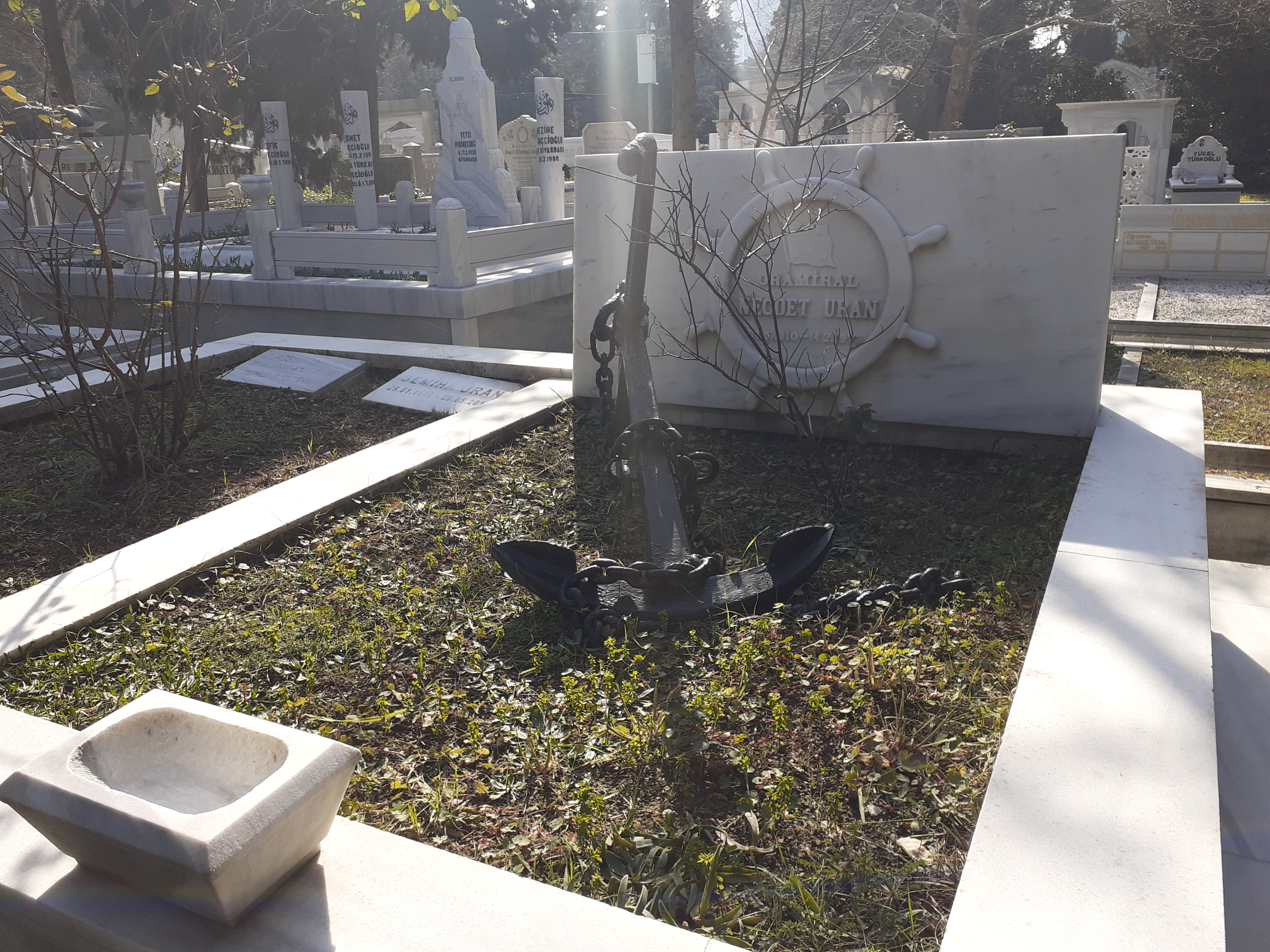

Necdet Uran (1910 – 14 February 1973) was an admiral in the Turkish Naval Forces who served as the 5th commander-in-chief of the Navy from 20 June 1961 to 16 August 1968. He commanded the Turkish Naval Academy from 1952 and 1954, TCG Gaziantep, a Tinaztepe-class destroyer, and commander of Naval Fleet.

== Biography ==
Uran was born in Istanbul. He received his early education from Naval High School. He obtained his graduation from the Turkish Naval Academy as an ensign in 1930. After completing his military training, he became in-charge of TCG Hamidiye, TCG Zafar, and TCG Yavuz. He also served as a navigation officer of TCG Kocatepe.

Uran was promoted to the rank of lieutenant commander in 1942 and was subsequently appointed as a chief of staff of the Reserve Fleet and War Fleet. He was promoted to the rank of captain in 1952 and was subsequently appointed as commander of the Naval Academy. He was promoted to the rank of rear admiral and vice admiral in 1960. He was a part of Turkish Delegate in Malta between 1958 and 1960. Uran was promoted to the rank admiral in 1963 and became commander-in-chief of the Turkish Naval Forces. He retired from the service in 1968.
