= Mehmet Ali Ülgen =

Turkish admiral (1887–1952)

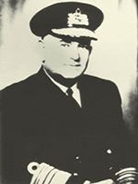
- Born: 1887; Istanbul, Turkey
- Died: 1957 (aged 69–70)
- Alma mater: Turkish Naval Academy
- Military career
- Allegiance: Turkey
- Branch: Turkish Naval Forces
- Service years: 1905–1950
- Rank: Admiral
- Commands: Commander-in-Chief Turkish Naval Forces; Marmara Naval Base; Turkish Battle Fleet
- Conflicts: Sevastopol War; Bombardment of Odessa

Mehmet Ali Ülgen (1887 – 1952) was a Turkish admiral who served as commander-in-chief of the Turkish Naval Forces from 1 July 1949 to 6 June 1950. He joined the Navy in 1905 after graduating from the Turkish Naval Academy an ensign.

Born and raised in Istanbul, Ülgen was promoted to the rank of lieutenant commander in 1925, rear admiral in 1936, vice admiral in 1945, and admiral in 1948 before retiring voluntarily in 1949. He commanded Kocaeli Fortified Area, Marmara Naval Base, and Turkish Fleet Forces Command. He also served as commander of War Fleet, and undersecretary to the Ministry of National Defense after 1948.

== Career ==
Ülgen received his offshore training from Heybetnüma ship and Asar-i Tevfik, and was subsequently appointed as an artillery officer at gunboat BAFRA, Peyk-i Şevket, Muin-i Zafer, Mesudiye, RV Barbaros Hayreddin Paşa, and Asar-i Tevfik.

As an artillery officer of Mecidiye, he participated in Bombardment of Odessa between 1914 and 1918. He also participated in Sevastopol War. He was later appointed as commander of Selman-ı Pak gunboat. Later in 1918 he was appointed as executive officer of GİRESUN vessel. He also commanded Yavuz drillship, and Hamidiye cruiser unit 1925.

As a lieutenant commander, he was appointed as divisional chief of the Ministry of the Navy, flotilla leader, Reserve Fleet, and Marmara Naval Base commander. He later appointed as a deputy chief and the commander of the Turkish Battle Fleet. He became commander-in-chief of the Navy on 1 July 1949 and retired voluntarily a year after he was succeeded by admiral Sadık Altıncan on 13 June 1950.
