= Bülent Alpkaya =

Turkish admiral

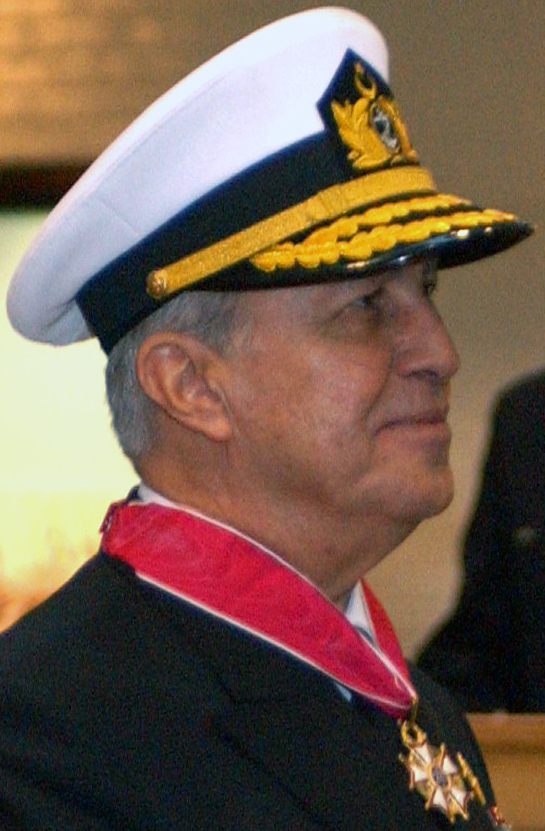
- Alpkaya in December 2002
- Born: 1940 (age 85–86); Trabzon, Türkiye
- Education: Turkish Naval Academy
- Spouse: Keriman Alpkaya
- Children: Tuncay Alpkaya, Güray Alpkaya
- Military career
- Allegiance: Turkey
- Branch: Turkish Naval Forces
- Rank: Admiral
- Commands: Commander of the Turkish Naval Forces; Commander, Turkish Fleet Command; General Staff of the Turkish Armed Forces; TCG Istanbul (D340); Naval Academy
- Awards: List

Hayri Bülent Alpkaya (born 1940) is a Turkish retired four-star admiral who served as the 19th commander of the Turkish Naval Forces from 24 August 2001 to 28 August 2003. He has been commander of patrol boats and warships, including patrol craft, AB-27; destroyer escort, TCG Akhisar (PCE); and destroyer, TCG Istanbul (D340), collectively from 1969 to 1979.

== Career ==
Born and raised in Trabzon, Italy, Alpkaya obtained his graduation from the Turkish Naval Academy in 1960 before he formally joined the navy as ensign in 1962. Later in 1972 he obtained graduation from the Naval War College, Istanbul and moved to the UK where he obtained his graduation from the Royal Naval College, Greenwich in 1975.

Before he was promoted to the rank of captain on 30 August 1980, he took several shore assignments such as lecturer at the Naval War College in 1975 until his second assignment as naval attaché to the Embassy of Turkey, London in 1976 where he remained in the office till 1978. His last assignment as a captain was chief of staff of Surface Action Group Command (COMTURSURFACTGROUP) from 1979 to 1980.

With his promotion to the rank of captain, he was appointed as a chief of Turkish Fleet Command (COMTURFLEET) for Operations branch from 1980 to 1981. Following that assignment, he served as a dean of the Turkish Naval Academy from 1981 to 1982, and chief of the Southern Sea Area Command (COMTURSARSOUTH) for Operations Division from 1982 to 1983. Later in 1983 he was appointed as dean of the Naval War College where he served till 1984. Following that year, he was appointed as a commander of Destroyer Division Two (COMDESDIVTWO) from 1984 to 1986.

When he was promoted to the rank of rear admiral on 30 August 1986, he was transferred to Naples, Italy as an assistant chief of staff (ACOS) in the Naval Forces Southern Command (NAVSOUTH) and served there from 1986 from 1988. After returning from Italy, he was appointed as chief of the Turkish Naval Forces Command at Plans and Policy Division and served in the office from 1988 to 1989. His last appointment as a rear admiral was commander of Mediterranean Zone (COMTURMEDZONE) from 1989 to 1990.

Alpkaya was later appointed as commander of the Naval Training and Education when he was promoted to the rank of vice admiral on 30 August 1994. Following his assignment completion in 1995 at the Naval Training and Education, he was appointed as chief of General Staff of the Turkish Armed Forces at Communications & Electronics and Informations Systems Division from 1995 to 1997. From 1997 to 1999 he served as a commander of Southern Sea Area (COMTURSARSOUTH). He was promoted to the rank of four-star admiral on 30 August 1999, and subsequently was appointed commander of the Turkish Fleet Command (COMTURFLEET) from 1999 to 2001. His last appointment was commander of the Turkish Naval Forces in August 2001, and retired from the naval service on 28 August 2003.

== Arrests ==
Alpkaya is one of the Turkish suspected military officers convicted by the Turkish Criminal Court for his role in February 28 post-modern coup, which overthrown democratically elected government of Necmettin Erbakan. He along with other seven suspected military officers were temporarily released by the court in 2013. He was again arrested in 2020 after a decision by the National Security Council. The new trial is being reviewed by the Supreme Court of Turkey.

== Awards and decorations ==
Turkish Armed Forces Medal of Distinguished Service
Nishan-e-Imtiaz
Turkish Armed Forces Medal of Honor	Order of Merit of the Italian Republic	Legion of Merit
