= Münci Kapani =

Turkish academic and politician (1921–1993)

- Born: Mehmet Münci; 16 May 1921; İzmir, Ottoman Empire
- Died: 21 June 1993 (aged 72)
- Education: Ankara University; University of Geneva
- Spouse: Margaret Elizabeth Kapani
- Scientific career
- Fields: Law

Münci Kapani (1921–1993) was a Turkish academic, politician and writer. He is known for his studies on public law and political activities in the mid-1950s.

== Early life and education ==
He was born Mehmet Münci in İzmir on 16 May 1921. He graduated from Galatasaray High School and received a degree in law from Ankara University. He completed his Ph.D. studies at the University of Geneva in 1948.

== Career and activities ==
One year after his graduation Kapani joined his alma mater as a research assistant. He was promoted to associated professorship and worked as a visiting professor in the USA and in the United Kingdom. He left his academic career in 1956 and began to take part in politics becoming a member of the Liberty Party. He was involved in oppositional activities against the ruling Democrat Party (DP). During this period he published articles in the Forum magazine and shaped the magazine's ideological framework along with Şerif Mardin, Bülent Ecevit, Turhan Feyzioğlu and Attilâ İlhan. Kapani also contributed to Yeni Gün (Turkish: The New Day), the official newspaper of the Liberty Party.

Following the military coup on 27 May 1960 the DP was banned, and a Constituent Assembly was formed. Kapani was made a member of the Assembly. He was appointed to the Constitutional Commission which was established by the Assembly in January 1961. The Commission was headed by Turhan Feyzioğlu and Enver Ziya Karal. Some of the other Commission members included Muammer Aksoy, Turan Güneş, Doğan Avcıoğlu, Coşkun Kırca and Mümtaz Soysal.

Kapani returned to his teaching post at Ankara University and became a professor of public law in 1964. He was among the signatories of the 1966 declaration by the faculty members of Ankara University's Faculty of Law and Faculty of Political Science which criticized Prime Minister Süleyman Demirel of acting against secularism. From the late 1960s Kapani's views were frequently featured in Ant, a socialist magazine. Kapani resigned from the university in 1983 as a protest against the establishment of the Council of Higher Education.

Kapani is the author of various books on public law, political sciences and human rights. His first book, Les pouvoirs extraordinaires de l'Exécutrij en temps de guerre et de crise nationale, was published in 1949.

== Personal life and death ==
Kapani settled in Karşıyaka, İzmir, after his retirement. He was married to Margaret Elizabeth Kapani. He is the father-in-law of Osman Korutürk, a diplomat and politician.

Kapani died on 21 June 1993.

His books were donated to the library of İzmir Municipality.
