= List of commanders of the Turkish Naval Forces =

Commander of the Turkish Naval Forces
- Türk Deniz Kuvvetleri Komutanlığı
- Flag of Turkish Naval Forces Command

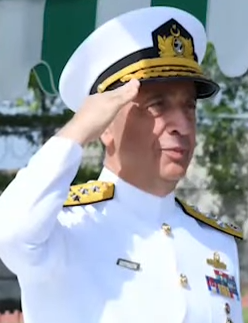
- Incumbent; Admiral Ercüment Tatlıoğlu since 19 August 2022
- Ministry of National Defence; Turkish Naval Forces
- Member of: National Security Council; Supreme Military Council
- Reports to: Minister of National Defence
- Nominator: President of Turkey
- Appointer: President of Turkey
- Precursor: Fleet Commander of the Ottoman Navy
- Formation: 1 July 1949
- First holder: Mehmet Ali Ülgen
- Website: www.dzkk.tsk.tr

This list includes commanders of the Turkish Naval Forces (Turkish: Türk Deniz Kuvvetleri Komutanlığı), who were, in their time of service, nominal heads of the Turkish Naval Forces (or Turkish Navy).

The current Commander of the Turkish Naval Forces is Admiral Ercüment Tatlıoğlu, since 19 August 2022.

No.	Commander	Picture	Took office	Left office
1	Admiral Mehmet Ali Ülgen		1 July 1949	6 June 1950
2	Admiral Sadık Altıncan		13 June 1950	12 September 1957
3	Admiral Fahri Korutürk		12 September 1957	2 July 1960
4	Vice admiral Ahmet Zeki Özak		2 July 1960	20 June 1961
5	Admiral Necdet Uran		20 June 1961	16 August 1968
6	Admiral Celal Eyiceoğlu		16 August 1968	30 August 1972
7	Admiral Kemal Kayacan		30 August 1972	23 August 1974
8	Admiral Hilmi Fırat		23 August 1974	9 August 1977
9	Admiral Bülend Ulusu		9 August 1977	10 August 1980
10	Admiral Nejat Tümer		10 August 1980	6 December 1983
11	Admiral Zahit Atakan		6 December 1983	22 August 1986
12	Admiral Emin Göksan		22 August 1986	22 August 1988
13	Admiral Orhan Karabulut		22 August 1988	20 August 1990
14	Admiral İrfan Tınaz		20 August 1990	20 August 1992
15	Admiral Vural Beyazıt		20 August 1992	18 August 1995
16	Admiral Güven Erkaya		18 August 1995	29 August 1997
17	Admiral Salim Dervişoğlu		29 August 1997	26 August 1999
18	Admiral Ilhami Erdil		26 August 1999	24 August 2001
19	Admiral Bülent Alpkaya		24 August 2001	28 August 2003
20	Admiral Özden Örnek		28 August 2003	26 August 2005
21	Admiral Yener Karahanoğlu		26 August 2005	24 August 2007
22	Admiral Metin Ataç		24 August 2007	30 August 2009
23	Admiral Eşref Uğur Yiğit		30 August 2009	29 July 2011
24	Admiral Emin Murat Bilgel		4 August 2011	23 August 2013
25	Admiral Bülent Bostanoğlu		23 August 2013	22 August 2017
26	Admiral Adnan Özbal		22 August 2017	19 August 2022
27	Admiral Ercüment Tatlıoğlu		19 August 2022	Incumbent

== See also ==
- Chief of the Turkish General Staff
- List of commanders of the Turkish Land Forces
- List of commanders of the Turkish Air Force
- List of general commanders of the Turkish Gendarmerie
- List of commandants of the Turkish Coast Guard
