= Bülent Bostanoğlu =

Turkish admiral

- Born: 24 December 1953 (age 72); Karadeniz Ereğli, Zonguldak Province, Turkey
- Military career
- Allegiance: Turkey
- Branch: Turkish Naval Forces
- Service years: 1973–2017
- Rank: Admiral
- Commands: Commander of Naval Forces; Commander of Naval Fleet; Northern Sea Area Command; Commander of Naval Training and Education; Surface Action Group & Northern Task Group; Commander of Naval War College; Southern Task Group; Escort and Patrol Boats Task Group; Destroyer Squadron 4 Command; TCG Muavenet (F-250) Command; TCG Savastepe (D-348) Command
- Awards: TAF Medal of Honor; TAF Medal of Distinguished Courage and Self-Sacrifice; TAF Medal of Distinguished Service; NATO Medal for the former Yugoslavia

Recep Bülent Bostanoğlu (born 24 December 1953) is a retired Turkish admiral, who served as the Commander of the Turkish Naval Forces between 2013 and 2017.

== Early life and education ==
Bostanoğlu was born on August 23, 1953, in Karadeniz Ereğli, Zonguldak Province, Turkey. He graduated from the Turkish Naval High School in Istanbul in 1970 and the Turkish Naval Academy in 1973.

== Naval career ==
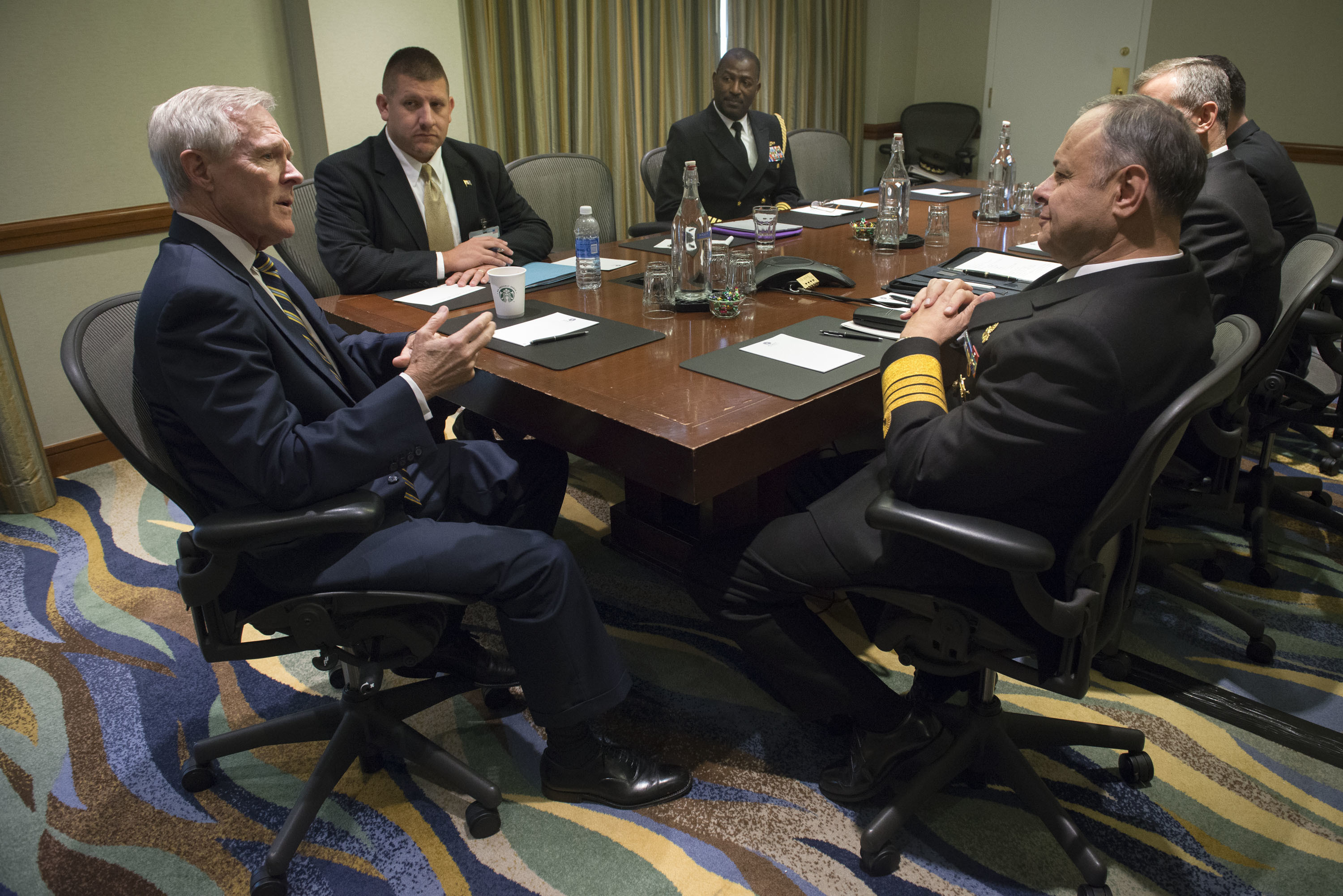
Adm. Bülent Bostanoglu (at right) in a meeting with U.S. Secretary of the Navy Ray Mabus.

Bostanoğlu began to serve as the Communications Officer onboard TCG Tinaztepe (D-355), after completing his Fundamental Officers Training. During his sea tour from 1975 until 1980 he assumed a variety of duties, respectively as the Division Officer and Department Head, on board the patrol boat TCG Sultanhisar (P-111) and the destroyers TCG Tinaztepe (D-355), TCG Berk (D-358) and TCG Adatepe (D-353). Graduating from the Turkish Naval War College in 1982, he served on board TCG Anittepe (D-347) as the Navigation and Operations Officer.

From 1983 until 1989, he was assigned as the NATO Exercise Planning Officer in Turkish Navy Headquarters and graduated from the Turkish Armed Forces College in 1989. From 1989 until 1991, Bostanoğlu served as the Executive Officer on board the destroyer TCG Savaştepe. During this period, he graduated from the Naval War College in the United States in 1990. He then commanded the destroyer TCG Savaştepe (D-348) from 1991 to 1993 and the frigate TCG Muavenet (F-250) from 1993 to 1994.

After his sea tour, he was assigned as Branch Head of Plans & Organization Division in the Turkish Fleet Headquarters from 1994 until 1995. In 1995, he was appointed to Athens, Greece for three years as the Naval Attaché. Before his promotion to the flag ranks, he commanded Destroyer Division Four from 1998 until 1999 and later served as Chief of Operations Directorate in the Turkish Fleet Headquarters till 2000. After being promoted to rear admiral (lower half) in 2000, Bostanoğlu served in Plans & Policy Directorate in the Turkish General Staff Headquarters. Afterwards, he commanded the Turkish Escort and Patrol Boats Flotilla from 2002 until 2003 and assumed his duty as the commander of Southern Task Group in 2003.

Bostanoğlu was promoted to rear admiral (upper half) on 30 August 2004. He then served as the Commander of Turkish Naval War College till 2005, Chief of Operations Directorate at the Turkish Navy Headquarters from 2005 to 2007, Commander of the Surface Action Group & Northern Task Group till 2008 and Chief of Staff of the Fleet Command from 2008 until 2009.

Bostanoğlu was promoted to vice admiral on 30 August 2009. Upon his promotion to vice admiral, he assumed Chief of Communications, Electronics & Information Systems Directorate in the Turkish General Staff Headquarters from 2009 until 2010. He subsequently commanded Naval Training and Education Command until August 2011 and Northern Sea Area Command from August 2011 to January 2013. He was assigned to the Turkish Fleet as the Commander in January 2013.

Bostanoğlu was promoted to the rank of admiral in 2013, and was assigned as the 25th commander of the Turkish Naval Forces on 23 August 2013. He was retired in 2017.

== Personal life ==
Admiral Bülent Bostanoğlu was married to Ceyda Bostanoğlu, with whom he has two children: son Mert and daughter Deniz. Ceyda Bostanoğlu died due to illness in 2008. Bülent Bostanoğlu later married Belgin Ergenç Bostanoğlu on 20 December 2014.

Military offices
Preceded by Emin Murat Bilgel	Commander of the Turkish Naval Forces; 23 August 2013 – 2 August 2017	Succeeded by Adnan Özbal
