= Adnan Özbal =

Turkish admiral

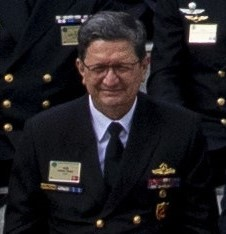
- Born: 30 October 1958 (age 68); Istanbul, Turkey
- Spouse: Gaye Özbal
- Children: 1
- Military career
- Allegiance: Turkey
- Branch: Turkish Naval Forces
- Service years: 1980–present
- Rank: admiral
- Commands: TCG Şahin; TCSG-22; TCG Rüzgar; 2. Assault Boat Flotilla; Naval Academy Command; Coast Guard Command; Turkish Naval Education and Training Command; Turkish Naval Forces
- Awards: NATO Medal (Former Yugoslavia); U.S. Navy Merit Medal

Adnan Özbal (born 30 October 1958 in Istanbul) is a four-star Turkish Navy admiral who had served as the 26th Commander of Turkish Naval Forces.

== Career ==
After completing his primary and secondary education, he entered the Naval High School in 1973 and from the Turkish Naval Academy in 1980 to TCG Istanbul in 1980 and 1981, and as an operational electronics officer in the destroyers of TCG Marshal Fevzi Çakmak (D-349) between 1981 and 1983, 1983 Between the years 1985, TCG Şahin II. Command, served as the TCSG-22 Command between 1986 and 1987. He completed his Naval War Academy education between 1987 and 1989 and served as the Commandership of the Assault Boat Fleet Operations Section in 1989–1991, as TCG Şahin Command between 1991 and 1993, and as the Project Officer of the General Staff Intelligence Department (Genelkurmay İstihbarat Daire Başkanlığı) between 1993 and 1995.

TCG Wind Command in 1995–1996, exercise project officer at Strikforsouth Headquarters in Naples between 1996 and 1999, Department of the Project and Financial Program Department of the Naval Forces Command Plan Principles between 1999 and 2003, 2 years between 2003 and 2005. He served as Commodore for Fast Patrol Boat Flotilla, Logistics Head of the Northern Sea Area Command between 2005 and 2006, and Operations Head between 2006 and 2008. In 2008, he was promoted to the rank of senior admiral.

He served as the Chief of Staff of the Northern Sea Area Command between 2008 and 2010, the Command of the Assault Boat Fleet between 2010 and 2011, and the Head of the Personal Plan and Management Department in 2011. In 2012, he was promoted to the rank of Rear Admiral and was appointed to the Naval Academy Command. He was promoted to the rank of vice admiral with the decisions of the 2017 Supreme Military Council (YAŞ) and was appointed to the Turkish Naval Forces Command.

During his time, the MILGEM project, which produced modern warships for the Turkish navy, continued, and the first amphibious aircraft carrier and flagship of the Turkish navy, TCG-Anadolu, was coming to an end.

At the Supreme Military Council meeting held on 2 August 2018, he was promoted to the rank of Admiral effective from 30 August 2018. He received his bachelor's degree from Anadolu University Faculty of Economics in 1995. Özbal, who is married to Gaye Özbal, has a daughter from this marriage. He is the holder of the NATO Medal (Former Yugoslavia) and the US Navy Medal of Merit.

Military offices
Preceded by Bülent Bostanoğlu	Commanders of the Turkish Naval Forces; 22 August 2017 - 19 August 2022	Succeeded by Ercüment Tatlıoğlu
Preceded by Hasan Uşaklıoğlu	Commandants of the Turkish Coast Guard; 12 August 2013 - 12 August 2014	Succeeded by Hakan Üstem
