= Göksun (given name) =

- Gender: Feminine
- Language: Turkish

Origin
- Language: Turkish
- Origin: gök
- Derivation: "gök" + "sun"
- Meaning: "(the one who) rises to the sky"

Other names
- See also: Gökay, Gökçe, Gökçen, Gökhan, Göksu

Göksun is a feminine Turkish given name. In Turkish, "Göksun" means "(the one who) rises to the sky".

== People ==
=== Given name ===
- Göksun Çam, a Turkish actress.
- Göksun Uzun, a Turkish model and a contestant in Turkey's Next Top Model 1996

=== Surname ===
- Hasan Göksun, a Turkish football player currently playing in Gençlik Gücü S.K.
- Leyla Göksun, Turkish actress
