= Eşref Uğur Yiğit =

Turkish admiral

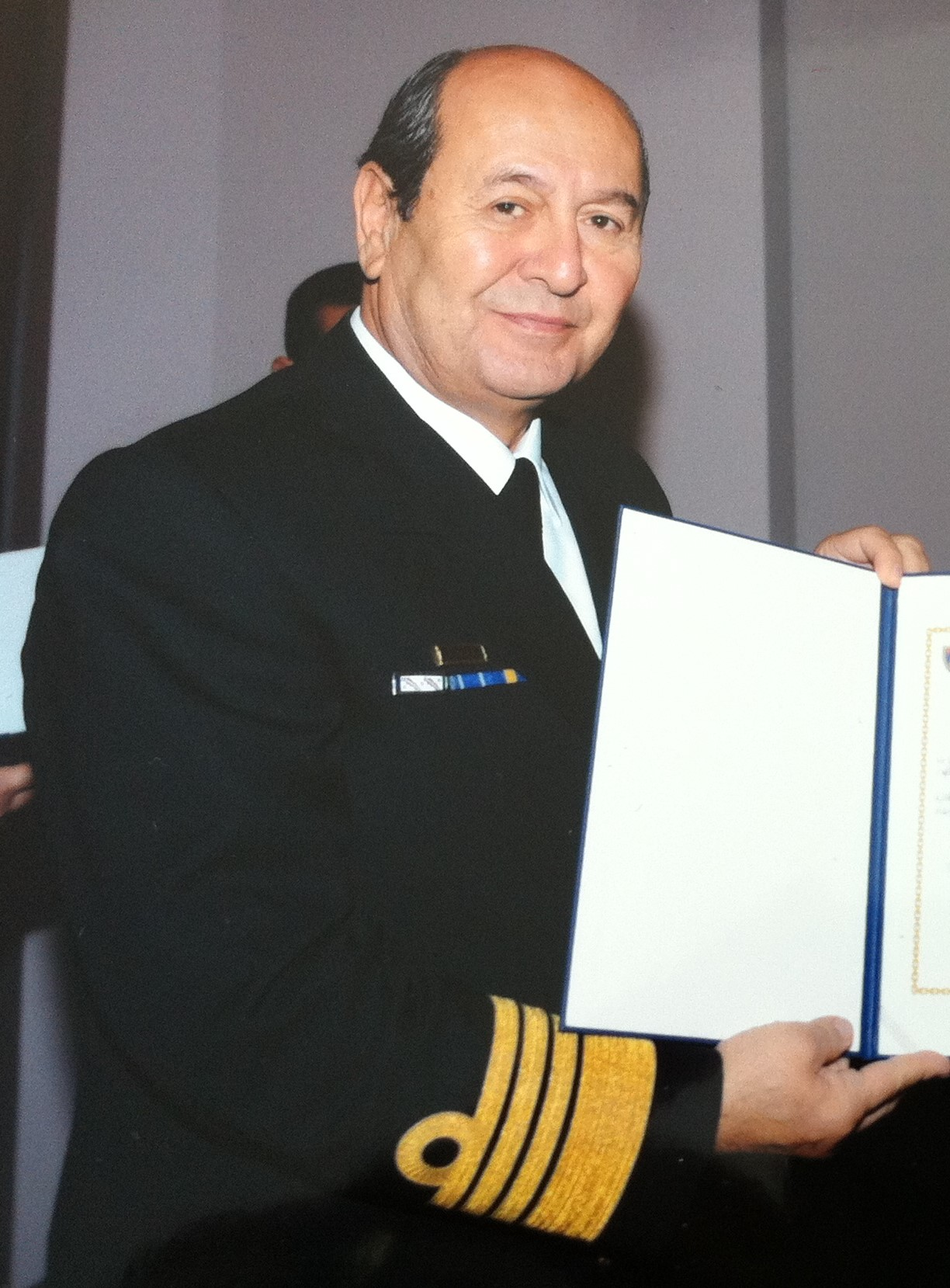
- Born: 1945 (age 80–81); Istanbul, Turkey
- Military career
- Allegiance: Turkey
- Branch: Turkish Naval Forces
- Service years: 1962–2011
- Rank: Admiral
- Commands: Commander of Naval Forces
- Awards: TAF Medal of Honor; TAF Medal of Distinguished Courage and Self-Sacrifice; TAF Medal of Distinguished Service
- Other work: Çanakkale Strait Command, Head of Naval Forces Logistics, Mine Fleet, Head of Naval Forces Inspection and Assessment, Naval Forces Chief of Staff, Northern Sea Area Command, Naval Command, Turkish Naval Forces, Naval Forces Plan Organization Department National and NATO Plan Officer, Mine Fleet Command, Operations Branch Directorate, TCG Muavenet II. Command, Chief of Operations Department of Naval Forces, Operations Plan Officer at NAVSOUTH NATO Headquarters in Naples, Commander of TCG Yücetepe

Eşref Uğur Yiğit (born 1945) is a Turkish admiral. He was commander-in-chief of the Turkish Navy from 30 August 2009 to 29 July 2011. He is a holder of the Turkish Armed Forces Medal of Distinguished Service.

In 2010, the Turkish 12th High Criminal Court accepted an indictment on a plot by some naval lieutenants to assassinate Turkish Naval Forces admirals, including Admiral Yiğit.

== Career ==
He entered the Naval High School in 1959. He graduated from the Naval Academy in 1964. He worked as a branch officer and division supervisor in various ships of the Turkish Naval Forces. He studied at the Naval War Academy between 1975 and 1977.

Between 1986 and 1989, after being the Directorate of the Naval Forces Department of Plan Organization Planning Branch, in 1989–1990, he was the Chief of Staff of the Turkish War Fleet Command and then II. He served as Commodore for Destroyer Flotilla and Head of Operations at the Naval Command.

He was promoted to the rank of Rear Admiral in 1992. In this position, he served as the Naval Academy Command, as the Head of the Plan Principles of NAVSOUTH NATO Headquarters in Naples and the Commander of the Dardanelles Strait. He was promoted to the rank of Rear Admiral in 1997. In this role, he served as Naval Forces Logistics Directorate, Mine Fleet Command and Naval Forces Inspection and Evaluation Head. He was promoted to the rank of Vice Admiral in 2002. In this position, following his duty as Naval Forces Inspection and Evaluation Head, he served as Chief of Staff of the Naval Forces and Command of the Northern Sea Area.

In 2007, he was promoted to the rank of Admiral and was appointed Naval Command. He was appointed as the Naval Forces Commander on 26 August 2009.

Due to the arrest of high-ranking soldiers on 29 July 2011, Chief of General Staff Gen. Işık Koşaner resigned from his duty together with Land Forces Commander Gen. Erdal Ceylanoğlu and Air Force Commander Gen. Hasan Aksay and asked for retirement. He was retired with other commanders the same day.

He is married with two children.

Preceded by Metin Ataç	Commanders of the Turkish Naval Forces; 30 August 2009 – 20 July 2011	Succeeded by Emin Murat Bilgel
