= Turan Güneş =

Turkish academic and politician (1921–1982)

Deputy Prime Minister and Minister of State
- In office 21 June 1977 – 27 July 1977
- President: Fahri Korutürk
- Prime Minister: Bülent Ecevit

Minister of Foreign Affairs
- In office 1974–1974
- Prime Minister: Bülent Ecevit

Personal details
- Born: 25 June 1921 Kandıra, Ottoman Empire
- Died: 9 April 1982 (aged 60) Çanakkale, Turkey
- Resting place: Zincirlikuyu Cemetery, Istanbul
- Party: Democrat Party; Liberty Party; Republican People's Party
- Spouse: Nermin Güneş
- Children: 2
- Education: Galatasaray High School
- Alma mater: Istanbul University; University of Paris

Turan Güneş (25 June 1921 – 9 April 1982) was a Turkish academic and politician who served as the minister of foreign affairs and deputy prime minister in the 1970s. He started his political career in the Democrat Party (DP), but soon he joined the Republican People's Party (CHP).

== Early life and education ==
Güneş was born in Kandıra, Kocaeli, on 25 June 1921. He graduated from Galatasaray High School in 1941. He received a bachelor's degree in law from Istanbul University and also, obtained his PhD in political science from the University of Paris. In 1947 he joined the Democrat Party.

== Career ==
Following his graduation Güneş began to work at the law faculty of Istanbul University and became an associate professor in 1954. The same year he ran for a seat from Kocaeli and won the election becoming a member of the parliament for the DP. However, he was expelled from the party along with others in 1955. Then he contributed to the establishment of the Liberty Party which joined the CHP in 1958. Güneş also became a member of the CHP in 1959 and was elected to the CHP's council in the 14th congress on 12 January 1959. During this period he was one of the contributors of the Forum magazine.

Following the military coup on 27 May 1960 Güneş was appointed to the Constitutional Commission which was established by the Constituent Assembly in January 1961. The commission was headed by Turhan Feyzioğlu and Enver Ziya Karal and drafted a new constitution. From 1961 to 1972 Güneş taught at the Ankara University's Faculty of Political Sciences, and became a professor of administrative law in 1965. He was a contributor of the Yön magazine during this period, but he left the magazine when it began to support a dictatorial regime.

Güneş was again elected as a member of the CHP's council in October 1964 and was part of the left of center group. He served as the deputy general secretary of the CHP between 1969 and 1972. He won a seat from Kocaeli in the general election in 1973. In the 23rd ordinary party congress on 1976 he ran for the secretary general of the CHP along with Orhan Eyüpoğlu and Deniz Baykal. He and Baykal lost the election, and Eyüpoğlu remained the secretary general of the party.

Güneş was appointed minister of foreign affairs in 1974 in the coalition cabinet led by Prime Minister Bülent Ecevit. Although his term was short, it witnessed a significant event, namely Turkey's military intervention in Cyprus. Güneş was again elected to the parliament from Kocaeli in the 1977 general election. He was named as the deputy prime minister and minister of state in the cabinet headed by Bülent Ecevit on 21 June 1977. The cabinet could not get a vote of confidence in Parliament on 3 July, and Güneş's term as deputy prime minister and minister of state ended on 27 July.

== Personal life and death ==
Güneş was married to Nermin Güneş who was a French language teacher. She died in Ankara on 28 July 2021 at age 95. They had two children: Ayşe and Hurşit Güneş who are both academics.

Turan Güneş died in Çanakkale on 9 April 1982 due to cardiac arrest while traveling from Istanbul to Izmir on a ship. He was buried in Zincirlikuyu Cemetery in Istanbul.
