= Erdil =

Erdil is a Turkish surname of Turkish and Persian origin. Notable people with the surname include:

- İlhami Erdil (1938–2023), Turkish admiral
- Lena Erdil (born 1989), Turkish-German professional windsurfer
