= Göksun (disambiguation) =

Göksun may refer to:

- Göksun, a Turkish given name.
- Göksun, is a town and district of Kahramanmaraş Province in the Mediterranean region of Turkey.
