= Zergün Korutürk =

Turkish diplomat

Turkey Ambassador to Sweden
- In office November 2009 – 2013
- President: Abdullah Gül
- Preceded by: Necip Egüz
- Succeeded by: Ömer Kaya Türkmen

Turkey Ambassador to Portugal
- In office 15 May 2002 – 15 January 2007
- President: Ahmet Necdet Sezer
- Preceded by: Halil Suha Noyan
- Succeeded by: Kaya Türkmen

Personal details
- Born: 1948 (age 77–78) Ankara, Turkey
- Education: Autonomous University of Madrid
- Profession: Diplomat

Zergün Korutürk (born 1948) is a Turkish diplomat who served as Turkish Ambassador to Sweden and Portugal.

== Personal life ==
She completed her secondary education at Kent College in Tunbridge Wells in the United Kingdom, and then graduated from the Autonomous University of Madrid in Spain. She was later trained in the Escuela Diplomática of Spain.

She is the daughter-in-law of former President of Turkey Fahri Korutürk (in office 1973 to 1980) and Emel Korutürk through her marriage to diplomat Hüseyin Selah Korutürk. The couple has two children.

== Career ==
She entered the service of the Ministry of Foreign Affairs in 1977. Between 1979 and 1984, she served in diplomatic missions in Washington, D.C., and Moscow. After two years of work in the Department for Multilateral Political Affair in the Ministry, she was appointed in 1986 First Secretary and Counselor at the Permanent Mission of Turkey to the OECD in Paris, where sh was until 1990. Returned home, she worked in the Department for International Organizations and Department for CSCE Humanitarian Affairs between 1990 and 1993. After one year of a service as an advisor to the Deputy Prime Minister for Foreign Policy, she was assigned to the Turkish Embassy in Lisbon, Portugal as a Counselor serving until 1997. Back at the Ministry, Korutürk worked as head in the departments for America, Pacific and the East, Human Rights Commission and Court. In 1999, she was promoted to Minister Plenipotentiary, Deputy Director General of the departments for the Central Europe and the Baltics, and then for European Union (EU) Political Affairs.

On 15 May 2002, Korutürk took office as Ambassador of Turkey to Portugal, where she served until 15 January 2007. Returned home, she became Senior Advisor for Foreign Policy to the Prime Minister and the President, and then in April 2008, she was promoted to Deputy Undersecretary in the Ministry responsible for EU and European Affairs. In November 2009, Korutürk was appointed Ambassador of Turkey to Sweden, serving there until 2013. During her term in Stockholm, she was temporarily recalled by the Turkish Government in March 2010 in protest of an Armenian resolution of the Swedish Parliament.

Apart from her diplomatic works, she was a lecturer at many universities like New York University, Harvard University, and McGill University. She was also delivered lectures on European Union–Turkey relations in Portuguese think tanks.
