= Ahmet Zeki Özak =

Turkish admiral (1900–1982)

- Born: 1900; Istanbul, Turkey
- Died: 1982 (aged 81–82)
- Education: Turkish Naval Academy
- Military career
- Allegiance: Turkey
- Branch: Turkish Naval Forces
- Service years: 1923–1961
- Rank: Admiral
- Commands: Commander of the Turkish Naval Forces

Ahmet Zeki Özak (1900 – 1982) was an admiral in the Turkish Naval Forces who served as the 4th commander of the Turkish Naval Forces 20 June 1960 to 20 June 1961. He was promoted to the rank of rear admiral in 1950 and full rear admiral in 1953. He was promoted to the rank of vice admiral in 1955.

== Biography ==
Özak was born in Istanbul in 1900. He graduated from the Turkish Naval Academy as an ensign in 1923 and from Naval War College in 1936 where he was granted as a staff officer.

He became executive officer of Ottoman cruiser Mecidiye. As a vice admiral, he served as deputy chief of Operations Naval Command and War Fleet, in addition to serving as chief of Istanbul Naval Command, and assistant chief of Straits and Marmara Sea Command and Staff Naval Forces.

He was appointed as deputy chief of Naval Forces on 21 June 1960. He retired from the armed forces voluntarily. Following by the resolution adopted by the Council of State, he was promoted to the rank of admiral on 30 August 1968.
