= Gökçen Fırat =

Turkish military officer

- Born: 22 June 1977 (age 48); Istanbul, Turkey
- Allegiance: Turkey
- Branch: Turkish Naval Forces
- Service years: 1998–present
- Rank: Rear admiral

Gökçen Fırat (born 22 June 1977) is a Turkish military officer. She is the first female admiral in the history of the Republic of Turkey and the first female ship commander in the country.

== Early life and military career ==
Gökçen Fırat was born on 22 June 1977 in Istanbul. She graduated from the Turkish Naval Academy in 1998 and served on the frigate TCG Yavuz. Later, she became Turkey's first female ship commander by leading the training ship TCG Training Boat-2.

Fırat worked in various staff positions in the Turkish Naval Forces, General Staff, and Ministry of National Defense. After completing staff officer training, she served in NATO missions in Norway and the United Kingdom. In 2023, she was promoted to rear admiral and appointed Head of Defense Planning and Project Management.
