= Gökçen =

- Gender: Masculine, feminine
- Language: Turkish

Origin
- Language: Turkic
- Meaning: "beautiful woman", "blue-eyed woman"
- Region of origin: Central Asia, from the religion of Tengrism

Other names
- Related names: Gökçe

Gökçen is a Turkish given name which means "beautiful woman", "blue-eyed woman", or "belonging to the sky", and may refer to:

== Given names ==
- Gökçen Denkel (born 1985), Turkish female volleyball player
- Gökçen Efe (1881–1919), Turkish folk hero
- Gökçen Fırat (born 1977), Turkish military officer

== Surname ==
- Kemalettin Sami Gökçen (1884–1934), officer of the Ottoman Army and general of the Turkish Army
- Sabiha Gökçen (1913–2001), Turkish female aviator

== Place ==
- Gökçen, İzmir, a town in İzmir Province
- Gökçen, Kocaköy

== See also ==
- Sabiha Gökçen International Airport, an airport in Istanbul
