= Göksu (name) =

- Gender: Unisex
- Language: Turkish

Origin
- Language: Turkic

Other names
- Related names: Göksun

Göksu is an unisex Turkish given name. In Turkish, it means "sky water" or "celestial water".

== People ==
=== Given name ===
- Göksu Türkdoğan (born 1985), Turkish footballer
- Göksu Üçtaş Şanlı (born 1990), Turkish artistic gymnast

=== Surname ===
- Serkan Göksu (born 1993), Turkish footballer
- Yaşam Göksu (born 1995), Turkish footballer

== See also ==
- Göksu (disambiguation)
