= Gökçe (disambiguation) =

Gökçe is a Turkish given name or surname.

Gökçe may refer to:

- Beyşehir bleak, an extinct species of freshwater fish, also known as Gökçe balığı ("Gökçe fish")
- Gökçe, Aksaray, a village in the district of Aksaray, Aksaray Province, Turkey
- Gökçe, Ardanuç, a village in the district of Ardanuç, Artvin Province, Turkey
- Gökçe, Düzce
- Gökçe, Elâzığ
- Gökçe, Gercüş, a village in the district of Gercüş, Batman Province, Turkey
- Gökçe, Kahta, a village in the district of Kahta, Adıyaman Province, Turkey
- Gökçe, Mardin, a town in the district of Kızıltepe, Mardin Province, Turkey
- Gökçe Dam, dam in Turkey
- Gökçe Hatun, fictional character in the Turkish TV series Diriliş: Ertuğrul
- Gökçe, Tercan

== See also ==
- , since this is a common prefix
