= Forum (Turkish magazine) =

Biweekly political magazine in Turkey (1954–1960)

- Categories: Political magazine; Arts magazine
- Frequency: Biweekly
- Founder: Aydın Yalçın; Nilüfer Yalçın
- Founded: 1954
- First issue: 1 April 1954
- Final issue: 28 April 1970
- Country: Turkey
- Based in: Ankara
- Language: Turkish

Forum was a biweekly political and cultural magazine which was published in Ankara, Turkey, between 1954 and 1970. The magazine is known for its opposition to the Democrat Party (DP) and its leading contributors. Its title was a reflection of its intend to be a publication for open debate about politics and culture.

== History and profile ==
Forum was started in 1954, and its first issue appeared on 1 April that year. In the inaugural issue the magazine described its goal as "to help enlighten the people by confronting different opinions." Its founders were Aydın Yalçın ve Nilüfer Yalçın. The latter was also the first editor-in-chief and owner of the magazine which came out biweekly. The magazine was later owned by different individuals, including Metin And, Osman Okyar, Fikret Ekinci ve Asime Korkmazgil. The members of its editorial board were mostly intellectuals and academics. It was headquartered in Ankara. The magazine had a 24-page format, but some issues had 32 pages.

Forum was one of the supporters of the Liberty Party which was established by the former members of the DP in 1955. Over time the magazine's opposition to the ruling DP increased, and it was closed down by the DP government on 15 April 1960. Forum resumed its publication only after the military coup of 27 May 1960. In the first issue after the ban dated 1 June the magazine praised the military coup which ended the DP's rule and described it as the most gentleman coup d'état. In the post-coup period Forum supported the formation of a social-democratic coalition consisting of industrialists, civil servants, workers, and poor peasants against the populist coalition of peasants and merchants which had been established during the DP rule. The magazine also supported the view that the new constitution should normalize the political arena in Turkey which had been destabilized by the DP government.

Forum had a liberal stance in the 1950s and advocated Western-type, Keynesian liberal democracy as well as liberal principles such as freedom of thought and the free press. It also supported a liberal economic approach, including interventionist and non-interventionist approaches to the national market. It adopted a socialist political stance in the late 1960s.

In addition to articles by Turkish contributors, Forum contained Turkish translations of the articles on political and economic topics from foreign newspapers and journals, including The Economist, New York Herald Tribune and The Times. These articles were featured in a section entitled "Ne Diyorlar?" (Turkish: What Are They Saying?). Forum also featured articles on arts and on rural settlements.

Throughout its run Forum published two special issues. One of them was entitled "Injustice to Teachers" dated 15 December 1967, and the other one was entitled "The Eastern Region" dated 15 January 1968.

Forum folded on 15 October 1969. It was restarted in February 1970, but permanently ceased publication on 28 April 1970 after producing a total of 379 issues.

== Contributors ==
Most of the Forum contributors were political scientists and legal academics from Ankara University and Istanbul University, including Bahri Savcı, Osman Okyar, Bedii Feyzioğlu, Turhan Feyzioğlu, Turan Güneş, and Kemal Salih. In addition, various leading academics and political figures from different orientations published articles in the magazine: Sadun Aren, Aziz Nesin, Doğan Avcıoğlu, Muammer Aksoy, İlhan Arsel, Şerif Mardin, Bülent Ecevit, Cevat Çapan, Orhan Asena, Cahit Talas, Mümtaz Soysal, Yakup Kepenek, Münci Kapani, Coşkun Kırca ve Fahir Armaoğlu. Of them Şerif Mardin, Bülent Ecevit, Turhan Feyzioğlu and Attilâ İlhan also shaped the ideological framework of Forum. In the 1960s the magazine featured articles by Ahmet N. Yücekök, İsmail Beşikçi, Behice Boran, Mehmet Ali Aybar and Hüseyin Korkmazgil.

Bilge Karasu was a regular contributor of Forum between its start in 1954 to 1959. His articles were about art criticism. The other Forum contributors whose articles were on music, literature, theatre, and plastic arts included İlhan Mimaroğlu, Bedii Sevin, Turgut Uyar, Güner Sümer, Hüseyin Cöntürk, Metin And, Gültekin Oransay, and Kaya Özsezgin.

== Legacy ==
Issues of Forum were archived by TUSTAV.
