= List of commandants of the Turkish Coast Guard =

Commander of the Turkish Coast Guard
- Türk Sahil Güvenlik Komutanlığı
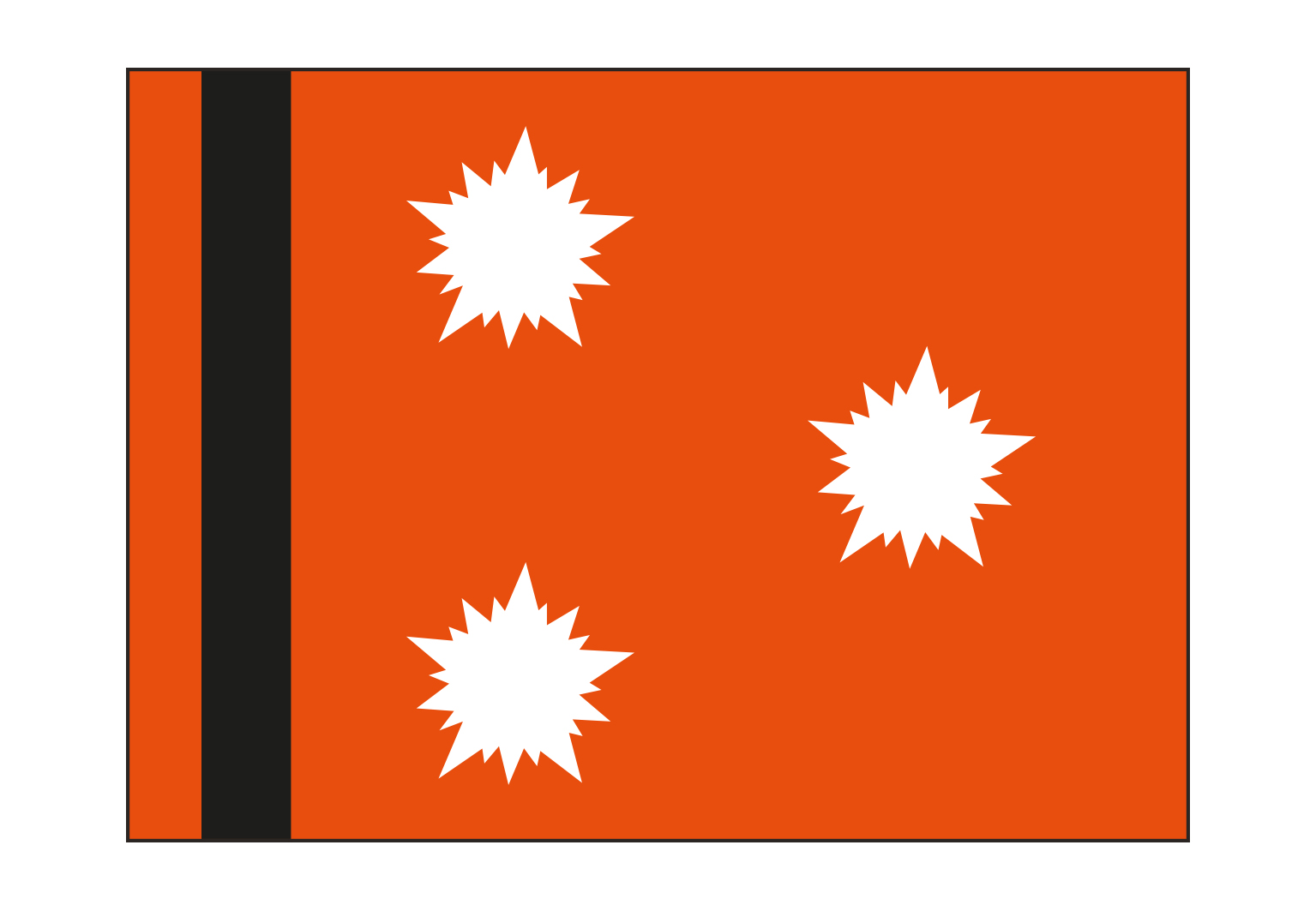
- Flag of Turkish Coast Guard Commander
- Incumbent; Vice admiral Ahmet Kendir since 12 August 2018
- Ministry of the Interior
- Member of: Turkish Coast Guard
- Reports to: Minister of the Interior
- Formation: 24 August 1982
- First holder: Mustafa Turunçoğlu

This list includes commandants of the Turkish Coast Guard (Turkish: Türk Sahil Güvenlik Komutanlığı), who have served as nominal heads of the Turkish Coast Guard.

The current Commandant of the Turkish Coast Guard is Rear Admiral Ahmet Kendir, since 12 August 2018.

No.	Commandant	Picture	Took office	Left office
1	Rear admiral Mustafa Turunçoğlu		24 August 1982	16 August 1984
2	Rear admiral İlhan Aran		13 August 1984	13 August 1986
3	Rear admiral Çetin Ersarı		13 August 1986	12 August 1988
4	Rear admiral Aydan Erol		12 August 1988	13 August 1990
5	Rear admiral Ekmel Totrakan		13 August 1990	14 August 1992
6	Rear admiral Niyazi Ulusoy		14 August 1992	10 August 1994
7	Rear admiral Aydın Canel		10 August 1994	14 August 1996
8	Rear admiral Alper Çetin Tezeren		14 August 1996	19 August 1998
9	Rear admiral Yalçın Ertuna		14 August 1998	14 August 2002
10	Rear admiral Engin Heper		14 August 2002	12 August 2005
11	Rear admiral Can Erenoğlu		12 August 2005	12 August 2008
12	Rear admiral Atilla Kezek		12 August 2008	12 August 2009
13	Rear admiral İzzet Artunç		12 August 2009	10 August 2011
14	Rear admiral Serdar Dülger		10 August 2011	2 August 2012
15	Rear admiral Hasan Uşaklıoğlu		2 August 2012	12 August 2013
16	Rear admiral Adnan Özbal		12 August 2013	12 August 2014
17	Rear admiral Hakan Üstem		12 August 2014	16 July 2016
	Rear admiral Bülent Olcay (Acting)		16 July 2016	12 August 2018
18	Vice admiral Ahmet Kendir		12 August 2018	Incumbent

== See also ==
- List of chiefs of the Turkish General Staff
- List of commanders of the Turkish Land Forces
- List of commanders of the Turkish Air Force
- List of commanders of the Turkish Naval Forces
- List of general commanders of the Turkish Gendarmerie
