= Emin Murat Bilgel =

Turkish admiral

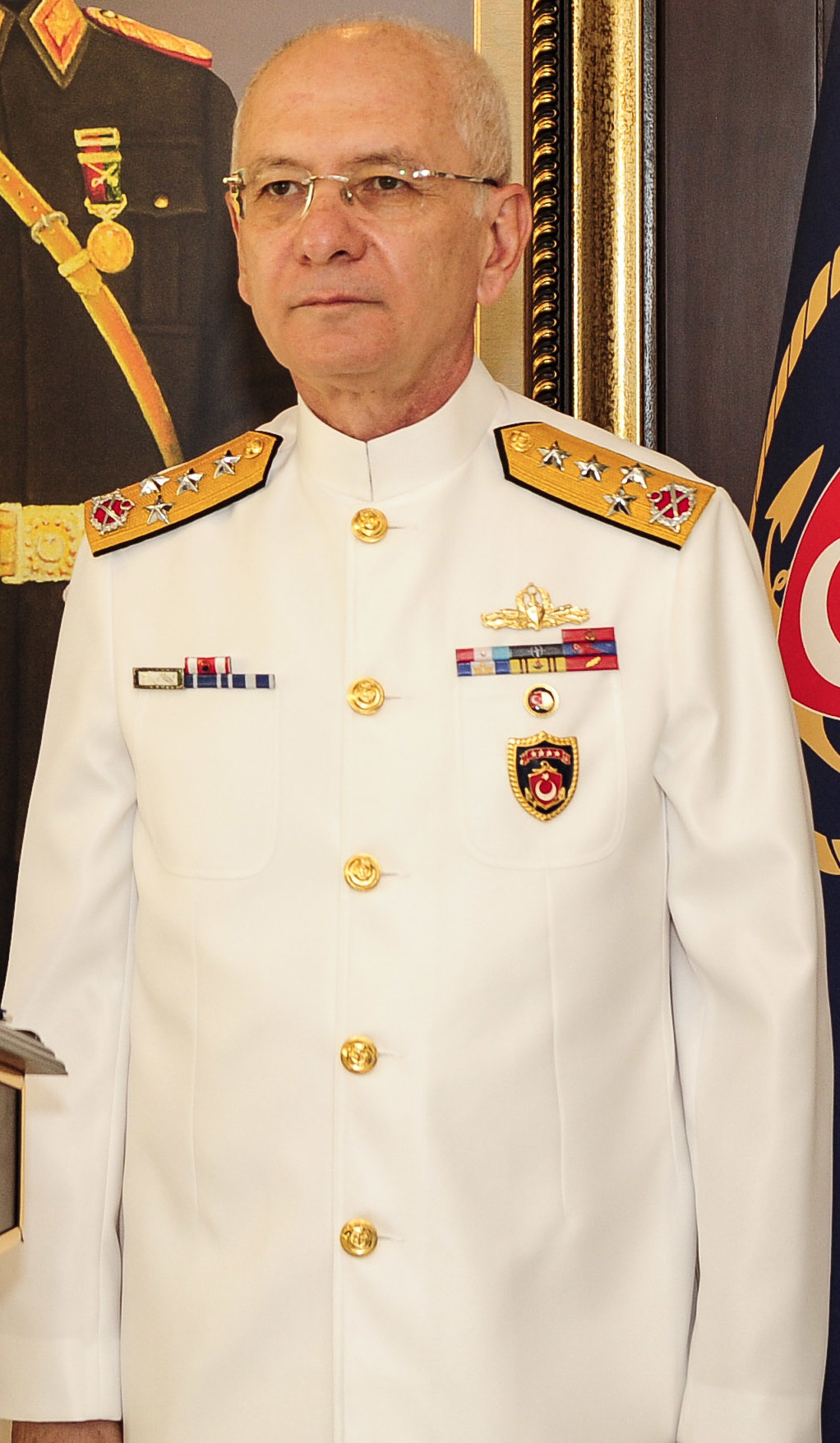
- Military career
- Allegiance: Turkey
- Branch: Turkish Navy
- Service years: 1973 – 2013
- Rank: Commander of the Turkish Naval Forces

Emin Murat Bilgel (born 1952) is a Turkish admiral who served as the Commander of the Turkish Naval Forces from 2011 to 2013. He visited India in November 2012 and Pakistan in March 2013, at which visit he was awarded the Sitara-i-Imtiaz.

Preceded by Eşref Uğur Yiğit	Commander-in-Chief of the Turkish Navy; 4 August 2011 – 23 August 2013	Succeeded by Bülent Bostanoğlu
