= Yener Karahanoğlu =

Turkish admiral

- Born: 1946 (age 79–80); Erzurum, Turkey
- Military career
- Allegiance: Turkey
- Branch: Turkish Naval Forces
- Service years: 1959-2005
- Rank: Admiral
- Commands: Commander of Naval Forces
- Awards: TAF Medal of Honor; TAF Medal of Distinguished Courage and Self-Sacrifice; TAF Medal of Distinguished Service

Admiral Yener Karahanoğlu (1946, Erzurum) is a high-ranking Turkish naval officer and the 21st Commander of the Turkish Navy.

== Career ==
He enrolled in the Naval High School in 1959 and graduated from the Naval Academy in 1964 as an ensign. Upon completion of his education and joining the Turkish Fleet in 1966, he served as branch officer, department head and executive officer in various destroyers. Karahanoğlu graduated from the Naval War College in 1978 and from the Armed Forces Staff College in 1984. He commanded the patrol ship, TCG Yarhisar, and the destroyer, TCG Kılıçalipaşa, between 1979-1982 and the First Destroyer Squadron in 1989-1990.

Karahanoğlu assumed various staff duties at the headquarters of the Turkish Amphibious Group Command, Turkish Fleet Command and Turkish Naval Forces Command (TNFC). He served as the chief of Operations Intelligence and Communications Section in the Turkish Amphibious Group Command HQ, as the chief of Operations and Training Section, and the head of Operations Directorate at the Turkish Fleet Command HQ from 1982 to 1986, and as COMEDNOREAST Administration Officer, the chief of Operations Section and the head of Command and Control Branch at the TNFC HQ between 1986 and 1989.

Karahanoğlu was promoted to rear admiral (LH) on 30 August 1990 and fulfilled his duties as the head of the Operational Training Branch from 1990 to 1993 at the TNFC HQ and as the commander of the Amphibious Ships between 1993 and 1994.

After being promoted to rear admiral (UH) in August 1994, Karahanoğlu served as the head of the Logistics Directorate (TNFC HQ), and the commander of the Surface Action Group for two years each successively.

In August 1998, he was promoted to vice admiral and assigned as the head of the Inspection and Evaluation Directorate at TNFC HQ until August 1999. He then subsequently served as the chief of staff of TNFC between 1999 and 2001 and the commander of Southern Sea Area Command from 2001 to 2003.

Karahanoğlu was promoted to admiral in 2003 and assigned as the commander of the Turkish Fleet between 2003 and 2005. He became the commander of the Turkish Naval Forces on 26 August 2005.

He is decorated with the "Distinguished Service Medal of the Turkish Armed Forces" and the "Medal of Honor of the Turkish Armed Forces".

Yener Karahanoğlu is married to Aytaç Karahanoğlu and has a son and a daughter.

Preceded by Ozden Ornek	Commander-in-Chief of the Turkish Navy; 26 August 2005 – August 24, 2007	Succeeded by Metin Ataç
