= Gökçen Denkel =

Turkish volleyball player (born 1985)

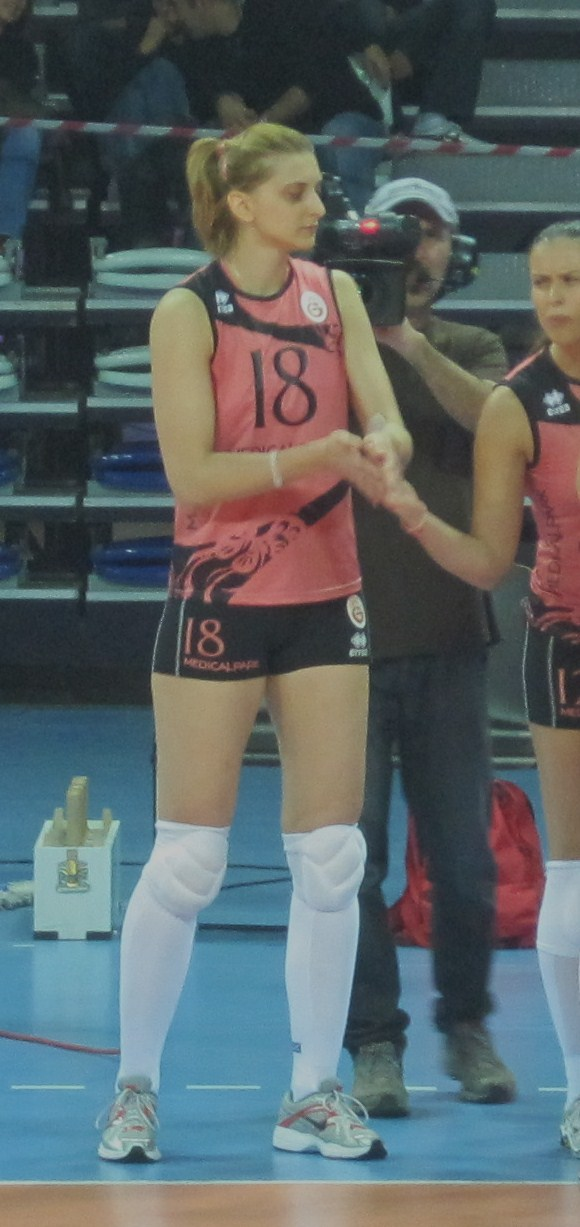

Personal information
- Full name: Ayşe Gökçen Denkel Zop
- Born: 2 August 1985 (age 41); Istanbul, Turkey
- Height: 1.93 m (6 ft 4 in)

Volleyball information
- Position: Middle Blocker
- Current club: Nilüfer Belediyespor
- Number: -

Career
Years	Teams
1994-2010; 2010-12; 2012-15	Eczacıbaşı VitrA; Galatasaray Medical Park; Fenerbahçe
Medal record
Women's volleyball
Representing Turkey
Mediterranean Games
Silver medal – second place	2009 Pescara	Team

Ayşe Gökçen Denkel (born 2 August 1985, in Istanbul) is a Turkish volleyball player. She is 193 cm tall and plays as a middle blocker.

Gökçen Denkel plays for Nilüfer Belediyespor. She has played for Eczacıbaşı VitrA from the age of 11 at both youth and senior level and also played for G.S. Medical Park and Fenerbahçe.

== Awards ==
=== Club ===
- 2011–12 Turkish Cup – Runner-up, with Galatasaray Daikin
- 2011–12 CEV Cup – Runner-up, with Galatasaray Daikin
- 2012–13 CEV Cup – Runner-up, with Fenerbahçe
- 2013–14 CEV Cup – Champion, with Fenerbahçe
- 2014–15 Turkish Women's Volleyball League – Champion, with Fenerbahçe Grundig

== See also ==
- Turkish women in sports
