= Göksu (disambiguation) =

Göksu is a river in Mersin Province, Turkey.

- Göksu (name), unisex given name

Göksu may also refer to:

- Göksu, Bismil
- Göksu, Karayazı
- Göksu, Mersin, a town in Mersin Province, Turkey
- Göksu Dam, a dam in Diyarbakır Province, Turkey
- Göksu Park, a public park in Ankara, Turkey
- Göksu Waterfall, a waterfall on Göksu river in Kayseri Province, Turkey
