= Ilhami Erdil =

Turkish admiral (1938–2023)

- Born: July 16, 1938
- Died: July 5, 2023 (aged 84)
- Education: Turkish Naval Academy
- Military career
- Allegiance: Turkey
- Branch: Turkish Naval Forces
- Service years: 1953–2001
- Rank: Admiral
- Commands: Commander of the Turkish Naval Forces
- Conflicts: World War II

Ilhami Erdil (July 16, 1938 – July 5, 2023) was a Turkish admiral who served as the 18th commander of the Turkish Naval Forces from 26 August 1999 to 24 August 2001. He also served as the NATO planning officer and Planning Organization Department between 1975 and 1977 and naval attaché in Washington, D.C. between 1979 and 1981.

Erdil was promoted to the rank of rear admiral in 1987, vice admiral on 30 August 1992, and a four-star admiral on 30 August 1997 until he retired from the service on 24 August 2001.

== Biography ==
Erdil received his early schooling in Heybeliada. He joined the Naval High School in 1953 and obtained his graduation from the Turkish Naval Academy in 1958. He initially served as power station, wound defense, combat, navigation and operations officer at various ships, and enrolled at the Naval War College and the Turkish Armed Forces Academy between 1968 and 1971.

His staff assignments includes TCG Gemlik II, TCG Istanbul, and War Fleet Operations, manager. He later went to the US and enrolled in the Naval War College between 1977 and 1978.

During the World War II he commanded Assault Boat Flotilla and 1st Destroyer Flotilla. Upon his promotion to the rank of rear admiral, he was appointed as the chief of the General Staff Intelligence Department and the Turkish Naval command stationed near the Black Sea.

He served as mine squadron commander between 1988 and 1990 and the chief of Naval Operations from 1990 to 1992. Upon his promotion to the rank of vice admiral he commanded Naval Training Command between 1992 and 1993. He later became chief of staff of the Turkish Armed Forces for the Northern Sea Area Command from 1995 to 1997.

== Controversies ==
Erdil faced charges in 2004 for his role in corruption and misuse of power. He was later sentenced to 30 months in prison.
