= Kemal Kayacan =

Turkish admiral

Commander of the Turkish Naval Forces
- In office 30 August 1972 – 23 August 1974
- Preceded by: Celal Eyiceoğlu
- Succeeded by: Hilmi Fırat

Personal details
- Born: 1915 Sinop, Kastamonu Vilayet, Ottoman Empire
- Died: 29 July 1992 (aged 76–77)

Military service
- Allegiance: Turkey
- Branch/service: Turkish Naval Forces
- Years of service: 1935 - 1974
- Rank: 4-Star Admiral

Kemal Kayacan (1915, Sinop, Kastamonu Vilayet - 29 July 1992, Kadıköy) was a Turkish admiral. He was Commander of the Turkish Naval Forces from 1972 to 1974. He was elected to the Grand National Assembly of Turkey at the 1977 Turkish general election, serving until 1980.

He was assassinated at his home in 1992.

He was a graduate of the Turkish Naval High School.
