= USS Clarence K. Bronson =

Fletcher-class destroyer

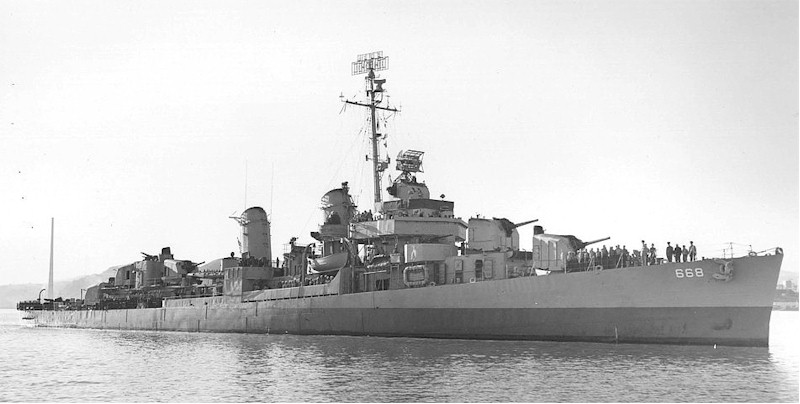
- USS Clarence K. Bronson (DD-668), off Mare Island, 15 June 1945.

History

United States
- Namesake: Clarence K. Bronson
- Builder: Federal Shipbuilding and Drydock Company, Kearny, New Jersey
- Laid down: 9 December 1942
- Launched: 18 April 1943
- Commissioned: 11 June 1943
- Decommissioned: 29 June 1960
- Stricken: 1 February 1973
- Fate: Transferred to Turkey, 14 January 1967

Turkey
- Name: İstanbul (D 340)
- Namesake: Istanbul
- Acquired: 14 January 1967
- Stricken: 1987
- Fate: Scrapped, 1987

General characteristics
- Class & type: Fletcher-class destroyer
- Displacement: 2,050 tons
- Length: 376 ft 6 in (114.7 m)
- Beam: 39 ft 8 in (12.1 m)
- Draft: 17 ft 9 in (5.4 m)
- Propulsion: 60,000 shp (45 MW); 2 propellers
- Speed: 35 knots (65 km/h; 40 mph)
- Range: 6500 nmi. (12,000 km); at 15 kt
- Complement: 319
- Armament: 5 × 5 in (130 mm)/38 guns, 14 × 40 mm AA guns, 12 × 20 mm AA guns, 5 × 21 inch (533 mm) torpedo tubes, 6 × depth charge projectors, 2 × depth charge tracks

USS Clarence K. Bronson (DD-668) was a Fletcher-class destroyer of the United States Navy.

== Namesake ==
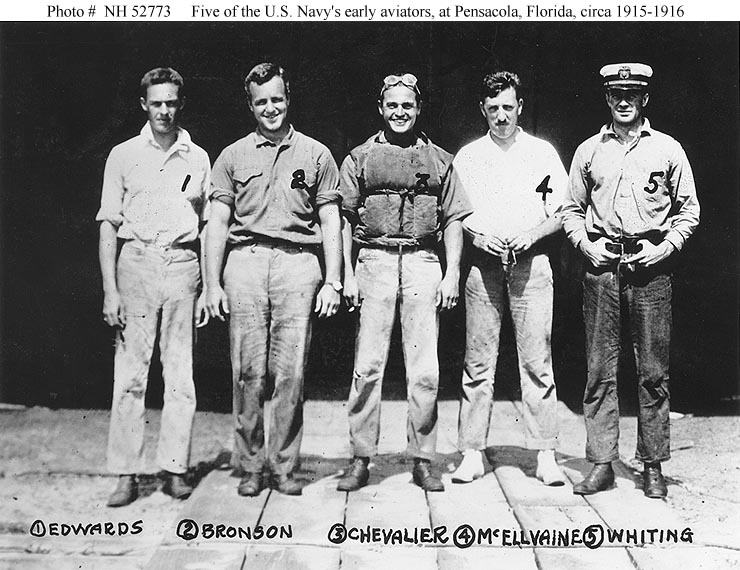
Lt. (j.g.) Clarence K. Bronson second from left

Clarence K. Bronson was born on 21 July 1888 in Bushnell, Illinois. He was a member of the United States Naval Academy Class of 1910. After service afloat, he was trained in aviation in 1914 at the Curtiss Aeroplane Company in Hammondsport, New York, and at Naval Air Station Pensacola. Lieutenant (junior grade) Bronson was killed at the Naval Proving Ground Indianhead, Indian Head, Maryland, on 8 November 1916, while testing experimental aerial bombs.

== Construction and commissioning ==
Clarence K. Bronson was launched 18 April 1943 by the Federal Shipbuilding and Dry Dock Co., Kearny, N.J., sponsored by Mrs. W. P. Richardson; and commissioned 11 June 1943.

== World War II ==
Clarence K. Bronson reached Pearl Harbor 21 November 1943 for final training, remaining in Hawaiian waters aside from a single escort voyage to Tarawa, until January 1944, when she joined the Fast Carrier Task Force (then 5th Fleet's TF 58). Bronson screened this force for strikes supporting the landings on Kwajalein, and raids on Truk, Saipan, and Guam through February, and on 15 March, sailed from Espiritu Santo to screen aircraft carriers covering the landings in the Bismarck Archipelago from 19 to 25 March. With Task Group 36.1 (TG 36.1) she rejoined TF 58 two days later for strikes on Palau, Yap, and Woleai.

In late April 1944, Bronson's force covered the New Guinea landings, and returned to raid Truk on 29 and 30 April. The destroyer was drydocked at Majuro during May, and sailed again with TF 58 on 6 June for the Marianas operation. After screening during preinvasion air strikes on Saipan, Rota, Tinian and Guam, Bronson stood off Saipan as the assault on that island began, then guarded her carriers as they launched their planes in the aerial Battle of the Philippine Sea, 19 and 20 June, an American victory from which Japanese naval aviation never recovered. Clarence K. Bronson was one of the ships which displayed her searchlight aloft as a homing beacon for carrier pilots at the close of the battle as the Fleet audaciously revealed itself to save its aviators. After replenishing at Eniwetok early in July, TF 58 covered the invasion of Guam, and launched air strikes on enemy bases in the Palaus and Bonins.

Clarence K. Bronson's force covered the capture of the Palaus in September 1944 and in October neutralized Formosan bases, hurled raids against the Philippines and Visayas, and played its part in the epic Battle for Leyte Gulf of 23 to 26 October, in the Battle off Cape Engaño, 25 October.

In November and December 1944, air strikes covered the Mindoro landings, and through January 1945, raids on Japanese bases on Formosa, Luzon, the Nansei Shoto and Chinese ports made possible the Lingayen assault. February's strikes on Tokyo prepared for the assault on Iwo Jima, and Clarence K. Bronson left the main body of her task force 18 February to escort cruisers to Iwo Jima for preinvasion bombardment and fire support to the forces ashore after the assault on 19 February. She offered this aid for 4 days, then rejoined her task force for another round of strikes on Tokyo and the Nansei Shoto. She returned to fire support and antisubmarine patrol duties off Iwo Jima from 3 to 29 March, then sailed for a west coast overhaul.

Clarence K. Bronson returned to Pearl Harbor 9 July 1945 for training, and put to sea 2 August to bombard Wake Island 6 days later. Continuing west, she entered Sagami Wan 27 August, and took part in the occupation by patrolling Japanese waters until 5 December. Homeward bound, she called at San Diego and New York City, and on 12 April arrived at Charleston, S.C. Here she was decommissioned and placed in reserve 16 July 1946.

== 1951–1960 ==
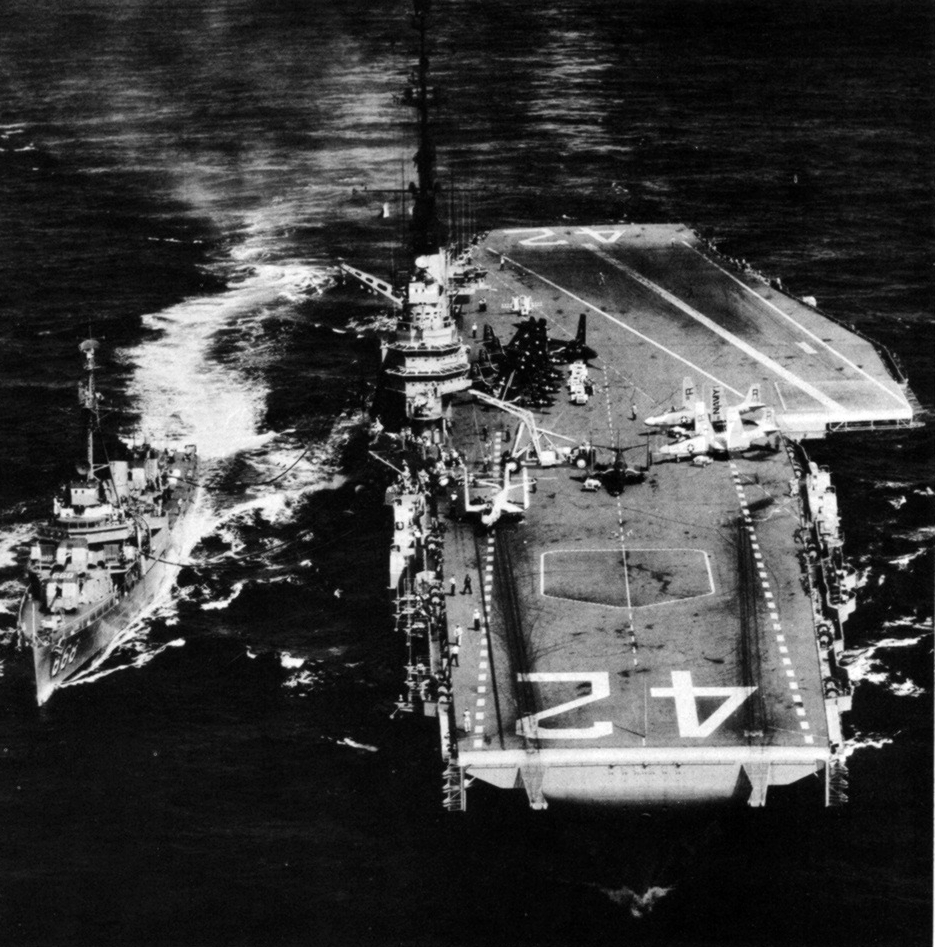
Clarence K. Bronson refueling from USS Franklin D. Roosevelt (CVA-42), 1956.

Recommissioned 7 June 1951, Clarence K. Bronson had training along the east coast and in the Caribbean until 18 May 1953, when she sailed from her home port, Newport, R.I., to join TF 77 in Korean waters 3 July. She operated with TF 77 and TF 99 on blockade, patrol, and escort duty until 10 November, when she began the final leg of her round-the-world cruise, calling at Hong Kong, Aden, Gibraltar, Bermuda, and many other ports before she stood up Narragansett Bay 15 January 1954. Through the next 4 years, she alternated training and local operations with exercises in the Caribbean, NATO operations in the North Atlantic, assignment as engineering school ship, and two Mediterranean cruises with the 6th Fleet in 1955 and 1957.

In 1958 Clarence K. Bronson was assigned to experimental duty with the Underwater Sound Laboratory, and in 1959, made naval reserve training cruises along the east coast and in the Caribbean from Charleston, and her new home port, Mayport, Fla. On 11 April 1960, she was placed in commission in reserve at Orange, Texas, and on 29 June 1960 was decommissioned.

== TCG İstanbul (D 340) ==
Clarence K. Bronson was transferred to Turkey 14 January 1967, served in the Turkish Navy as TCG İstanbul (D 340), after the city of Istanbul.

She was stricken and broken up for scrap in 1987.

== Awards ==
- Asiatic-Pacific Campaign Medal with nine battle stars
- World War II Victory Medal
- Navy Occupation Medal with "ASIA" clasp
- National Defense Service Medal
- Korean Service Medal with one battle star
- Philippine Presidential Unit Citation
- Korean Presidential Unit Citation
- Philippine Liberation Medal with two stars
- United Nations Korea Medal
- Korean War Service Medal
