= Osman Korutürk =

Turkish diplomat and politician (born 1944)

Ambassador of Turkey to France
- In office 2005–2009

Special Representative of Turkey to Iraq
- In office 2003–2005
- Preceded by: Oğuz Çelikkol

Ambassador of Turkey to Germany
- In office 2000–2003

Ambassador of Turkey to Norway
- In office 1997–2000

Ambassador of Turkey to Iran
- In office 1996–1997

Personal details
- Born: Osman Taney Korutürk; 22 November 1944 (age 81) Istanbul, Turkey
- Spouse: Suzan Korutürk
- Children: 1
- Parent(s): Fahri Korutürk; Emel Korutürk
- Education: Istanbul University

Osman Korutürk (born 22 November 1944) is a Turkish diplomat and politician. Following his retirement from diplomatic post in 2009 he joined the Republican People's Party (CHP) and served as a deputy of Istanbul for one term between 2011 and 2015.

== Early life and education ==
He was born Osman Taney Korutürk in İstanbul on 22 November 1944. His parents are Fahri Korutürk, former President of Turkey, and Emel Korutürk. He has a brother, Salah, and a sister, Ayşe.

Korutürk graduated from Saint Joseph High School in 1965. He received a degree in law from Istanbul University.

== Career and activities ==
Following his graduation Korutürk started his career at the Ministry of Foreign Affairs in 1972. After serving in various diplomatic posts he was named as the ambassador of Turkey to Iran in 1996 and held the post for year. He was the ambassador of Norway between 1997 and 2000. During his tenure he also acted as the ambassador of Turkey to Iceland. Then he was appointed ambassador of Turkey to Germany in 2000 and remained in office until 2003. He was named as the Turkey's special representative to Iraq in 2003, succeeding Oğuz Çelikkol in the post. Korutürk's tenure ended in 2005. His last diplomatic post was the ambassador of Turkey to France and ambassador of Turkey to Monaco which he held between 2005 and 2009.

Korutürk became a member of the CHP and was elected as a member of the CHP party council on 18 December 2010. He was also named as the deputy chairman of the party, but he was removed from the post on 17 August 2011. He was elected as a deputy from CHP representing Istanbul in 2011 and served in the 24th term at the Parliament until 2015.

Korutürk is a member of the CHP's foreign policy advisory council and works as lawyer.

== Personal life ==
Korutürk is married to Suzan Korutürk who is the daughter of academic and writer Münci Kapani. They have a son.
