= Gökçe =

- Pronunciation: [ɟœcˈtʃe]
- Gender: unisex
- Language: Turkish

Origin
- Language: Turkic
- Meaning: "sky blue"

Other names
- Related names: Gökçen

Gökçe is a common unisex Turkish given name. In Turkish, "Gökçe" means sky blue, brave, flamboyant person.

== People ==
=== Given name ===
- Gökçe (singer) (born 1979), full name Gökçe Dinçer, Turkish pop singer
- Gökçe Akyıldız (born 1992), Turkish actress
- Gökçe Bahadır (born 1981), Turkish actress

=== Fictional characters ===
- Gökçe Hatun, character in Diriliş: Ertuğrul

=== Surname ===
- Sariye Gökçe (born 1979), Turkish basketball player
- Nusret Gökçe (born 1983; nicknamed Salt Bae), Turkish butcher, chef, food entertainer and restaurateur

== See also ==
- Gökçe (disambiguation)
