= Gökay =

Gökay (pronounced [ˈɟœkaj]) is a Turkish unisex given name and a surname. Notable people with the name include:

== Given name ==
=== First name ===
- Gökay Akbulut (born 1982), Turkish-German politician and social scientist
- Gökay Güney (born 1999), Turkish football player
- Gökay Iravul (born 1992), Turkish football player

=== Middle name ===
- Ekrem Gökay Yüksel (born 1981), Turkish politician

== Surname ==
- Bahadır Gökay (born 1955), Turkish painter
- Emre Gökay (born 2006), Turkish football player
- Fahrettin Kerim Gökay (1900–1987), Turkish politician and academic
