= Metin Ataç =

Turkish admiral

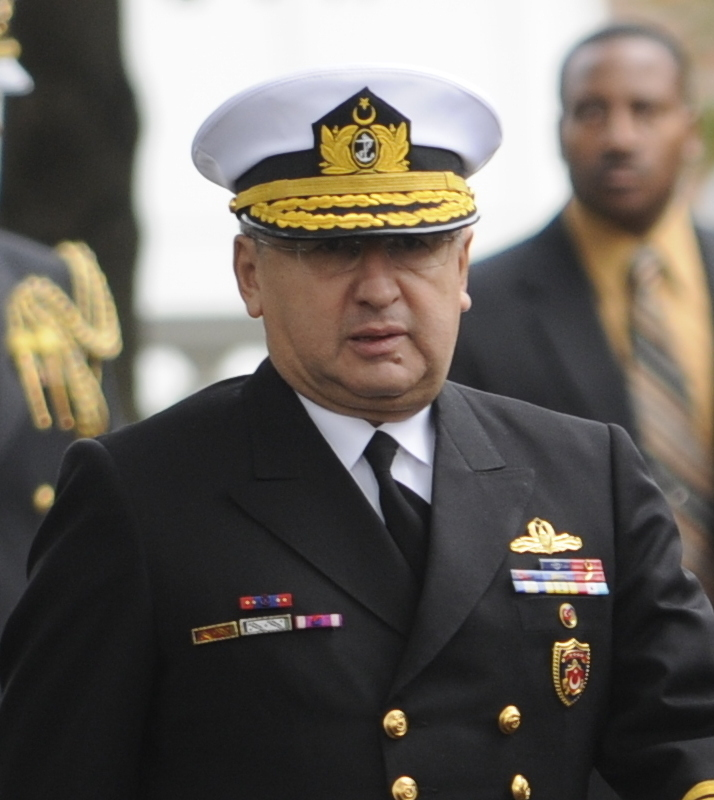
Metin Ataç in Washington, D.C., 2008

Metin Ataç (born 1946, İstanbul) is a Turkish Admiral. He was the 22nd Commander In Chief of the Turkish Navy, serving in that post from 24 August 2007 to 30 August 2009.

Ataç was graduated as a junior ensign from the Naval Academy in 1965, from the Naval War College in İstanbul in 1976, from the NATO Defense College in Rome in 1979, and from the Armed Forces College in İstanbul in 1980.

Ataç first served as a Naval Aviator on board various destroyers, piloting anti-submarine warfare and reconnaissance patrol helicopters. He later served as commodore of Destroyer Division III (1990–1992)) and in various staff positions.

Ataç was promoted Rear Admiral (LH) on 30 August 1992, Rear Admiral (UH) on 30 August 1996, to Vice Admiral on 30 August 2000, and to full Admiral in 2005.

He served as Head of Naval Education and Training (1992–1994), Turkish Navy Chief of Personnel (1992–1994), Commander of the Turkish Mine Warfare Group (1995–1996), Chief of Staff of Turkish Fleet Command (1996–1998), Commander of the Surface Action Group (1998–2000), Inspector General of Turkish Naval Forces Command, Chief of Staff of Turkish Naval Forces Command (2001–2003), and Northern Sea Area Commander (2003–2005), after which he was promoted to Admiral and made Commander In Chief of the Turkish Navy.

After his retirement, Ataç was targeted by an unsuccessful conspiracy by some Turkish naval officers to assassinate him and then-current Turkish Navy head Eşref Uğur Yiğit.

Preceded by Yener Karahanoğlu	Commander-in-Chief of the Turkish Navy; 24 August 2007 – 26 August 2009	Succeeded by Eşref Uğur Yiğit
