= Liberty Party (Turkey) =

Defunct political party in Turkey

Liberty Party (Turkish: Hürriyet Partisi) was a former political party in Turkey founded in 1955.

== Background ==
Democrat Party (DP) won the 1950 elections and ended the one party era of Turkey. DP, being a moderately right wing party had promised a freer press and wider scope of basic liberties during the election campaign. But following the 1950 and 1954 victories, the press was disappointed. Because DP government refused to expand press freedom and the press faced the threat of censorship. However the decision of the government was not shared by all parliament members of DP and 11 MPs proposed a law to expand the press freedom in 1955. But the reaction of the party leaders was harsh and the 9 MPs were expelled from the party.

== The history of Liberty Party ==
The expelled MPs together with 19 MP supporters founded the Liberty Party on 20 December 1955. The leaders of the Party were Ekrem Hayri Üstündağ and Fevzi Lütfi Karaosmanoğlu. (Ekrem Alican who would be the leader of New Turkey Parti in 1961 was also a charter member) In the period 1956–1957 the general secretary of the party was Şerif Mardin. The party managed to send only four MPs to parliament in the 1957 general elections (all from Burdur Province). One of these was Fethi Çelikbaş an ex-state minister. During the congress held on 24 November 1958 the party dissolved itself. Most of the sympathizers as well as Fethi Çelikbaş joined Republican People's Party, the main opposition party of the period.

One of the supporters of the Liberty Party was the Forum magazine which was started by Aydın and Nilüfer Yalçın in 1954.
