= Fahri Korutürk =

President of Turkey from 1973 to 1980

6th President of Turkey
- In office 6 April 1973 – 6 April 1980
- Prime Minister: Ferit Melen; Naim Talu; Bülent Ecevit; Sadi Irmak; Süleyman Demirel
- Preceded by: Cevdet Sunay; Tekin Arıburun (acting)
- Succeeded by: İhsan Sabri Çağlayangil (acting)

Commander of the Turkish Navy
- In office 12 September 1957 – 2 July 1960
- Preceded by: Sadık Altıncan
- Succeeded by: Zeki Özak

Personal details
- Born: 15 August 1903 Constantinople, Ottoman Empire
- Died: 12 October 1987 (aged 84) Istanbul, Turkey
- Resting place: Turkish State Cemetery
- Party: Independent
- Spouse: Emel Korutürk (m. 1944)
- Children: 3, including Osman Korutürk
- Education: Turkish Naval High School
- Alma mater: Turkish Naval Academy; Turkish Naval War Institute
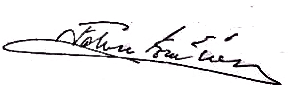
- Signature

Fahri Sabit Korutürk (15 August 1903 – 12 October 1987) was a Turkish admiral, diplomat and politician who was the president of Turkey from 1973 to 1980. Before his presidency, he served as the commander of the Turkish Naval Forces from 1957 to 1960.

He was also a member of the Senate of the Republic from 1968 to 1973 and again in 1980. Prior to his senatorship, he served as Turkey's ambassador to the Soviet Union from 1960 to 1964.

== Biography ==
He was born in Istanbul, at Soğukçeşme Sokağı, a small street between Topkapı Palace and Hagia Sophia. He attended the Ottoman Navy cadet school in 1916, was graduated in 1923 and from the Naval Academy in 1933. On 18 March 1934 after an encounter with President Atatürk he was given Korutürk as his Surname. Korutürk saw active service on cruisers and submarines and later traveled abroad as naval attaché in Rome, Berlin and Stockholm. In 1936, he participated in Montreux Convention Regarding the Regime of the Turkish Straits as military advisor. He was made rear admiral in 1950 and commanded various units until he became admiral.

After his retirement in 1960 from the post of Commander of the Turkish Navy, Korutürk was appointed by the Head of State Cemal Gürsel as Turkish ambassador to the Soviet Union (1960-1964) and later to Spain (1964-1965). In 1968, President Cevdet Sunay appointed him member of the Senate. On 6 April 1973, the Grand National Assembly of Turkey elected him the 6th President of the Republic of Turkey. During his term he presided over the Turkish Invasion of Cyprus after Archbishop Makarios III was ousted by the Greek officer-led Cypriot National Guard.

Korutürk served the constitutional term of seven years until 6 April 1980. Kenan Evren said that he suggested President Korutürk to occupy the office of presidency one more term through military's intervention as he was a respected figure by both military officers and parliamentarians, but he refused this offer and stated it would be unconstitutional. Afterwards he became a senator until the coup d`etat in 1980.

He married Emel Korutürk in 1944 and they had two sons, Osman and Selah, and a daughter, Ayşe. Fahri Korutürk died in Moda, Istanbul. He was laid to rest in the Turkish State Cemetery in Ankara.

His son Osman Korutürk was appointed Turkey's ambassador in Tehran in October 1996. The Iranian government presented him with documents about his father that had been acquired during 1979 seizure of American embassy. In the documents it's said that most ambassadors serving in Soviet Union used the black market to exchange their paychecks with American dollars (which had more value among the population) while Fahri Korutürk is the only one who used Gosbank to exchange his paycheck.

== Works ==
- İskajerak Deniz Muharebesi Hakkında Bir Konferans (A Conference on the Battle of Skagerrak)

== See also ==
- List of Turkish diplomats
- 1973 Turkish presidential election

Military offices
Preceded by Sadık Altıncan	Commander of the Turkish Navy; 12 September 1957 – 2 July 1960	Succeeded by Zeki Özak
Political offices
Preceded by Cevdet Sunay	President of Turkey; 6 April 1973 – 6 April 1980	Succeeded by Kenan Evren
