= Emel Korutürk =

Turkish painter and first lady from 1973 to 1980

First Lady of Turkey
- In role 6 April 1973 – 6 April 1980
- President: Fahri Korutürk
- Preceded by: Atıfet Sunay
- Succeeded by: Sekine Evren

Personal details
- Born: Emel Cimcoz; 1915 Constantinople, Ottoman Empire
- Died: 12 March 2013 (aged 97–98) Istanbul, Turkey
- Resting place: Zincirlikuyu Cemetery, Istanbul
- Spouse: Fahri Korutürk (m. 1944; died 1987)
- Children: 3, including Osman Korutürk
- Education: Mimar Sinan Fine Arts University
- Profession: Painter

Emel Korutürk (née Cimcoz; 1915 – 12 March 2013) was a Turkish painter and a former First Lady of Turkey.

== Early years ==
She was born in 1915 as Emel Cimcoz, the fourth child of Salah Cimcöz and his wife Hasene Hanim. During her early childhood her father was exiled by the Allies of World War I to Malta.

After her primary education, she studied at Lycée Notre Dame de Sion Istanbul, a prestigious school for girls. She took private art lessons from Fikret Mualla, but he was fired in 1936 after a violent argument with her father. Following her high school years in Lausanne, Switzerland, she graduated from Güzel Sanatlar Akademisi, which is now Mimar Sinan Fine Arts University, in 1936. During her academy years, she was congratulated by Mustafa Kemal Atatürk, the first president of Turkey, for her talent in art in 1933. After academy, she worked together with Turkish painter İbrahim Çallı.

== Family life ==
In 1944 she married Fahri Korutürk, a naval officer. The couple had two sons and a daughter, Osman, Selah and Ayşe.

Between 1960 and 1977 Fahri Korutürk was the commander of the Turkish Naval Forces. After his retirement from the navy in 1960, he was appointed as Turkish ambassador to the Soviet Union (1960–1964) and later to Spain (1964–1965). In 1968 Fahri Korutürk was elected as the senate member by the president who had the right to name 15 members of the Turkish senate. In 1973, he was elected as the 6th president of Turkey. Thus Emel Korutürk became the first lady of the country. In 1980 Fahri Korutürk's term as the president ended and in 1987 he died. Emel Korutürk lived another 26 years and died on 13 March 2013 in Istanbul.

== Her contributions to art ==
During her term as the first lady, she concentrated on promoting Turkish painting. She was instrumental in presidential receptions to Turkish artists. She also supported the foundation of the Ankara State Art and Sculpture Museum which would be a model for other such museums. In this museum, she began collecting 34 paintings of Turkish artist Fikret Mualla. Her painting "Gratitude to Gazi" (referring to "Atatürk") is also exhibited in the museum.
