= TCG Yavuz (F 240) =

1985 Barbaros-class frigate

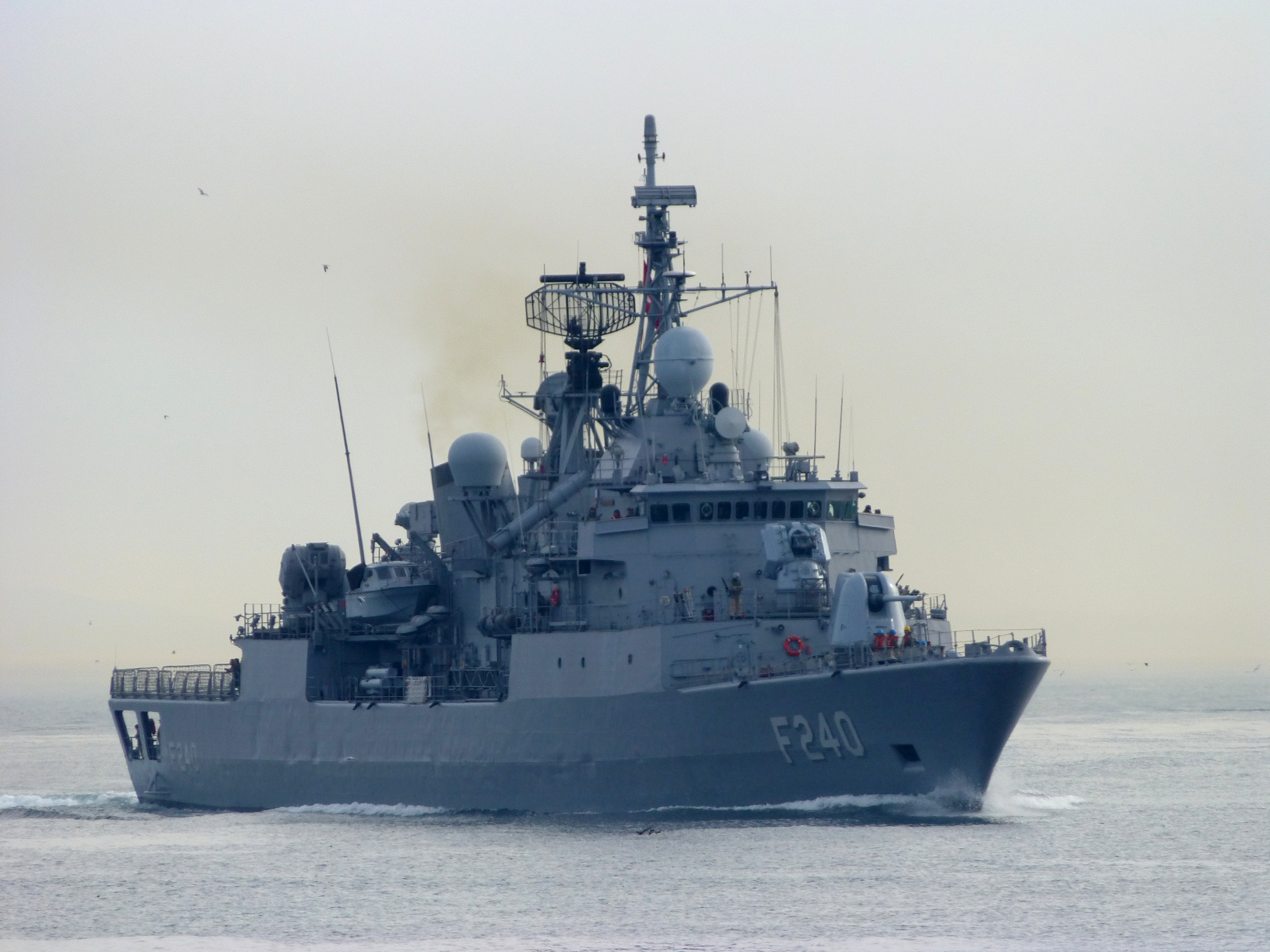
- TCG Yavuz on 4 April 2012

History

Turkey
- Name: Yavuz
- Namesake: Selim I
- Builder: Blohm+Voss, Hamburg, Germany
- Launched: 30 May 1985
- Commissioned: 11 October 1987
- Reclassified: March 2024
- Home port: Gölcük, Kocaeli, Türkiye
- Identification: Pennant number: F 240
- Motto: Gururlu, Güçlü, Öncü (Proud, Strong, Pioneering)
- Fate: Museum ship

General characteristics
- Class & type: Yavuz-class frigate
- Displacement: 3,030 tons full load
- Length: 110.50 m (362.53 ft)
- Beam: 13.25 m (43.47 ft)
- Draught: 3.94 m (12.93 ft)
- Installed power: 4 MTU 20V 1163 diesel-engines, 30,000 hp (22,000 kW) CODAD
- Propulsion: 2 shaft, controllable pitch propellers
- Speed: 27 knots (50 km/h; 31 mph)
- Range: 4,000 nautical miles (7,000 km) at 20 knots (37 km/h)
- Complement: 180 (29 officers, 151 enlisted)
- Sensors & processing systems: Radar; TM 1126; AWS-6; HSA D08; HSA STIR 124; Sonar; SQS-56,
- Electronic warfare & decoys: ARES-2NC ESM, Mk 36 decoy
- Armament: 2 Mk 141 quad-pack Launcher for 8 × RGM-84 Harpoon; 1 MK 29 Guided Missile Launching System for 8 × RIM-7 Sea Sparrow; 1 × 5 inch /54 gun; 3 × Oerlikon Contraves Sea Zenith 25 mm CIWS gun systems; 2 × 3 12.75 in Mk.32 torpedo tubes in triple mountings
- Aircraft carried: AB-212 Helicopter
- Aviation facilities: Hangar and platform for; 1 × AB 212 ASW helicopter

TCG Yavuz (F 240) is the lead ship of Yavuz-class frigate of the Turkish Navy.

== Development and design ==
Yavuz-class frigates were designed in Germany and are part of the MEKO family of modular warships; in this case the MEKO 200 design. An order for ships was signed by the Turkish government in April 1983 for four MEKO frigates. Two ships were built in Germany and two in Turkey with German assistance. They are similar in design to the larger Barbaros-class frigates of the Turkish Navy, which are improved versions of the Yavuz-class frigate.

The Turkish Navy has an ongoing limited modernization project for an electronic warfare suite. The intent is to upgrade the ships with locally produced ECM, ECCM systems, active decoys, LWRs, IRST, and the necessary user interface systems.

== Construction and career ==
Yavuz was launched on 30 May 1985 by Blohm+Voss in Hamburg and commissioned on 11 October 1987.

On 11 September 2020, she escorted TCG İskenderun in the Mediterranean while on her way to the Port of Marmaris.

She was withdrawn from frontline service in 2024 and converted into a museum ship. She opened to the public in Istanbul in August 2026.
