= Sadık Altıncan =

Turkish politician

Member of the Grand National Assembly

Personal details
- Born: 1898 Constantinople, Ottoman Empire
- Died: 1963 (aged 64–65)

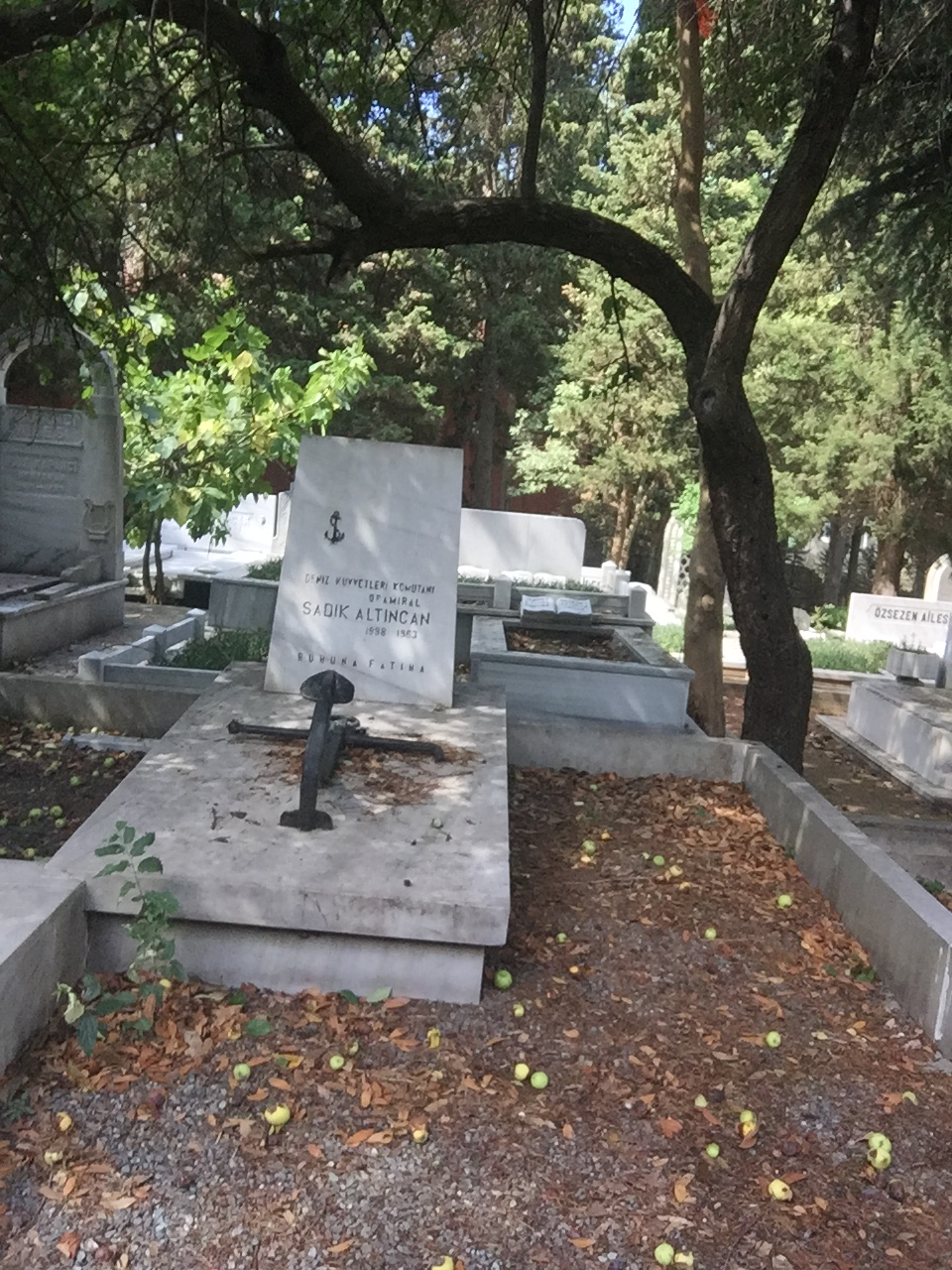
Grave of Sadık Altıncan, Zincirlikuyu Cemetery

Sadık Altıncan (1898–1963) was a Turkish navy officer and statesman, who was a prominent figure in the transition to a multiparty system.
