= Naval High School (Turkey) =

- Deniz Lisesi
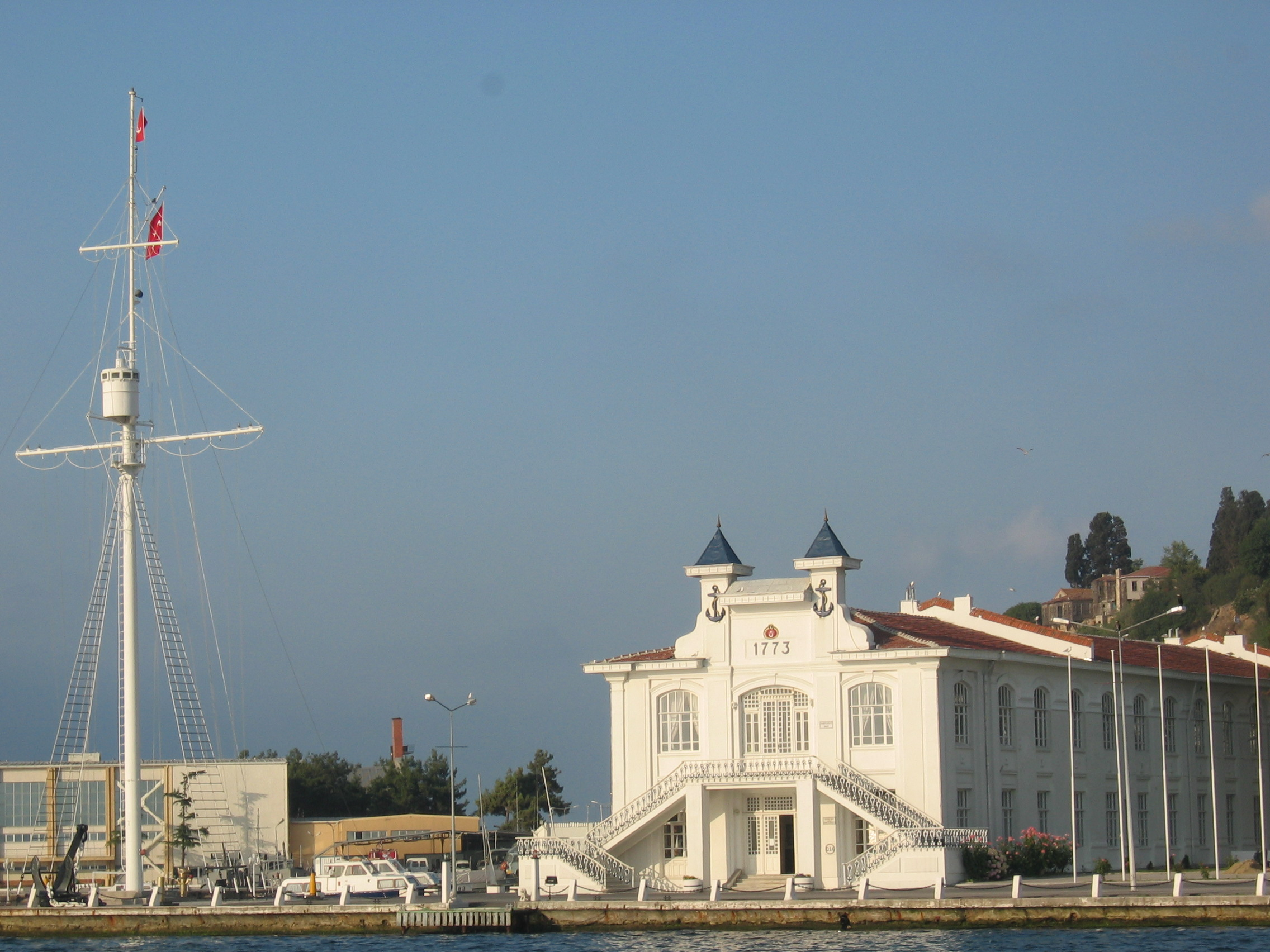
- Naval High School in Heybeliada Island
- Istanbul, Heybeliada; Turkey

Information
- School type: Public, military, boarding
- Founded: 1773; 253 years ago
- Closed: 31 July 2016
- Colors: Navy blue and white

The Naval High School (Turkish: Deniz Lisesi) was a Turkish naval high school located on Heybeliada Island (the second largest of the Princes' Islands) in the Sea of Marmara, to the southeast of Istanbul, Turkey.

The school trained naval cadets for the Turkish Naval Academy. Established in 1773, it is one of the oldest Turkish high schools. Being a military school in nature, access was open only to students who were Turkish citizens with a special admission exam and physical test.

After the 2016 Turkish coup d'état attempt, the Naval High School, along with the other military high schools in Turkey, was closed. Subsequently, the National Defense University was established in 2016.

== History ==
The history of Deniz Lisesi dates back to 1773. The high school was established as the Imperial School of Naval Engineering (Mühendishane-i Bahr-i Hümâyûn) in the Kasımpaşa district of Istanbul, on the northern shoreline of the Golden Horn, where the shipyards and arsenal of the Ottoman Navy, and the headquarters of the Ottoman Ministry of the Navy (Bahriye Nezareti) were located. It was later known as the Imperial Naval School (Mekteb-i Bahriye-i Şahane).

=== Origins (1773–1834) ===
First school which forms the Naval Academy's basis was founded by Cezayirli Gazi Hasan Pasha under the name of Naval Engineering Golden Horn Naval Shipyard during the reign of Mustafa III in 1773. It was rather a course providing education to civilian captains of merchant marine as well. In this course, given onboard of a galleon anchored at Kasımpaşa, Plane Geometry and Navigation were taught.

According to Memories of Baron de Tott, which were published after his returning to his country, in 1773 he was appointed for establishment of a Naval Shipyard Mathematical College on the command of Hasan Pasha during the reign of Sultan Mustafa III, who was a believer of the fact that science and education must have become widespread. The trainees who were advanced in age, even the captains with white beard had reached to a capacity within three months that they were able to measure altitude, practice the four rules of the plane geometry over the land, and plot a route. This training ended as it was sufficient for the trainees in their sixties and Sultan Mustafa III and Baron de Tott decided that this education would be consummated by practices in course of time.

The Mathematical College in the shipyard was so small and didn't meet the requirement. Thus a new mathematical college with several rooms started to be constructed on about the same place where the galleons with three holds were constructed. The school that would give three- year education, started training in its new building under the name of "The Imperial Naval Engineering School" on October 22, 1784. Naval Engineering School was divided into two divisions. In the first division, Navigation and Plotting oriented education was given, and in the second division cadets were educated for being Naval architecture officers.

Naval Engineering School was burnt in a conflagration setting some parts of Kasimpasa on fire in 1821, and it was transferred to reconstructed Errehane (sawmill) building around Parmakkapi in the shipyard in 1822.

When Sultan Mahmud II came to Divanhane (imperial hall of audience) for a stone pool construction at the place which is known today as Tas Havuzlar (Stone Pools), He was said that the building in Parmakkapi was unsuitable for education, and according to his imperial order the construction of a separate school was conformed. Until the construction completed, transfer of Science of Navigation division to Heybeliada, as a temporary solution, was decided.

=== Interim period (1834–1909) ===
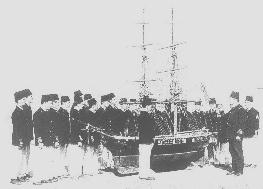
A group of young Bahriyeli (literally meaning "naval crewman" or "naval officer") of the Ottoman Navy

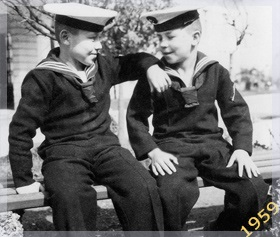
Children wearing the Bahriyeli uniforms of the Turkish Navy

During the days that the school was moved from Heybeliada to the new construction at Kasimpasa in 1838, it is understood from the code of laws promulgated over the school that the education and training activities were commenced with an effective program.

The school, called "Naval School" after the Reformation, functioned in Kasimpasa for 12 years then was moved again to Heybeliada for the last time. The school had 34 rooms and 150 trainees. Furthermore, a 30-bed hospital, a pharmacy, a printing house, a book binder's shop, and a very big library were available. English training system was followed and some lessons were even taught by English instructors.

In that period, in addition to the name "Naval School", the school was also called "Naval School The Great", "Naval Technical School" and "Naval Technical School The Great".

Sultan Abdülaziz (1861-1876) was the first Ottoman sultan to travel to Europe. Invited by Napoleon III, in June–July 1867 he attended the World Exhibition in Paris. He then visited Queen Victoria in London, Wilhelm I in Prussia and Franz Joseph I in Vienna. Sultan Abdülaziz was impressed by the French educational system during his visit, and on his return to Istanbul he announced the Edict of Public Education, which established a free compulsory education system for all children until they became twelve.

In the reign of the Sultan Abdülaziz the number of the trainees registered was increased and the education was improved. The training programs were handled again parallel to technological development of the century, and a steam division- to operate the steam engines, was added, in addition to the Deck and Naval Architecture divisions. Thus, the Naval School had an aspect of a school giving 8-year education, 4 years of which in Naval High School and 4 years at the Academy.

=== Modern period (1909–1923) ===
After the Second Constitution Period, an upgraded education system, adapted from British Naval Academy, was applied in 1909.

During the years of the Balkan War, the educational system was modified. Hence, four-year Naval School graduates were educated for three years on board the school ship as engineers. After that, they would assumed their duties by being promoted to Lieutenant Junior Grade. Thus the school, called "Island School", had the property of being most significant school of Turkey with respect to both educational system and social life.

Starting August 1917, the school had a German commander, Kapitänleutnant Kurt Böcking, who was serving at the school until the German capitulation in November 1918. Böcking's personal staff translator was the Istanbul-born Wolfgang Schrader (1894-1984), the oldest son of Friedrich Schrader, and a German veteran of the Battle of Gallipoli, where he had been responsible for construction of "Hersingstand", the land base of U21 facing the Gulf of Saros.

=== Republic period (1923–present) ===
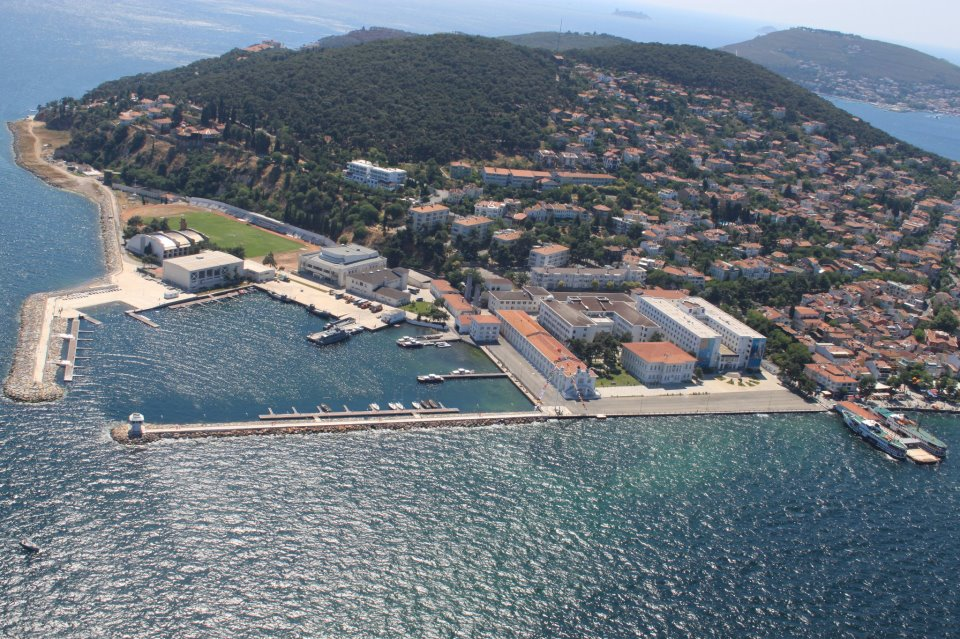
Aerial view of the school from above the Sea of Marmara

With the abolition of the Ottoman Empire and the proclamation of the Republic of Turkey in 1923, the name of the school was changed to "Deniz Lisesi".

It is seen that in Republic Period the cadets admitted to Naval School were to be educated over deck, engine, and secretary divisions. The training term for deck and engine divisions was four years, the first year of which was the preparation period. Cadets that could graduate at the end of this period, underwent a course for another year, after then, they commenced their duties in the Navy by being promoted to engineer (ensign).

Heybeliada Naval School was given the name of "Naval High School" by the command of General Chief of Staff on 27 May 1928, and the curriculum of military schools was applied in the new education term beginning on the first of August. This new education and training system, began in 1928, was applied for two academic years. Naval High School and Naval Basic School were re-united at the facilities of Heybeliada under the name of "Naval Academy and High School".

When the Second World War started in 1941 and Germans began to occupy Balkans, the transportation of the Naval Schools to Anatolia was necessary. And on 23 May the Naval Academy and High School were transported to Infantry Barracks in Mersin. Naval Academy and High School located in this place unsuitable for education until 9 September 1946, when it was transferred back to Heybeliada.

After 2016 Turkish coup d'état attempt Naval High School along with other Military High Schools is closed. Currently Turkish citizens who finished a civilian high school can apply directly to Turkish Naval Academy by passing necessary exams and various tests.

== Education ==
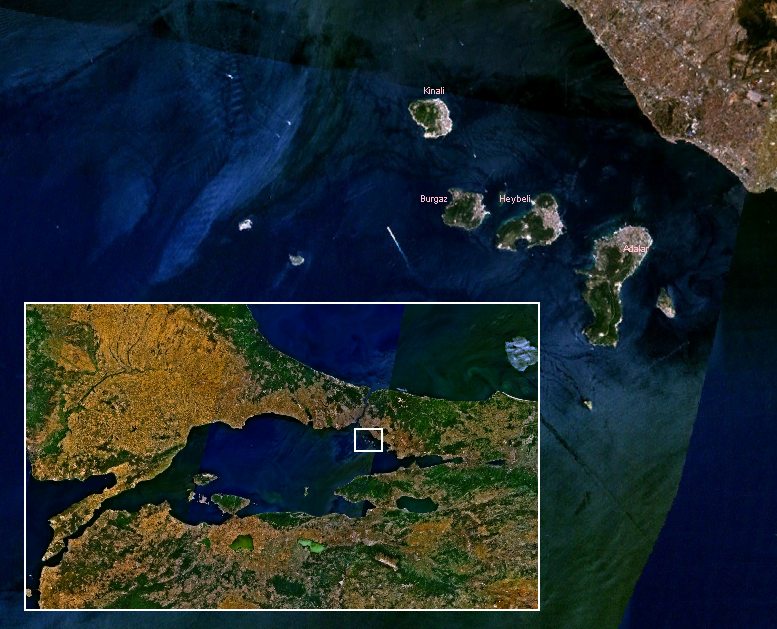
Satellite photo of the Prince Islands (Heybeliada is third from left)

Education was primarily in Turkish and English.

The school years break down as follows:

English Prep (1 year) High School (4 years)

All graduates of the Naval High School were directly admitted to the Turkish Naval Academy with no further examination following the oath taking ceremony.

== Motto ==
"Denizlere Hakim Olan Cihana Hakim Olur", meaning "Who controls the seas, controls the world".

== Deniz Lisesi sports ==
The sports team of the high school was named Deniz Gücü (Sea Power).

== Deniz Lisesi extracurricular activities ==
- Culture and Literature Club
- Theatre Club
- Naval History Club
- Model Ships Club
- Music Club
- Press Club
- Arts Club
- Science & Technology Club
- Photography Club
- Cinema Club
- Natural Sports Club
- Computer Club
- Chess Club
- Dance Club
- Foreign Languages Club
- Drum and Bugle Corps

== Deniz Lisesi traditions ==
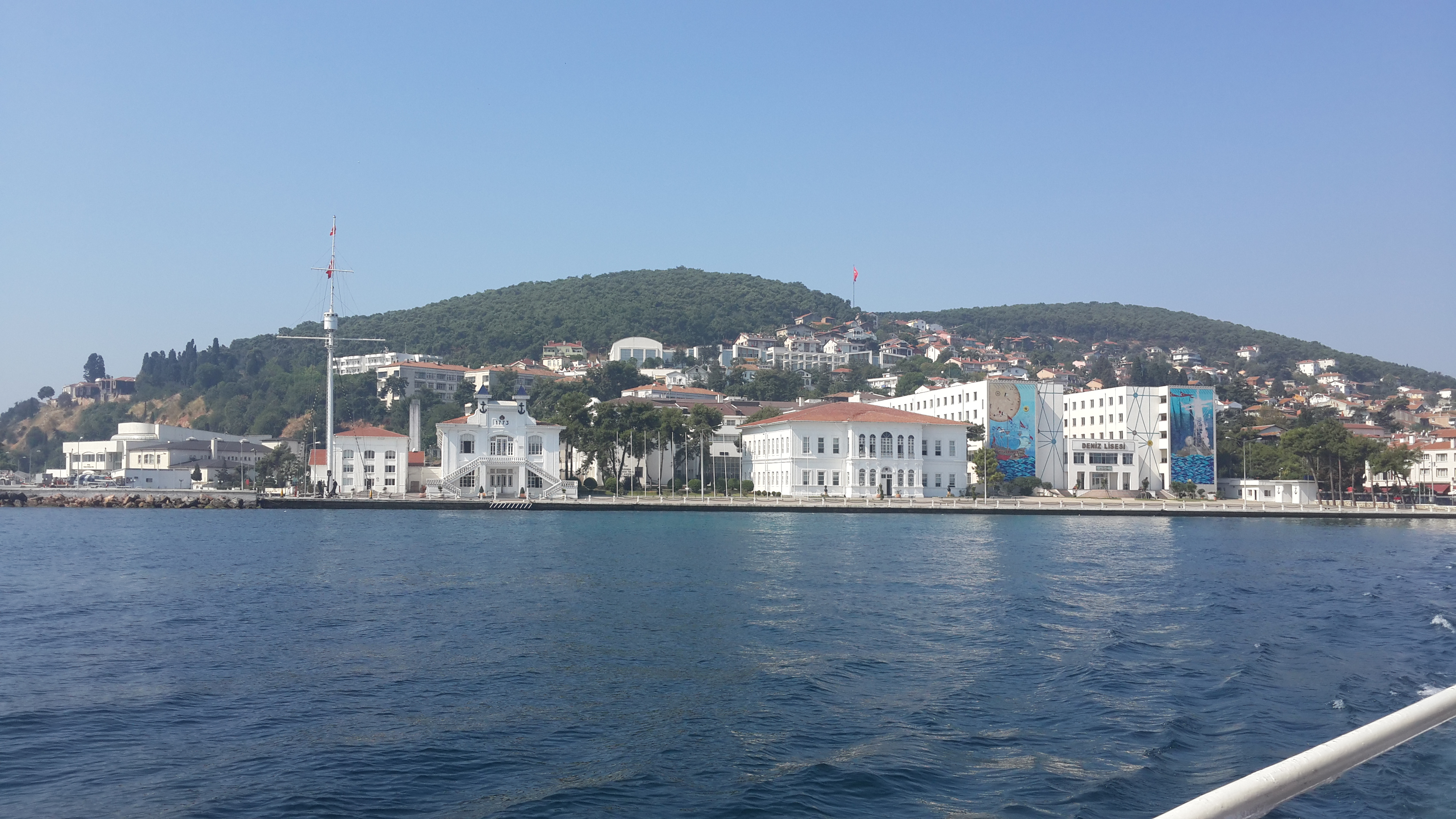
Naval High School (1773) in Heybeliada Island near Istanbul

=== Fraternity: "Efe'm" tradition ===
At Deniz Lisesi there was a tradition of respecting the senior class students. The seniors protect the junior class students while the junior ones respect the senior, creating a relationship of fraternal hierarchy and ranks among the student body. After graduation, this fraternity transformed into a natural military hierarchic order.

=== Deniz Lisesi Alumni Day ===
Deniz Lisesi alumni gathered on the grounds of the school in Heybeliada every year, on November 18, to enjoy a day of reunion and reenact their daily routines as in the old school days.

=== Deniz Lisesi Lamb Day ===
Lamb Day (Kuzu Gunu), a day of reunion and feast for all Gemiciler, where a special Pilav (rice pilaf) and lamb meat was served in the school's cafeterias at the end of the academic year. Hierarchic order among classes are suspended for the duration of the day and students relax through competing with each other in many sportive events, with a special highlight on the rowing competition and the famous tug of war. Many schools have copied this tradition and now hold their reunions and call them "Lamb Days".

== Deniz Lisesi alumni ==
During 80 years of the Republican Period, there was one President, two Prime Ministers and many other high level officials in the state administration. Apart from these, many academicians, judges, educators, writers, doctors, architects, engineers, journalists, artists, stage artists, poets, painters etc. constitute the illustrious alumni of this institution.

=== President ===
- Fahri Korutürk, President of the Republic

=== Prime Ministers ===
- Rauf Orbay, Prime Minister of Turkey
- Bülend Ulusu, Prime Minister of Turkey

=== Notable diplomats ===
- Fahri Korutürk, Turkish Ambassador to USSR

=== Famous writers and poets ===
- Nâzım Hikmet
- Necip Fazıl Kısakürek

=== Notable graduates ===
- Kemal Kayacan, Senator
- Ali Kirca, TV Anchorman
- Sarp Kuray, Left wing revolutionary
- Seyfi Dursunoğlu, TV Showman better known as Huysuz Virjin

== Deniz Lisesi notable faculty ==
- Yahya Kemal Beyatlı
- Hamdullah Suphi Tanrıöver
- Hüseyin Cahit Yalçın
- Ahmet Hamdi

== See also ==
- Turkish Naval Academy
- Turkish Navy
- Heybeliada
