= Turkish Naval Academy =

Military academy in Istanbul, Turkey

Coordinates: 40°48′37″N 29°15′48″E

- Deniz Harp Okulu
- Type: Naval Academy
- Established: November 18, 1773; 252 years ago as Naval Engineering Golden Horn Naval Shipyard
- Founder: Mustafa III
- Parent institution: National Defense University
- Rector: Erhan Afyoncu
- Dean: Cemalettin Şahin
- Location: Tuzla, Istanbul, Turkey
- Website: dho.msu.edu.tr

The Turkish Naval Academy (Turkish: Deniz Harp Okulu) or as it is known historically and popularly Bahriye is a four-year co-educational military academy and part of the National Defense University in Turkey. It is located in the district of Tuzla in Istanbul. Its mission is to develop cadets mentally and physically for service as commissioned officers in the Turkish Navy. It is distinct from the Turkish Naval War College, which functions as a postgraduate staff college.

== History ==
=== Foundation ===
The roots of the Naval Academy go back to 1773, when a naval school under the name of "Naval Engineering at Golden Horn Naval Shipyard" was founded during the reign of Sultan Mustafa III on the command of Grand Vizier and Admiral Cezayirli Gazi Hasan Pasha. François Baron de Tott, a French officer and advisor to the Ottoman military, was appointed for the establishment of a course to provide education on plane geometry and navigation. The course, attended also by civilian captains of the merchant marine, was given on board a galleon anchored at Kasımpaşa in Istanbul and lasted three months.

The temporary course turned into a continuous education on land with the establishment of the Naval Mathematical College in February 1776. With growing number of cadets, the college building at the naval shipyard was extended. On October 22, 1784, the college, renamed the Imperial Naval Engineering School (Ottoman Turkish: Mühendishâne-i Bahrî-i Hümâyûn), started its education for three years in the new building. From 1795 on, the training was divided into navigation and cartography for officers of the deck, and naval architecture and shipbuilding for naval engineers.

=== Ottoman period ===
The school was moved 1822 into a reconstructed sawmill building in Parmakkapı after a fire in Kasımpaşa neighborhood in 1821 destroyed also the naval school. Since this building was insufficient for the matters of education, Sultan Mahmud II ordered the construction of a new school building. It was decided that until the completion of the new facility, the navigation division of the school be transferred temporarily to Heybeliada, an island in the Sea of Marmara. In 1838, the naval school moved into its new building in Kasımpaşa. With the beginning of the reformation efforts, the school was renamed to the Naval School (Ottoman Turkish: Mekteb-i Bahriye) and continued to serve in Kasımpaşa for 12 years. Then, it was relocated 1850 to Heybeliada for the last time.

The facilities of the naval school on Heybeliada consisted of 34 rooms for 150 cadets, a 30-bed hospital with a pharmacy, a printing house with a bookbinder's shop, and a rich library. The training followed English education system, and some lessons were taught by English instructors. In that period, in addition to the name "Naval School", it was also called "Imperial Naval School" (Ottoman Turkish: Mekteb-i Bahriye-i Şahane), "School of Naval Sciences" (Ottoman Turkish: Mekteb-i Fünun-i Bahriye) or "Imperial School of Naval Sciences" (Ottoman Turkish: Mekteb-i Fünun-i Bahriye-i Şahane).

During the reign of Sultan Abdulaziz, the number of the cadets increased, and the education program was improved. The training program was extended parallel to technological development of the century, and a division for marine engineering was added to operate and maintain steam engines. Cadets were educated four years in the Naval High School, and they were trained four more years in the Naval Academy, whereas the last two years were spent on board the school ship.

During the Second Constitutional Era, an upgraded education system was adapted in 1909 from the Royal Naval Academy. In the years of the Balkan Wars, the educational system was modified. Hence, the graduates of the four-year Naval High School received sea training for one year on board the school ship as a midshipman followed by three years training in the navy in the rank of ensign. Upon graduation, they assumed their duties by being promoted to Lieutenant-Commander grade. The school, nicknamed the "Island School", had the property of being most significant school of Turkey with respect to both educational system and social life.

=== Republican era ===
The admission to the Naval School resumed in 1924 after the proclamation of the Republic, and the cadets could study in one of the three fields such as navigation, engineering and secretary work. The training period for deck officers and engineers lasted four years, with the first year devoted to preparatory education. After graduation, cadets completed an additional year of training and entered the Navy with the rank of ensign as engineers.

Heybeliada Naval School (Turkish: Heybeliada Bahriye Mektebi) was given the name of "Naval High School" (Turkish: Deniz Lisesi) by the command of General Chief of Staff on May 27, 1928, and the curriculum of military schools was adopted in the following education term. This new education and training system was applied for two academic years. Naval High School and Naval Core School were re-united at the facilities of Heybeliada under the name of "Naval Academy and High School" (Turkish: Deniz Harp Okulu ve Lisesi).

When Germans began to occupy the Balkans in 1941 during World War II, the Naval School was relocated to Anatolia. On May 23, 1941, the Naval Academy and High School were transferred to the Infantry Barracks in Mersin. The institution remained there until September 9, 1946, when it returned to Heybeliada.

The transfer of the academy to a more convenient location arose as a necessity, due to increasing demands of the Turkish Navy over personnel and place as well as transportation problems of the island of Heybeliada. A new campus was projected over 3,000-acre (12 km^{2}) land at Tuzburnu peninsula on the northern shore of Marmara Sea in Tuzla district of Istanbul. On July 28, 1977, Fahri Korutürk, President of Turkey and an alumnus of the Naval School, laid the foundation.

The Naval Academy facilities in Tuzla were opened by the Turkish President Kenan Evren on July 31, 1985. The academy left Heybeliada to the Naval High School.

First officers from the new campus graduated in 1989. At the beginning of 1990, the status of military academies in regard of the Bachelor of Science concept at universities was discussed. With the beginning of the academic term 1991-1992, the education programs at military academies were upgraded in a manner equivalent to the engineering programs at Boğaziçi University, Istanbul Technical University and Middle East Technical University. The graduates receive a BSc degree upon graduation from the Naval Academy without requiring further studies in post-graduate programs of the technical universities in Turkey. The first officers with a BSc degree in addition to a Naval Academy diploma left the institution in 1997.

Control and electronic engineering branch, a sub-division of electric & electronics division, was separated as control systems and computer engineering in 1993, starting from the second class. To become harmonized with STCW-95 agreements (International Convention on Standards of Training, Certification and Watchkeeping for Seafarers), a new educational program starting from the first class was applied in 1995. Moreover, the number of vocational and foreign language courses was increased, graduation project was extended from one-semester to four-semester course, meteorology and intelligence courses were added.

For the training of officers for the marines and engineering corps branches, graduates of civilian high schools were admitted in 1995 to the first class. However, this type of sourcing process was abandoned the next year. The first officers of marines and engineering corps were commissioned in 1998.

In 2000, the academy's organization was restructured by reconstructing the branches granting engineering degrees and increasing the number of major science branches from four to nine. The same year, the "Naval Sciences and Engineering Institute" was founded for postgraduate studies in order to meet the needs of the Turkish Armed Forces, starting from 2001–2002 academic term.

After 2016 Turkish coup d'état attempt Naval Academy (along with Military Academy, Air Force Academy and the all other military educational institutions) became part of the new National Defense University which is formed under Ministry of National Defence.

== Education ==
Until 1953, education term at the Naval Academy was two years, the first year theoretical at the school and the last year practice in the Navy. In 1953, four-year line system education was adopted. In the first two years, the students were cadets and in the following two years officers. With the academic term 1969–1970, the education structure was reorganized such as the cadets studied three years and the officers one year. One year later, the organization was modified so that the officers were educated in the "Officer Basic Expert School".

In 1974, the education term was increased to four years and the curriculum was extended with electrical, electronic and mechanical engineering, operations research, management science, systems engineering, communications, computer science, shipbuilding, oceanography and international relations. First officers having studied in this program graduated in 1978. With the beginning of the academic term 1986-1987, these modern fields of study are fully implemented in the curriculum as majors.

The Academy facilitates cadet participation in international competitions with other naval academies during the academic year. Cadets who successfully complete specialized training programs conducted by personnel of the Turkish Naval Forces may be awarded internationally recognized qualifications, including the One Star Diver Badge, the Frogman Certificate, and the High Level Sailing Certificate.

As part of annual open-sea training programs, cadets undertake port visits to foreign harbors, including those in France, Italy, Spain, and Portugal, providing opportunities for international exposure. During their careers, naval officers may also gain experience in different countries through port visits, short-term assignments or courses ranging from several weeks to one year, as well as longer-term overseas postings lasting two to three years.

== Women and foreign cadets ==
Admission of female cadets, graduated from civilian high schools, were granted in the academic term 1992–1993.

According to military training cooperation agreements signed with friendly and allied countries, guest students, especially from Turkic Republics as well as from Albania and Pakistan were admitted in the 1993–1994 academic year.

== Academics ==
=== Academic departments ===
- Department of Military Sciences
  - Military sciences
  - Naval machinery operation
  - Navigation-ship handling
  - Weapons-tactics
- Department of Basic Sciences
  - Physics
  - Chemistry
  - Mathematics
- Department of Social Sciences
  - Economics and management
  - Political sciences
  - History
- Department of Foreign Languages
  - English
  - German

=== Engineering programs ===
- Department of Industrial Engineering
  - Industrial engineering
  - Operations research
- Department of Mechanical Engineering
  - Thermodynamics and energy
  - Solid mechanics
- Department of Naval Architecture Engineering
  - Naval architecture
  - Hydromechanics
- Department of Computer Engineering
  - Hardware
  - Software
- Department of Electric/Electronics Engineering
  - Electronics
  - Communication
  - Control systems

== Postgraduate studies ==
In the first semester at the Naval Sciences and Engineering Institute, following courses are provided for postgraduate students, who graduate with a master's degree in two semesters.

=== Computer engineering ===
- Analysis of algorithms
- Sensor networks
- Data and network security
- New trends in operating systems
- Wireless network protocols

=== Industrial engineering ===
- Master of Business Administration (MBA)
- Financial accounting
- Management and organization
- Strategic marketing management
- Research and decision techniques
- Human resources management
- Economics

=== Mechanical engineering ===
- Mechanical Engineering Master Program
- Modeling and control of Mechatronics systems
- Advanced fluid mechanics
- Heat transformation with convection
- Thermodynamics simulation of Diesel engines

== Notable alumni ==
- Ahmet Fetgeri Aşeni (1886–1966), founding member of Beşiktaş JK
- Gökçen Fırat (born 1977), first female admiral and ship commander in the history of the Republic of Turkey
- Fahri Korutürk (1903–1987), 6th President of Turkey
- Abdul Aziz Mirza (born 1943), 15th Chief of Pakistan Naval Staff
- Rauf Orbay (1881–1964), 3rd Prime Minister of Turkey
- Nazım Hikmet Ran (1901–1963), poet
- Bülend Ulusu (1922–2015), 18th Prime Minister of Turkey
- Mahmut Yavuz (born 1982), Turkish navy officer, SAT SOF commando and ultramarathon runner

== See also ==
- Turkish Military Academy
- Turkish Air Force Academy
- Education in the Ottoman Empire
