= General Staff Building =

General Staff Building may refers to:

- General Staff Building (Ankara)
- General Staff Building (Moscow)
- General Staff Building (Saint Petersburg)
