= Turkish Armed Forces =

Combined military forces of Turkey

- Türk Silahlı Kuvvetleri
- Emblem of the TAF
- Founded: 3 May 1920; (106 years, 6 months); (Note: As the Army of the Grand National Assembly.)
- Service branches: Turkish Land Forces; Turkish Naval Forces; Turkish Air Force
- Headquarters: General Staff Building, Bakanlıklar, Çankaya, Ankara, Turkey
- Website: www.tsk.tr/HomeEng

Leadership
- Commander-in-Chief: President Recep Tayyip Erdoğan
- Minister of National Defense: Minister Yaşar Güler
- Chief of the General Staff: General Selçuk Bayraktaroğlu

Personnel
- Military age: 20
- Conscription: 6 months
- Active personnel: 481,000
- Reserve personnel: 380,000

Expenditure
- Budget: US$25.0 billion (2024) (ranked 17th)
- Percent of GDP: 2,09% (2024)

Industry
- Domestic suppliers: List SSB; MKEK; Roketsan; Aselsan; TAI; Havelsan; TÜBİTAK; Baykar; STM; BMC; Otokar; FNSS; ARCA Defense; Nurol Makina; Sarsılmaz; GİRSAN; TİSAŞ; Canik Arms; UTAŞ; ASFAT; Meteksan; Kale Group; Transvaro; Gölcük Naval Shipyard; Ares Shipyard; Sedef Shipyard; Sefine Shipyard; DEARSAN; Tusaş Engine Industries; REPKON
- Foreign suppliers: List Germany; South Korea; United States; United Kingdom; Italy; Spain
- Annual exports: $10.054 billion (2025)

Related articles
- History: Military of the Ottoman Empire; Military history of Turkey; List of wars involving Turkey
- Ranks: Military ranks of Turkey

The Turkish Armed Forces (TAF; Turkish: Türk Silahlı Kuvvetleri, TSK) are the military forces of the Republic of Turkey. The TAF consist of the Land Forces, the Naval Forces and the Air Forces. The Chief of the General Staff is the Commander of the Armed Forces. In wartime, the Chief of the General Staff acts as the Commander-in-Chief on behalf of the President, who represents the Supreme Military Command of the TAF on behalf of the Grand National Assembly of Turkey. Coordinating the military relations of the TAF with other NATO member states and friendly states is the responsibility of the General Staff.

The history of the Turkish Armed Forces began with its formation after the collapse of the Ottoman Empire. The Turkish military perceived itself as the guardian of Kemalism, the official state ideology, especially of its emphasis on secularism. After Soviet threats to the Turkish Straits after the Second World War, large amounts of U.S. aid initiated a modernization process. The Turkish Army sent the Turkish Brigade to fight in the Korean War. Towards the end of the 1980s, a second restructuring process was initiated. The Turkish Armed Forces participate in an EU Battlegroup under the control of the European Council, the Italian-Romanian-Turkish Battlegroup. The TAF also contributes operational staff to the Eurocorps multinational army corps initiative of the EU and NATO.

Turkey is the second largest standing military force in NATO, after the United States. Turkey is one of five NATO member states which are part of the nuclear sharing policy of the alliance, together with Belgium, Germany, Italy, and the Netherlands.

As of 2026 Turkey's military budget is $27.34 billion (or 2.33% of GDP), an increase of 30% compared with 2025. The Turkish armed forces employ 481,000 active personnel and 380,000 reserve personnel.

== History ==
=== War of Independence ===
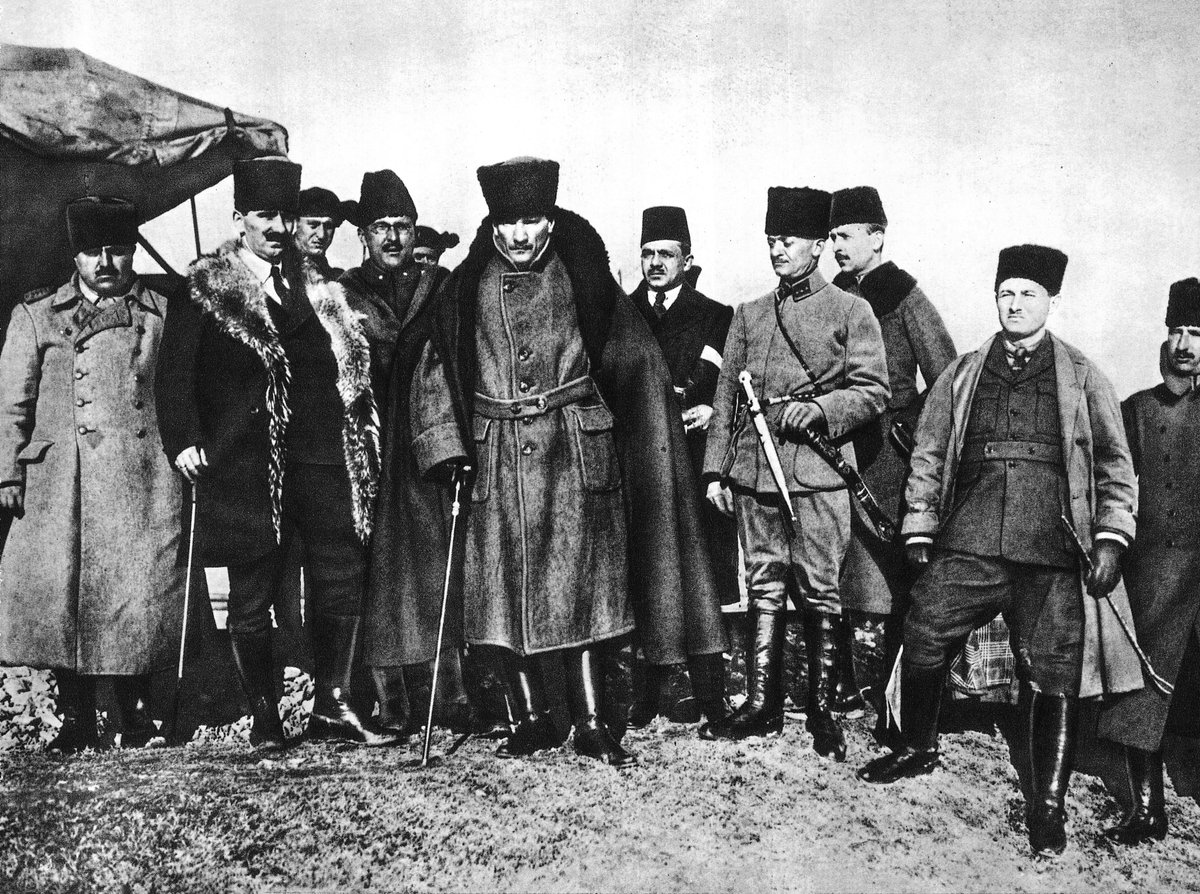
Mustafa Kemal Pasha at the end of the First Battle of İnönü

The Turkish War of Independence (19 May 1919 – 24 July 1923) was a series of military campaigns waged by the Turkish National Movement after parts of the Ottoman Empire were occupied and partitioned following its defeat in World War I. These campaigns were directed against Greece in the west, Armenia in the east, France in the south, loyalists and separatists in various cities, and British and Ottoman troops around Constantinople (Istanbul).

The ethnic demographics of the modern Turkish Republic were significantly impacted by the earlier Armenian genocide and the deportations of Greek-speaking, Orthodox Christian Rum people. The Turkish National Movement carried out massacres and deportations to eliminate native Christian populations – a continuation of the Armenian genocide and other ethnic cleansing operations during World War I. Following these campaigns of ethnic cleansing the historic Christian presence in Anatolia was destroyed, in large part, and the Muslim demographic had increased from 80% to 98%.

While World War I ended for the Ottoman Empire with the Armistice of Mudros, the Allied Powers occupied parts of the empire and sought to prosecute former members of the Committee of Union and Progress and others involved in the Armenian genocide. Ottoman military commanders therefore refused orders from both the Allies and the Ottoman government to surrender and disband their forces. This crisis reached a head when Sultan Mehmed VI dispatched Mustafa Kemal Pasha (Atatürk), a well-respected and high-ranking general, to Anatolia on paper to restore order and enforce the armistice; however, Mustafa Kemal was on a secret mission as an enabler and eventually became the leader of the Turkish National Movement against the Ottoman government, Allied powers, and Christian minorities. On 3 May 1920, Birinci Ferik Mustafa Fevzi Pasha (Çakmak) was appointed the Minister of National Defence, and Mirliva İsmet Pasha (İnönü) was appointed the Minister of the Chief of General Staff of the Government of the Grand National Assembly (GNA).

In an attempt to establish control over the power vacuum in Anatolia, the Allies persuaded Greek Prime Minister Eleftherios Venizelos to launch an expeditionary force into Anatolia and occupy Smyrna (İzmir), beginning the Turkish War of Independence. The nationalist Government of the Grand National Assembly (GNA) led by Mustafa Kemal was established in Ankara when it became clear the Ottoman government was backing the Allied powers. The Allies soon pressured the Ottoman government in Constantinople into suspending the constitution, shuttering the parliament, and signing the Treaty of Sèvres, a treaty that the Ankara government declared illegal.

In the ensuing war, irregular militia defeated the French forces in the south, and demobilized units went on to partition Armenia with Bolshevik forces, resulting in the Treaty of Kars, signed in October 1921. The Western Front of the independence war was known as the Greco-Turkish War, in which Greek forces at first encountered unorganized resistance. However, İsmet Pasha's organization of militia into a regular army paid off when Ankara forces fought the Greeks in the First and Second Battle of İnönü. The Greek army emerged victorious in the Battle of Kütahya-Eskişehir and decided to attack Ankara, stretching their supply lines. On 3 August 1921, the GNA fired İsmet Pasha from the post of Minister of National Defence because of his failure at the Battle of Afyonkarahisar–Eskişehir and on 5 August, just before the Battle of Sakarya, appointed Mustafa Kemal as commander-in-chief of the Army of the GNA. The Turks checked the Greek advance in the Battle of Sakarya and counter-attacked in the Great Offensive, which expelled Greek forces from Anatolia in the span of three weeks. The war effectively ended with the Turkish capture of Smyrna and the Chanak Crisis, prompting the signing of the Armistice of Mudanya.

The Grand National Assembly in Ankara was recognized as the legitimate Turkish government, which signed the Treaty of Lausanne in July 1923. The Allies evacuated Anatolia and Eastern Thrace, and the Ottoman sultanate was subsequently abolished. The Grand National Assembly of Turkey (which remains Turkey's primary legislative body today) declared the Republic of Turkey on 29 October 1923. Further consequences of the war included a population exchange between Greece and Turkey as well as reforms carried out by newly-elected president Mustafa Kemal that developed Turkey into a modern and secular nation-state. On 3 March 1924, the Ottoman caliphate was formally abolished.

=== First Kurdish rebellions ===
There were several rebellions southeastern Turkey in the 1920s and 1930s, the most important of which was the 1925 Sheikh Said rebellion and the 1937 Dersim rebellion. All were suppressed by the TAF, sometimes involving large-scale mobilisations of up to 50,000 troops.

=== World War II ===
Turkey remained neutral until the final stages of World War II. In the initial stage of World War II, Turkey signed a treaty of mutual assistance with Great Britain and France. But after the fall of France, the Turkish government tried to maintain an equal distance with both the Allies and the Axis. Following Nazi Germany's occupation of the Balkans, upon which the Axis-controlled territory in Thrace and the eastern islands of the Aegean Sea bordered Turkey; the Turkish government signed treaties of friendship and non-aggression with Germany on 18 June 1941.

After the German invasion of the Soviet Union, the Turkish government sent a military delegation of observers under Lieutenant General Ali Fuat Erden to Germany and the Eastern Front. Following the German retreat from the Caucasus, the Turkish government then moved closer to the Allies and Winston Churchill secretly met with İsmet İnönü at the Adana Conference in Yenice Train Station in southern Turkey on 30 January 1943, with the intent of persuading Turkey to join the war on the side of the Allies. A few days before the start of Operation Zitadelle in July 1943, the Turkish government sent a military delegation under General Cemil Cahit Toydemir to Russia and observed the exercises of the 503rd Heavy Panzer Battalion and its equipment. But after the failure of Operation Zitadelle, the Turkish government participated in the Second Cairo Conference in December 1943, where Franklin D. Roosevelt, Churchill and İnönü reached an agreement on issues regarding Turkey's possible contribution to the Allies. On 23 February 1945, Turkey joined the Allies by declaring war against Germany and Japan, after it was announced at the Yalta Conference that only the states which were formally at war with Germany and Japan by 1 March 1945 would be admitted to the United Nations.

=== Korean War ===
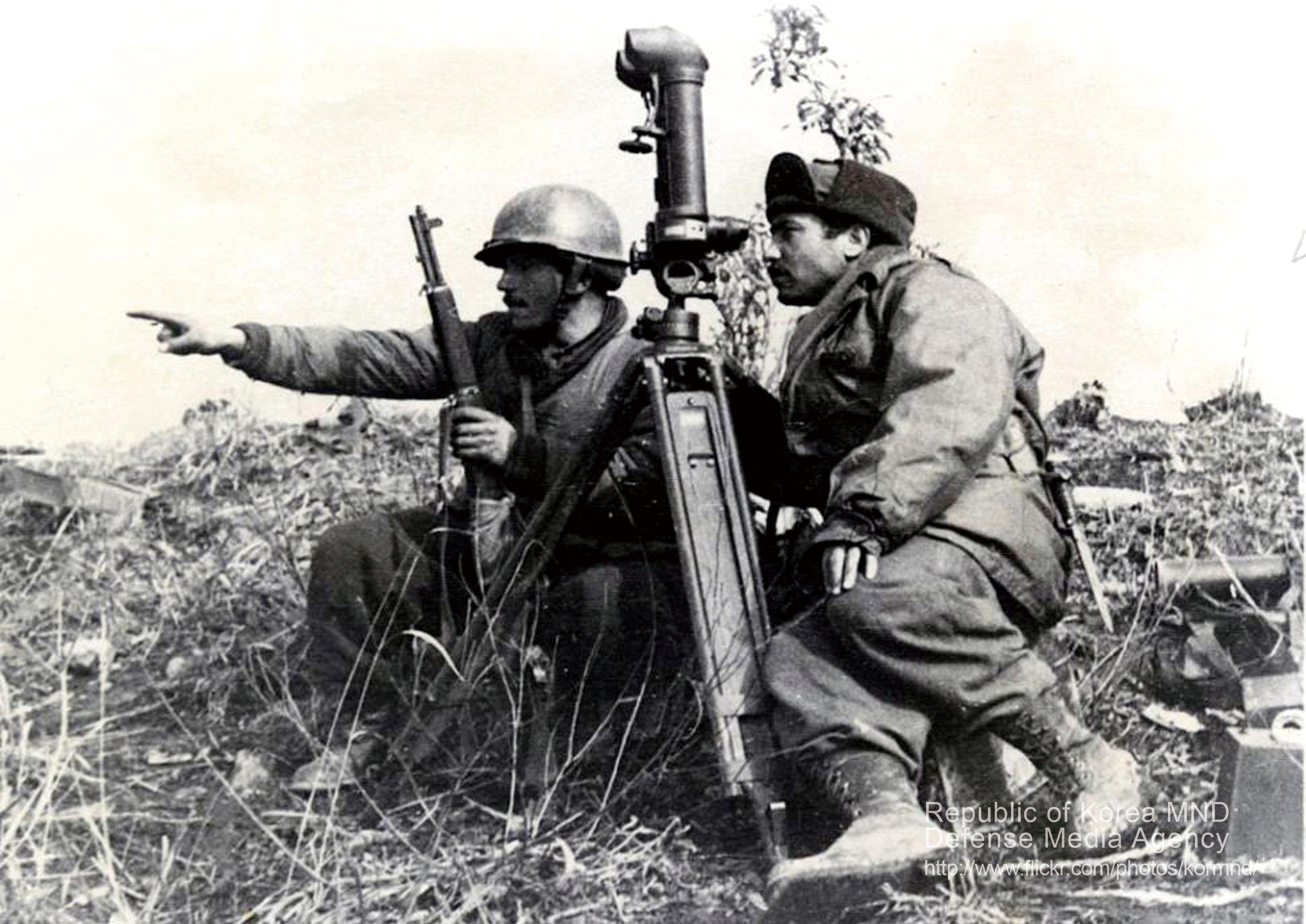
Turkish soldiers observing the front during the Korean War

Turkey participated in the Korean War as a member state of the United Nations and sent the Turkish Brigade to South Korea, and suffered 731 losses while displaying exceptional valor in combat. On 18 February 1952, Turkey became a member of NATO. The South Korean government donated a war memorial for Turkish soldiers who fought and died in Korea. The Korean pagoda was donated in 1973 for the 50th anniversary of the Turkish Republic and is located in Ankara.

After lengthy discussions, including with the United States, a ten-year program of reorganization and modernization of their armed forces was finally launched by the Turks in 1972. "This $2.9 billion plan was to be funded about 48 percent from Turkish sources and the remainder from foreign, principally [U.S.], assistance. The program was designed to bring the Turkish armed forces -- particularly combat units -- more closely into harmony with current US concepts. It placed the principal emphasis on modernizing ground force equipment, but it also provided for the purchase of 40 McDonnell Douglas F-4 Phantom IIs, ultimately with U.S. credit assistance."

=== Cyprus ===
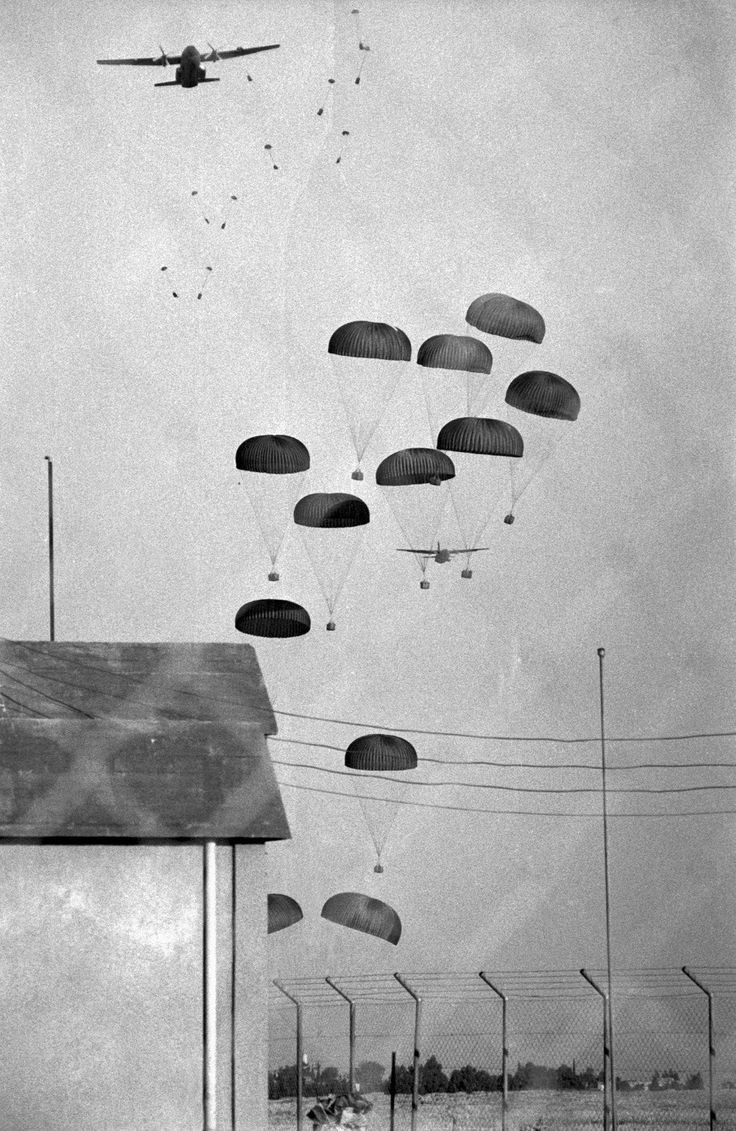
Turkish paratroopers jump from military transport aircraft during the air landing operation off the coast of Kyrenia in the initial part of the Atilla Operations (July 20, 1974).

On 20 July 1974, the TAF launched an amphibious and airborne assault operation on Cyprus, in response to the 1974 Cypriot coup d'état which had been staged by EOKA-B and the Cypriot National Guard against president Makarios III with the intention of annexing the island to Greece; but the military intervention ended up with Turkey occupying a considerable area on the northern part of Cyprus and helping to establish a local government of Turkish Cypriots there, which has thus far been recognized only by Turkey. The intervention came after more than a decade of intercommunal violence (1963–1974) between the island's Greek Cypriots and Turkish Cypriots, resulting from the constitutional breakdown of 1963. Turkey invoked its role as a guarantor under the Treaty of Guarantee in justification for the military intervention. Turkish forces landed on the island in two waves, invading and occupying 37% of the island's territory in the northeast for the Turkish Cypriots, who had been isolated in small enclaves across the island prior to the military intervention.

In the aftermath, the Turkish Cypriots declared a separate political entity in the form of the Turkish Federated State of Cyprus in 1975; and in 1983 made a unilateral declaration of independence as the Turkish Republic of Northern Cyprus, which is recognized only by Turkey to this day. The United Nations continues to recognize the sovereignty of the Republic of Cyprus according to the terms of its independence in 1960. The conflict continues to overshadow Turkish relations with Greece and with the European Union. In 2004, during the referendum for the Annan Plan for Cyprus (a United Nations proposal to resolve the Cyprus dispute) 76% of the Greek Cypriots rejected the proposal, while 65% of the Turkish Cypriots accepted it.

=== Kurdish–Turkish conflict ===
The TAF are in a protracted campaign against the PKK (recognized as a terrorist organization by the United States, the European Union and NATO) which has involved frequent forays into neighbouring Iraq and Syria. The leader of the terrorist organisation PKK; Abdullah Öcalan was arrested in 1999 in Nairobi Kenya, taken to Turkey and publicly trialed for several crimes. In 2015, the PKK cancelled their one-sided 2013 ceasefire after tension due to various events (Hendek Operasyonları) and threatened to attack dams in Turkey.

=== War in Bosnia and Kosovo ===
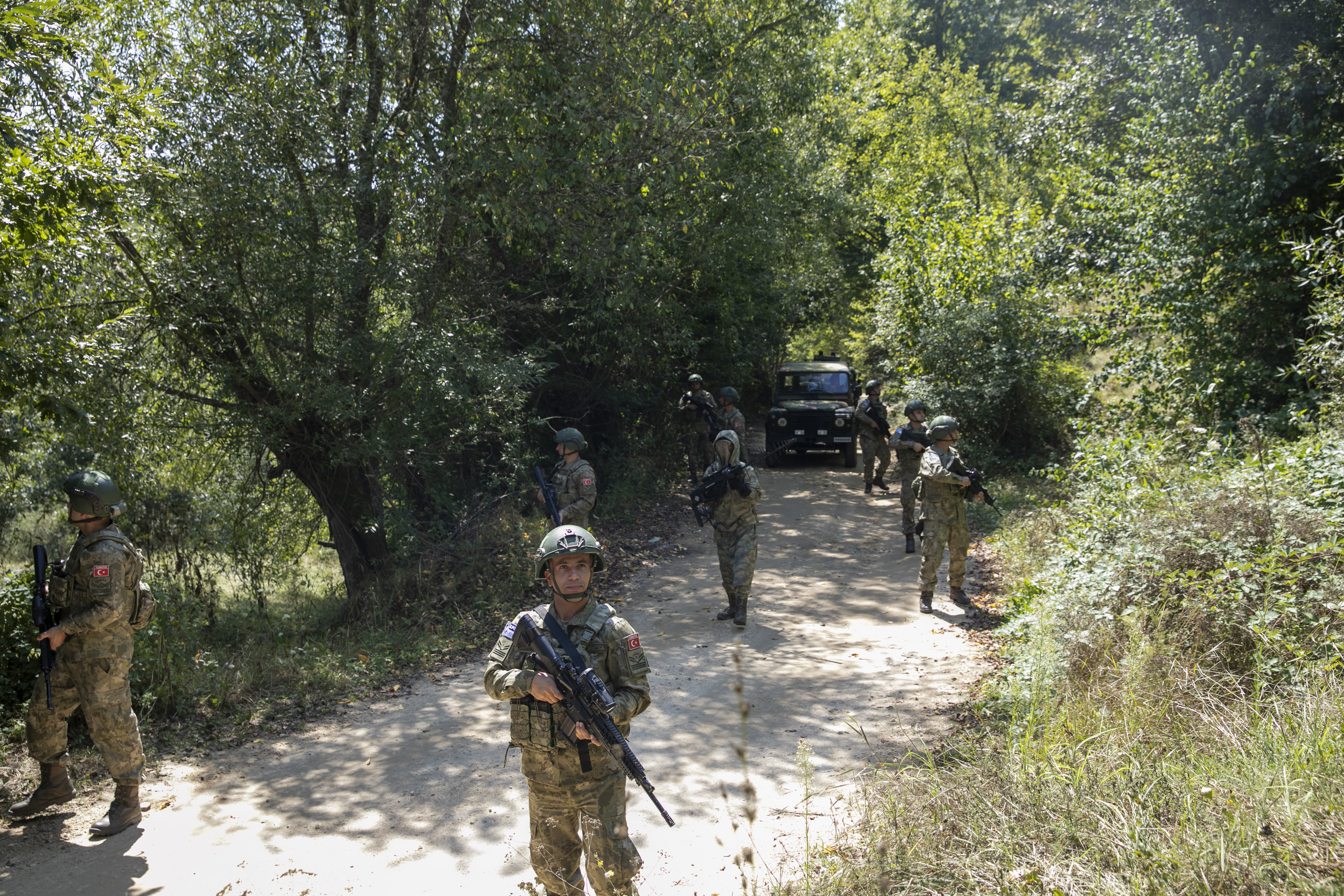
TAF soldiers during a KFOR patrol

Turkey contributed troops in several NATO-led peace forces in Bosnia and Kosovo. Currently there are 402 Turkish troops in Kosovo Force.

=== War in Afghanistan ===
After the 2003 Istanbul Bombings were linked to Al-Qaeda, Turkey deployed troops to Afghanistan to fight Taliban forces and Al-Qaeda operatives, with the hopes of dismantling both groups. Turkey's responsibilities included providing security in Kabul (it formerly led Regional Command Capital), as well as in Wardak Province, where it led PRT Maidan Shahr. Turkey was once the third largest contingent within the International Security Assistance Force. Turkey's troops were not engaged in combat operations and Ankara has long resisted pressure from Washington to offer more combat troops. According to the Washington Post, in December 2009, after US President Barack Obama announced he would deploy 30,000 more U.S. soldiers, and that Washington wants others to follow suit, Turkish Prime Minister Recep Tayyip Erdoğan reacted with the message that Turkey would not contribute additional troops to Afghanistan. "Turkey has already done what it can do by boosting its contingent of soldiers there to 1,750 from around 700 without being asked", said Erdoğan, who stressed that Turkey would continue its training of Afghan security forces.

Turkey withdrew their troops from Afghanistan after the fall of Kabul (2021).

=== Cross-border operations in the Middle East ===
==== Syria ====
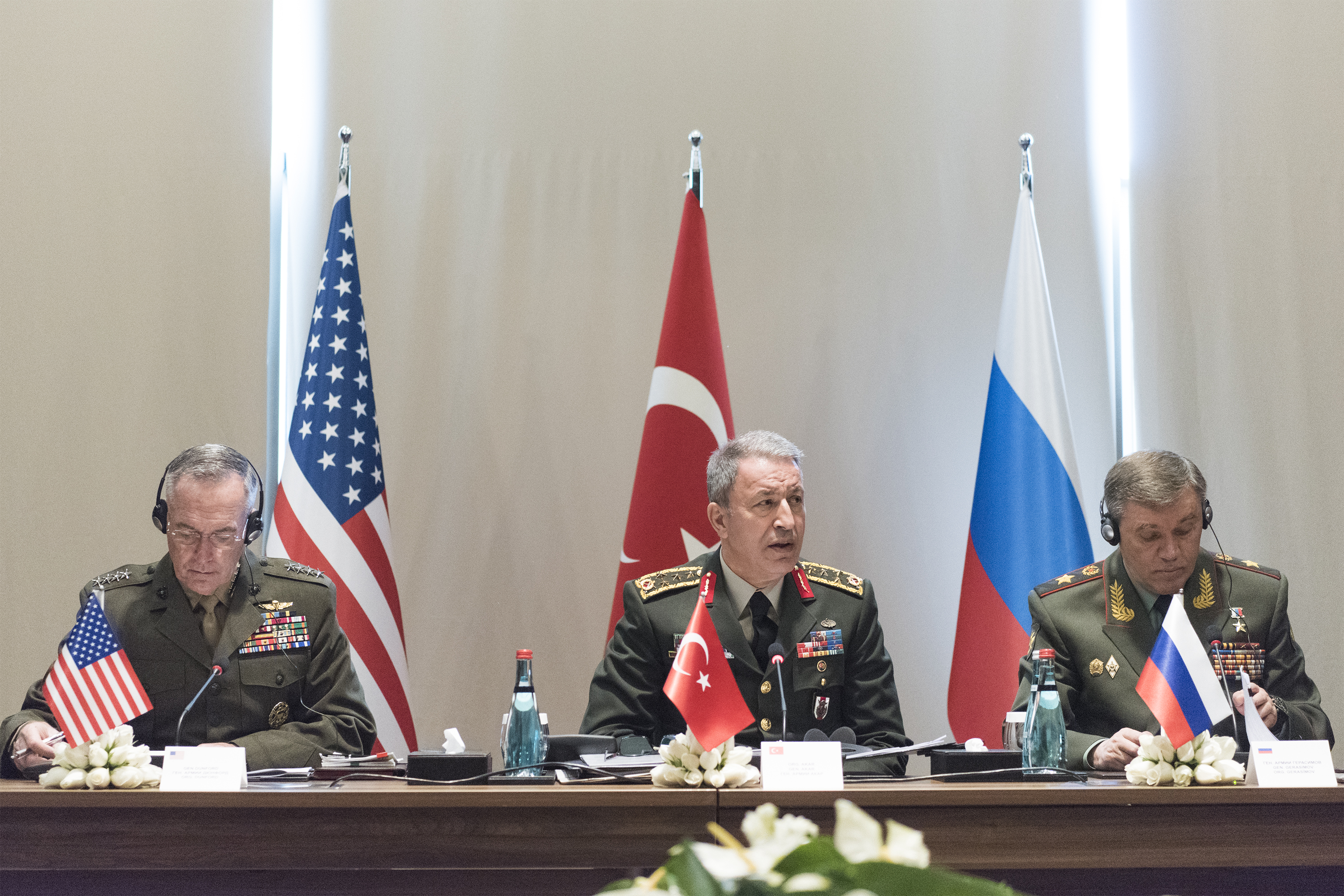
Marine Corps Gen. Joseph Dunford Jr. (left) chairman of the Joint Chiefs of Staff, participates in a trilateral meeting with Gen. Hulusi Akar of the Turkish army (center) and Gen. Valery Gerasimov of the Russian army in Antalya, Turkey, March 6, 2017. The three chiefs of defense are discussing their nations' operations in northern Syria.

The TAF have carried out major military operations against ISIS, YPG and the Assad Regime in Syria; Operation Euphrates Shield in 2016, Operation Olive Branch in 2018, Operation Peace Spring in 2019 and Operation Spring Shield in 2020. As a result of these operations, regions as Jarabulus, Al-Bab, Tell Abyad, Ras al-Ayn and Afrin were captured by Rebel Forces of the Syrian Interim Government and TAF.

The TAF implemented new tactics and techniques like the mass use of Unmanned Aerial Vehicles. Thanks to these drone raids, which were used in coordination with electronic warfare, systems such as the Pantsir and Buk used by Ba'athist Syria were neutralized. International relations and policy think tanks as the Middle East Institute, Institute for the Study of War, Rand Corporation, Jamestown Foundation and many military analysts stated that the TAF have made significant changes in military doctrines and have created a new military approach based on drones and electronic warfare with the military operations it has carried out or helped to carry out in regions such as Syria, Libya, Iraq and Karabakh. The developments it has made in drone technology in particular have been interpreted as Turkey's defense industry and armed forces becoming among the world's leading forces.

=== Humanitarian relief ===
The TAF have performed "Disaster Relief Operations," as in the 1999 İzmit earthquake in the Marmara region of Turkey. Apart from contributing to NATO, the Turkish Navy also contributes to the Black Sea Naval Co-operation Task Group, which was created in early 2001 by Turkey, Bulgaria, Georgia, Romania, Russia and Ukraine for search and rescue and other humanitarian operations in the Black Sea.

== Structure ==
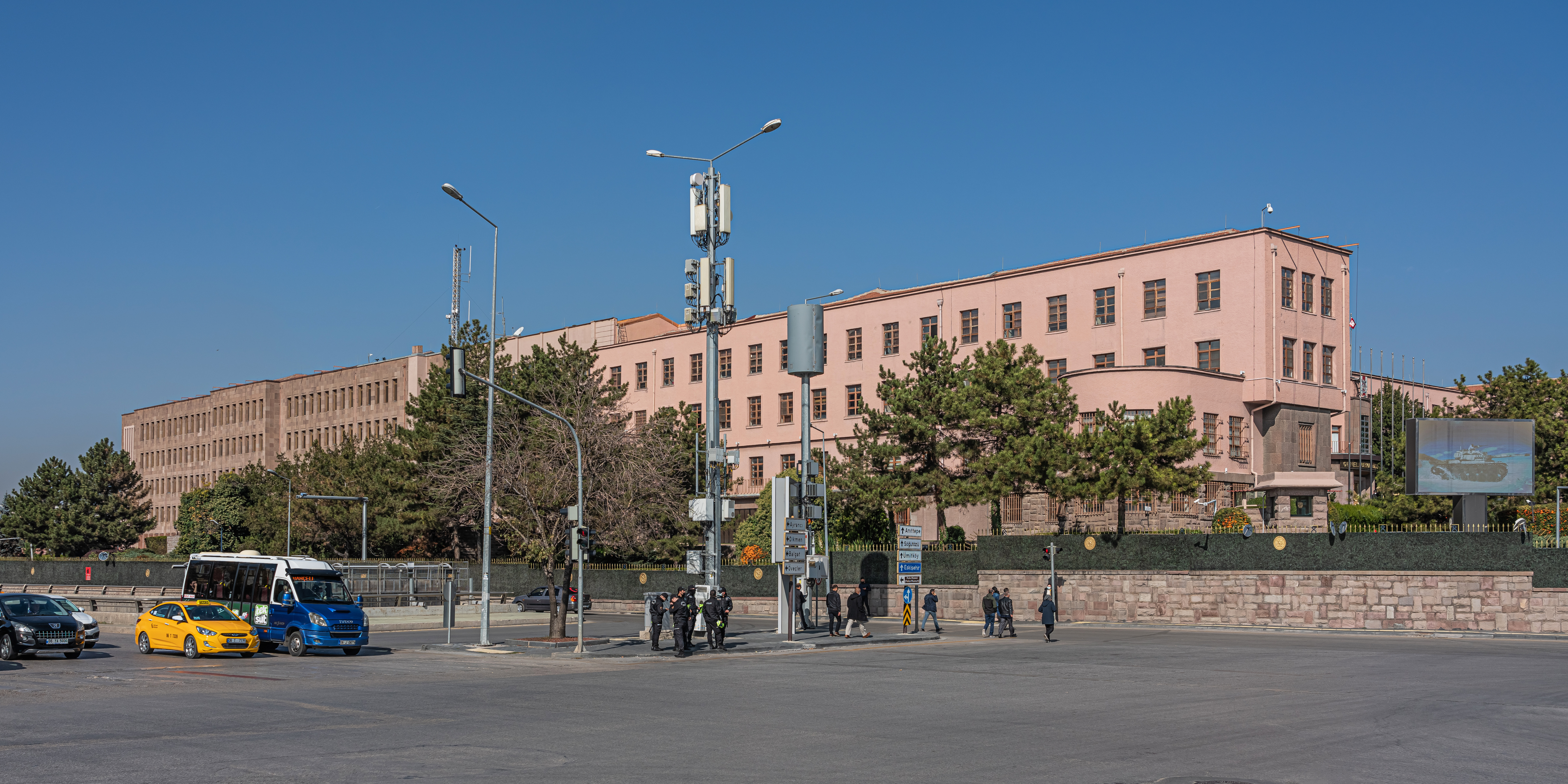
The General Staff Building, situated in Çankaya, is the headquarters of the Turkish Armed Forces.

Publicly available audit by the Court of Accounts in 2023 suggests that the Turkish Armed Forces consisted of 210,989 military staff in active service and 121,161 in reserve duties, aggregating a total of 332,150. The term reserve describes those in mandatory service under officer, non-commissioned officer, and enlisted positions. By a 2016 reorganisation, the Gendarmerie General Command and the Coast Guard Command were subordinated to the Ministry of Interior and therefore, their personnel count is no longer included within the military.

The Turkish Armed Forces is headed by the Chief of the General Staff, the principal military officer. It reports to the Minister of National Defense, a cabinet-level civilian position. The service branches, the Land Forces, the Naval Forces, and the Air Force, all subordinate to the ministry under operational supervision of the General Staff. In contrast to the rest of the military, where all elements are bound to a service branch, the Special Forces Command is responsible to the General Staff.

As of 2024, there are 327 general officers. The positions are dominated by the Land Forces, while the Air Force is the smallest service branch. In 2016, the Turkish Armed Forces had 326 generals, which plunged to 196 following the 2016 Turkish coup attempt. Although the military suffered personnel shortage, it over the years managed to restore its staff capacity. The cadres were all-male dominated, albeit there was no restriction on women. In 2022, Özlem Yılmaz made history by getting promoted to brigadier general within the gendarmerie. The next year, the Naval Forces received its first female rear admiral.

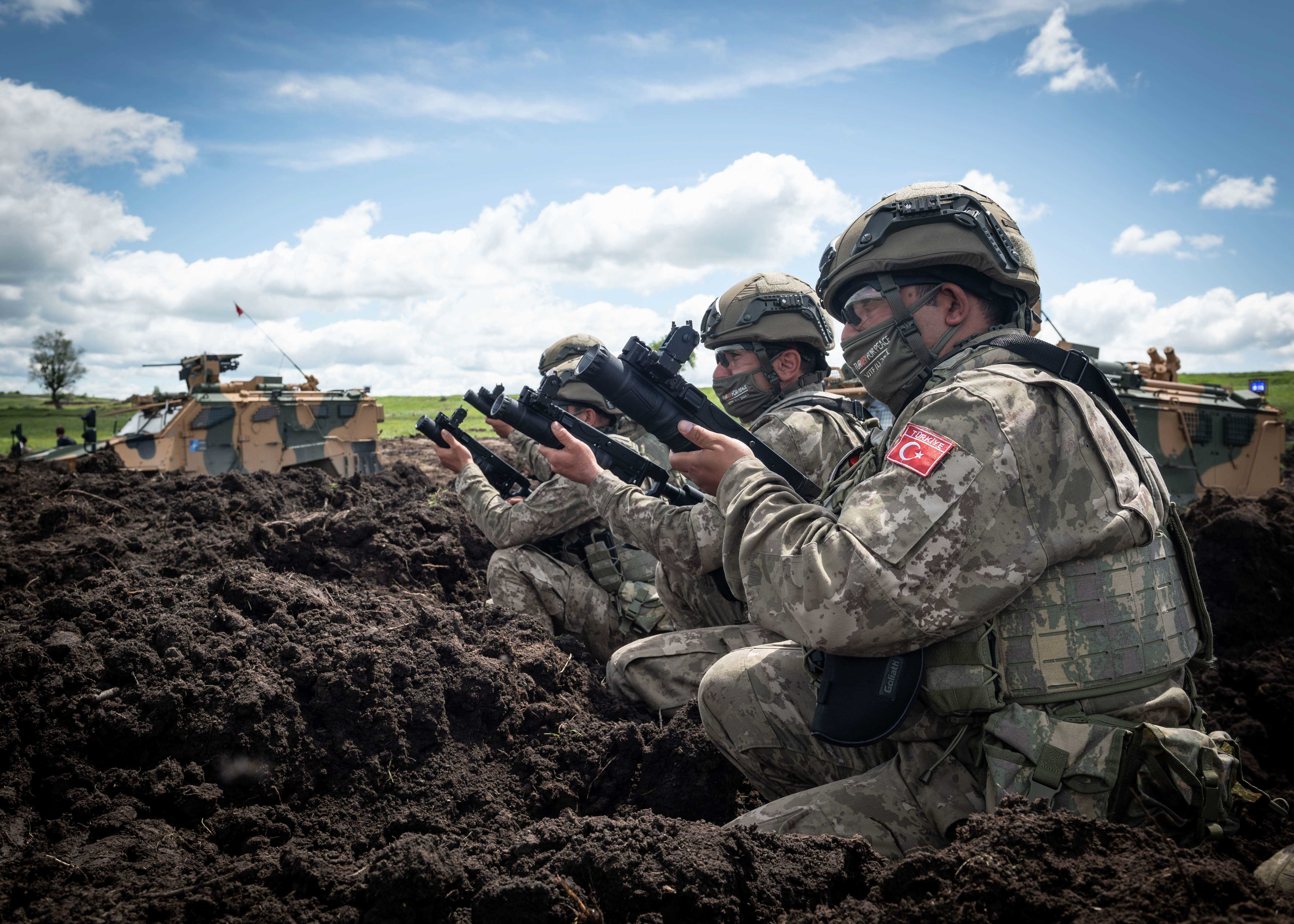
Turkish soldiers utilize indigenous grenade launchers during a multinational exercise in Romania.

=== Land Forces ===
The Land Forces Command (Turkish: Kara Kuvvetleri Komutanlığı) is the largest service branch of the Turkish Armed Forces, superdominating the other branches. It was de facto established in 1920, during the Turkish War of Independence, as a merger of the pre-existing irregular Kuva-yi Milliye forces. The government, however, acknowledges 209 BC as the symbolic date it was founded ─ the year when Mete Khan ascended to the throne of the Xiongnu Empire. His heritage stands well-appreciated in Turkish historiography for the contributions to the later Turkish know-how, as he is thought to be the first Turkic ruler to introduce the local tribes into a complex military entity.

In 2022, the force is composed of four armies, nine corps, eight commando brigades, one mountain commando brigade, seven armoured brigades, 14 mechanised brigades, seven motorised infantry brigades, and three artillery brigades.

Combatant commands

- First Army, Istanbul
- Second Army, Malatya
- Third Army, Erzincan
- Aegean Army, İzmir

Support commands

- Training and Doctrine Command
- Logistics Command
- Army Aviation Command
- Air Defence Command
- CBRN Defence & Security Command

Headquarters service units

- Personnel Command
- Intelligence Command
- Operations Command
- General Planning & Principles Command
- Communications & IT Command

As of 2026, Turkish land forces include 2,284 tanks, 98,193 vehicles, 1,045 self-propelled artillery, 635 towed artillery, and 237 MLRS launchers.

=== Naval Forces ===
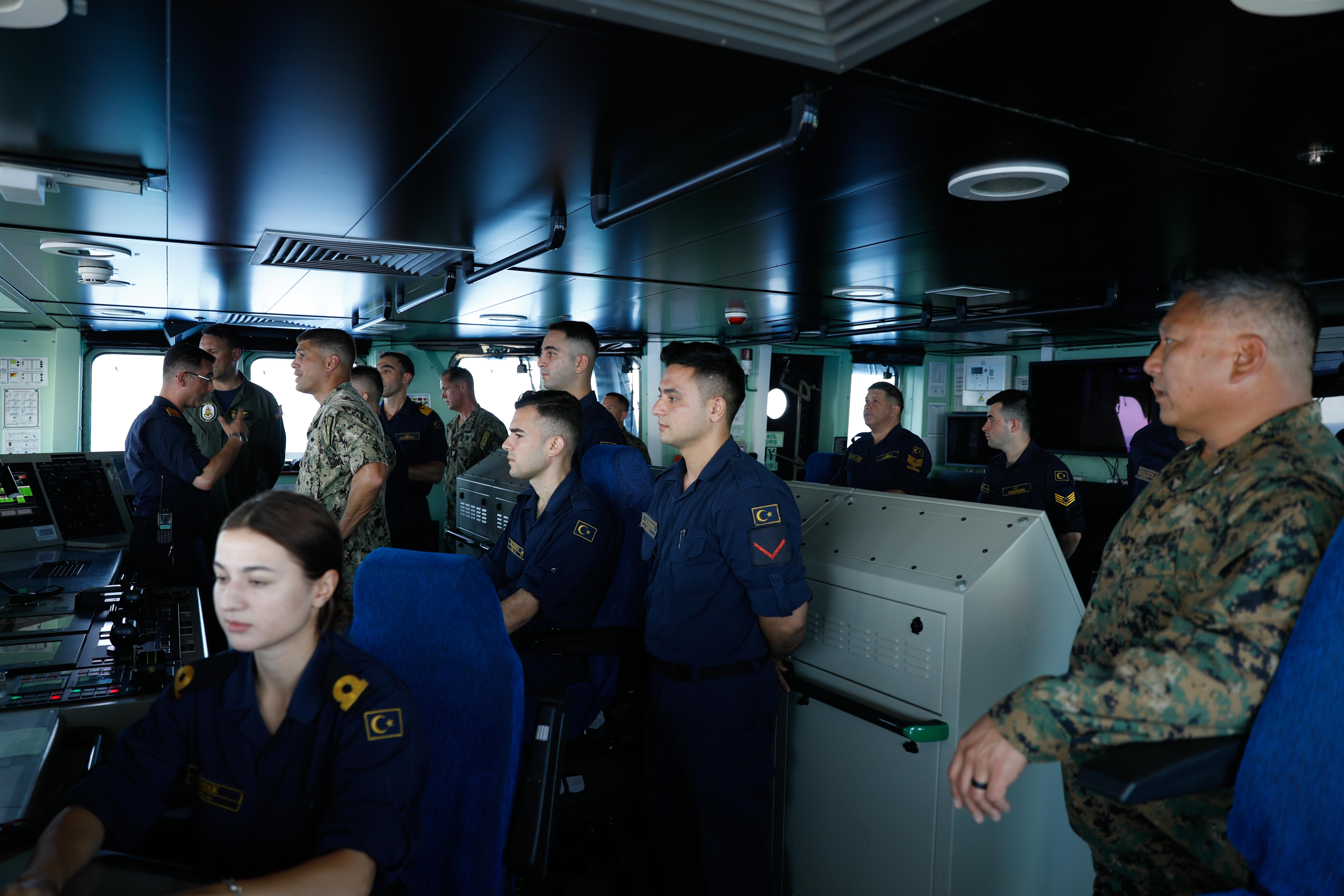
Senior leaders of the USS Wasp Amphibious Ready Group tour the bridge of amphibious assault ship TCG Anadolu (L400) in 2024.

The Turkish Naval Forces, or Turkish Navy, constitutes the naval warfare service branch of the Turkish Armed Forces. The Turkish Navy maintains several Marines and Special Operations units. The Amphibious Marines Brigade (Amfibi Deniz Piyade Tugayı) based in Foça near İzmir consists of 4,500 men, three amphibious battalions, an MBT battalion, an artillery battalion, a support battalion and other company-sized units. The Su Altı Taarruz (S.A.T. – Underwater Attack) is dedicated to missions including the acquisition of military intelligence, amphibious assault, counter-terrorism and VIP protection; while the Su Altı Savunma (S.A.S. – Underwater Defense) is dedicated to coastal defense operations (such as clearing mines or unexploded torpedoes) and disabling enemy vessels or weapons with underwater operations; as well as counter-terrorism and VIP protection missions.

As of 2026, Turkish naval power include 1 helicopter carrier, 17 frigates, 9 corvettes, 14 submarines, 40 patrol vessels, and 11 mine warfare ships.

=== Air Force ===
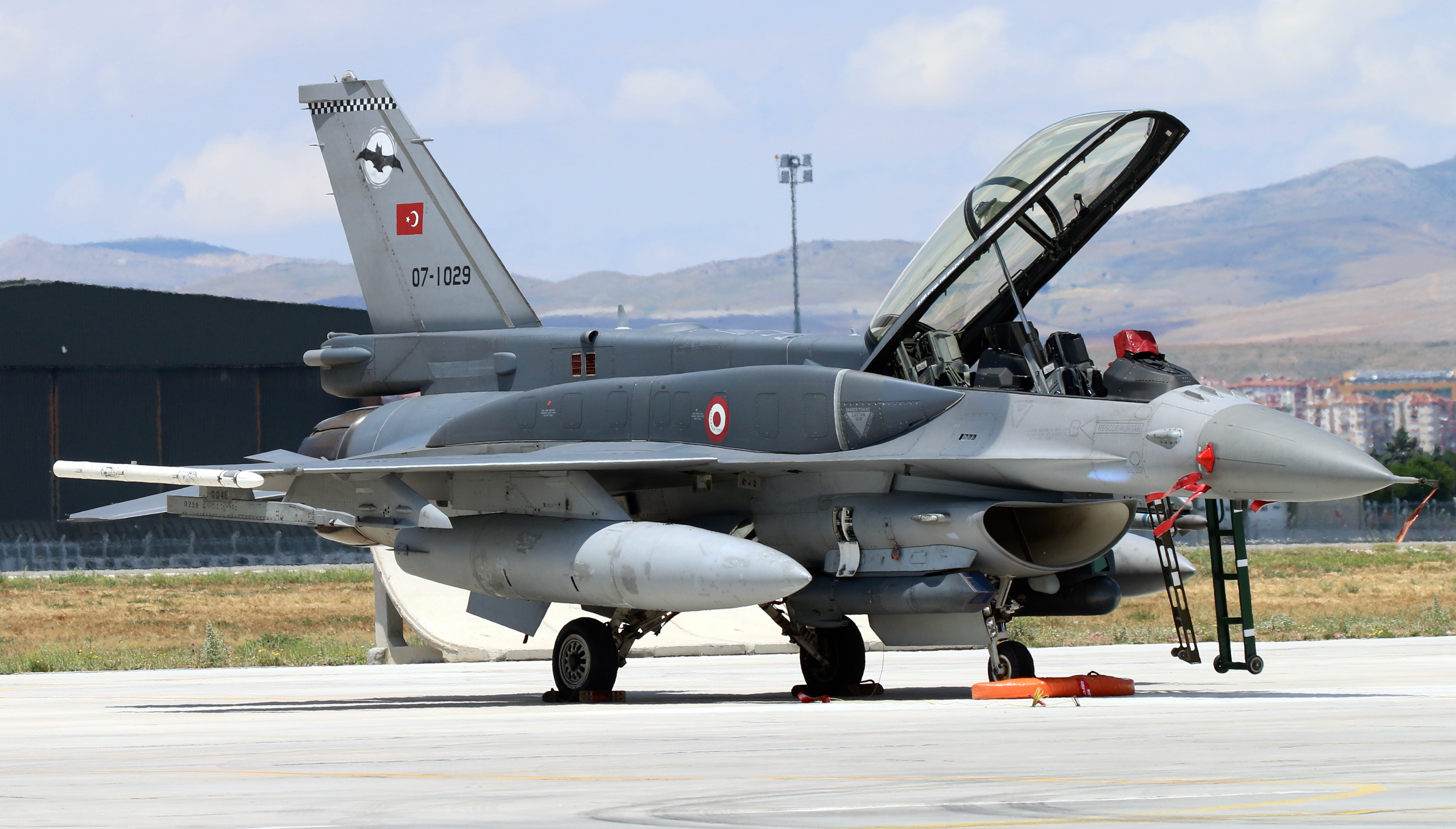
Turkish F-16D Block 50

The Turkish Air Force is the aerial warfare service branch of the Turkish Armed Forces. It is primarily responsible for the protection and sovereignty of Turkish airspace but also provides air-power to the other service branches. Turkey is one of five NATO member states which are part of the nuclear sharing policy of the alliance, together with Belgium, Germany, Italy, and the Netherlands. A total of 90 B61 nuclear bombs are hosted at the Incirlik Air Base, 40 of which are allocated for use by the Turkish Air Force in case of a nuclear conflict, but their use requires the approval of NATO.

The Air Force took part in the Operation Deliberate Force of 1995 and Operation Allied Force of 1999, and later participated in the United Nations peacekeeping mission in Bosnia-Herzegovina, employing two squadrons (one in the Ghedi fighter wing, and after 2000 one in the Aviano fighter wing.) They returned to Turkey in 2001. In 2006, 4 Turkish F-16 fighter jets were deployed for NATO's Baltic Air Policing operation.

== Military bases and soldiers stationed abroad ==
As of February 2021, Turkey has at least over 50,000+ military personnel stationed outside its territory. The only military base stationed permanently abroad, regardless of the organizations that are members of Turkey, which has been temporarily holding troops several times abroad due to its responsibilities arising from many international political members, particularly NATO membership, is the Cyprus Turkish Peace Force Command. The military bases of the Turkish Armed Forces in Qatar, Syria, Somalia and Bashiqa, among an unknown number of other bases internationally, are currently active. It was announced in 2017 that Turkey would start working on establishing a research base in Antarctica.

According to a study conducted in England, Turkey has the largest deployment of international troops after the United States, with an estimated strength of at least 60,000+ military personnel stationed outside of the borders of Turkey. This means that 1 in 6 of the active military troops of Turkey (which is estimated to be 355,200 in 2020) are deployed outside of the borders of the country.

Turkey currently has a military presence in the following countries;

Countries with Turkish military bases, facilities and troops

- Albania – 24 troops in Pasha Liman Base, with 2 frigates. An Albanian-Turkish military cooperation agreement was signed in 1992 that encompassed rebuilding Albania's Pasha Liman Base by Turkey alongside granted access for Turkish use.
- Azerbaijan – Buildings and structures in Gizil Sherg military town, and one terminal building located in the airfield in Hacı Zeynalabdin settlement. An observation base was also built by Turkey in the Nagorno-Karabakh region after the 44-day 2020 Nagorno-Karabakh war. The base was established in Aghdam under the name "Ceasefire Observation Center", and officially started to operate in January 2021 with 60 Turkish and Russian soldiers stationed at the base.
- Bosnia and Herzegovina – Under EUROFOR Operation Althea 242 troops, previously under Implementation Force and Stabilisation Force in Bosnia and Herzegovina at Mehmet The Conqueror Barracks.
- Iraq – Turkey has signed agreement with Iraq which includes allowing the Turkish army to pursue elements of the Kurdistan Workers' Party (PKK) in northern Iraq, with the permission of, and in coordination with the Federal Government of Iraq. It also includes opening two liaison offices between Baghdad and Ankara to exchange intelligence and security information between the two countries. As of 2020, Turkey has a military base with 2,000 personnel in Bashiqa and Bamarni Air Base garrisoned with around 60 tanks, Armoured personnel carriers and one commando battalion. Turkey has more than 40+ military and intelligence bases scattered all around Iraq, the most out of any country. There are plans to build a new base in the Metina area of Duhok governorate in Kurdistan Region as of April 2021. In total, Turkey has stationed around 5,000 to 10,000 soldiers in Iraq.
- Kosovo – An estimated 321 troops serve in the Kosovo Security Battalion command. They are stationed at Sultan Murat base in the city of Prizren for UNMIK mission and KFOR peacekeeping force's.
- Libya – Airbases at al-Watiya, Mitiga and Misrata, in addition to Zwara. The number of Turkish soldiers stationed in Libya is unknown.
- Northern Cyprus – A total of 35,000 to 40,000 armed forces of the Republic of Turkey are currently in active duty Cyprus Turkish Peace Force Command.
- Qatar – A military base in Doha with 5,000 personnel.
- Somalia – Camp TURKSOM with 2,000 personnel.
- Syria – Bases in Al-Bab, Al-Rai, Akhtarin, Afrin, Jindires, Rajo and Jarablus with at least 5,000 personnel in Euphrates Shield and Olive Branch regions. New bases were followed at south of Afrin canton in Atme and Darat Izza There are 114 Turkish bases in Syria as of January 2022. After operation Peace Spring, approximately 6,400 personnel are working around the Peace Spring region between Ras al-Ayn and Tell Abyad. 19 observation points are settled around Idlib and Aleppo Province. Altogether, there are an estimated 10,500 Turkish soldiers and 250 tanks stationed in Syria. These numbers are constantly subject to modifications.

Turkey additionally has a presence in the following countries through UN peacekeeping missions:

- Central African Republic – 50 Turkish soldiers are stationed in the CAR as part of the UN Multidimensional Integrated Stabilization Mission (MINUSCA).
- Democratic Republic of the Congo – 152 units for MONUSCO mission.
- Lebanon – 100 Personnel for UNIFIL mission and Maritime Task Force (MTF) participant units.
- Mali – 50 Turkish soldiers are serving in Mali as part of the UN Multidimensional Integrated Stabilization Mission (MINUSMA).

== Role of the military in Turkish politics ==
After the Republic of Turkey was founded in 1923, Mustafa Kemal Atatürk prohibited the political activities of officers in active service with the Military Penal Code numbered 1632 and dated 22 May 1930 (Askeri Ceza Kanunu). However, after the 1960 coup d'état, the Millî Birlik Komitesi (National Unity Committee) established the Inner Service Act of the Turkish Armed Forces (Türk Silahlı Kuvvetleri İç Hizmet Kanunu) on 4 January 1961 to legitimize their military interventions in politics. In subsequent coups d'état and coup d'état attempts, they showed reasons to justify their political activities especially with the article 35 and 85 of this act.

The Turkish military perceived itself as the guardian of Kemalism, the official state ideology, especially of its secular aspects. The TAF still maintains an important degree of influence over the decision-making process regarding issues related to Turkish national security, albeit decreased in the past decades, via the National Security Council.

The military had a record of intervening in politics, removing elected governments four times in the past. Indeed, it assumed power for several periods in the latter half of the 20th century. It executed three coups d'état: in 1960 (27 May coup), in 1971 (12 March coup), and in 1980 (12 September coup). Following the 1960 coup d'état, the military executed the first democratically elected prime minister in Turkey, Adnan Menderes, in 1961. Most recently, it maneuvered the removal of an Islamist prime minister, Necmettin Erbakan, in 1997 (known as the 28 February memorandum). Contrary to outsider expectations, the Turkish populace was not uniformly averse to coups; many welcomed the ejection of governments they perceived as unconstitutional.

On 27 April 2007, in advance of the 4 November 2007 presidential election, and in reaction to the politics of Abdullah Gül, who has a past record of involvement in Islamist political movements and banned Islamist parties such as the Welfare Party, the army issued a statement of its interests. It said that the army is a party to "arguments" regarding secularism; that Islamism ran counter to the secular nature of Turkey, and to the legacy of Mustafa Kemal Atatürk. The Army's statement ended with a clear warning that the TAF stood ready to intervene if the secular nature of the Turkish Constitution is compromised, stating that "the Turkish Armed Forces maintain their sound determination to carry out their duties stemming from laws to protect the unchangeable characteristics of the Republic of Turkey. Their loyalty to this determination is absolute."

Over a hundred people, including several generals, have been detained or questioned since July 2008 with respect to the so-called organisation Ergenekon, an alleged clandestine, ultra-nationalist organization with ties to members of the country's military and security forces. The group is accused of terrorism in Turkey. These accusing claims are reported, even while the trials are going on, mostly in the counter-secular and Islamist media organs.

On 22 February 2010 more than 40 officers were arrested and then formally charged with attempting to overthrow the government with respect to the so-called "Sledgehammer" plot. They include four admirals, a general and two colonels, some of them retired, including former commanders of the Turkish navy and air force (three days later, the former commanders of the navy and air force were released). Partially as a result, the Washington Post reported in April 2010 that the military's power had decreased.

On the eve of the Supreme Military Council of August 2011, the Chief of the General Staff, along with the Army, Navy, and Air Force commanders, requested their retirement, in protest of the mass arrests which they perceived as a deliberate and planned attack against the Kemalist and secular-minded officers of the Turkish Armed Forces by the Islamists in Turkey, who began to control key positions in the Turkish government, judiciary and police. The swift replacement of the force commanders in the Supreme Military Council meeting affirmed the government's control over the appointment of top-level commanders. However, promotions continue to be determined by the General Staff with limited civilian control. The European Commission, in its 2011 regular yearly report on Turkey's progress towards EU accession, stated that "further reforms on the composition and powers of the Supreme Military Council, particularly on the legal basis of promotions, still need to materialise." The service branch commanders continue to report to the Prime Minister instead of the Defence Minister.

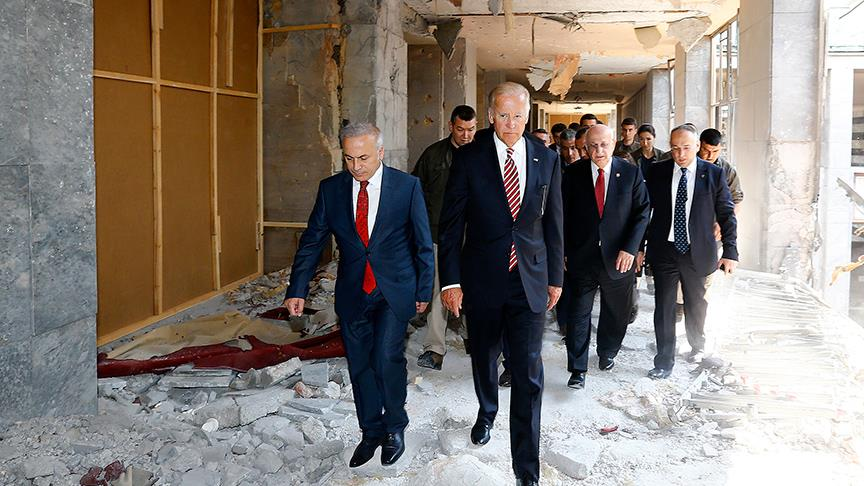
Then-Vice President Joe Biden inspects damage to the Grand National Assembly during a visit to Ankara on 24 August 2016.

In July 2016, a faction within the Turkish Armed Forces attempted to take over the government, but Erdogan supporters and other loyal military units stopped the coup attempt. The parliament house, police headquarters, and some other buildings in Ankara were damaged by aerial bombing and attack helicopter gunfire. In Istanbul, the Bosporus Bridge was blocked, a tank fired a shell, and soldiers shot at people. The incidents caused the death of hundreds and wounding of thousands of unarmed civilians. Following the failed coup attempt, thousands of military personnel were arrested and the structure of the armed forces was overhauled. The total toll of the damages to the economy amounted to US$14 billion.

On August 30, 2024, which is celebrated as "Victory Day" in Turkey, a graduation ceremony was conducted for the academy's finishing class. During the ceremony, 960 graduates, led by valedictorian Ebru Eroğlu, recited the military oath to defend Turkey. The event was attended by Turkish President Recep Tayyip Erdoğan. Approximately one hour following the graduation, Eroglu and 400 other graduates were recorded raising their swords and pledging allegiance to Mustafa Kemal Atatürk, the secular founder of modern Turkey. The group subsequently took an oath to uphold "a secular, democratic Turkey." In response, eight days later, Erdogan announced the initiation of an investigation and declared that "the few impertinent individuals responsible will be purged."

== Medals and berets ==
- Turkish Armed Forces Medal of Honor
- Turkish Armed Forces Medal of Distinguished Service
- Turkish Armed Forces Medal of Distinguished Courage and Self-Sacrifice
- Turkish Armed Forces Medal of Bravery and Valour
- Turkish Armed Forces State Medal of Honor

Colour	Wearer
Black	Armoured Corps.
Blue	Commando Brigades.
Sky blue	Personnel serving in United Nations missions.
Brown	Formal Dress.
Green	Gendarmerie General Command.
Maroon	Special Forces Command.
Navy	General Directorate of Security

== Gallery ==
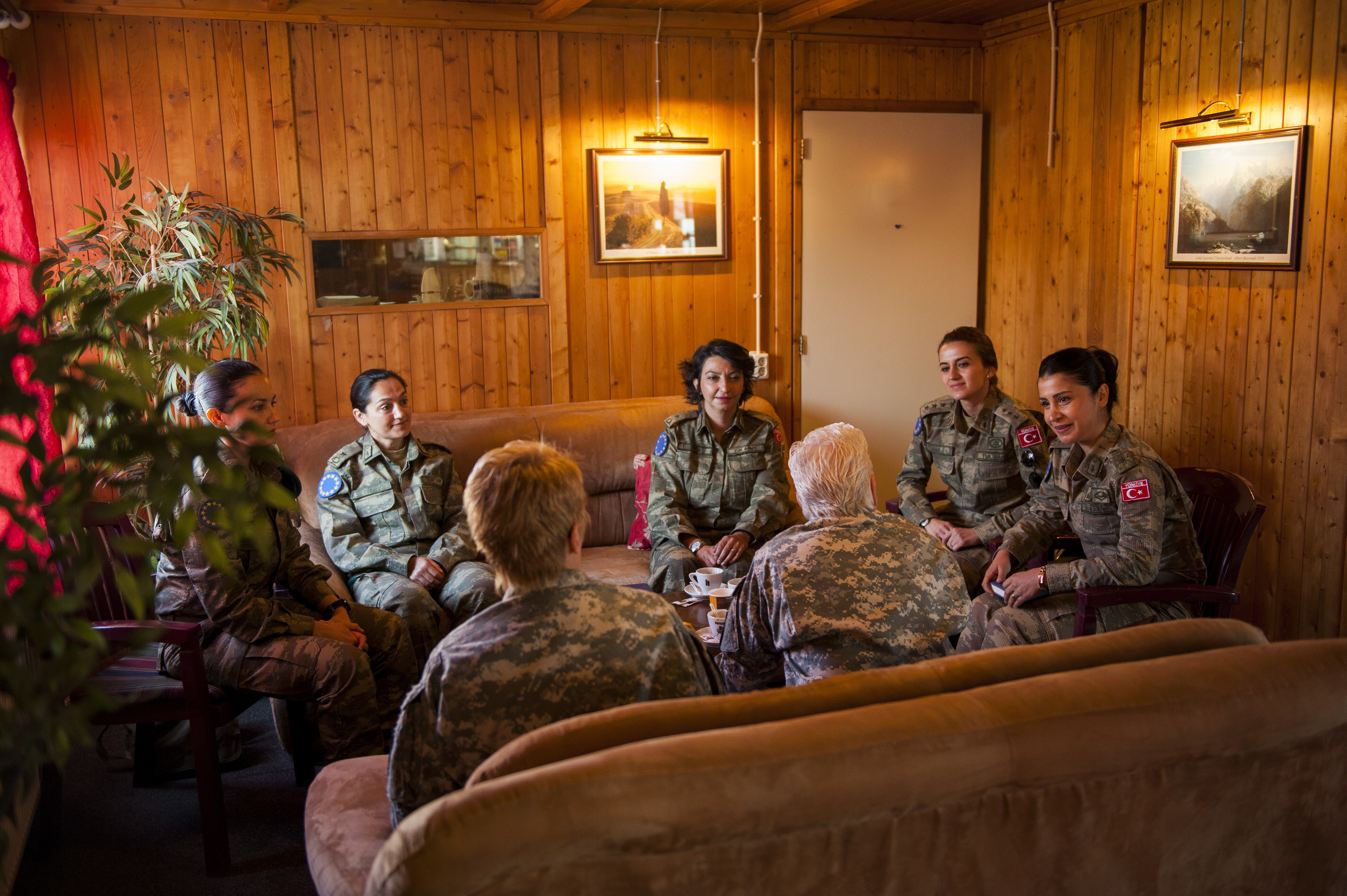
U.S. Army Brig. Gen. Giselle Wilz, NATO Headquarters Sarajevo commander, speaks with female officers of the Turkish Land Forces during a mentoring session at Camp Butmir, Bosnia and Herzegovina.

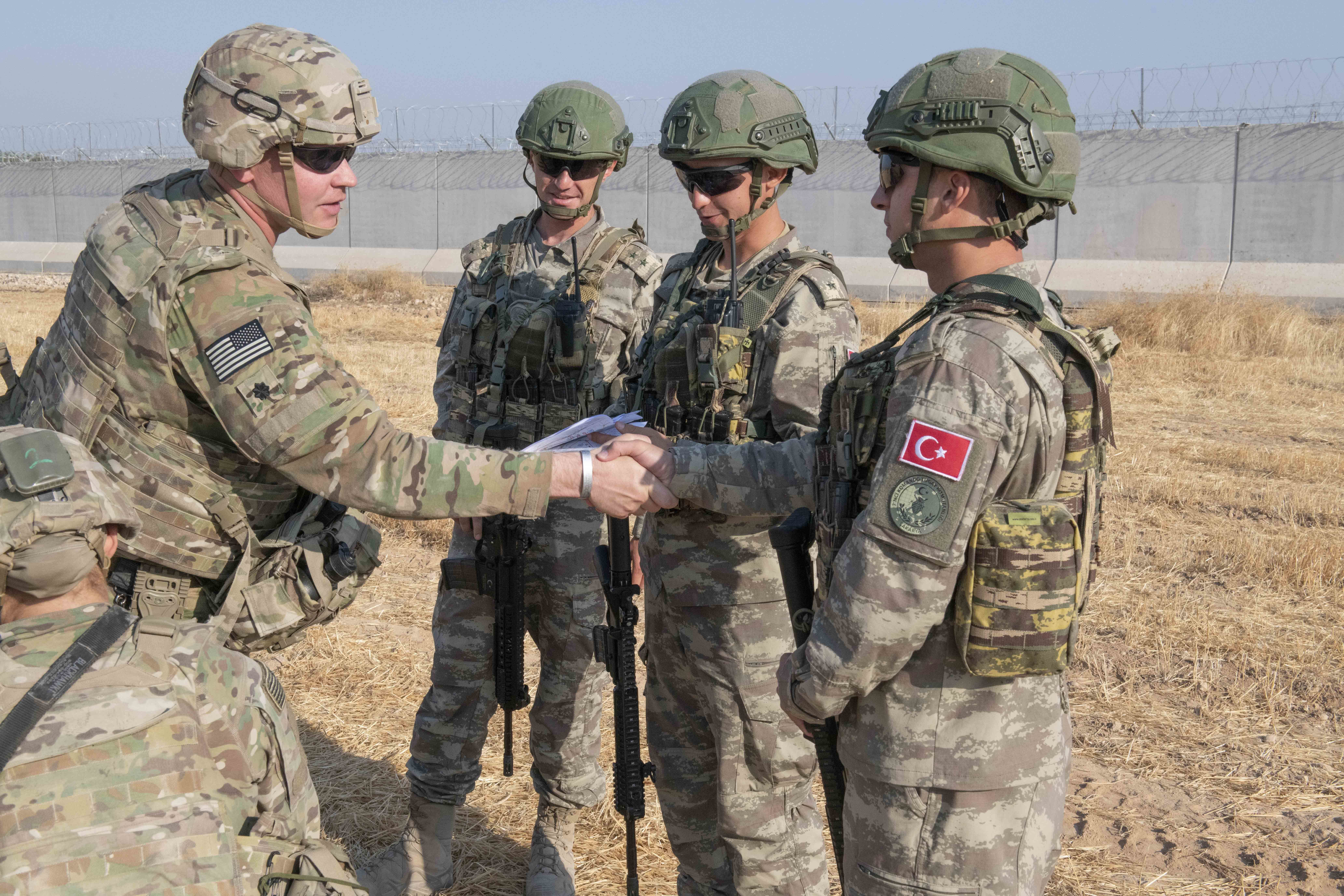
U.S. and TAF soldiers conduct the third ground combined joint patrol inside the security mechanism area in northeast Syria.

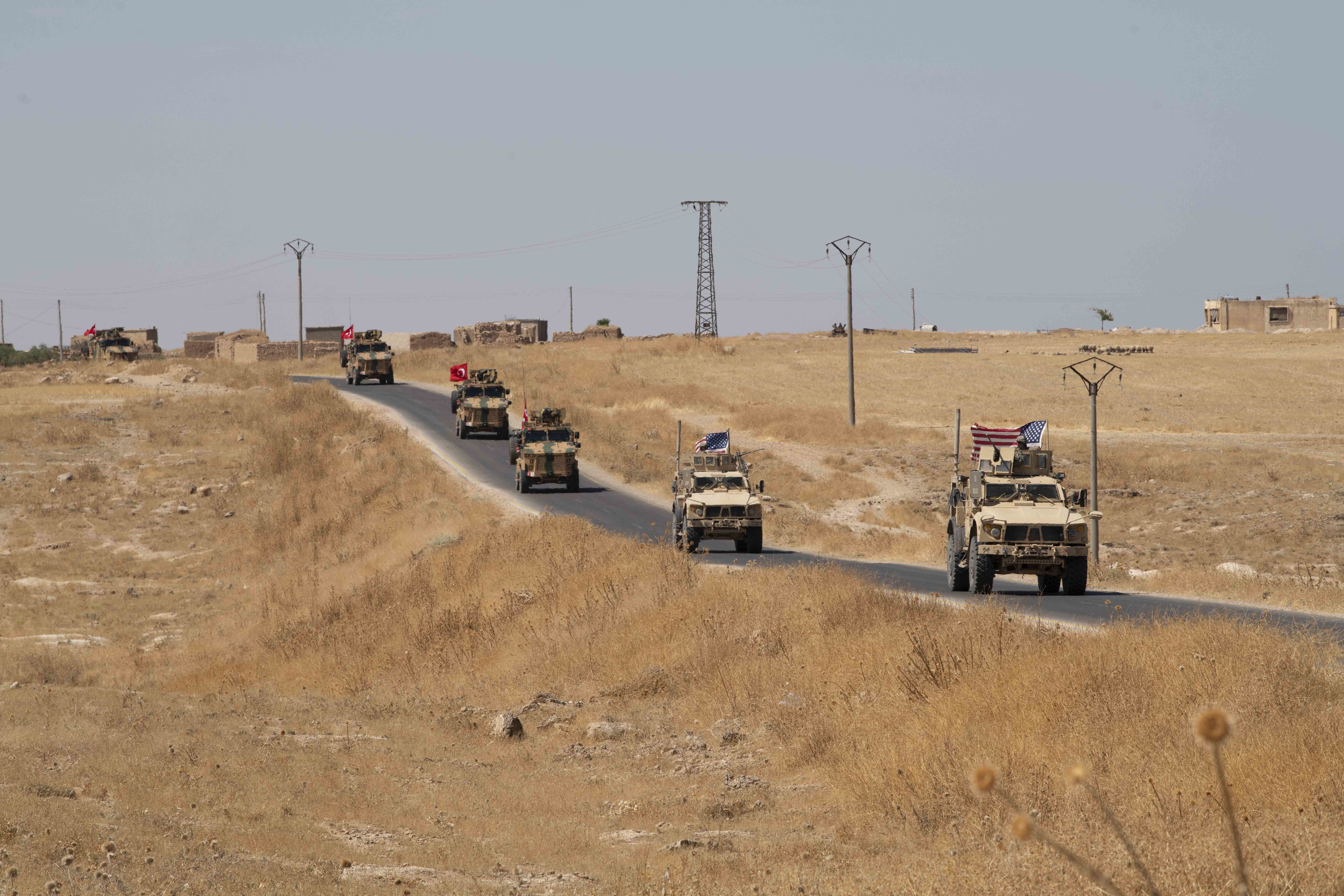
Turkish MRAP Kirpi (behind) and U.S. MRAP Oshkosh M-ATV (in front), Northern Syria

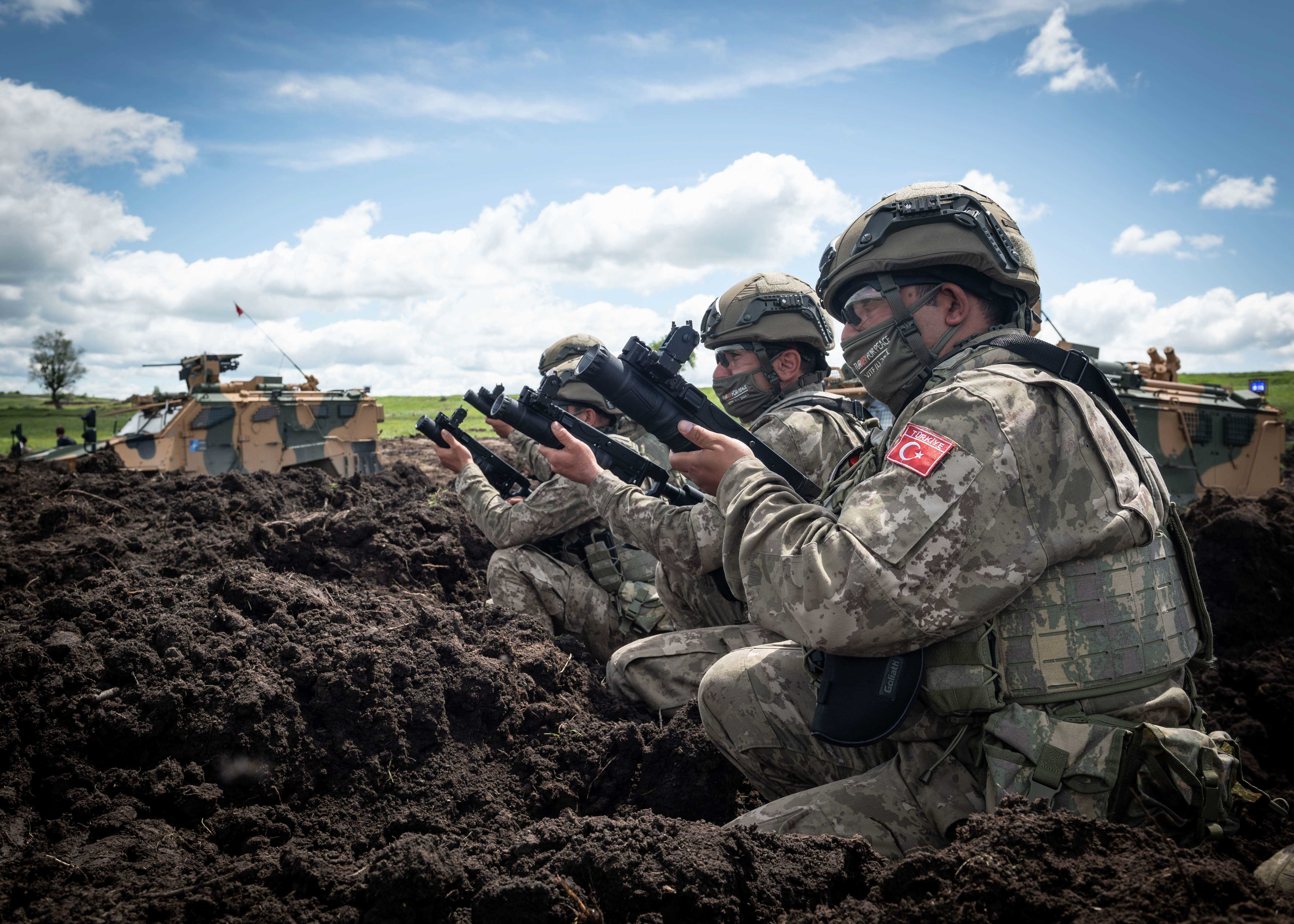
TAF soldiers in Romania

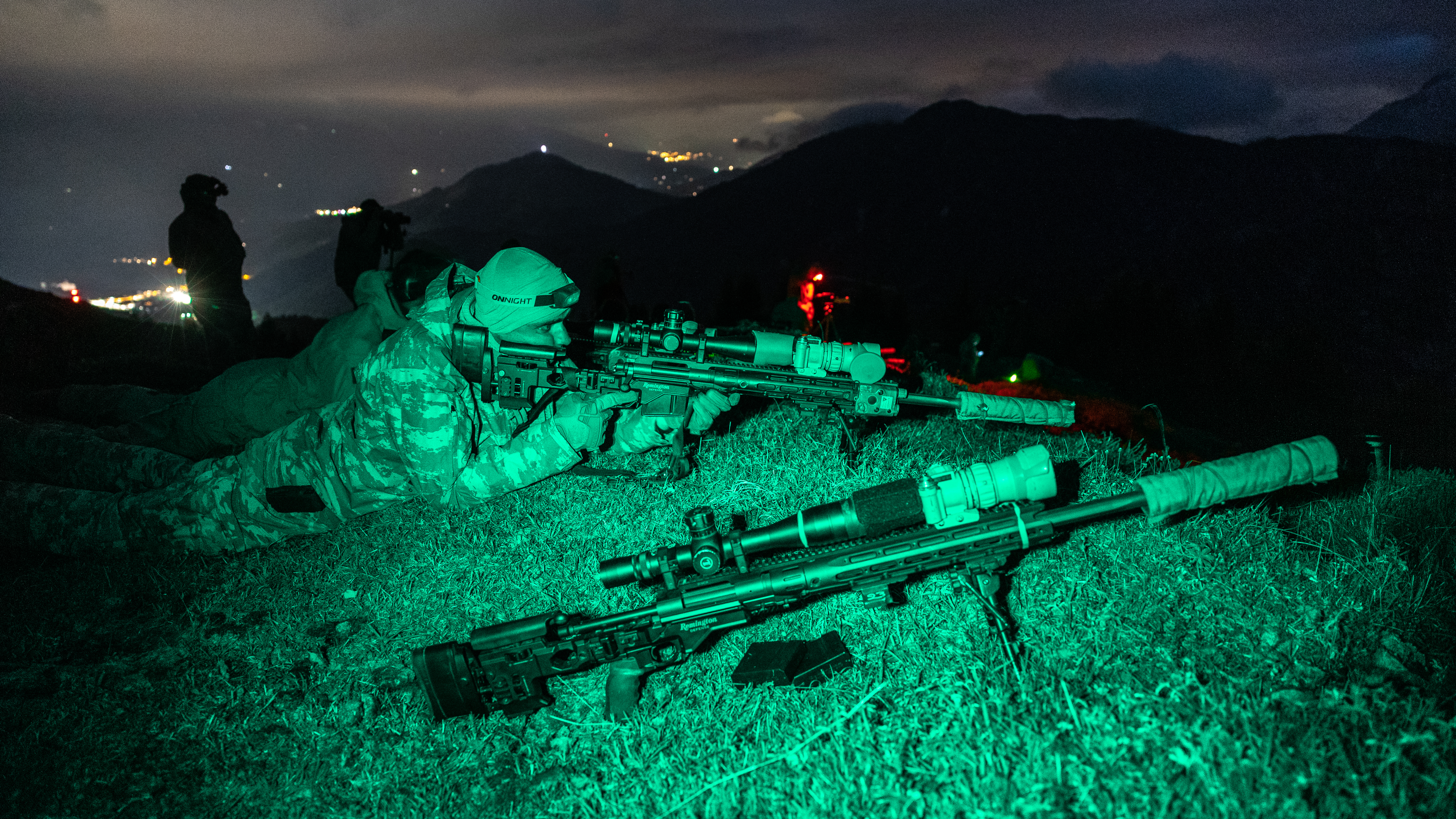
A TAF Special Forces Sniper engages long range targets at night with a Remington Mk 21 Precision Sniper Rifle at the International Specialty Training Center (ISTC) Alpine Sniper Course, in Hochfilzen training area, Austria.

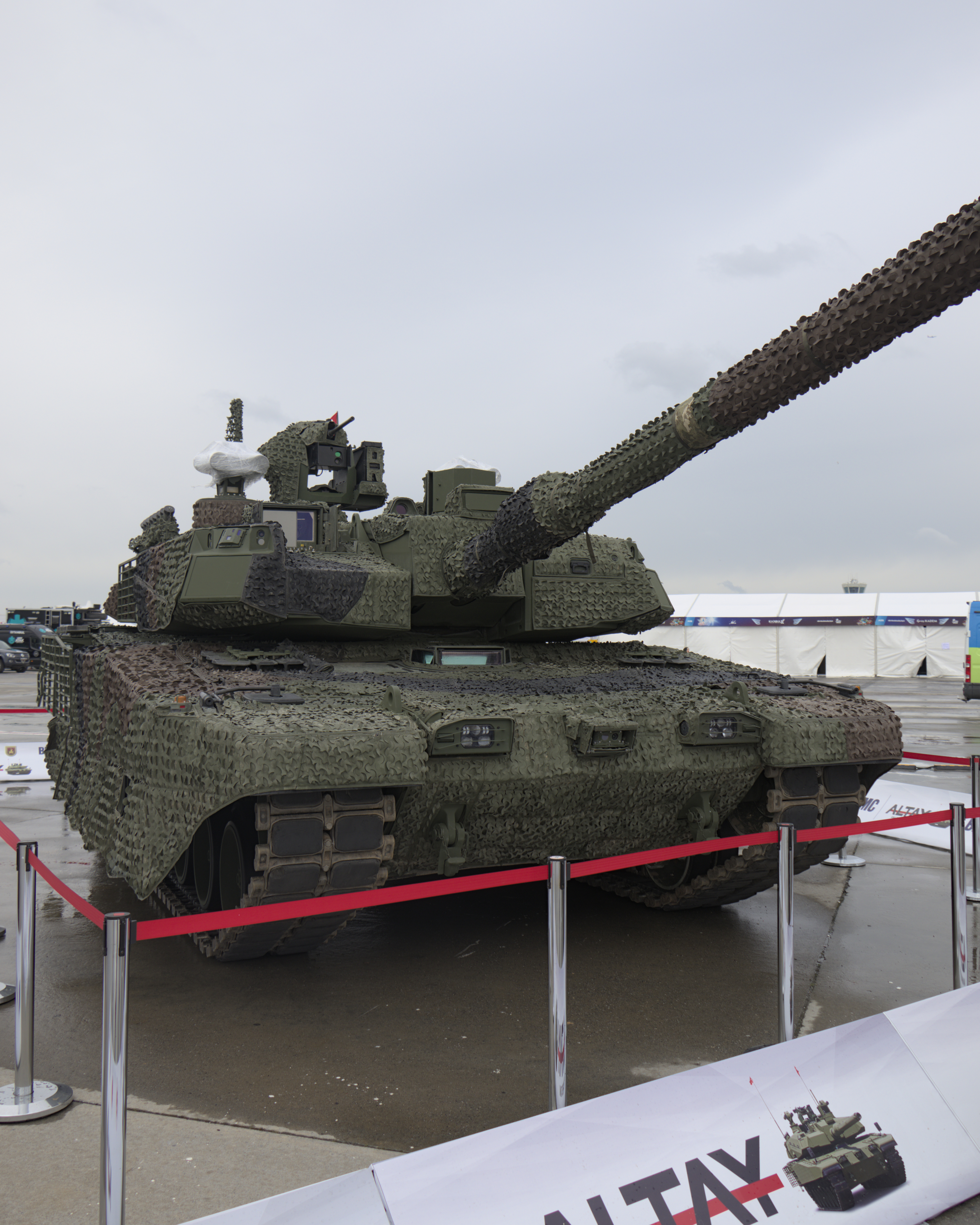
Turkish Altay main battle tank

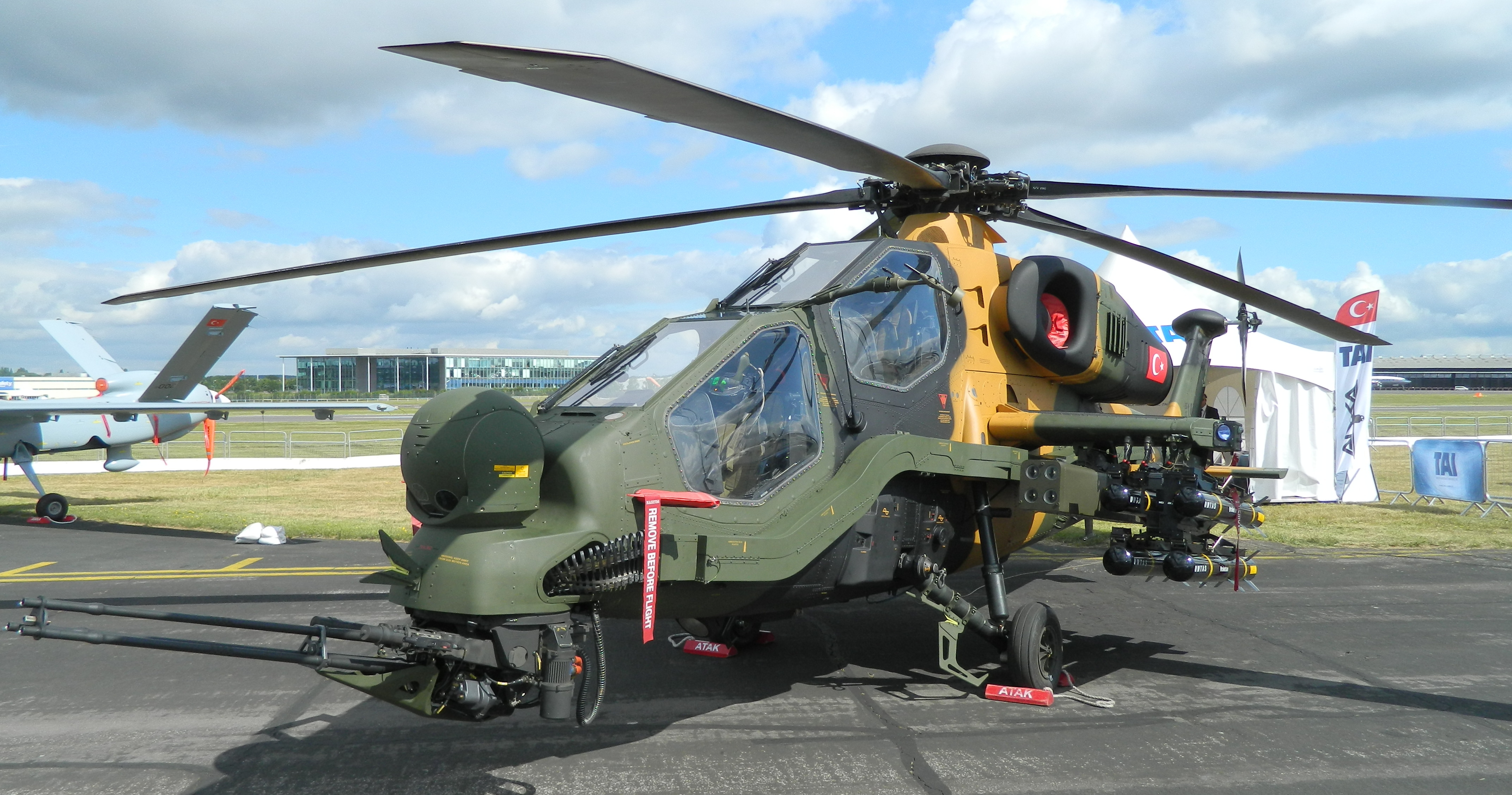
T-129

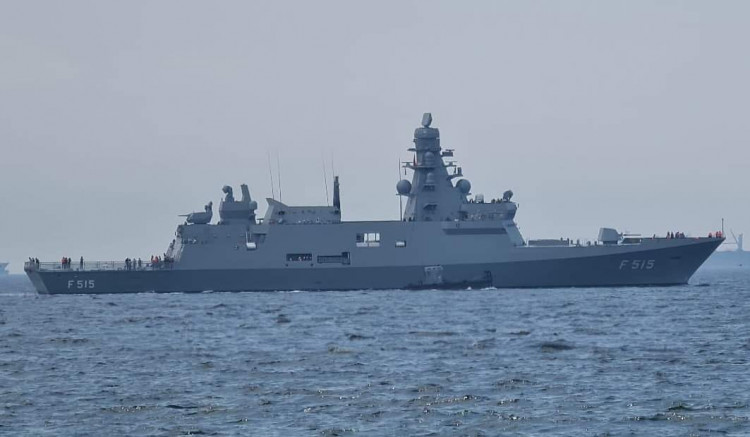
TCG Istanbul (İstif-class frigate)

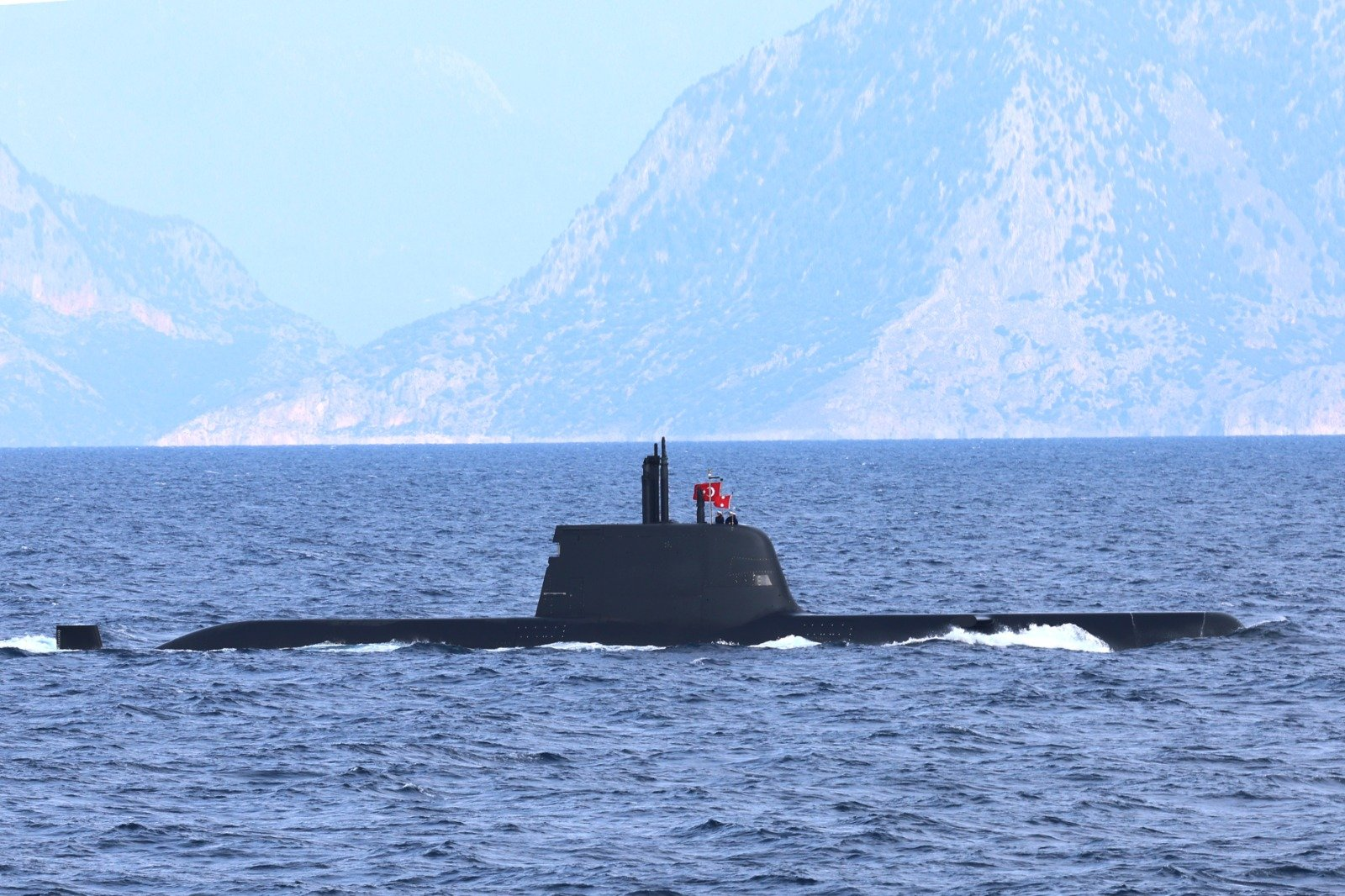
TCG Piri Reis (Reis class submarine)

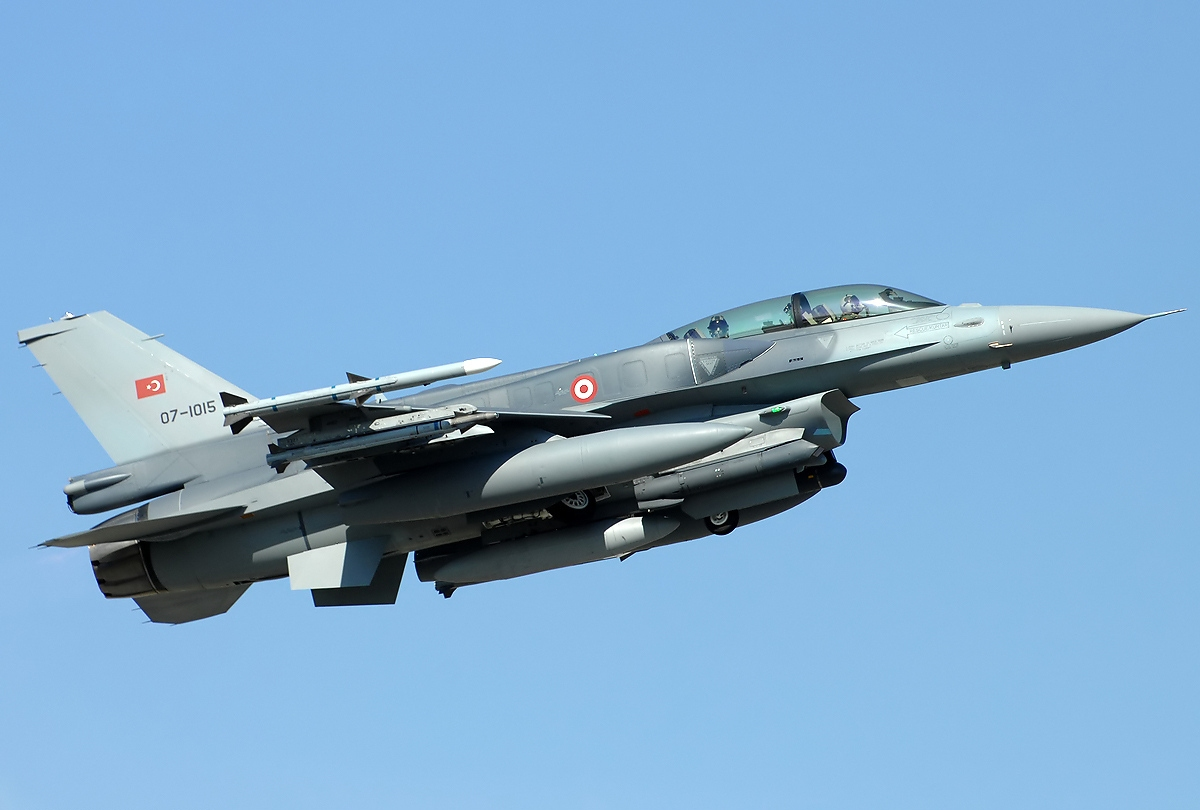
A Turkish F-16 taking off from İzmir Çiğli Air Base - LTBL, Turkey

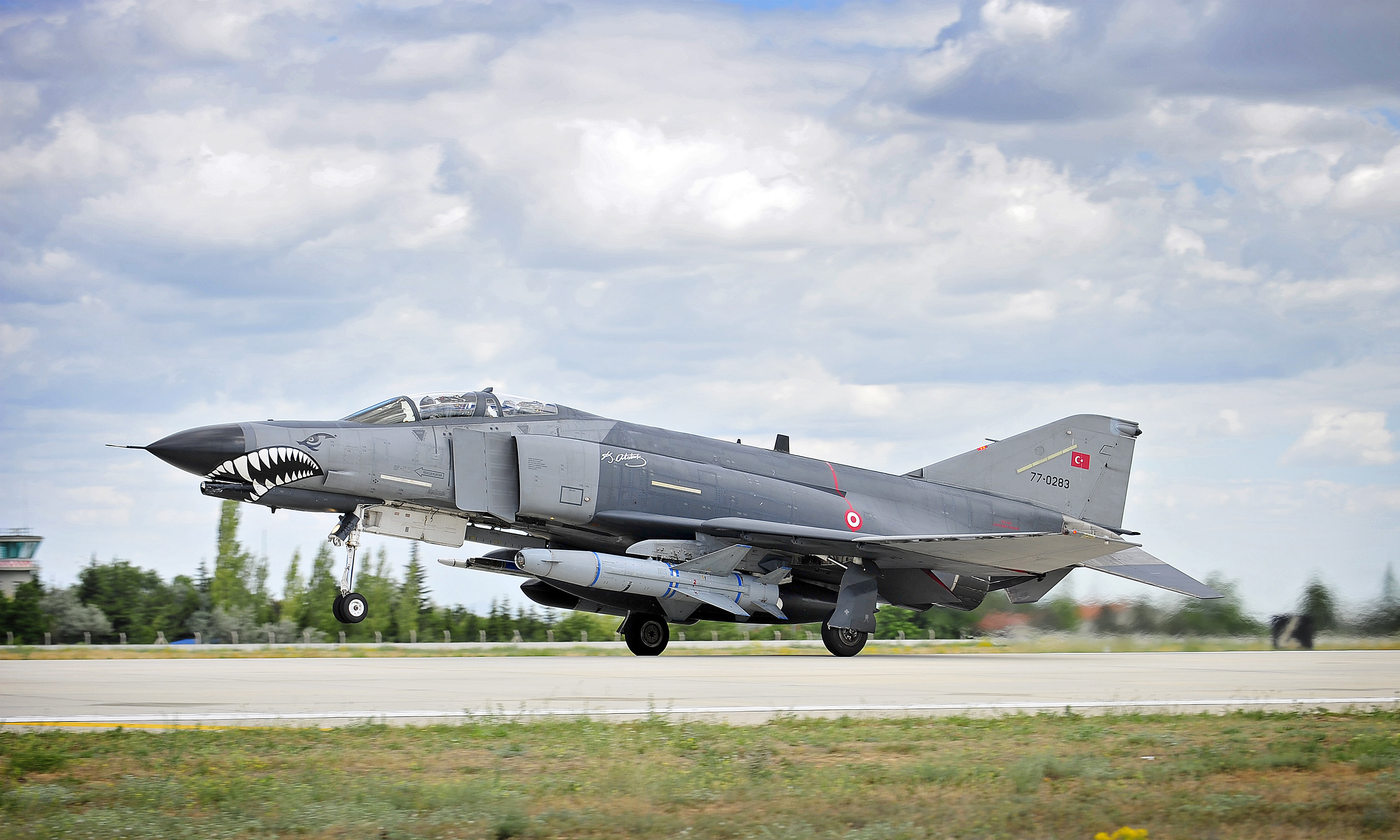
An F4E Phantom II aircraft with the Turkish Air Force (Türk Hava Kuvvetleri) takes off from Third Air Force Base Konya, Turkey, during Exercise Anatolian Eagle.

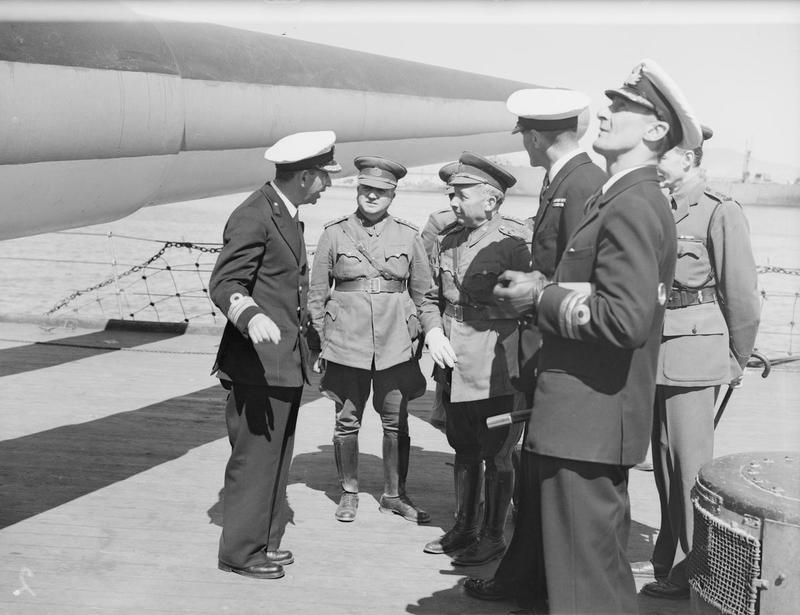
Turkish military mission with Western Mediterranean Fleet. 9 April 1943, on Board HMS Nelson.

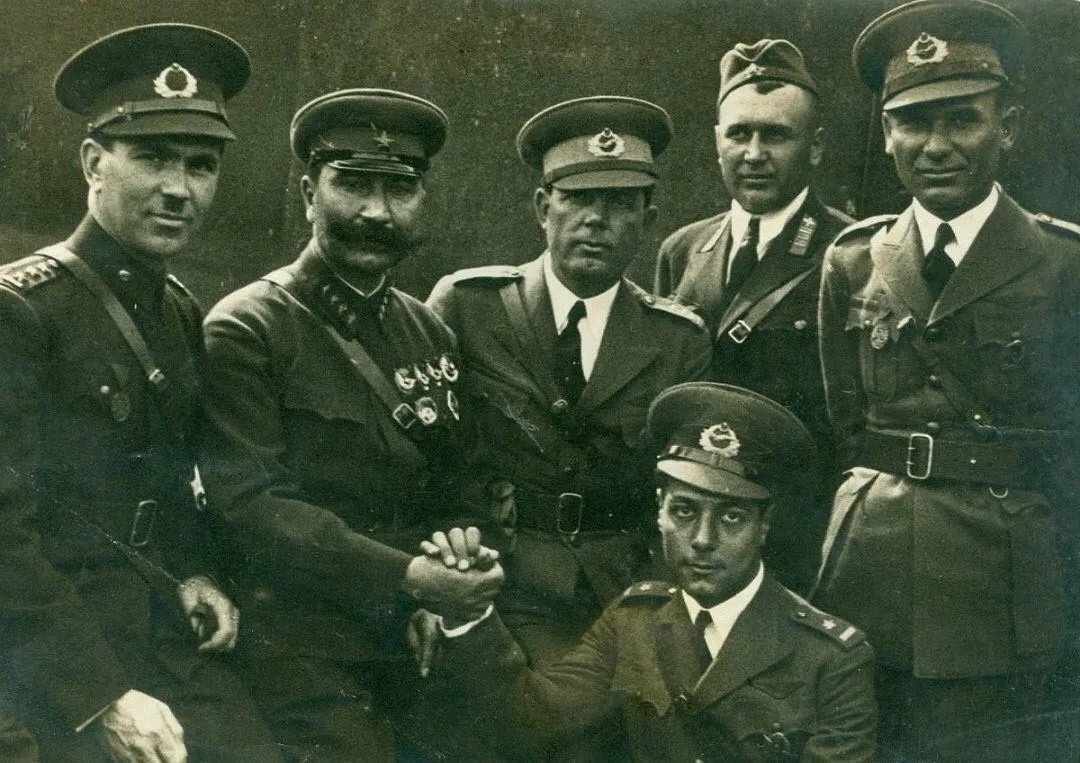
Turkish officers visiting Soviet Moscow, 1934 (Image shows Semyon Budyonny, a prominent Soviet army commander)

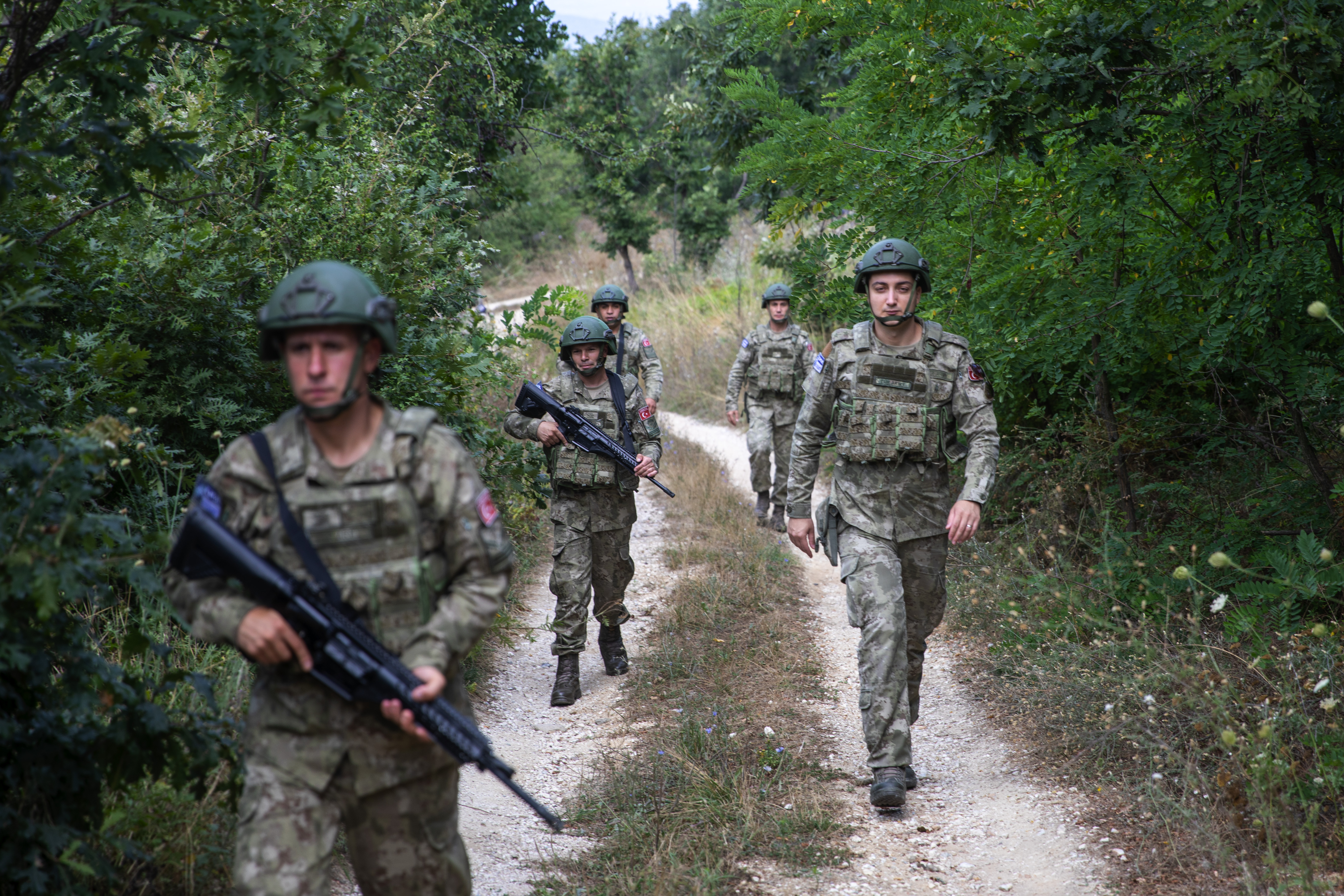
KFOR Patrol, Turkish soldiers in Kosovo

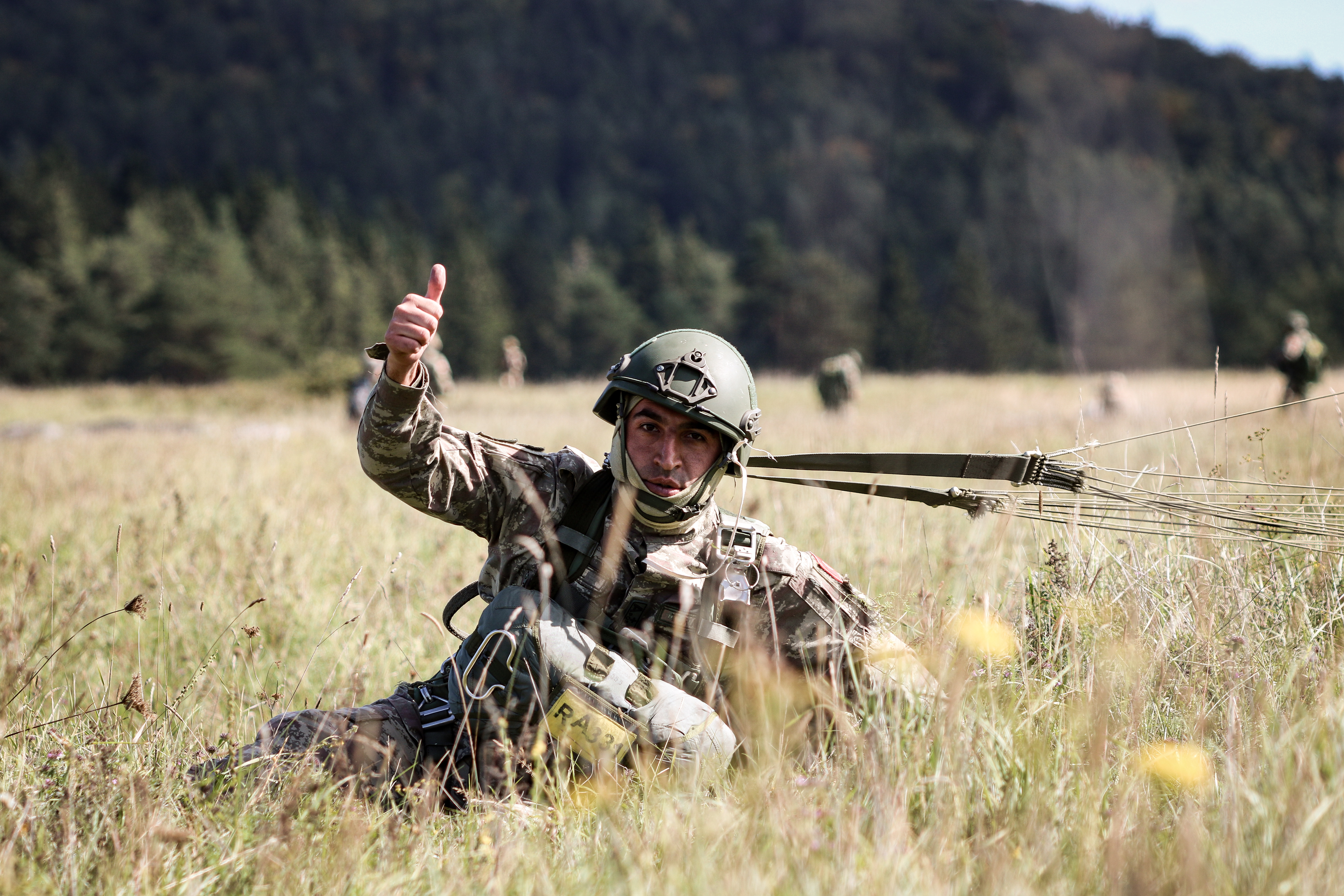
A paratrooper in Saber Junction 2019

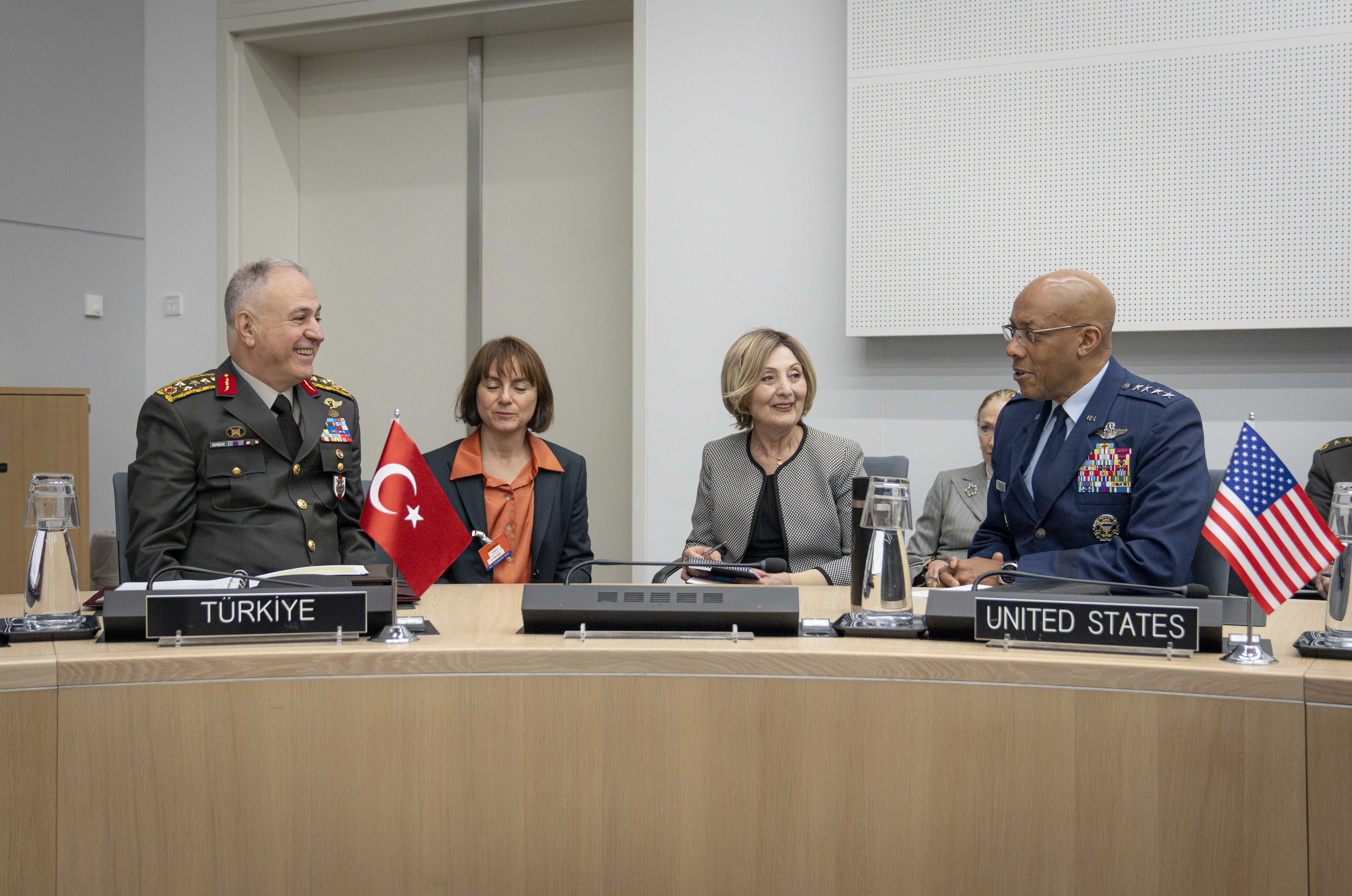
Gen. CQ Brown, Jr., Chairman of the Joint Chiefs of Staff, meets with Gen. Metin Gürak, Chief of the General Staff of the Turkish Armed Forces.

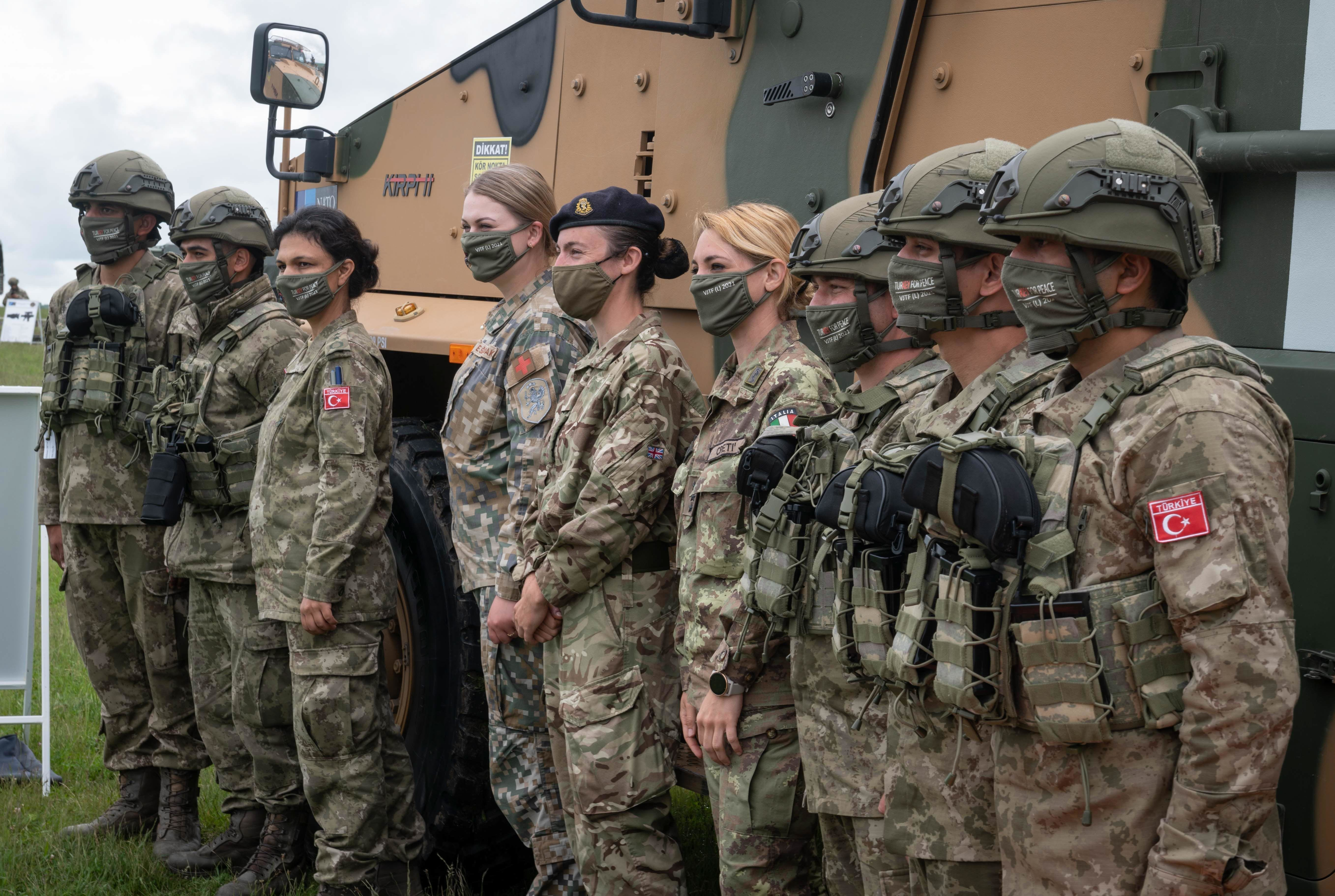
Turkish, Latvian, British and Italian medical personnel pose for a photo at a static display of equipment during NATO Exercise Steadfast Defender 2021.

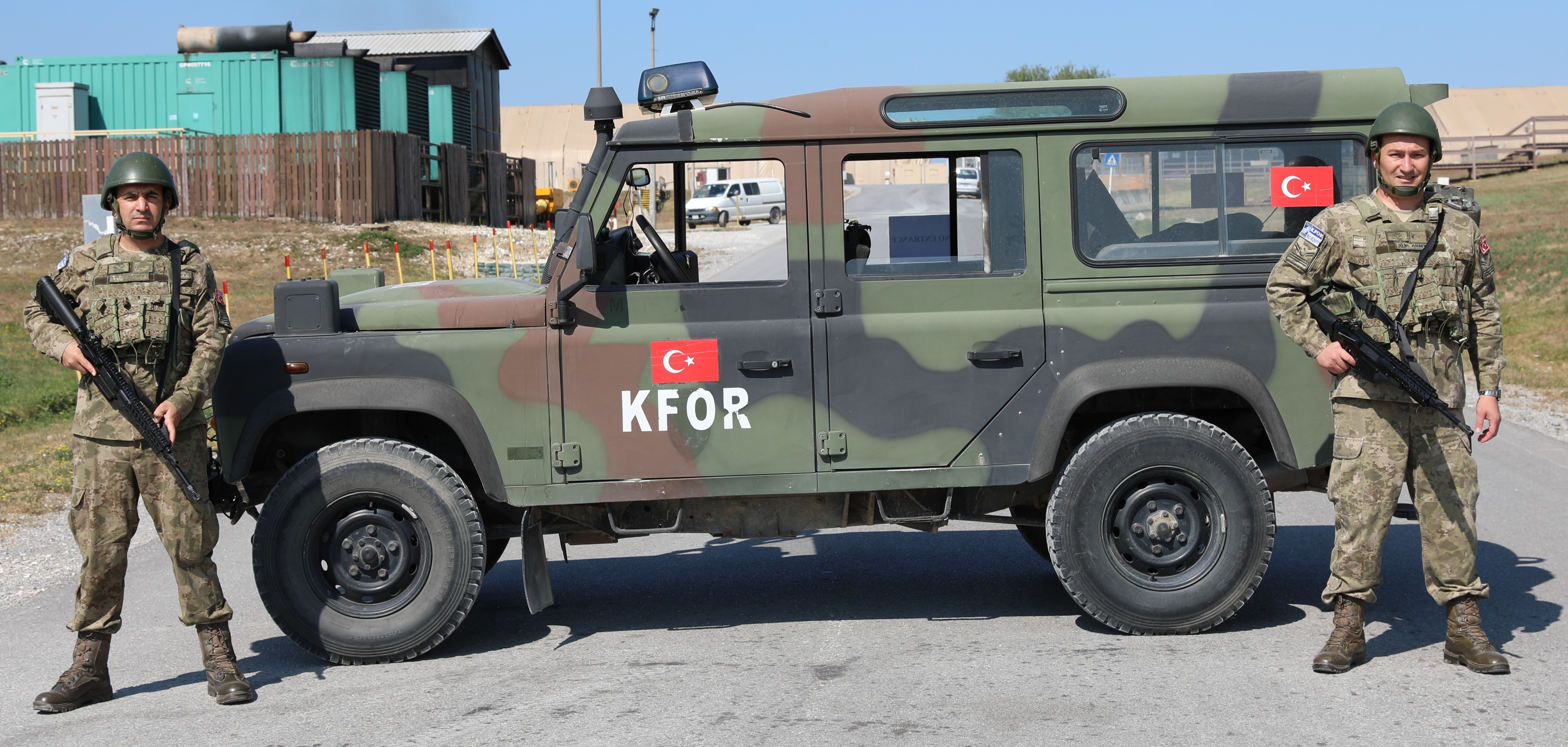
Turkish soldiers in Kosovo, KFOR

== See also ==
- Conscription in Turkey
- Efes exercise
- Military equipment of Turkey
- Gendarmerie General Command (Turkey)
- Coast Guard Command (Turkey)
- Village guard system
- Defense industry of Turkey
- National Defense University (Turkey)
- List of active Turkish Air Force aircraft

== Bibliography ==
- The Military Balance. London: Routledge. 2018. ISBN 978-1-85743-955-7.
- Hackett, James, ed. (2024) [2010]. The Military Balance. London: Routledge. ISBN 978-1-85743-557-3.
- Birler, Hayri (7 February 1997). "The Coup Primer". Turkish Daily News. Archived from the original on 13 August 2011.
- Gareth Jenkins, "Power and unaccountability in the Turkish security forces", Conflict, Security, and Development, Volume 1, Issue 1.
- Landis, Dan; Albert, Rosita, eds. (2012). Handbook of Ethnic Conflict: International Perspectives. Springer. p. 264. ISBN 978-1-4614-0447-7.
- Turkish General Staff, Cumhuriyet'in 70nci yıldönümünde Türk silâhlı kuvvetleri, 1923-1993, ["The Turkish Armed Forces on the 70th Anniversary of the Republic, 1923–1993."]
