= General Staff of the Turkish Armed Forces =

Highest staff organization in the Turkish Armed Forces

- Turkish: Türk Silahlı Kuvvetleri Genelkurmay Başkanlığı
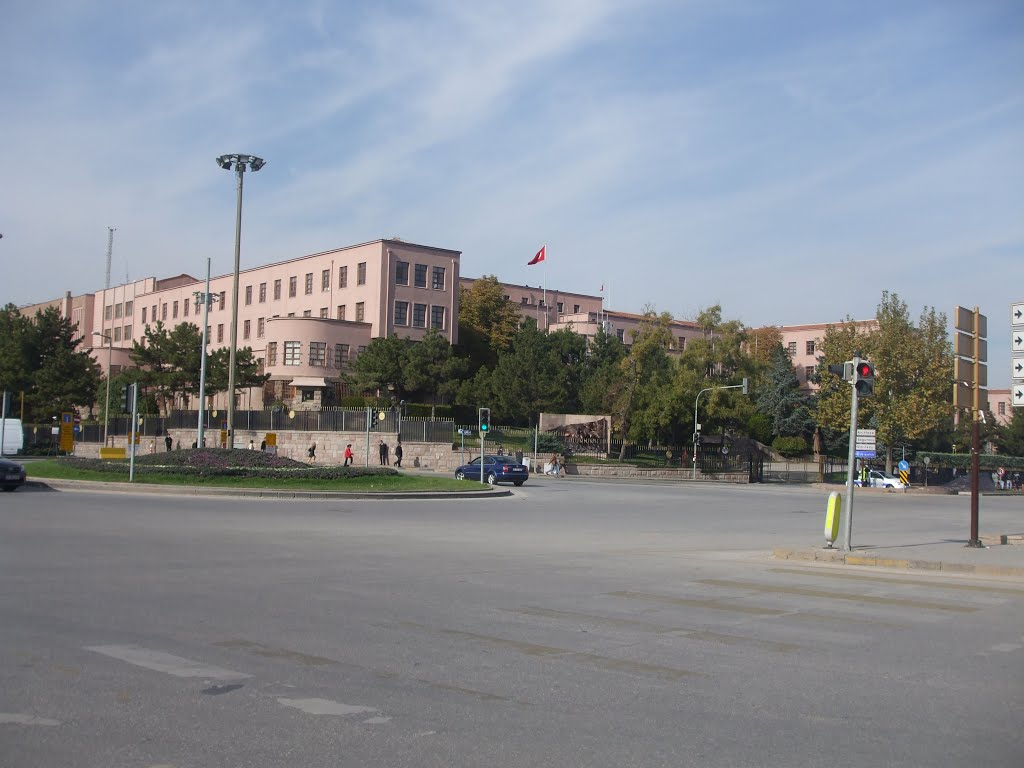
- The General Staff Building, Kızılay, Ankara
- Founded: 3 May 1920
- Country: Turkey
- Type: Staff
- Part of: Turkish Armed Forces
- Garrison/HQ: General Staff Building, Ankara

Commanders
- Chief: General Selçuk Bayraktaroğlu
- Second Chief: General İrfan Özsert

The General Staff of the Turkish Armed Forces (Turkish: Türk Silahlı Kuvvetleri Genelkurmay Başkanlığı, abbreviation: TSK Gnkur. Bşk.lığı) is the highest staff organization in the Turkish Armed Forces.

== Chief of the General Staff ==
General Staff Headquarters main building, Ankara (1929)

The Chief of the General Staff is the most senior ranked officer in the Turkish Armed Forces. The current Chief of the General Staff is Selçuk Bayraktaroğlu. His predecessor was Metin Gürak. According to the Constitution of Turkey, the Chief of the General Staff reports to the President and serves as commander of the Turkish Armed Forces.

In times of war, the Chief of the General Staff assumes the authority of commander-in-chief on behalf of the President, which represents the authority of commander-in-chief on behalf of the Grand National Assembly (Parliament). Commanding the Armed Forces and establishing the policies and programs related with the preparation of personnel for combat, intelligence, operations, organization, training and logistic services are the responsibilities of the General Staff. Furthermore, the General Staff coordinates the military relations of the Turkish Armed Forces with its counterparts in the member states of NATO and other friendly nations.

Rank insignia of the Chief of the General Staff

The Chief of the General Staff holds the fifth-highest rank in the state protocol list, behind the President of the Republic, the President of the Constitutional Court, the Speaker of the Grand National Assembly and the Vice President, on the protocol of the Republic of Turkey.

It is customary for the Chief of the General Staff to have held the post of Commander of the Turkish Land Forces prior to their appointment. Although it is not a legal requirement.

== Turkey's defence organisation ==
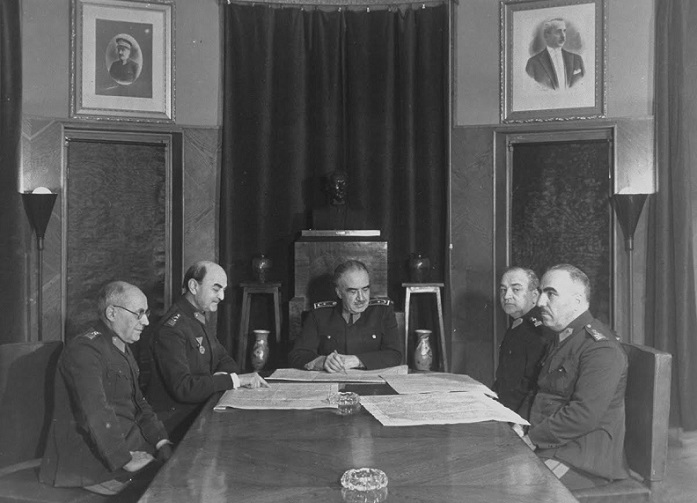
A meeting led by Field Marshal Fevzi Çakmak, Chief of the General Staff, in the 1940s

The hierarchy, representation and employment of the Turkish Armed Forces within the state organization is regulated by the constitution of Turkey.

The Turkish Armed Forces consists of General Staff of the Turkish Armed Forces, the Turkish Land Forces, the Turkish Naval Forces and the Turkish Air Forces.

According to the constitution, the 'Commander in Chief' is within the spiritual entity of the Grand National Assembly and represented by the President who is responsible to the Grand National Assembly for national security and the preparation of the Turkish Armed Forces to defend the country. However, the authority to declare a state of war and send the Turkish Armed Forces to foreign countries or allow foreign armed forces to be stationed in Turkey require a vote of approval from the Turkish Parliament. Although president can decide to use the Armed Forces for defence of the country if there is a sudden outside attack against the country.

Minister of National Defence is subordinate to the President and responsible for recruitment, procurement, production, logistics, medical care and other tasks in the preparation of Armed Forces and its personnel for military operations.

The Chief of the General Staff is subordinate to the Minister of National Defense and responsible for:

- Preparing the Armed Forces and its personnel for military operations
- Gathering military intelligence
- Organization and training of the Armed Forces
- Management of the logistic services

The Chief of the General Staff is also, Commander-in-Chief of the Armed Forces in the name of the President, in wartime.

The commanders of the three services (Army, Navy and Air Force) reports directly to the Minister of National Defense.

President (Commander-in-Chief)
Minister of National Defense
Chief of the General Staff	Commander of the Land Forces	Commander of the Naval Forces	Commander of the Air Forces

"Ministry of National Defence Organization Chart".

== Special Forces Command ==
Special Forces Command (Turkish: Özel Kuvvetler Komutanlığı), nicknamed Maroon Berets (Turkish: Bordo Bereliler) because of their distinctive service headgear, are the special operations unit of the Turkish Armed Forces. Special Forces Command is not aligned to any force command in TAF, getting orders directly from the General Staff.

== See also ==
- Ottoman General Staff
