= General Staff Building (Ankara) =

- Genelkurmay Karargahı; Büyük Erkân-ı Harbiye
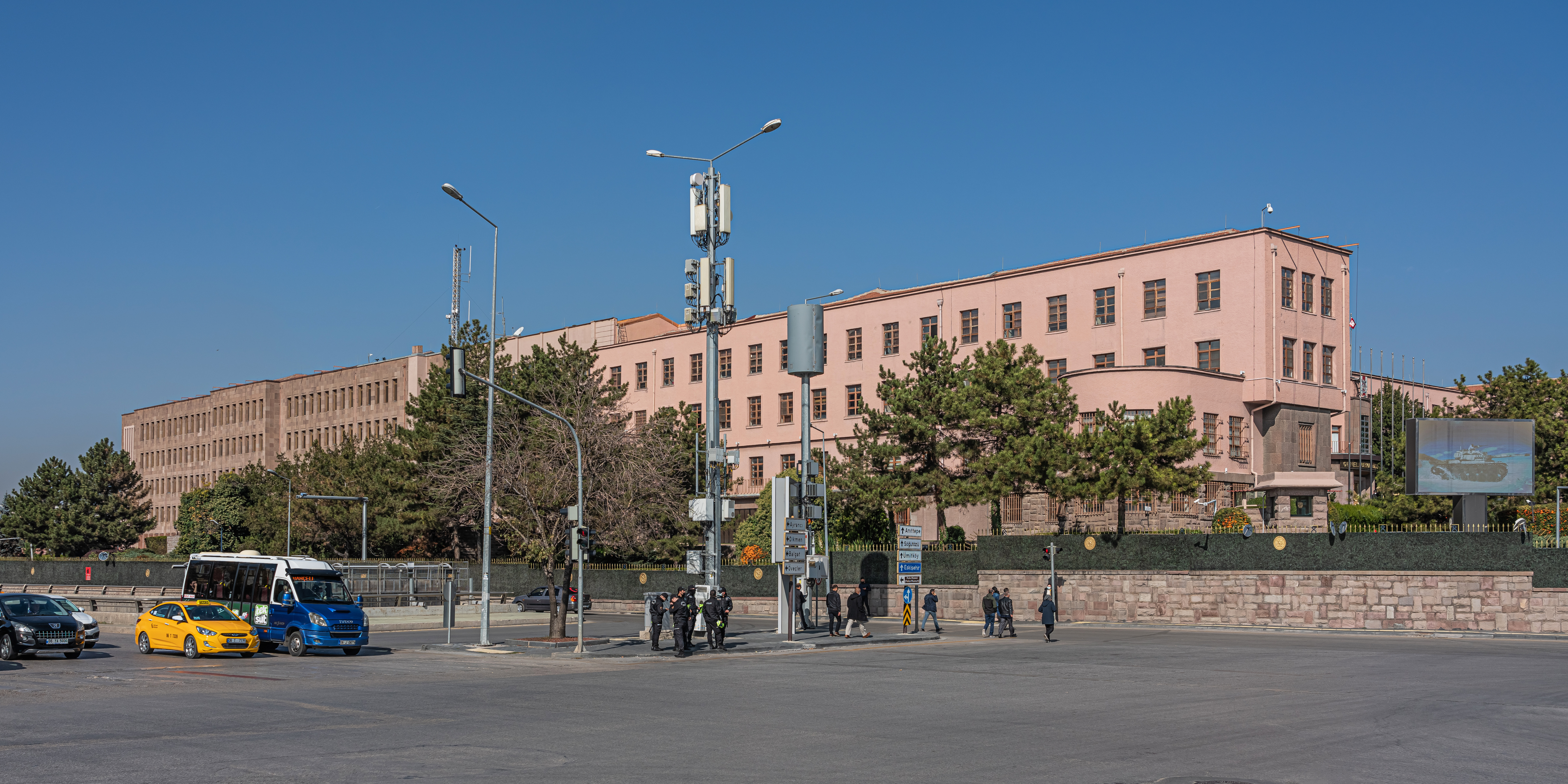
- General Staff of Turkey

- Location within Turkey

General information
- Architectural style: Eclectic, neoclassical
- Location: Ankara, Turkey, Turkey
- Coordinates: 39°55′28″N 32°53′08″E
- Current tenants: Turkey court
- Construction started: 1929
- Inaugurated: 1930
- Client: Turkish Army
- Owner: Turkish Armed Forces

Design and construction
- Architect: Clemens Holzmeister

Website
- www.tsk.tr

The General Staff Building (Turkish: Genelkurmay Başkanlığı Karargâh Binası), opened in 1929, the design is owned by Clemens Holzmeister, the administrative building of the Turkish Armed Forces in Çankaya, Ankara.

== History ==
General Staff Headquarters main building, Ankara (1929)

The Chief of Staff, operating in Ankara Ziraat Mektebi, sought to donate one Turkish farmer's field upon the search for a new headquarters building. However, with the order of the Chief of General Staff Marshal Fevzi Çakmak, the field was purchased at a rate of 5 kuruşs per square meter.

== Architecture ==
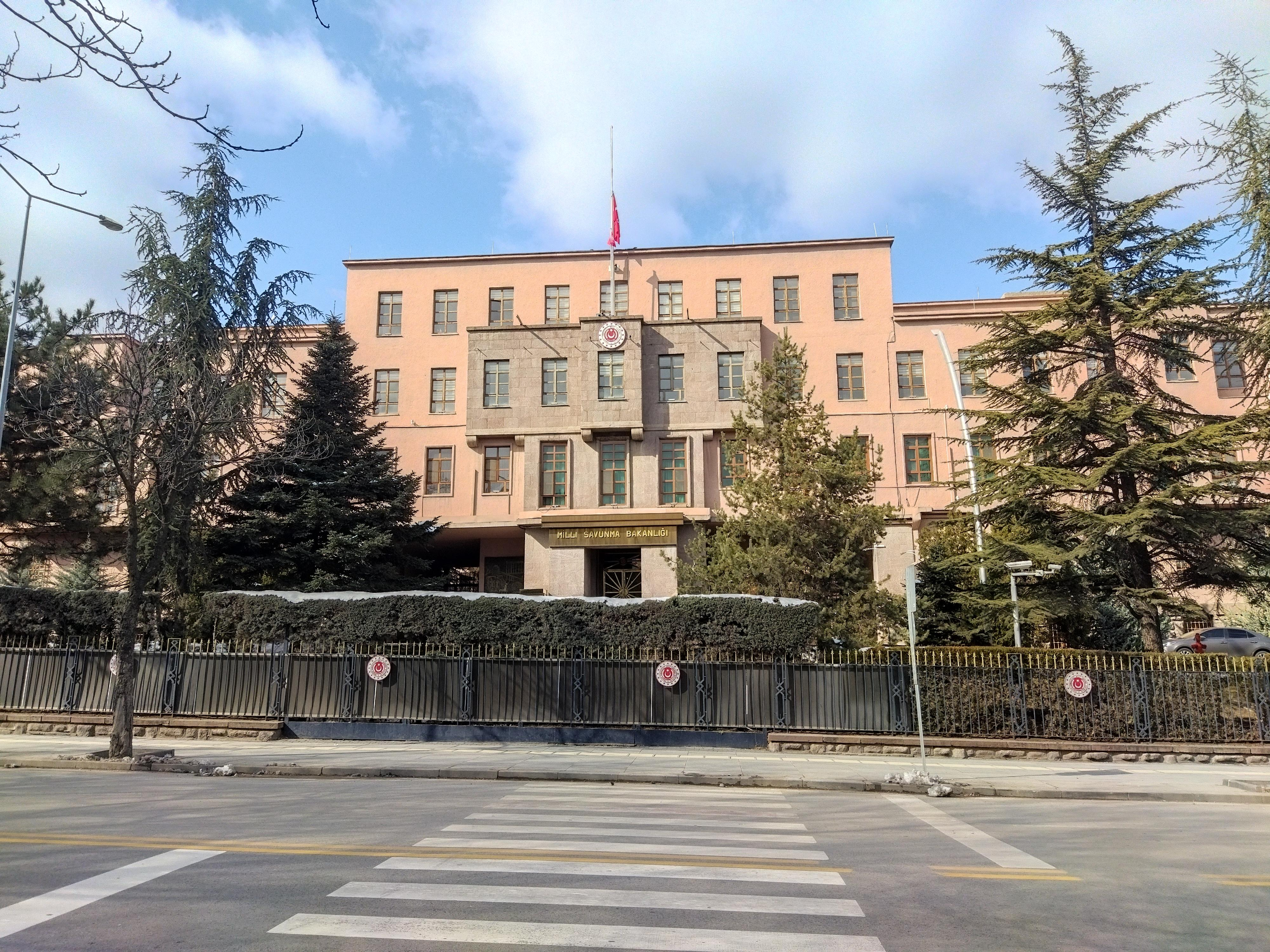
A view of the General Staff Headquarters' main building from the front

One of the first state constructions in the State District, the pavilions of the building offer a massive and plain appearance with square windows equally spaced on all surfaces. The "H" -shaped building has softened the sharp, right-angled image of the building's section in the form of a half-cylinder in front of the part of the entrance that emerges with high stairs. Half-cylinder spaces that are not present at the ends of the wings extending forward on both sides of the entrance and forming the arms of the "H" are included in the design for the same purpose. The flat cover conceals the sloping cover behind the impressive facades.

The General Staff Headquarters and National Defense Headquarters serving in separate buildings were connected to each other in 1959. An additional building was built in 1970 when the existing building could not meet the needs.
