= List of commanders of the Second Army of Turkey =

This list includes commanders of the Second Army of Turkey, who were, in their time of service, nominal heads of the Second Army (Turkish: Ikinci Ordu), one of the four field armies of the Turkish Land Forces.

The current Commander of the Second Army is General Levent Ergün, since 28 August 2024.

No.	Commander	Picture	Took office	Left office
1	General Yakup Şevki Subaşı		1 November 1921	21 October 1923
2	General Ali Fuat Cebesoy		21 October 1923	1 November 1924
3	General Fahrettin Altay		1 November 1924	22 November 1933
4	General İzzettin Çalışlar		22 November 1933	20 December 1939
5	General Abdurrahman Nafiz Gürman		20 December 1939	19 December 1943
6	General İshak Avni Akdağ		19 December 1943	6 August 1945
7	General Nuri Yamut		6 August 1945	9 August 1946
8	General Hakkı Akoğuz		9 August 1946	24 August 1949
9	General Muzaffer Tuğsavul		24 August 1949	6 July 1950
10	General Şahap Gürler		6 July 1950	25 July 1952
11	General Abdülkadir Seven		25 July 1952	25 April 1955
12	Lieutenant general Necati Tacan		25 April 1955	14 June 1956
13	General Rüştü Erdelhun		14 June 1956	1 Ağustos 1958
14	General Muhittin Önür		1 August 1958	28 June 1960
15	General Mehmet Ali Keskiner		28 June 1960	23 February 1962
16	General Refik Tulga		26 February 1962	29 August 1963
17	General Cemal Tural		25 September 1963	28 August 1964
18	General Kemalettin Gökakın		28 August 1964	28 August 1967
19	General Nazmi Karakoç		28 August 1967	28 August 1969
20	General Faruk Gürler		29 August 1969	28 August 1970
21	General Semih Sancar		29 August 1970	28 August 1972
22	General Nihat Tulunay		28 August 1972	29 August 1973
23	General Suat Aktulga		29 August 1973	28 August 1975
24	General Şükrü Olcay		28 August 1975	30 August 1977
25	General Vecihi Akın		30 August 1977	30 August 1978
26	General İbrahim Şenocak		30 August 1978	30 August 1980
27	General Bedrettin Demirel		30 August 1980	30 August 1981
28	General İsmail Hakkı Akansel		30 August 1981	30 August 1984
28	General Adnan Doğu		30 August 1984	30 August 1985
30	General Mehmet Önder		30 August 1985	14 August 1986
31	General Burhanettin Bigalı		14 August 1986	30 August 1988
32	General İbrahim Türkgenci		30 August 1988	28 August 1990
33	General Kemal Yavuz		28 August 1990	28 August 1992
34	General Necati İkizoğlu		28 August 1992	28 August 1994
35	General Fikret Özden Boztepe		28 August 1994	28 August 1996
36	General Rasim Betir		28 August 1996	28 August 1998
37	General Aytaç Yalman		28 August 1998	24 August 2000
38	General Halit Edip Başer		24 August 2000	28 August 2002
39	General Fevzi Türkeri		28 August 2002	26 August 2004
40	General Şükrü Sarıışık		26 August 2004	30 August 2006
41	General Hasan Iğsız		30 August 2006	30 August 2008
42	General Necdet Özel		30 August 2008	24 August 2010
43	General Servet Yörük		24 August 2010	30 August 2012
44	General Galip Mendi		30 August 2012	30 August 2014
45	General Adem Huduti		30 August 2014	18 July 2016
46	General İsmail Metin Temel		18 July 2016	31 December 2018
47	Lieutenant general Sinan Yayla		31 December 2018	30 August 2020
48	General Metin Gürak		30 August 2020	16 August 2023
49	Lieutenant general Metin Tokel		16 August 2023	28 August 2024
50	General Levent Ergün		28 August 2024	Incumbent

== See also ==
- Chief of the Turkish General Staff
- List of commanders of the Turkish Land Forces
