= List of commanders of the Special Forces of the Turkish Armed Forces =

This list covers the commanders of the various special forces of the Turkish Armed Forces; namely, the Tactical Mobilisation Group (Turkish: Seferberlik Tetkik Kurulu), 1952–65; the Special Warfare Department (Turkish: Özel Harp Dairesi), 1965–1994; and the Special Forces Command (Turkish: Özel Kuvvetler Komutanlığı

No.	Commander	Took office	Left office
1	Daniş Karabelen	1952	1960
2	Faruk Ateşdağlı	1960	1961
3	Şaban Başsoy	1961	1963
4	Sezai Okan	1963	1965
5	Recai Engin	1965	1966
6	Cihat Akyol	1966	1971
7	Kemal Yamak	1971	1974
8	Sabri Yirmibeşoğlu	1974	1976
9	Atilla Erdoğan	1976	1980
10	Aydın İlter	1980	1983
11	Cumhur Evcil	1983	1986
12	Hasan Kundakçı	1986	1988
13	Fevzi Türkeri	1988	1989
14	Atilla Kurtaran	1989	1990
15	Kemal Yılmaz	1990	1994
16	Fevzi Türkeri	1994	1996
17	Engin Alan	1996	2000
18	Nevzat Bekaroğlu	2000	2002
19	Sadık Ercan	2002	2003
20	Servet Yörük	2003	2005
21	Abdullah Barutçu	2005	2009
22	Halil Soysal	20 August 2009	4 August 2013
23	Zekai Aksakallı	4 August 2013	20 August 2017
24	Ahmet Ercan Çorbacı	20 August 2017	30 August 2019
25	Ömer Ertuğrul Erbakan	30 August 2019	Incumbent

== See also ==
- Chief of the Turkish General Staff
- List of commanders of the Turkish Land Forces
