= Istanbul pogrom =

1955 state-sanctioned violence against minorities in Turkey

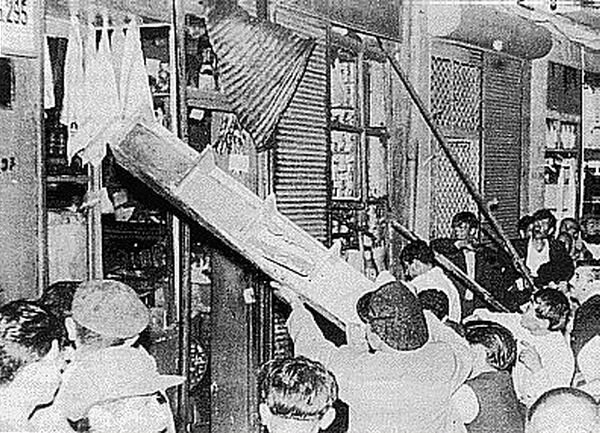
- Turkish mob attacking Greek property
- Location: Istanbul, Turkey
- Date: 6–7 September 1955
- Target: Private property, Orthodox churches and Christian cemeteries of the Greek population of the city
- Attack type: Pogrom/Mob violence
- Deaths: Exact number is unknown, estimates vary from 13 to 37 or more
- Injuries: More than 1,000 injured, approximately 200–400 Greek women and boys raped
- Perpetrators: Tactical Mobilisation Group (special forces), Democrat Party, National Security Service, Turkish Cyprus Association

The Istanbul pogrom, also known as the Istanbul riots, were a series of state-sponsored anti-Greek mob attacks directed primarily at Istanbul's Greek minority on 6–7 September 1955. The pogrom was orchestrated by the governing Democrat Party in Turkey with the cooperation of various security organizations (Tactical Mobilisation Group, Counter-Guerrilla and National Security Service). The events were triggered by the bombing of the Turkish consulate in Thessaloniki, Greece, the house where Mustafa Kemal Atatürk was born in 1881. The bomb was actually planted by a Turkish usher at the consulate, who was later arrested and confessed. The Turkish press was silent about the arrest, and instead, it insinuated that Greeks had set off the bomb.

A Turkish mob, most of whose members were trucked into the city in advance, assaulted Istanbul's Greek community for nine hours. Although the mob did not explicitly call for the killing of Greeks, over a dozen people died during or after the attacks as a result of beatings and arson. Armenians and Jews were also harmed. The police were mostly ineffective, and the violence continued until the government declared martial law in Istanbul, called in the army and ordered it to put down the riots. The material damage was estimated at US$500 million (equivalent to $6 billion in 2025), including the burning of churches and the devastation of shops and private homes.

After the military coup of 1960, Prime Minister Adnan Menderes and Foreign Minister Fatin Rüştü Zorlu were convicted of inciting the pogrom in the Yassıada trials. Being found guilty in other cases, they were sentenced to death by hanging.

The pogrom, together with the 1964–1965 expulsion of Istanbul Greeks, initiated under İsmet İnönü’s CHP-led government, greatly accelerated the emigration of ethnic Greeks from Turkey. The Greek population of Turkey declined from 119,822 in 1927, to about 7,000 in 1978. In Istanbul alone, the Greek-speaking population decreased from 65,108 to 49,081 between 1955 and 1960. The 2008 figures released by the Turkish Foreign Ministry placed the number of Turkish citizens of Greek descent at 3,000–4,000; while according to the Human Rights Watch (2006) their number was estimated to be 2,500. The attacks have been described as a continuation of a process of Turkification that started with the decline of the Ottoman Empire, as roughly 40% of the properties attacked belonged to other minorities. The pogrom has been compared in some media to the Kristallnacht, the 1938 pogrom against Jews throughout Nazi Germany.

== Background ==
=== Greeks of Istanbul ===
Constantinople (modern Istanbul) was the capital of the Byzantine Empire until 1453, when the city was conquered by Ottoman forces. A large indigenous Greek community continued to live in the multi-ethnic Ottoman capital city and enjoyed a relatively protected status under the Ottoman Millet system. The city's Greek population, particularly the Phanariotes, came to play a significant role in the social and economic life of the city and in the political and diplomatic life of the Islamic but multi-ethnic, multi-religious Ottoman Empire in general. This continued even after rebellions against Ottoman rule in Greece and the establishment of an independent Greek state in 1829, although during the Greek War of Independence massacres against local Greek communities occurred. A number of ethnic Armenians and Greeks, who served in the Ottoman Imperial diplomatic service and were even leading politicians in the 19th and early 20th century, were targeted.

Into the 19th century, the Christians of Istanbul tended to be either Greek Orthodox, members of the Armenian Apostolic Church or Catholic Levantines. Greeks and Armenians form the largest Christian population in the city. Following the collapse of the Ottoman Empire, the Greco-Turkish War (1919–1922), and the establishment of the Republic of Turkey, the population exchange agreement signed between Greece and Turkey resulted in the uprooting of all Greeks in modern Turkey (and Muslims in Greece) from where many of them had lived for centuries. But due to the Greeks' strong emotional attachment to their first capital as well as the importance of the Ecumenical Patriarchate for Greek and worldwide Orthodoxy, the Greek population of Istanbul was specifically exempted and allowed to stay in place. Nevertheless, this population began to decline, as evinced by demographic statistics.

Punitive Turkish nationalist exclusivist measures, such as a 1932 parliamentary law, barred Greek citizens living in Turkey from a series of 30 trades and professions from tailoring and carpentry to medicine, law and real estate. The Varlık Vergisi tax imposed in 1942 also served to reduce the economic potential of Christian and Jewish businesspeople in Turkey.

=== Context ===
In the early 1950s, Turkey had close relations with Greece. In 1952, Paul of Greece became the first Greek Monarch to visit a Turkish head of state, which was soon followed by Turkish president Celâl Bayar's visit to Greece. However, the relations soured starting in 1953, when the armed struggle of the Greek Cypriots, the majority of the island's population, aiming for political union of Cyprus with Greece, started. Soon after, Georgios Grivas formed the armed organization EOKA. This turn of events was politically exploited in Turkey by the Turkish nationalists of Kıbrıs Türktür Cemiyeti (Cyprus is Turkish) organization

The Greek government had appealed in 1954 to the United Nations to demand self-determination for Cyprus. Britain had a ruling mandate over the mostly ethnic Greek island, and wanted the Cyprus dispute to be resolved without being taken to the United Nations Security Council, due to fears of how the Greek and Greek Cypriot parties would portray the conflict. To this end, the British government resolved to temper Greek demands by encouraging the Turkish government to publicly express their support for Turkish-Cypriot cause, which they estimated would ensure the issue would not reach the UN Security Council. British reports from the period made disparate assessments on the state of Greco-Turkish relations; one by the British Embassy in August 1954 stated that the relationship was of a superficial nature and that a minor source of tension, such as a hypothetical Greek destruction of Atatürk's house in Thessaloniki, would cause permanent damage; while an official of the Foreign Office said that a stern stance towards Greece would be to Turkey's benefit. MP John Strachey warned that Turkey had a large ethnic Greek minority in Istanbul as a card to play against Greece if it considered annexing an independent Cyprus against the wishes of Turkish-Cypriots.

The concerns about the events in Cyprus led to the formation of a number of nationalist student and irredentist organizations in Istanbul, such as the National Federation of Turkish Students (Turkish: Türkiye Milli Talebe Federasyonu), the National Union of Turkish Students, and Hikmet Bil's (editor of the major newspaper Hürriyet) "Cyprus is Turkish" Association (Turkish: Kıbrıs Türktür Cemiyeti), who had protested against the Greek minority and the Ecumenical Patriarchate.

In 1955, a propaganda campaign involving the Turkish press galvanized public opinion against the Greek minority, targeting Athenogoras, the Ecumenical Patriarch of Constantinople, in particular, accusing him of collecting donations for Enosis. Leading the pack was Hürriyet, which wrote on 28 August 1955: "If the Greeks dare touch our brethren, then there are plenty of Greeks in Istanbul to retaliate upon." Ömer Sami Coşar from Cumhuriyet wrote on 30 August:

Neither the Patriarchate nor the Rûm [i.e. Greek] minority ever openly supported Turkish national interests when Turkey and Athens clashed over certain issues. In return, the great Turkish nation never raised its voice about this. But do the Phanar Patriarchate and our Rûm citizens in Istanbul have special missions assigned by Greece in its plans to annex Cyprus? While Greece was crushing Turks in Western Thrace and was appropriating their properties by force, our Rûm Turkish citizens lived as free as we do, sometimes even more comfortably. We think that these Rûms, who choose to remain silent in our struggle with Greece, are clever enough not to fall into the trap of four or five provocateurs.

Tercüman, Yeni Sabah, and Gece Postası followed suit. The "Cyprus is Turkish" Association (CTA) stepped up activities in the weeks leading up to the riots, increasing the number of branches from three in August to ten by the time the attacks took place. On September 4, Hikmet Bil ordered students at Taksim Square, the heart of the city, to burn Greek newspapers. The same day, Kamil Önal of the CTA – and the National Security Service – handed out to students twenty thousands banners emblazoned "Cyprus is Turkish".

The intercommunal violence in Cyprus prompted Turkey to transmit a diplomatic note to the British government, which invited the Turkish and Greek governments to a conference in London, which started on August 26. The day before the Tripartite London Conference (29 August–7 September 1955) began, Prime Minister Menderes claimed that Greek Cypriots were planning a massacre of Turkish Cypriots. Sensing an opportunity to temper Greek demands, Prime Minister Harold Macmillan advised the Turkish delegates that they should be stern. Turkish Foreign Minister Fatin Rüştü Zorlu launched a harsh opening salvo, stating that Turkey would reconsider its commitment to the Treaty of Lausanne unless Greece reconsidered its position on Cyprus. The Greek delegates, surprised by harshness of the speech, backed down during the negotiations, although they did not abandon the idea of enosis with Cyprus.

Deflecting domestic attention to Cyprus was politically convenient for the Menderes government, which was suffering from an ailing economy. Although a minority, the Greek population played a prominent role in the city's business life, making it a convenient scapegoat during the economic crisis in the mid-50s which saw Turkey's economy contract (with an 11% GDP/capita decrease in 1954). The DP responded first with inflationary policies, then when that failed, with authoritarianism and populism. DP's policies also introduced rural-urban mobility, which exposed some of the rural population to the lifestyles of the urban minorities. The three chief destinations were the largest three cities: Istanbul, Ankara, and İzmir. Between 1945 and 1955, the population of Istanbul increased from 1 million to about 1.6 million. Many of these new residents found themselves in shantytowns (Turkish: gecekondus), and constituted a prime target for populist policies.

Finally, the conference fell apart on 6 September, the first day the subject of Cyprus would be broached at the conference, when news broke of the bombing of the Turkish consulate (and birthplace of Atatürk) in Greece's second-largest city, Thessaloniki.

== Pogrom events ==
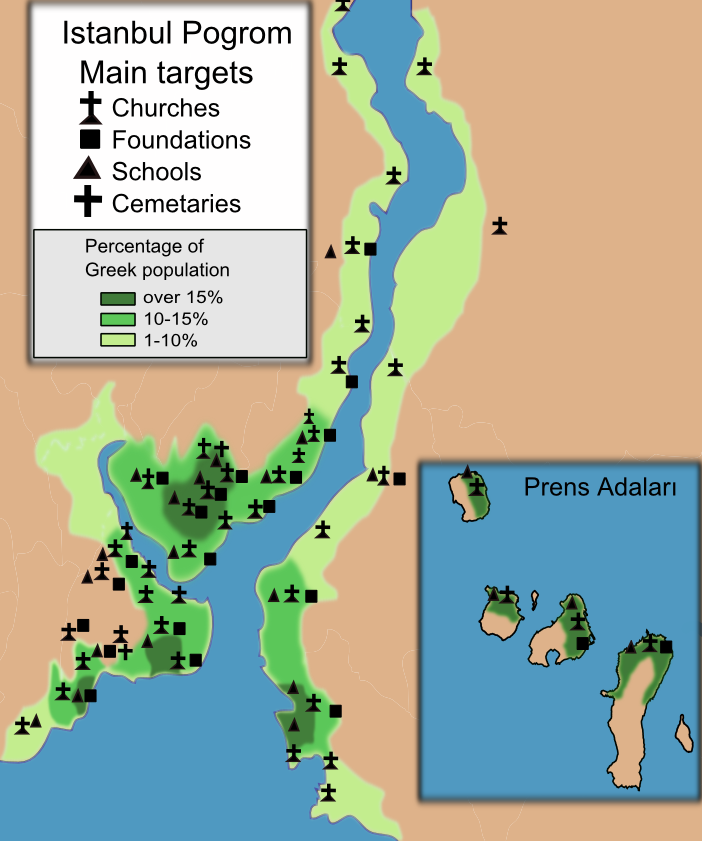
Main targets of the Istanbul riots.

Map of the Istanbul Metropolis

=== Planning ===
The 1961 Yassıada Trial after 1960 coup d'état accused Menderes and Foreign Minister Fatin Rüştü Zorlu of planning the riots. Though both of them rejected the claims, it is believed by scholars that Menderes assented to the organization of protests in Istanbul against the Greeks, but the extent of knowledge of Zorlu, who had been in London for the conference, is unclear. Interior Minister Namık Gedik was also accused of involvement, though he was not tried as he committed suicide before the trials started. According to Zorlu's lawyer at the Yassiada trial, a mob of 300,000 was marshaled in a radius of 40 miles (60 km) around the city for the attacks. The role of the National Security Service was not clarified at the trials, since the sole aim of the junta was to sentence the DP government.

The trial revealed that the fuse for the consulate bomb was sent from Turkey to Thessaloniki on 3 September. During the Yassıada Trial it was claimed that a twenty-year-old university student named Oktay Engin was given the mission of installing the explosives, two sticks of gelignite, in the consulate's garden. The consul M. Ali Balin allegedly first pressured consulate employee Hasan Uçar, but Engin was brought in when Uçar resisted. Both of them were arrested in Greece after the attack.

Engin was born in the Greek town of Komotini (Turkish: Gümülcine) to Faik Engin, a well-known parliamentarian in the late '40s and one of the three ethnic Turkish members of the Greek parliament between 1946 and 1950. Oktay Engin became one of the few ethnic Turkish students to graduate from Greek gymnasiums in those years. Turkish officials encouraged him to study law, offering him a scholarship, so that he could promote the interests of Turkish citizens in Greece. He thus entered Aristotle University of Thessaloniki in 1953. When he was in his second year, he was accused of incitement in the bombing incident. Engin said that he had been followed by Greek intelligence agents so closely from the start of his university education, that he could name one ("Triondafilos").

In his 2005 book, Speros Vryonis documents the direct role of the Demokrat Parti organization and government-controlled trade unions in amassing the rioters that swept Istanbul. Ten of Istanbul's 18 branches of the "Cyprus is Turkish" Association were run by DP officials. This organization played a crucial role in inciting anti-Greek activities. Most of the rioters came from western Asia Minor. His case study of Eskişehir shows how the party there recruited 400 to 500 workers from local factories, who were carted by train with third class-tickets to Istanbul. These recruits were promised the equivalent of US$6, which was never paid. They were accompanied by Eskişehir police, who were charged with coordinating the destruction and looting once the contingent was broken up into groups of 20–30 men, and the leaders of the party branches.

While the DP took the blame for the events, it was revealed in 2005 that the riots were also a product of the Turkey's Tactical Mobilization Group; a clandestine special forces unit. Four star general Sabri Yirmibeşoğlu, the right-hand man of General Kemal Yamak who led the Turkish outpost of Operation Gladio under the Tactical Mobilization Group (Turkish: Seferberlik Taktik Kurulu), proudly reminisced about his involvement in the riots, calling them "a magnificent organization".

Before the events in September 6, some buildings owned by Greeks and other non-Muslim minorities were marked with cross signs in order to make the arson easier.

=== Execution ===
Municipal and government trucks were placed in strategic points all around the city to distribute the tools of destruction (shovels, pickaxes, crowbars, ramrods and petrol), while 4,000 taxis were requisitioned from the Drivers Association and Motor Vehicle Workers' Trade Union (Turkish: Şoförler Cemiyeti ve Motorlu Taşıt İşçileri Sendikası) to transport the perpetrators. In addition, flags had been prepared by the Textile Workers' Union (Turkish: Tekstil İşçileri Sendikası).

A protest rally on the night of 6 September, organised by the authorities in Istanbul, on the Cyprus issue and the bombing of Atatürk's home was the cover for amassing the rioters. At 13:00, news reports of the bombing were announced by radio. However, most people at the time did not have radios, so they had to wait until 16:30, when the daily İstanbul Ekspres, which was associated with the DP and the National Security Service (NSS), repeated the news in print.

According to a September 2005 episode of the weekly show Files on the Greek Mega Channel, the accompanying photographs were seen by Salonican photographer Yannis Kyriakidis on September 4 (two days before the actual bombing). The consul's wife had brought the film to the photo studio that belonged to Kyriakidis' father to be printed. The photographs were then photomontaged, according to the program.

On the day of the event, the editor, Gökşin Sipahioğlu, called the owner, Mithat Perin, asking for permission for a second run. The weather was bad, so Perin declined thinking the prints would not get sold. The newspaper's main dealer, Fuat Büke, soon called and offered to pay for the run in advance. By the time Perin went to inspect the Tan Press, 180,000 copies had already been printed. Sensing something fishy, Perin tore up the paper and stopped the run. The prototype was still intact however, and the workers secretly resumed printing after Perin left. They had eventually printed 300,000 copies (on paper stocked in advance), of which 296,000 were sold. This was far above the newspaper's average circulation of 30,000–40,000 (by comparison, the best-selling Hürriyet sold 70–80 thousand copies). Perin was arrested the next day. Gökşin Sipahioğlu later alleged the NSS had pressured him to do it, while Perin says Sipahioğlu himself was an agent. Perin's innocence, however, was cast into doubt after intrepid journalist Uğur Mumcu published an excerpt from a 1962 letter between Perin and the undersecretary of the NSS, Fuat Doğu, stating that in his 25 years of journalism, he had acted in full knowledge of the NSS and had not refrained from doing anything.

At 17:00, the riots started in Taksim Square, and rippled out during the evening through the old district of Beyoğlu (Pera), with smashing and looting of Greek commercial property, particularly along Yüksek Kaldırım street. By six o'clock at night, many of the Greek shops on Istanbul's main shopping street, İstiklal Avenue, were ransacked. Many commercial streets were littered with merchandise and fittings torn out of Greek-owned businesses. According to the eyewitness account of a Greek dentist, the mob chanted "Death to the Giaours" (infidels), "Massacre the Greek traitors", "Down with Europe" and "Onward to Athens and Thessaloniki" as they attacked. Predictably, the situation came soon out of control and the mobs were shouting "First your property. Then your life".

The riot died down by midnight with the intervention of the Turkish Army and declaration of martial law. The police, who supported the attacks by preparing and organizing the operations, was ordered to hold a passive stance and leave the mob to roam the streets of the city freely and commit atrocities against the civilian population. The Turkish militia and police who coordinated the attacks refrained from protecting the lives and properties of the victims. Their function, instead, was to preserve adjacent Turkish properties. However, there were a few cases where police officers prevented criminal activity. On the other hand, the fire brigade, whenever it reached a fire, claimed that it was unable to deal with it.

=== Related violence ===
According to some sources, between 13 and 16 Greeks (including two clerics) and 1 Armenian died as a result of the pogrom. However, a number of deaths were never recorded due to the general chaos, so estimates vary. An early source gives the number of dead as 0, but witness accounts, mortal remains, as well as later sources contradict this. According to a number of other sources the total death toll is estimated to be at least 30. A list of 37 dead has also been compiled. Apart from the 30 identified victims, 3 unidentified bodies were found inside the shops, while another 3 burned bodies were found in a sack in the region of Beşiktaş. Moreover, 32 Greeks were severely wounded. Men and women were raped and forced to convert to Islam, and according to accounts including those of the Turkish writer Aziz Nesin, men, including a priest, were subjected to forced circumcision by members of the mob. Moreover, an Armenian rite Christian priest died after the procedure. Priests were also scalped and burnt in their beds. Nesin wrote:

A man who was fearful of being beaten, lynched or cut into pieces would imply and try to prove that he was both a Turk and a Muslim. "Pull it out and let us see," they would reply. The poor man would peel off his trousers and show his "Muslimness" and "Turkishness": And what was the proof? That he had been circumcised. If the man was circumcised, he was saved. If not, he was doomed. Indeed, having lied, he could not be saved from a beating. For one of those aggressive young men would draw his knife and circumcise him in the middle of the street and amid the chaos. A difference of two or three centimetres does not justify such a commotion. That night, many men shouting and screaming were Islamized forcefully by the cruel knife. Among those circumcised there was also a priest.

=== Material damage and cost ===
The material damage was considerable, with damage to 5317 properties, almost all Greek-owned. Among these were 4214 homes, 1004 businesses, 73 churches, 26 schools, two monasteries, and a synagogue. Over 4,000 Greek-owned businesses, over 1,000 Greek-owned homes, 110 hotels, 73 Greek (and other Christian) churches, 27 pharmacies, 23 schools, and 21 factories were badly damaged or destroyed. The American consulate estimates that 59% of the businesses were Greek-owned, 17% were Armenian-owned, 12% were Jewish-owned, and 10% were Muslim-owned; while 80% of the homes were Greek-owned, 9% were Armenian-owned, 3% were Jewish-owned, and 5% were Muslim-owned.

Estimates of the economic cost of the damage vary from Turkish government's estimate of 69.5 million Turkish lira (equivalent to 24.8 million US$), a British estimate of 100 million GBP (about 200 million US$), the World Council of Churches' estimate of 150 million USD, and the Greek government's estimate of US$500 million. The Turkish government paid 60 million Turkish lira of restitution to those who registered their losses. However, these reparations did not exceed 20% of the claims, at best given that assets had depreciated dramatically.

==== Church property ====
Representatives of the World Council of Churches investigating the vandalized sarcophaguses of the deceased Ecumenical Patriarchs, in the Patriarchal cemetery in Balıklı.

In addition to commercial targets, the mob clearly targeted property owned or administered by the Greek Orthodox Church. 73 churches and 23 schools were vandalized, burned or destroyed, as were eight baptisteries and three monasteries, about 90 percent of the church property portfolio in the city. The ancient Byzantine church of Panagia in Belgradkapı was vandalised and burned down. The church at Yedikule was badly vandalised, as was the church of St. Constantine of Psammathos. At Zoodochos Pege church in Balıklı, the tombs of a number of ecumenical patriarchs were smashed open and desecrated. The abbot of the monastery, Bishop Gerasimos of Pamphilos, was severely beaten during the pogrom and died from his wounds some days later in Balıklı Hospital. In one church arson attack, Father Chrysanthos Mandas was burned alive. The Metropolitan of Liloupolis, Gennadios, was badly beaten and went mad.

Elsewhere in the city, the Greek cemetery of Şişli, as well as the cemetery of the Patriarchates in Balıklı were targeted. Crosses and statues were vandalized, while sepulchers and burial vaults were opened and the remains of the dead were removed and dispersed by the fanatic mobs. At Balıklı cemetery, the sarcophaguses of the Greek Orthodox Patriarchs were desecrated.

=== Witnesses ===
An eyewitness account was provided by journalist Noel Barber of the London Daily Mail on 14 September 1955:

The church of Yedikule was utterly smashed, and one priest was dragged from bed, the hair torn from his head and the beard literally torn from his chin. Another old Greek priest [Fr Mantas] in a house belonging to the church and who was too ill to be moved was left in bed, and the house was set on fire and he was burned alive. At the church of Yeniköy, a lovely spot on the edge of the Bosporus, a priest of 75 was taken out into the street, stripped of every stitch of clothing, tied behind a car and dragged through the streets. They tried to tear the hair of another priest, but failing that, they scalped him, as they did many others.

On the occasion of the pogrom's 50th anniversary, a seventy-year-old Mehmet Ali Zeren said, "I was in the street that day and I remember very clearly...In a jewelry store, one guy had a hammer and he was breaking pearls one by one."

One famous eyewitness was James Bond novelist Ian Fleming, who as an MI6 agent was present under the cover of the International Police Conference on 5 September (which he ditched in favour of covering the riots for The Sunday Times). Fleming's account was published on 11 September, bearing the title "The Great Riot of Istanbul". It has been said that Fleming may have been tipped off by Nâzim Kalkavan, the Istanbul station chief of the MI6, who appears in 1957's From Russia, with Love as "Darko Kerim". According to Fleming's biographer, John Pearson, Kalkavan was rather like Kerim bey.

A number of Turkish eyewitness accounts were published in 2008 by Ayşe Hür in an article that appeared in Taraf.

=== Resistance ===
There are accounts of protection offered to the minorities by their fellow citizens that were successful in fending off the mob. The most organized team rallied behind air force captain Reşat Mater. Mater happened to be off duty and visiting his home in Cevizli's Muhasebeciler Street, which was right next to the rally point, İstiklal Caddesi. Mater first hid some of his neighbors in his house, then he took to the street with his gun and his uniform. The boys in the neighborhood joined him, bringing domestic implements as substitute weapons. The mob passed by after seeing the barricade.

Mater later rose all the way to Commander of the Air Force, making him third in the military line of command. His son Tayfun, who witnessed the pogrom, maintains ties with those who survived and fled to Greece.

=== Secondary action ===
While the pogrom was predominantly an Istanbul affair, there were some outrages in other Turkish cities. On the morning of 7 September 1955 In İzmir, a mob overran Kültürpark, where the 24th edition of the İzmir International Fair was taking place, and burned the Greek pavilion. Moving next to the Church of Saint Fotini, built two years earlier to serve the needs of the NATO Regional Headquarters' Greek officers, the mob destroyed it completely. The homes of the few Greek families and officers were then looted. The mob burned down the Greek consulate building in Alsancak.

=== Documentation ===
Considerable contemporary documentation showing the extent of the destruction is provided by the photographs taken by Demetrios Kaloumenos, then official photographer of the Ecumenical Patriarchate. Setting off just hours after the pogrom began, Kaloumenos set out with his camera to capture the damage and smuggled the film to Greece. Famous Turkish photojournalist of Armenian descent, Ara Güler, also took many photographs during the pogrom.

== Reactions ==
=== In Greece ===
In Greece, Oktay Engin and consulate employee Hasan Uçar were arrested on 18 September. Engin was first charged with executing the attack, but he presented an alibi so the charge was dropped to incitement. He was detained for nine months. Three months later, he escaped to Turkey before the Greek courts sentenced him to 3.5 years. In addition, Turkey refused Greece's extradition request.

=== In Turkey ===
After the events, 3,151 people were immediately arrested, the number of arrested later rose to 5,104. On 7 September, the Menderes government closed the "Cyprus is Turkish" Association (CTA) and arrested its executives. 34 trade unions were dissolved. The Minister of Internal Affairs Namık Gedik resigned on 10 September.

The investigation initially focused on the "Cyprus is Turkish" Association (CTA). A CTA detainee and spy, Kamil Önal, had one of his CTA associates burn an intelligence report originating from the National Security Service (NSS) that was at the CTA office. In addition, a member from the Kızıltoprak branch, Serafim Sağlamel, was found to be carrying an address list of non-Muslim citizens. However, on September 12, the government blamed Turkish Communists for the pogrom, arresting 45 "card-carrying communists" (including Aziz Nesin, Kemal Tahir, and İlhan Berktay). This type of "false flag" anti-Communist propaganda was a staple of the Counter-Guerrilla. When opposition leader İsmet İnönü delivered a speech criticizing the government for rounding up innocent people instead of the actual perpetrators, the communists were released in December 1955. An angry Menderes said that İnönü would not be forgiven for his speech, pardoning the communists.

87 CTA leaders were released in December 1955, while 17 were taken to court on 12 February 1956. The indictment initially blamed the CTA only for inciting some students to burn Greek newspapers in Taksim Square. In response to police chief Kemal Aygün's question about the Cominform's role in the affair, Şevki Mutlugil of the NSS cooked up a report, which concluded that the Comintern and Cominform had conspired to sabotage NATO. As proof, the prosecution submitted some brochures from the Communist Party of Turkey and a pair of letters from Nâzım Hikmet which called on the workers of Cyprus to stand against imperialism. To bolster the claims, the indictment claimed that NSS agent Kamil Önal had contacted the Comintern while on duty in Lebanon and defected, effectively exonerating the NSS.

The remaining prisoners were released on 12 January 1957 for lack of evidence, by order of the Istanbul First Penal Court (Turkish: İstanbul 1. Ceza Mahkemesi).

=== International ===
The chargé d'affaires at the British Embassy in Ankara, Michael Stewart, directly implicated Menderes' Demokrat Parti in the execution of the attack. "There is fairly reliable evidence that local Demokrat Parti representatives were among the leaders of the rioting in various parts of Istanbul, notably in the Marmara islands, and it has been argued that only the Demokrat Parti had the political organisation in the country capable of demonstrations on the scale that occurred," he reported, refusing to assign blame to the party as a whole or Menderes personally, however. The Foreign Office pointedly underscored the fact that British citizens were also victims of the attack.

Although British ambassador to Ankara, Bowker, advised British Foreign Secretary Harold Macmillan that the United Kingdom should "court a sharp rebuff by admonishing Turkey", only a note of distinctly mild disapproval was dispatched to Menderes. The context of the Cold War led Britain and the U.S. to refrain from assigning direct political blame to the Menderes government. The efforts of Greece to internationalize the cause of the Greeks in Turkey through international organizations such as the UN and NATO found little sympathy. British NATO representative Cheetham deemed it "undesirable" to probe the pogrom. U.S. representative Edwin M. Martin thought the effect on the alliance was exaggerated, and the French, Belgians and Norwegians urged the Greeks to "let bygones be bygones".

== Aftermath ==
=== Compensation payments ===
The compensation package allocated by the Turkish Assembly was only 60 million Turkish liras, while in three days requests had already been submitted totalling TL 69.6 million (US$24.8 million). While 12.7 million Turkish liras were given to churches for compensation out of 39 million Turkish liras claimed for damages, the rest of the 60 million Turkish liras was distributed among applicants.

However, the compensation payments did not exceed 20% of the claims which were made, given that assets had depreciated dramatically.

=== Anti-Greek policy and Greek exodus ===
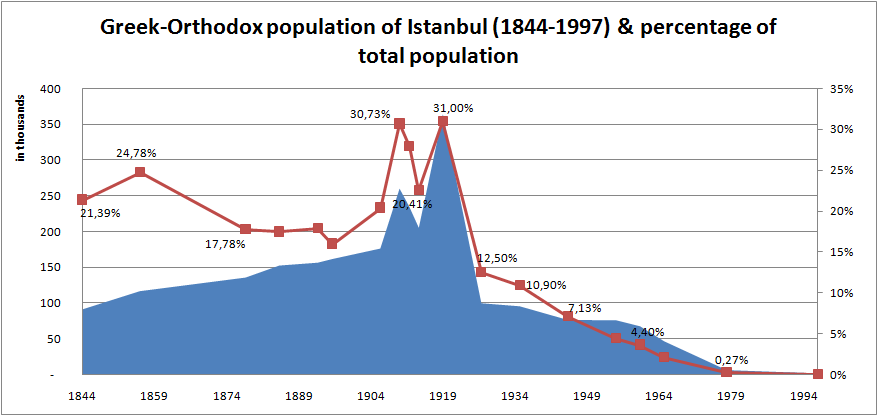
Greek population in Istanbul and percentages of the city population (1844–1997). The Turkish policies, after 1923, led virtually to the elimination of the Greek community.

Tensions continued, and in 1958–1959, Turkish nationalist students embarked on a campaign encouraging a boycott against all Greek businesses. The task was completed eight years later in 1964 when the Ankara government reneged on the 1930 Greco-Turkish Ankara Convention, which established the right of Greek établis (Greeks who were born and lived in Istanbul but held Greek citizenship) to live and work in Turkey. As a result of tensions over the Cyprus issue, Turkey prohibited all commercial dealings by Greeks holding a Greek passport resulting in the deportation from Turkey of around 40,000 ethnic Greeks. They were allowed to take with them only 20 kg of their belongings and cash of 22 dollars. Moreover, the property they left was confiscated by the Turkish state ten years later. As a result of these policies, the Greek community of Istanbul shrank from 80,000 (or 100,000 by some accounts) people in 1955 to only 48,000 in 1965. Today, the Greek community numbers about 2,500, mostly older individuals.

=== Georgian exodus ===
The Georgian community in Istanbul was also affected. It is estimated that there were about 10,000 Catholic Georgian residents in Istanbul in 1955. Most of the Georgians emigrated to Australia, Canada, Europe and the United States following the pogrom. As of 1994, there were only about 200 Catholic Georgians and a handful of Jewish Georgian families left in Istanbul.

=== Trials in Turkey ===
After the military coup of 1960, Menderes and Zorlu were charged at the Yassıada trials in 1960–61 with violating the constitution. The trial also made reference to the pogrom, for which they were blamed. The accused were denied fundamental rights regarding their defence, and they were found guilty and sentenced to death by hanging. In 1990, the Turkish parliament passed a law rehabilitating Menderes, Polatkan, and Zorlu. Adnan Menderes is one of the four political leaders of the Turkish Republic who have been honored with a mausoleum, the others being Kemal Atatürk, Süleyman Demirel, and Turgut Özal.

=== Later careers of press people involved ===
The editor of the İstanbul Ekspres, Gökşin Sipahioğlu, went on to found Sipa Press; an international photo agency based in France. The owner, Mithat Perin, already a DP member, became a parliamentarian.

=== 2005 exhibition assault ===
In 2005, Turkish nationalists attacked a photography exhibition dedicated to the fiftieth anniversary of the 1955 riots held in Istanbul. The exhibition itself was initially heralded as a major step forward for the development of democratic values in preparation of Turkey's admittance into the European Union. The military prosecutor at the time of the riots, vice admiral Fahri Çoker, kept documents and approximately 250 photographs of the events in order to educate posterity. He entrusted them to the Turkish Historical Society, stipulating that they be exhibited 25 years after his death.

Two hours prior the opening of the exhibition, a nationalist lawyer and former president of Ülkü Ocakları Ramazan Kirik, Kemal Kerinçsiz, inspected the gallery and angrily walked out. Upon the opening of the exhibition, two people stood in front of the venue shouting and announcing that this exhibition was a misrepresentation of reality and that it wasn't considerate towards the sufferings of the Turkish people.

Moments later, a 20–30 militant nationalist mob that belonged to the Ülkücüler nationalist organization raided and defaced the exhibit by hurling eggs at the photographs and trampling over them. Some of the photographs were thrown outside windows only to be stamped upon by other raiders. The raiders also distributed pamphlets and flyers that said, "Turkey is Turkish, will remain Turkish," "death to traitors," "love it or leave it," "Cyprus is Turkish and will remain Turkish," "why not the pictures from Cyprus but these," and "don't defend those who set fire to Atatürk's house."

The raid was led by Kerinçsiz and nationalist lawyer Levent Temiz who have been taken into custody in 2008 for their suspected connection with Ergenekon. The assault was described by Feyyaz Yaman, the director of the gallery, as a repeat of the 1955 rioting in itself. The President of the Turkish Historical Society Orhan Silier condemned the attacks and stated that such acts of this event "will affect Turkey's image abroad." He also mentioned that "These protests show that groups based on the same violent methods, fear and paranoia, still exist."

The incident was shown in Screamers, a 2006 documentary film about the Armenian genocide.

=== Oktay Engin's later career ===
Oktay Engin continued his studies at Istanbul University's Faculty of Law. His school in Thessaloniki refused to share his transcript, but with a certificate showing he had completed the first year, the university senate allowed Engin to continue from the second. After graduation, he started an internship in Cyprus. However, he was summoned by Orhan Öztırak, the minister of internal affairs, to monitor Greek radio stations. Next he placed first in a government exam that led to his becoming the governor (kaymakam) of the most important district, Çankaya. One year later, the chief of the police force, Hayrettin Nakipoğlu, invited him to be the chair of the Political Affairs Branch (Turkish: Siyasi İşler Şube Müdürü). Under normal conditions, reaching such a position would require 15–20 years of work, starting from his position as a district governor. He remained in the police force thereafter, working his way up to the chief of the security department, and the deputy chief of the entire police force. Finally, in 1991 he was promoted to the governorship of Nevşehir Province. Engin rejects all allegations of culpability – indeed, of even being a spy or an acquaintance of General Yirmibeşoğlu.

== Classification as genocide ==
The pogrom is occasionally described as a genocide against Greeks, since, per Alfred-Maurice de Zayas, despite its relatively low number of deaths, it "satisfies the criteria of article 2 of the 1948 Convention on the Prevention and Punishment of the Crime of Genocide (UNCG) because the intent to destroy in whole or in part the Greek minority in Istanbul was demonstrably present, the pogrom having been orchestrated by the government of Turkish Prime Minister Adnan Menderes" and "As a result of the pogrom, the Greek minority eventually emigrated from Turkey."

Turkish-Armenian historian Nazan Maksudyan writes that the pogrom must be understood "in the context of the genocidal policies of the Ottoman Empire". Turkish academics Sibel Özbudun and Temel Demirer agree with this assessment and also link the Special Warfare Department, which organized the pogrom, to the Special Organization, which organized the genocides.

Turkish journalist Erdal Boyoğlu believes that the pogrom was "a complete genocide against the Greeks, as well as plunder". Turkish author Hakkı Taşdemir calls it a planned genocide attempt to eliminate the Greek presence in Istanbul, which he believes wasn't entirely successful because most residents of Istanbul did not join the mob and some of them resisted the attackers.

== Legacy ==
In August 1995, U.S. Senator Al D'Amato introduced Senate Resolution 160 in the U.S. Senate, calling on the President of the United States Bill Clinton to proclaim 6 September as a Day of Memory for the victims of the pogrom.

In 2015, on the 60th anniversary of the pogrom, representatives of the Istanbul Greek community formally asked the Turkish parliament to place the pogrom on its agenda and condemn it openly. On the 63rd anniversary of the pogrom, in 2018, HDP MP Garo Paylan submitted a motion seeking a parliamentary investigation into the pogrom, including identification of perpetrators and compensation for victims. The parliament presidency refused to even process the motion and returned it, citing "rude and hurtful" language.

== Current anti-Greek tendencies in Turkey ==
As of 2013, popular Turkish TV show Ustura Kemal allegedly portrayed the Greek people in a negative way. The show featured several Greek characters as prostitutes and traitors. This resulted in complaints by representatives of the local Greek communities, since similar tendencies triggered the outbreak of anti-Greek pogroms and massive expulsions during the 1950s and 1960s. The series' lead actor Oktay Kaynarca denied the allegations of a racially motivated scene.

== Representations in popular media ==
The story of Pains of Autumn, a 2009 Turkish drama film based on the novel by Yılmaz Karakoyunlu, takes place in Istanbul during the September 1955 pogrom. Yet, according to the Greek perspective, the film does not depict the events of September 1955 in their actual historic depth.

In 2021 Netflix aired the TV-series The Club (Turkish: Kulüp) about a night club on Istanbul's İstiklal Avenue in the 1950s. In part two, that aired in 2022, there are multiple depictions that show an anti-Greek sentiment and in the last episode the pogrom is depicted. The depiction of taboo topics such as Crypto Greeks, anti-Greek sentiment in Turkey, and Istanbul pogrom in 1955 (in part 2) was praised by members of the Greek Orthodox community in Turkey.

== See also ==
- Varlık Vergisi
- Persecution of Eastern Orthodox Christians
- Greeks in Turkey
- Racism in Turkey
