= Tactical Mobilisation Group =

Unit of the Turkish army

Special Warfare Department
- Active: 1952–1965
- Country: Turkey
- Branch: Turkish Army
- Type: Special operations

The Tactical Mobilisation Group (TMG, Turkish: Seferberlik Taktik Kurulu) was the special operations unit of the Turkish Army. It was founded in 1952 as part of NATO's efforts to establish a Counter-Guerrilla force in Turkey as the Turkish branch of Operation Gladio. It was disbanded in 1965, with special operations taken over by the new Special Warfare Department (Turkish: Özel Harp Dairesi).

In the 2000s it was revealed that the 1955 Istanbul pogrom was engineered by the TMG. Turkish Land Forces General Sabri Yirmibeşoğlu, the right-hand man of General Kemal Yamak who organised the Counter-Guerrilla through the Tactical Mobilization Group, proudly reminisced about his involvement in the riots, calling the TMG "a magnificent organization".

== History ==
With the consent of the National Defense Supreme Council (Turkish: Milli Savunma Yüksek Kurulu), brigadier general Daniş Karabelen founded the Tactical Mobilization Group (Turkish: Seferberlik Taktik Kurulu, or STK) on 27 September 1952. Karabelen was one of sixteen soldiers (including Turgut Sunalp, Ahmet Yıldız, Alparslan Türkeş, Suphi Karaman, and Fikret Ateşdağlı) who had been sent to the United States in 1948 for training in special warfare. These people were to form the core of what would later be called the Special Warfare Department (Turkish: Özel Harp Dairesi, or ÖHD). It has been said that the training also entailed an element of CIA recruitment.

Some full generals that later ran the department were Adnan Doğu, Aydın İlter, Sabri Yirmibeşoğlu, İbrahim Türkgenci, Doğan Bayazıt, and Fevzi Türkeri. Karabelen picked Ismail Tansu as his right-hand man, and they expanded the STK in a cellular fashion. They filled the ranks, mostly with reserve officers, inducted them with an oath, and educated them before allowing them to return to civilian life. The officers were given no weapons, funding, or immediate task. The recruitment was more concentrated in the east, where an invasion was most likely to occur.

== See also ==
- List of Chiefs of the Special Forces of the Turkish Army
