= Aydın İlter =

Turkish general (1930–2022)

General Commander of the Gendarmerie of Turkey
- In office 23 February 1993 – 1 September 1995
- Preceded by: Eşref Bitlis
- Succeeded by: Teoman Koman

Personal details
- Born: 1 July 1930 Foça, İzmir, Turkey
- Died: 21 April 2022 (aged 91)

Military service
- Allegiance: Turkey
- Branch/service: Turkish Army
- Years of service: 1954–1995
- Rank: General

Aydın İlter (1 July 1930 – 21 April 2022) was a Turkish general. He was General Commander of the Gendarmerie of Turkey (1993 – 1995) and previously served in the Special Warfare Department from 1963 to 1983, including as head of the Department from 1980 to 1983.
