= ÖHD =

ÖHD may mean

- Özel Harekat Dairesi - Turkish police department overseeing the Police Special Operation Teams
- Özel Harp Dairesi - the Special Warfare Department, a department of the Turkish Army from 1965 to 1992

== See also ==
- OHD (disambiguation)
