= Şükrü Sarıışık =

Turkish general

Secretary-General of the National Security Council
- In office 26 August 2003 – 16 August 2004
- Preceded by: Tuncer Kılınç
- Succeeded by: Mehmet Yiğit Alpogan

Personal details
- Born: 1945 (age 80–81) Konya

Military service
- Allegiance: Turkey
- Branch/service: Turkish Army
- Years of service: 2007
- Rank: General

Şükrü Sarıışık (born 1945, Konya) is a retired Turkish general. He was Secretary-General of the National Security Council from 2003 to 2004, and then Commander of the Second Army.

Sarıışık was appointed Commander of the Aegean Army in August 2006. He was one of a number of officers retired in August 2007 for "indiscipline".

In 2012 Sarıışık was sentenced to 18 years in prison for his role in the 2003 "Sledgehammer" coup plan.

Military offices
Preceded by Fevzi Türkeri	Commander of the 2nd Army; 17 August 2004 - 26 August 2006	Succeeded by General Hasan Iğsız
Preceded by Fethi Tuncel	Commander of the Aegean Army; August 2006 - August 2007	Succeeded by General Necdet Özel
