= Cemal Tural =

13th Chief of the General Staff of the Turkish Armed Forces from 1966 to 1969

13th Chief of the General Staff of Turkey
- In office 16 August 1966 – 16 March 1969
- Preceded by: Cevdet Sunay
- Succeeded by: Faruk Gürler

Commander of the Turkish Army
- In office 28 August 1964 – 15 March 1966
- Preceded by: Mehmet Ali Keskiner
- Succeeded by: Ahmet Refik Yılmaz

Personal details
- Born: 1905 Erzincan, Ottoman Empire
- Died: 17 December 1981 (aged 75–76)
- Education: Kuleli Military High School
- Alma mater: Turkish Military Academy

Military service
- Allegiance: Turkey
- Branch/service: Turkish Land Forces
- Years of service: 1923–1969
- Rank: General

Cemal Tural (1905, Erzincan – 17 December 1981, Istanbul) was a Turkish general. He was the 13th Chief of the General Staff of Turkey and previously Commander of the Turkish Army (1964-1966), Commander of the First Army of Turkey (1960-1962) and Commander of the Second Army of Turkey (1963-1964). He retired on August 16, 1969. He was elected president of the Nation Party in 1973, but shortly thereafter resigned from the post in 1974. He was appointed as Ambassador to South Korea in 1976 and Ambassador to Pakistan in 1981.

== Awards and order ==
- State Medal of Distinguished Service

Military offices
Preceded by Muzaffer Alankuş	Commander of the Second Army of Turkey; 1 August 1960 - 25 September 1962	Succeeded by Ahmet Refik Yılmaz
Preceded by Refik Tulga	Commander of the Second Army of Turkey; 25 September 1963 - 28 August 1964	Succeeded by Kemalettin Gökakın
Preceded by Mehmet Ali Keskiner	Commander of the Turkish Army; 28 August 1964 - 15 March 1966	Succeeded by Ahmet Refik Yılmaz
Preceded by Cevdet Sunay	Chief of the General Staff of Turkey; 16 August 1966 - 16 March 1969	Succeeded by Memduh Tağmaç
