= National Security Council (Turkey) =

Turkish government agency

- Milli Güvenlik Kurulu

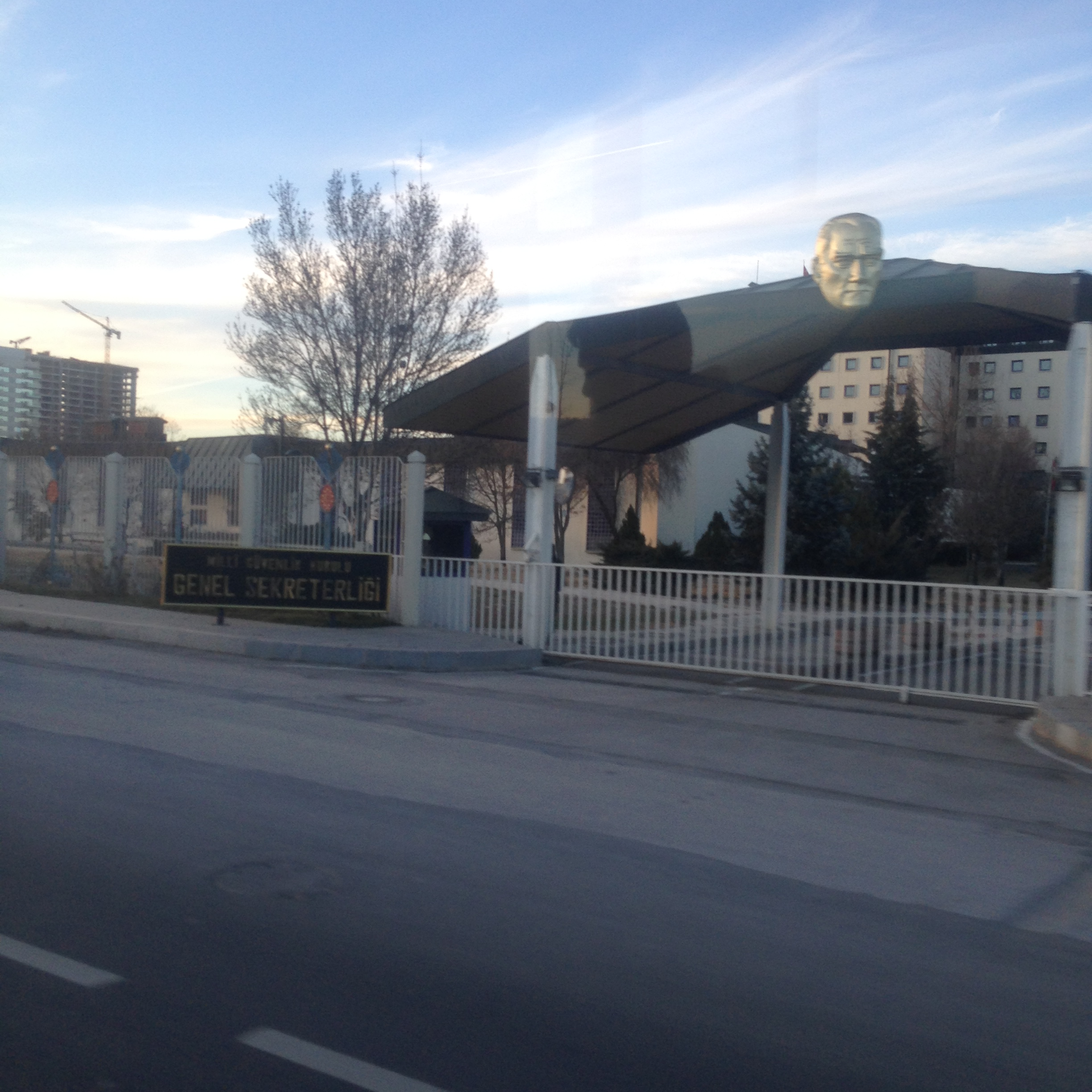
- National Security Council seat in Ankara

Agency overview
- Formed: December 11, 1962
- Preceding agencies: Yüksek Müdafaa Meclisi (1933–1949); Milli Savunma Yüksek Kurulu (1949–1962)
- Jurisdiction: President Recep Tayyip Erdoğan (chairman)
- Headquarters: Presidential Complex; 39°54′32″N 32°45′33″E
- Annual budget: ₺ 34.8 million (2019)
- Agency executive: Seyfullah Hacımüftüoğlu, Secretary-General
- Website: mgk.gov.tr

The National Security Council (Turkish: Milli Güvenlik Kurulu, MGK) is the principal government agency used by the President of Turkey (who is the commander-in-chief) for consideration of national security, military, and foreign policy matters with senior national security officials, and for coordinating these policies among various government agencies. Like the national security councils of other countries, the MGK develops the national security policy.

The policy is expressed in the National Security Policy Document (Turkish: Milli Güvenlik Siyaseti Belgesi), commonly known as "The Red Book". The Red Book is sometimes called the "most secret" document in Turkey. It is updated once or twice a decade.

== History ==
The creation of the MGK was an outcome of the 1960 military coup, and has been a part of the constitution since 1961. In this way the 1961 constitution created what the Turkish scholar Sakallioğlu labels "a double headed political system: the civilian council of ministers coexisted with the national security council on the executive level, and the military system of justice continued to operate independently alongside the civilian justice system."

The role of the MGK was further strengthened with the 1982 constitution, adopted by the military junta in the aftermath of the 1980 military coup, before transferring power to civilian politicians. From then on its recommendations would be given priority consideration by the council of ministers. Furthermore, the number and weight of senior military commanders in MGK increased at the expense of its civilian members. In 1992 then chief of general staff Gen. Doğan Güreş proclaimed self-confidently that "Turkey is a military state".

== The role of the military in Turkish politics ==
The MGK is widely perceived as the institutionalisation of the Turkish military's influence over politics. Since Mustafa Kemal Atatürk founded the modern secular republic of Turkey in 1923, the Turkish military has perceived itself as guardian of Kemalism, the official state ideology, even though Atatürk himself insisted separating the military from politics.

Though the attitude of the military may have remained constant, the attitude of the successive civilian governments toward the military has fluctuated, according to Metin Heper: "In Turkey, for a long time, there have been two notable behavioral patterns on the part of civilian governments in their relations with the military: they have either tried to relegate the military to the sidelines or they have granted it too much autonomy." When the civilian government was successful in solving economic problems and internal disputes and "had the upper hand," sometimes as in the 1950s, the civilian government "tried to divest the military of all authority" and the government and military officers became "hostile adversaries."

As a result of these fluctuations in the relationship, there have been two direct coups d’états in 1960 and 1980, the 1971 coup by memorandum, and what later has been labelled a "post modern coup", when Prime Minister Necmettin Erbakan from the pro-Islamic Welfare Party stepped down after mounting pressure from the military in 1997. Paradoxically, the military has both been an important force in Turkey's continuous Westernization but at the same time also represents an obstacle for Turkey's desire to join the EU. At the same time, the military enjoys a high degree of popular legitimacy, with continuous opinion polls suggesting that the military is the state institution that the Turkish people trust the most.

== Recent reforms ==
In order to meet EU's political demands for starting membership negotiations, the Copenhagen criteria, Turkey has passed a number of reforms aiming at strengthening civilian control over the military. These reforms have mainly focused on the MGK, its duties, functioning and composition. On 23 July 2003 the Turkish Grand National Assembly passed the "seventh reform package", which aimed at limiting the role of the military, through reforms of the MGK. According to an editorial in the Financial Times the seventh reform package constitutes nothing less than a "quiet revolution".

Firstly it is underlined that the MGK is a consultative body, now with a civilian majority. The 7th reform package made it possible to appoint a civilian Secretary General of the MGK, which happened for the first time in August 2004. The council has not anymore expanded executive and monitoring authorities, and has for instance not any more the authority on behalf of the president and the prime minister to follow up on the implementation of the MGK's ‘recommendations’. In addition, the MGK no longer has unlimited access to all civil institutions. The MGK no longer has a representative in the Supervision Board of Cinema, Video and Music. It was however still represented in civil institutions such as the High Board for Radio and TV (RTÜK) and the Commission for Higher Education (YÖK), but after critics in the 2003 European Commission report this representation was withdrawn from both institutions in 2004.

Despite the impressive institutional changes, the 2004 European Commission report concludes that "Although the process of aligning civil-military relations with EU practice is underway, the Armed Forces in Turkey continue to exercise influence through a series of informal channels." In the Commission report of the following year it was stated that: "Reforms concerning civil-military relations have continued, but the armed forces still exert significant influence by issuing public statements on political developments and government policies."

Before the reforms, the MGK covertly influenced public opinion through its Public Relations Command (Turkish: Toplumla İlişkiler Başkanlığı). The department has been disbanded.

== Council members ==
Member	Office
Recep Tayyip Erdoğan	President
Cevdet Yılmaz	Vice President
Yılmaz Tunç	Minister of Justice
Ali Yerlikaya	Minister of the Interior
Hakan Fidan	Minister of Foreign Affairs
Yaşar Güler	Minister of National Defense
General Metin Gürak	Chief of the General Staff
General Selçuk Bayraktaroğlu	Commander of the Land Forces
Admiral Ercüment Tatlıoğlu	Commander of the Naval Forces
General Ziya Cemal Kadıoğlu	Commander of the Air Force

== List of secretaries general ==
Rank	Name	From	To
Major General	Mehmet Tevfik Erdönmez	9 April 1938	28 August 1939
Lieutenant General	Galip Türker	28 August 1939	13 June 1940
Lieutenant General	M.Rasim Aktağun	13 June 1940	21 April 1941
Major General	Hüseyin Avni Üler	1 April 1942	9 August 1942
Lieutenant General	Mümtaz Aktay	18 March 1943	1 May 1945
Lieutenant General	M.Rıfat Mataracı	3 May 1945	14 July 1945
Lieutenant General	Muzaffer Ergüder	28 February 1946	10 April 1946
Lieutenant General	Fuat Erdem	10 April 1946	14 July 1948
Lieutenant General	Kurtcebe Noyan	27 September 1948	1 July 1949
Lieutenant General	Yümnü Üresin	11 July 1949	28 April 1950
Lieutenant General	Kurtcebe Noyan	25 May 1950	6 June 1950
General	Mahmut Berköz	13 June 1950	6 September 1951
General	İzzet Aksalur	4 October 1951	5 November 1952
Lieutenant General	Nazmi Ataç	5 November 1952	29 September 1955
Major General	Mehmet Enver Aka	24 January 1956	29 August 1956
General	Selahattin Selışık	4 September 1956	31 August 1959
General	Vedat Garan	10 September 1959	4 August 1960
Major General	Celal Erikan	16 September 1960	28 November 1960
Colonel	Mahmut Demircioğlu	29 November 1960	12 February 1961
Colonel	Tarık Demiroğlu	13 February 1961	24 September 1961
Major General	Nüzhet Akıncılar	25 September 1961	18 October 1961
Brigadier General	M. Şevket Ozan	23 November 1961	14 August 1962
Lieutenant General	Refet Ülgenalp	14 August 1962	11 July 1966
General	Kemalaetin Gökakın	18 July 1966	30 August 1969
General	Haydar Olcaynoyan	30 August 1969	30 August 1970
General (Air Force)	Emin Alpkaya	28 August 1970	28 August 1972
General (Air Force)	Nahit Özgür	28 August 1972	30 August 1975
General	Namık Kemal Ersun	24 August 1975	1 January 1976
General	Nurettin Ersin	5 January 1976	30 August 1977
General (Air Force)	Tahsin Şahinkaya	5 September 1977	24 August 1978
Admiral (Navy)	Arif Akdoğanlar	25 August 1978	8 August 1980
General (Air Force)	Halil Sözer	18 August 1980	8 October 1980
Lieutenant General	Talat Çetineli	8 October 1980	30 August 1981
General (Air Force)	Halit Nusret Toroslu	24 August 1981	30 August 1985
Admiral (Navy)	Orhan Karabulut	19 August 1985	20 August 1986
General	Hüsnü Çelenkler	21 August 1986	30 August 1987
Admiral (Navy)	İrfan Tınaz	26 August 1987	22 August 1988
General	Sabri Yirmibeşoğlu	22 August 1988	30 August 1990
General	Nezihi Çakar	21 August 1990	30 August 1992
General (Air Force)	Ahmet Çörekçi	21 August 1992	9 August 1993
General	Doğan Bayazıt	22 August 1993	17 August 1995
General (Air Force)	İlhan Kılıç	17 August 1995	27 August 1997
General (Air Force)	Ergin Celasin	27 August 1997	24 August 1999
General (Air Force)	Cumhur Asparuk	27 August 1999	26 August 2001
General	Tuncer Kılınç	26 August 2001	26 August 2003
General	Şükrü Sarıışık	26 August 2003	16 August 2004
Ambassador (First civilian)	Mehmet Yiğit Alpogan	1 October 2004	16 July 2007
Ambassador	Tahsin Burcuoğlu	1 November 2007	25 January 2010
Ambassador	Serdar Kılıç	5 February 2010	17 April 2012
Governor	Muammer Türker	25 April 2012	25 September 2014
Governor	Seyfullah Hacımüftüoğlu	26 September 2014	Incumbent

== See also ==
- Politics of Turkey
- Supreme Military Council
- National security
- Committee to Coordinate the Struggle with the Baseless Genocide Claims
- Political polarization in Turkey
