= İsmail Metin Temel =

Turkish former general (born 1958)

- Born: 12 March 1958 (age 68); Adana, Turkey
- Military career
- Allegiance: Turkey
- Branch: Turkish Land Forces
- Service years: 1981–2020
- Rank: General
- Commands: Second Army of Turkey
- Conflicts: Kurdish–Turkish conflict (1978–present) Turkish involvement in the Syrian Civil War: Operation Euphrates Shield; 2016 Dabiq offensive; Battle of al-Bab; Operation Olive Branch

İsmail Metin Temel (12 March 1958, Adana) is a Turkish former commander of the Second Army. He was the commander of Turkish forces in Syria from 2016 to 2018.

== Biography ==
İsmail Metin Temel was born in 1958 in Adana. His family settled in Adana from Bayburt in the 1970s. He joined the Turkish Army in 1981. In 2012, Temel was appointed Commander of the 3rd Tactical Infantry Division/Yuksekova Hakkari. In 2016, General Temel, by now Commander of the Van Gendarmerie Public Security Corps, was appointed Commander of the Second Army.

== Military career ==
Temel has commanded two campaigns. The first was Operation Euphrates Shield, in which he and Lt. Gen. Zekai Aksakallı began the Turkish occupation of northern Syria. His second campaign, the Turkish military operation in Afrin, came amid growing tensions between the Turkish and American governments over the latter's support of the Syrian Democratic Forces (SDF). The SDF includes the People's Protection Units (YPG), which the Turkish government describes as a branch of the Kurdistan Workers' Party (PKK). In particular, the Turkish state objected to announced plans by the US to train and equip a 30,000-strong Syrian Border Security Force, which it claimed posed a direct threat to their security. On 31 December 2018, Temel was appointed to the General Staff's Directorate of Audit and Evaluation, by presidential decree.

Military offices
Preceded by Adem Huduti	Commander of the Second Army of Turkey; 18 July 2016 - 31 December 2018	Succeeded by Sinan Yayla
