= Memduh Tağmaç =

14th Chief of the General Staff of the Turkish Armed Forces from 1969 to 1972

14th Chief of the General Staff of Turkey
- In office 16 March 1969 – 29 August 1972
- President: Cevdet Sunay
- Preceded by: Cemal Tural
- Succeeded by: Faruk Gürler

Commander of the Turkish Army
- In office 23 August 1968 – 16 March 1969
- Preceded by: Ahmet Refik Yılmaz
- Succeeded by: Fikret Esen

Personal details
- Born: 1 September 1904 Narman, Erzurum, Ottoman Empire
- Died: 30 March 1978 (aged 73) Istanbul, Turkey
- Resting place: Zincirlikuyu Cemetery
- Education: Kuleli Military High School
- Alma mater: Turkish Military Academy

Military service
- Allegiance: Turkey
- Branch/service: Turkish Land Forces
- Years of service: 1926–1973
- Rank: General

Memduh Tağmaç (1904, Erzurum – 30 March 1978) was a Turkish general. He was the 14th Chief of the General Staff of Turkey during the 1971 Turkish coup d'état, and previously Commander of the Turkish Army (1968-1969) and Commander of the First Army of Turkey (1966-1968).
