= Belgradkapı =

Coordinates: 41°00′00″N 28°55′11″E

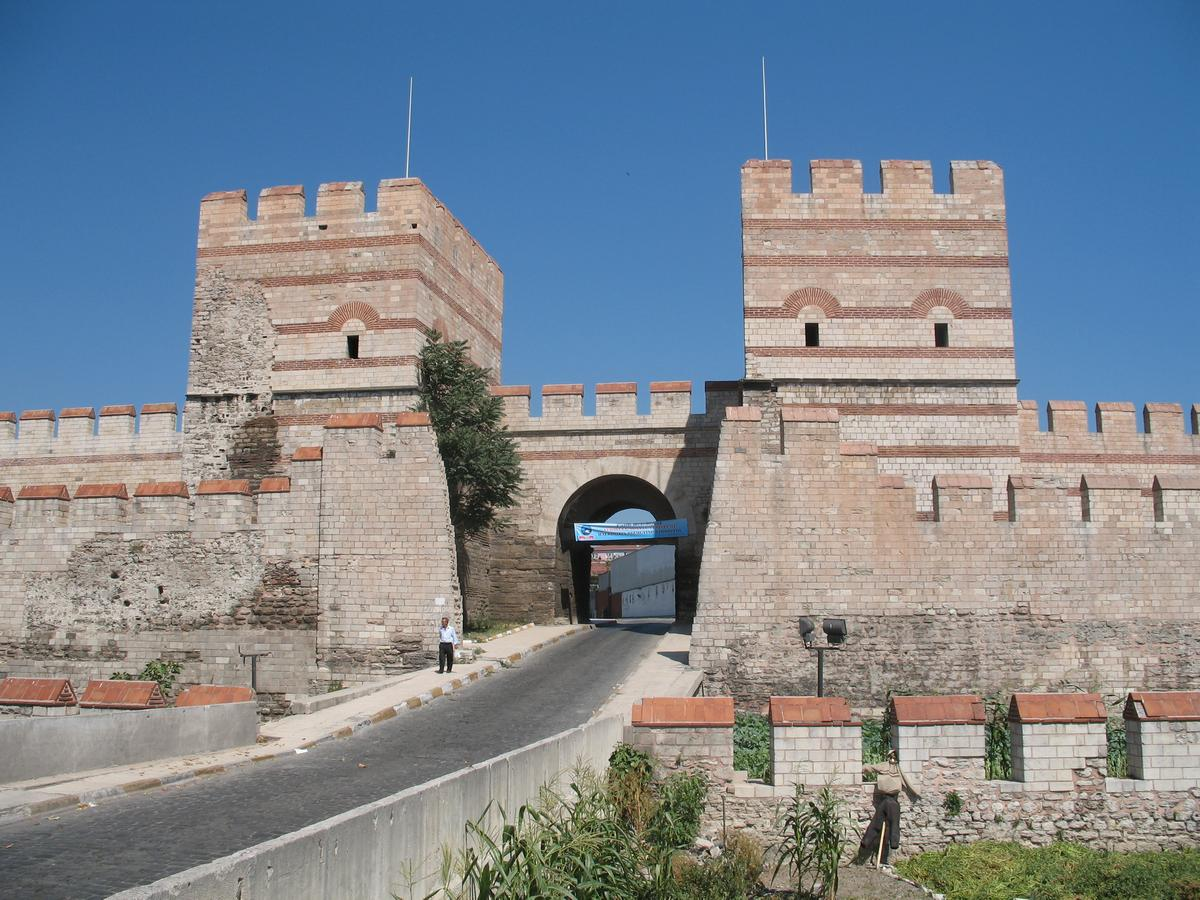
Restored section of city walls at Belgradkapı Gate, close to Marmara coast

Belgradkapı (lit. 'Belgrade Gate') is a quarter in Zeytinburnu district of Istanbul, Turkey. Name of the neighborhood means Belgrade Gate in Turkish, and was named so after the Ottoman sultan Suleiman the Magnificent conquered Belgrade in 1521, modern capital of Serbia, and resettled its population to several locations in Istanbul, including the present Belgradkapı area.

== Location ==
Belgradkapı is located on both sides of the Belgrade Gate at the Walls of Istanbul in the European part of the city.

== History ==
After conquering Belgrade in 1521, sultan Suleiman the Magnificent resettled town's population. He relocated several groups to Constantinople itself, in areas which became known as Belgrade Forest and Belgrade Gate (Belgrad Ormanı and Belgradkapı, respectively).

Following the usual pattern of the day, ethnic groups were specialized in certain crafts and jobs. Inhabitants of Belgrade Forest worked on maintenance of the freshwater reservoirs in the forest. The water was then transferred via aqueducts to downtown. There are no surviving records on the specialization of the residents of Belgradkapı, but based on the surviving artifacts and memorials from that period, they were probably in the business of leather crafting.

In general, except for few Orthodox churches ("mostly built to be inconspicuous, hidden behind high walls"), there aren't other physical remainders of Belgraders who lived in Istanbul. The subject wasn't much studied by Serbian scientists, especially not since the 1950s, so the fate of Belgrade population is unknown: were all of them assimilated, or some survived and moved back to Serbia after independence in the early 19th century. It also remains unknown why one group was settled outside of the city walls (Belgrade Forest) and other inside (Belgrade Gate).

== Characteristics ==
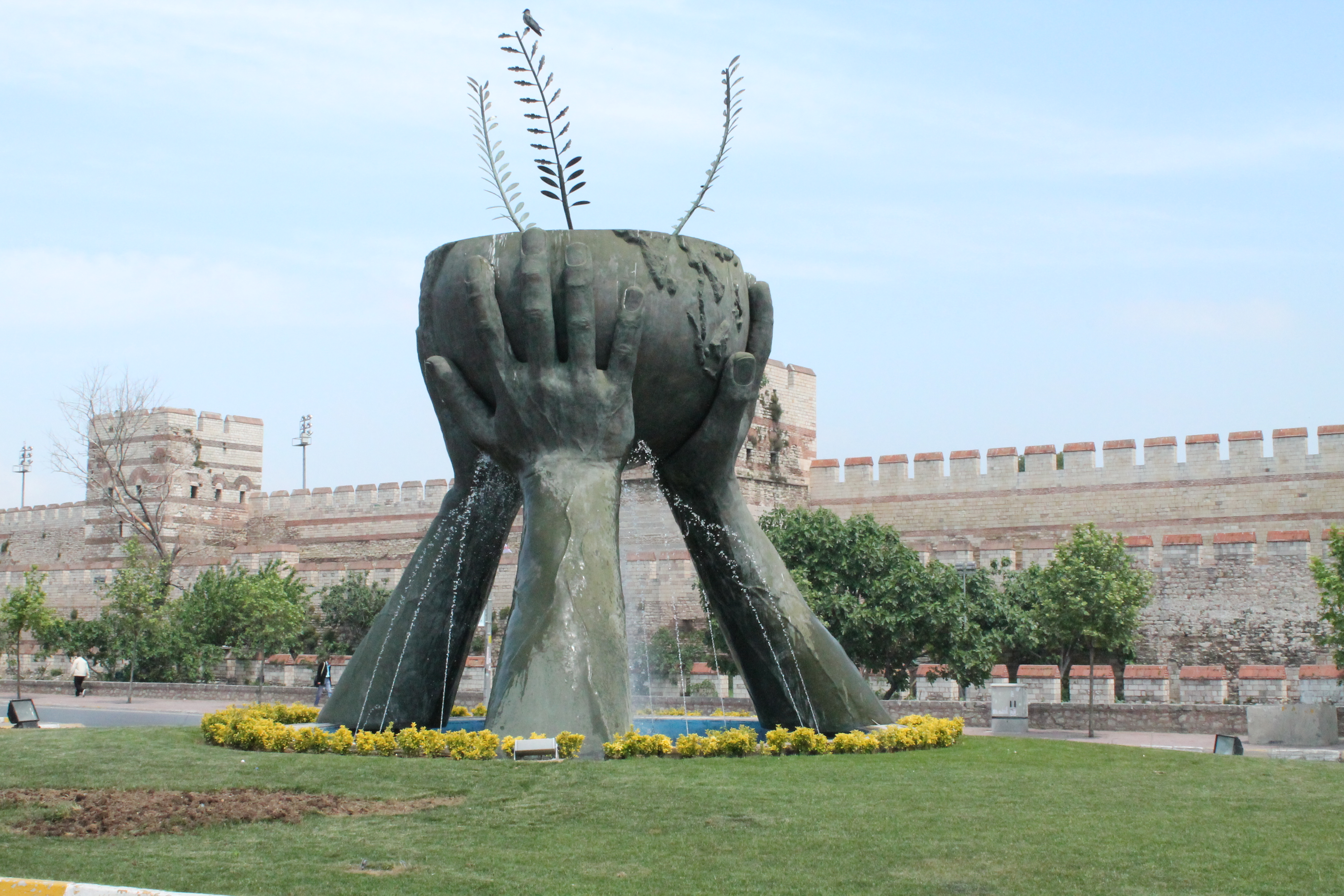
Belgradkapı Memorial

The main axis of the quarter is the avenue with the same name (Turkish: Belgradkapı Caddesi) that runs between Yedikule and Silivrikapı. Recently, many ancient sarcophagi have been discovered in Belgradkapı, in archeological excavations.

== Church of Theotokos Belgradkapı ==
The church was designed by Greek architect Hadji Nikolaos and built by Greek masons. The edifice is actually a low house, built from stone. It has neither dome nor bell tower, and is fenced with wall which obstructs view on the church. The church was damaged during the 1955 Istanbul pogrom. The rioting mob broke into the church, setting the building on fire and destroying iconostasis, icons and all relics. The church was slowly renovated in the next 10 years.

Some Turkish historians believed that ktetor was also from Belgrade. They based it, among other, on Slavic Cyrillic inscription on the walls. However, the inscription, and adjoining crosses, are much younger, originated from 1837 and were carved by master Siljan from Vrben, near Debar, in modern North Macedonia. The Debar masters were highly regarded at the time and were hired to ornament Orthodox churches throughout the Balkans.

The church was studied in the 19th century by historian Stojan Novaković, who studied the lives of Belgraders in Istanbul. In 1953 it was surveyed by architect Aleksandar Deroko, who searched for medieval icons. Novaković believed that the icons originated from Metropolitanate of Belgrade, when the population was relocated in 1521. The icons had a year 1539 on them, but Novaković believed this was added later. Based on his research, Deroko examined the icons later, but based on their style characteristics, couldn't confirm they predated 1521. Additionally, he contested that, if the icons were brought from Belgrade, there would be no need for the new icons to be made only 18 years later. The science and folk narrative on the origin of icons diverged, but they were destroyed two years after Deroko examined them who, at least, took photos of the interior.

== See also ==
- Belgrad Forest
- Gallipoli Serbs
