= Engin Alan =

Turkish lieutenant general

- Born: March 31, 1945 (age 81); Üsküdar
- Military career
- Allegiance: Turkey
- Branch: Turkish Land Forces
- Service years: 1965–2005
- Rank: Lieutenant general
- Commands: 16th Armed Brigade; Special Forces Command; 2nd Corps; 8th Corps; Logistics Command
- Conflicts: Turkish invasion of Cyprus; Kurdish-Turkish conflict

Engin Alan (born 31 March 1945 in Istanbul) is a former Turkish general. He was Chief of the Special Forces of the Turkish Army from 1996 to 2000. He retired in 2005.

After his retirement he became General Director of the Foundation to Strengthen the Turkish Armed Forces (TSKGV), and was later charged in the Sledgehammer coup plan trials, relating to an alleged 2003 plot. In the 2011 Turkish general election he was elected to the Grand National Assembly of Turkey representing Istanbul for the Nationalist Movement Party. A court ruled against releasing Alan so that he could take up his seat.

In 2012, he was sentenced to 18 years for his role in the Sledgehammer coup plan, and later detained in connection with the 1997 "post-modern coup". He remained an MP while the case was under appeal. He was acquitted in 2015.

Military offices
Preceded by Fevzi Türkeri	Commander of the Turkish Special Forces; 1996 - 2000	Succeeded by Nevzat Bekaroğlu
