= Nafiz Gürman =

5th Chief of the General Staff of the Turkish Armed Forces from 1949 to 1950

Nafiz Gürman 1319-P. 5
- Born: 1882; Bodrum, Aidin Vilayet, Ottoman Empire
- Died: 6 February 1966 (aged 83–84); Istanbul, Turkey
- Burial place: Zincirlikuyu Mezarlığı (later transferred to State Cemetery)
- Education: Turkish Military Academy
- Military career
- Allegiance: Ottoman Empire; Turkey
- Branch: (Ottoman Empire) Ottoman Army; Turkish Land Forces
- Service years: Ottoman Empire: 1903–1919; Turkey: 2 March 1921 – 6 July 1950
- Rank: General
- Commands: Chief of Staff of the Aleppo Regular Division; Chief of Staff of the 26th Division; Military advisor of Tolipolitania; Chief of Staff of the Africa Groups; 148th Regiment; Chief of Staff of the Africa Groups; Chief of Staff of the I Corps; 1st Division; Chief of Staff of the Thrace Command; Chief of Staff of the Second Army; V Corps (Deputy); VI Corps; IX Corps; Undersecretary of the Ministry of National Defense; Inspector of the Second Army; Member of the Supreme Military Council; Chief of the General Staff
- Conflicts: Italo-Turkish War; Balkan Wars; First World War; Turkish War of Independence
- Other work: Member of the Constituent Assembly

Abdurrahman Nafiz Gürman (1882; Bodrum – 6 February 1966; Istanbul) was a Turkish military officer of the Ottoman Army and a general of the Turkish Army. He fought in the Caucasus campaign during World War I. He later joined the forces of Atatürk and participated in the Turkish War of Independence. After his retirement in 1949, he was the Turkish Ambassador to South Korea and Pahlavi Iran, until 1959.

== Works ==
- Piyadenin Muharebesi
- Piyade Takımının Muharebesi
- Alman ve Fransız Harp Usulleri Arasındaki Fark ve Bizim Bundan Edeceğimiz İstifade
- Piyade Neferi ve Mangası Muharebe İçin Nasıl Yetiştirilmeli?
- Piyade Takım ve Bölüğü Muharebe İçin Nasıl Yetiştirilmeli?
- 1912-1913 Balkan Savaşında İşkodra Müdafaası
- Büyük Harpte Kuzey Afrika'da Türkler
- İstiklâl Harbinde 1 nci Piyade Tümeni

== See also ==
- List of high-ranking commanders of the Turkish War of Independence
- List of chiefs of the Turkish General Staff

== Sources ==
Military offices
Preceded by İzzettin Çalışlar	Inspector of the Second Army; 10 January 1940–30 August 1945	Succeeded by İshak Avni Akdağ?
Preceded by Kâzım Orbay	Chief of the General Staff of Turkey; 10 June 1949–6 June 1950	Succeeded by Nuri Yamut
