= Semih Sancar =

16th Chief of the General Staff of the Turkish Armed Forces from 1973 to 1978

16th Chief of the Turkish General Staff
- In office 6 March 1973 – 7 March 1978
- President: Fahri Korutürk
- Preceded by: Faruk Gürler
- Succeeded by: Kenan Evren

Commander of the Turkish Army
- In office 28 August 1972 – 7 March 1973
- Preceded by: Faruk Gürler
- Succeeded by: Eşref Akıncı

Personal details
- Born: 7 March 1911 Erzurum, Ottoman Empire
- Died: 8 December 1984 (aged 72–73)
- Education: Kuleli Military High School
- Alma mater: Turkish Military Academy

Military service
- Allegiance: Turkey
- Branch/service: Turkish Land Forces
- Years of service: 1930–1978
- Rank: General
- Battles/wars: Cyprus War

Semih Sancar (1911 – 8 December 1984) was the 16th Chief of the Turkish General Staff from 1973 to 1978, a period including the 1974 Operation Atilla. He was previously Commander of the Turkish Land Forces (1972–1973) and General Commander of the Turkish Gendarmerie (1969–1970).

He was made a brigadier general in 1960, Major-General in 1963, lieutenant general in 1964 and was promoted to the rank of General in 1969. Commanded 4th Division as a brigadier general, also serving as Joint Chiefs of Staff Department and General Staff Operations Department, War Academies Commander attorney; with the rank of major general, 5th Corps Commander attorney and Land Forces Operations Staff Yarbaşkanlıg As a lieutenant general, in the Army Education Corps Command and Commander 9th Corps. Gen. rank in the August 29, 1969 - Gendarmerie General Command to August 29, 1970; from 1970 until August 28, 1972 commanded 2 Army Command. On August 28, 1972 he was appointed Commander of the Turkish Land Forces.

On 6 March 1973, General Sancar was appointed as the 16th Chief of the General Staff and commanded the Turkish Armed Forces during Cyprus Operation. He was offered the rank field marshal after the operation but he refused.

At the request of Special Warfare Department head General Kemal Yamak, Sancar, then the Chief of General Staff, asked Bülent Ecevit for a slush fund of 1 million dollars to support the Counter-Guerrilla programme. It was at that point Ecevit learned of its existence, and demanded a briefing.
