= Tunçer Kılınç =

Turkish general

Secretary-General of the National Security Council
- In office 26 August 2001 – 26 August 2003
- Preceded by: Cumhur Asparuk
- Succeeded by: Şükrü Sarıışık

Personal details
- Born: 25 April 1938 (age 87) Sarıkamış

Military service
- Allegiance: Turkey
- Branch/service: Turkish Army
- Years of service: 1960–2003
- Rank: General

Tunçer Kılınç (born 25 April 1938) is a retired Turkish general. He was Secretary-General of the National Security Council from 2001 to 2003. He was a defendant in the Ergenekon trials; in August 2013 he was sentenced to 13 years in prison.

At a 2007 meeting of the Atatürkist Thought Association he said that Turkey should leave NATO.

He graduated from the Turkish Military Academy in 1960 and the Army War College (Kara Harp Akademisi) in 1973.
