= Daniş Karabelen =

Turkish Army general

Daniş Karabelen (1898–1983) was a Turkish Army general who was the founder of Turkey's Tactical Mobilisation Group in 1952, and served as its chief until his retirement in 1960.

== Career ==
Karabelen was among those taken out of Military School in 1915 to participate in the Turkish defence against the Allied Gallipoli Campaign. Surviving this, he became an officer in the Turkish Army and worked closely with Mustafa Kemal Atatürk and taking a lead in developing some sports in the new Republic of Turkey, becoming Turkey's first national pole-vaulting champion.

Karabelen was one of sixteen soldiers (including Turgut Sunalp, Ahmet Yıldız, Alparslan Türkeş, Suphi Karaman, and Fikret Ateşdağlı) who were sent to the United States in 1948 for training in special warfare. These people were to form the core of what would later be called the Special Warfare Department (Turkish: Özel Harp Dairesi, or ÖHD), founded by Karabelen as the Tactical Mobilisation Group in September 1952.

Karabelen (then a Colonel) served in the Korean War from November 1952 to August 1953, as Assistant Commanding Officer of the Third Turkish Brigade. During this time he was one of 7 Turkish officers who attended the April 1953 Anzac Day commemoration in Australia, the first time Turkey had sent representatives. In 1954 he was awarded the Legion of Merit in the degree of Legionnaire by the United States Army.

Karabelen served as chief of the Tactical Mobilisation Group until his retirement in 1960.

== Books ==
- Cemal Kutay (2006), Beş Kıt'ada Bir Türk Paşası: Daniş Karabelen, Avcıol Basım Yayım
