= OHD =

OHD may refer to:

- Obsidian hydration dating
- Ohrid "St. Paul the Apostle" Airport (IATA code OHD)

== See also ==
- ÖHD (disambiguation)
