= Nuri Yamut =

6th Chief of the General Staff of the Turkish Armed Forces from 1950 to 1954

Mehmet Nuri Yamut
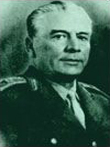

6th Chief of the Turkish General Staff
- In office 5 June 1950 – 10 June 1954
- President: Celâl Bayar
- Preceded by: Nafiz Gürman
- Succeeded by: Nurettin Baransel

Personal details
- Born: 1890 Darat Izza, Aleppo Vilayet, Ottoman Empire
- Died: 5 June 1961 (aged 70–71) Istanbul, Turkey
- Education: Turkish Military Academy

Military service
- Allegiance: Ottoman Empire (1908–1920); Turkey (1920–1954)
- Branch/service: (Ottoman Empire) Ottoman Army; Turkish Land Forces
- Rank: General
- Battles/wars: Balkan Wars; War of Independence; Battle of Gallipoli; Korean War

Mehmet Nuri Yamut Pasha (1890 – 5 June 1961) was a Turkish general, who became the 20th Commander of the Turkish Armed Forces on 5 June 1950. He was a career Artillery officer. In 1943 he was appointed to the 2nd Corps Command in Gallipoli campaign. During the 2nd Corps Command, he sold his house for the Turkish soldiers who were killed in the Battle of Gallipoli, and built a monumental grave. He served as Chief of General Staff between 1950 and 1954 for a four-year period. It is the first commander-in-chief of the Turkish Land Forces Command since the transition from the Ottoman army to the modern-regular army. He then retired and entered the Parliament from the Justice Party. TBMM X. and XI. term. He is a deputy in Istanbul.

After the 1960 Turkish coup d'état, the then-Commander of Turkish Armed Forces Rüştü Erdelhun was assaulted by putschist officers while the hero of the Turkish War of Independence, Ali Fuat Cebesoy and Korean War veteran Tahsin Yazıcı and former Commander Mehmet Nuri Yamut were arrested and imprisoned. While he was a deputy, he was arrested after the coup. He then died in June 1961 during the Yassıada trials.

Military offices
| Preceded by Nafiz Gürman | Chief of the General Staff of Turkey; 5 June 1950 - – 10 June 1954 | Succeeded by Nurettin Baransel |
| Preceded by - | Commander of the Turkish Army; 1 July 1949 - – 5 June 1950 | Succeeded by Kurtcebe Noyan |
| Preceded by Salih Omurtak | Commander of the First Army of Turkey; 9 August 1946 - – 1 July 1949 | Succeeded by Asım Tınaztepe |
| Preceded by İshak Avni Akdağ | Commander of the Second Army of Turkey; 6 August 1945 - 9 August 1946 | Succeeded by Hakkı Akoğuz |
