= Faruk Gürler =

15th Chief of the General Staff of the Turkish Armed Forces from 1972 to 1973

15th Chief of the General Staff of Turkey
- In office 29 August 1972 – 6 March 1973
- President: Cevdet Sunay
- Preceded by: Memduh Tağmaç
- Succeeded by: Semih Sancar

Commander of the Turkish Army
- In office 28 August 1970 – 28 August 1972
- Preceded by: Nazmi Karakoç
- Succeeded by: Semih Sancar

Personal details
- Born: 1908 Üsküdar, Istanbul, Ottoman Empire
- Died: 23 August 1975 (aged 61–62) Istanbul, Turkey
- Spouse: Hatice Mürşide Gürler
- Children: 3
- Education: Kuleli Military High School
- Alma mater: Turkish Military Academy

Military service
- Allegiance: Turkey
- Branch/service: Turkish Land Forces
- Years of service: 1929–1973
- Rank: General
- Commands: Second Army; Turkish Land Forces

Ömer Faruk Gürler (1913 – 23 August 1975) was a Turkish general. He was the 15th Commander of the Turkish Army during the 1971 Turkish coup d'état, and then Chief of the General Staff of Turkey (1972–1973). He was the military's candidate in the 1973 Presidential Election, but lost to Fahri Korutürk chosen by the Grand National Assembly of Turkey.
