= Second Army (Turkey) =

- Active: November 1921-June 1923; October 1923-present
- Country: Turkey
- Type: Field Army
- Size: 120,000
- Part of: Turkish Army
- Garrison/HQ: Malatya
- Engagements: Operation Euphrates Shield; Operation Olive Branch; Operation Peace Spring

Commanders
- Current commander: General Levent Ergün
- Notable commanders: Yakup Şevki Subaşı (1921-1923); Ali Fuat Cebesoy (1923-1924); Fahrettin Altay (1924-1933); İzzettin Çalışlar (1933-1939); Abdurrahman Nafiz Gürman (1939-1944); İsmail Metin Temel (2016-2018)

The Second Army (Turkish: 2'nci Ordu Komutanlığı) of the Turkish Army has headquarters in Malatya. It protects Anatolia and it patrols the border with Syria, Iraq and Iran. From 1911 Ottoman and Turkish corps are referred to in TGS literature in Arabic (1st, rather than Roman "I") numerals. An arbitrary date of 1945 has been chosen as the point at which to start referring to corps in Arabic numerals.

== History ==
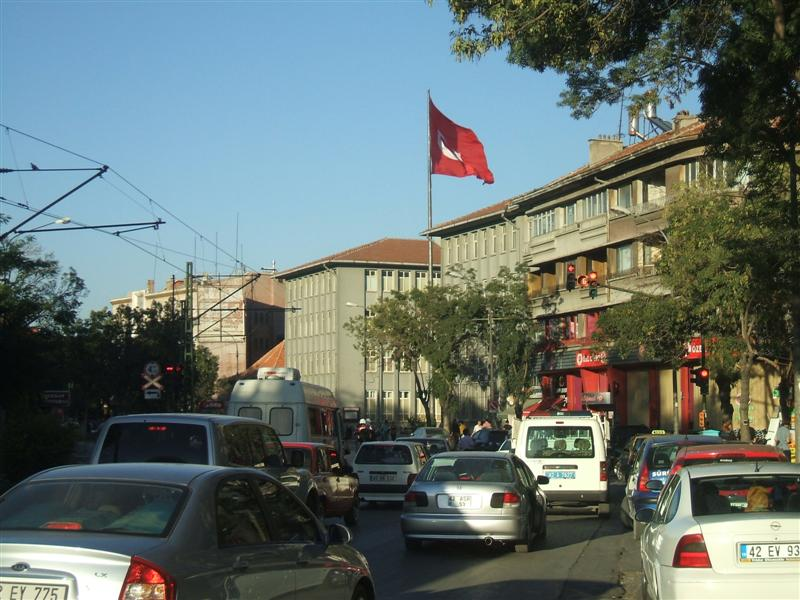
Destroyed old headquarters building, Konya

The former headquarters of the 2nd Army, which was transferred from Konya to Malatya in 1983, was in Konya.

== Formations ==
=== Order of battle, August 30, 1922 ===
On August 30, 1922, the Second Army was organized as follows:

Second Army HG (Commander: Yakup Şevki Subaşı, Chief of Staff: Hüseyin Hüsnü Emir Erkilet)

- 3rd Corps (Şükrü Naili Gökberk)
  - 61st Infantry Division (Salih Omurtak)
  - 41st Infantry Division (Alâaddin Koval)
  - 1st Infantry Division (Abdurrahman Nafiz Gürman)
- 6th Corps (Kâzım İnanç)
  - 17th Infantry Division (Nurettin Özsü)
  - 16th Infantry Division (Aşir Atlı)

=== Order of Battle, 1941 ===
In June 1941, the Second Army was organized as follows:

Second Army HQ (Balıkesir, Commander: Abdurrahman Nafiz Gürman)

- Dardanelles and Marmara
  - 2nd Corps (Gelibolu)
  - Demirkapı Fortified Area Command
  - 1st Corps (Çanakkale)
    - 16th and 57th Divisions
  - Dardanelles Fortified Area Command
  - 5th Corps (Bursa)
- Aegean and Mediterranean coasts
  - 12th Corps (İzmir)
  - İzmir Fortified Area Command

Bilgu reports the 1st Corps in 1947 to have comprised the 7th, 16th, and 57th Divisions.

=== The 1970s and operation of Cyprus ===
From August 1970 to August 1972 Semih Sancar commanded 2nd Army Command.

The ground forces detailed for the operation were put under the command of the 6th Corps/Second Army. They included the "Cakmak Special Strike Force", a brigade-level unit which would conduct the amphibious landing, the Commando Brigade, the Parachute Brigade, the 39th Infantry Division, the 28th motorised infantry division and elements of the 5th Armoured Brigade and the Jandarma. About 6,000 Turkish Cypriot fighters were stationed inside the Gönyeli enclave.

=== Order of Battle, 2010 ===
Şükrü Sarıışık commanded 2004-06. From 30 August 2006 - 30 August 2008 General Hasan Iğsız commanded 2nd Army. General Necdet Özel commanded the army in 2008-2010.

Estimated order of battle includes:

- 6th Corps (Adana)
  - 5th Armoured Brigade (Gaziantep) - units despatched to Turkish border August 17, 2012, as the Syrian Civil War gained pace.
  - 39th Mechanized Infantry Brigade (İskenderun)
  - 106th Artillery Regiment (İslahiye)
- 7th Corps (Diyarbakır)
  - 3rd Infantry Division (Turkey) (Yüksekova)
  - 16th Mechanized Brigade (Diyarbakır)
  - 20th Armoured Brigade (Şanlıurfa) - units despatched to Turkish border August 17, 2012, during Syrian uprising. Brigade referred to as a Mechanized Brigade up until roughly 2007-08; by the beginning of the dispatch of units to the border in August 2012, it was being referred to as an Armoured Brigade.
  - 70th Mechanized Infantry Brigade (Mardin)
  - 172nd Armoured Brigade (Silopi) The brigade dates back to at least 1971 when it was at Gaziantep. Previously part of the 15th Infantry Division as the 172nd Infantry Regiment in the Samsun area during the Second World War.
  - 2nd Motorized Infantry Brigade (Lice)
  - 6th Motorized Infantry Brigade (Akçay)
  - 3rd Commando Brigade (Siirt)
  - 107th Artillery Regiment (Siverek)

== Reported order of battle, 2012, during Syrian uprising ==
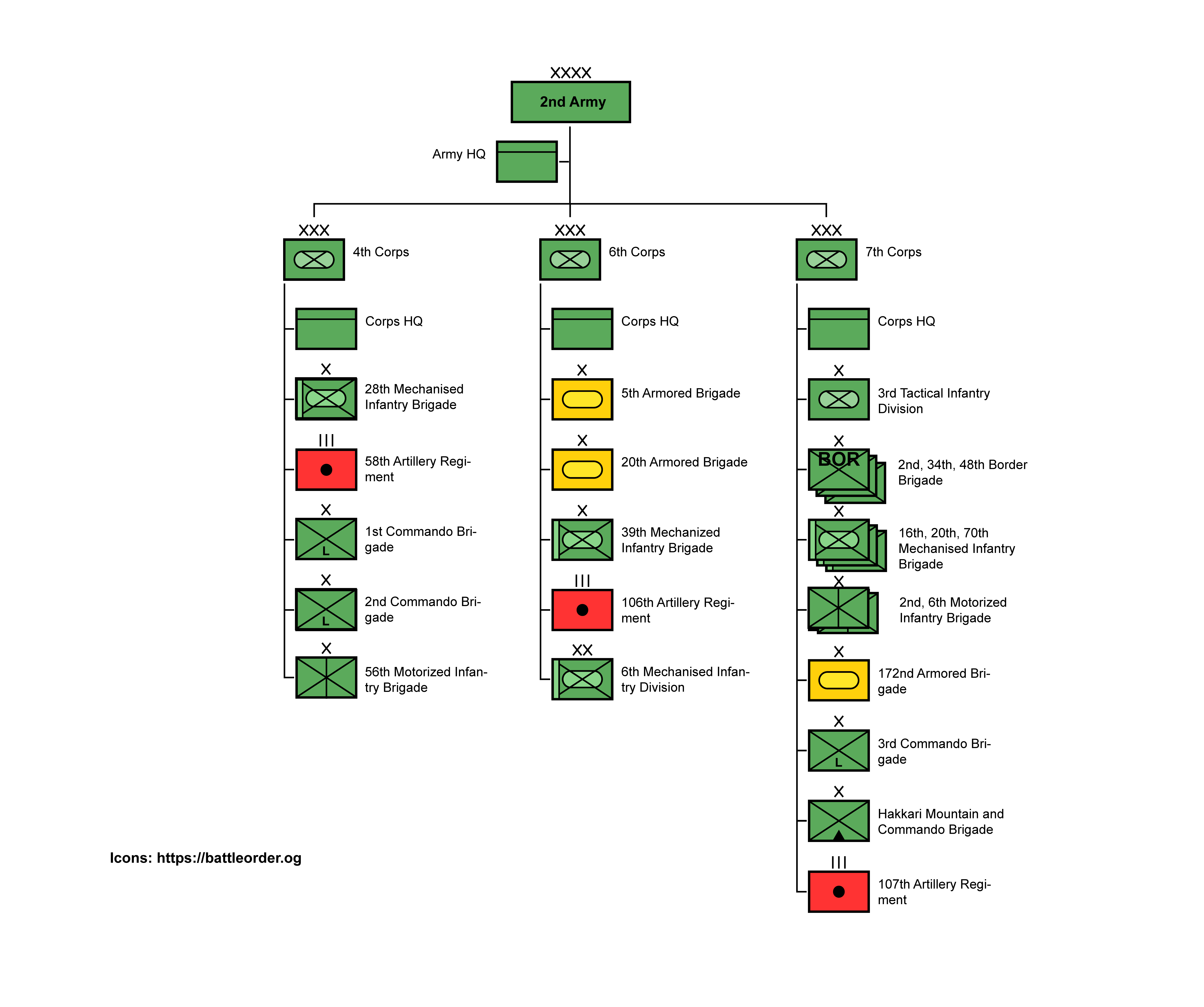
Structure of 2nd Army

The 2nd Army Command, headquartered in Malatya, has the second-highest number of troops after the Istanbul-based 1st Army Command, comprising roughly 100,000 soldiers. It is under the control of the Commander of the Land Forces, and includes these affiliated units:

- 4th Corps (Ankara)
- 6th Corps (Adana)
- 7th Corps (Diyarbakır)
- 3rd Tactical Infantry Division (Yüksekova)
- 28th Mechanized Infantry Brigade (Mamak)
- 58th Artillery Brigade (Polatlı)
- 1st Commando Brigade (Talas)
- 2nd Commando Brigade (Bolu)
- 5th Armored Brigade (Gaziantep)
- 39th Mechanized Infantry Brigade (İskenderun)
- 106th Artillery Regiment (İslahiye)
- 34th Border Brigade (Şemdinli)
- 16th Mechanized Brigade (Diyarbakır)
- 20th Armored Brigade (Şanlıurfa)
- 70th Mechanized Infantry Brigade (Mardin)
- 172nd Armored Brigade (Silopi)
- 2nd Motorized Infantry Brigade (Lice)
- 6th Motorized Infantry Brigade (Akçay)
- 3rd Commando Brigade (Siirt)
- 107th Artillery Regiment (Siverek)

== See also ==
- List of Commanders of the Second Army of Turkey
