= Fevzi Türkeri =

Turkish general

Fevzi Türkeri (born 1941, Elazığ) is a former Turkish general. He graduated from the Turkish Military Academy in 1962 and the Kara Harp Akademisi in 1975. During the 1980s and 1990s he was twice Chief of the Special Forces of the Turkish Army. He was General Commander of the Gendarmerie of Turkey from 26 August 2004 to 24 August 2006.

Military offices
Preceded by Kemal Yılmaz	Commander of the Turkish Special Forces; 1994 - 1996	Succeeded by Engin Alan
