= Kemal Yamak =

Commander of the Turkish Army
- In office 24 July 1987 – 1 September 1989
- Preceded by: Necip Torumtay
- Succeeded by: Doğan Güreş

Personal details
- Born: 1924 Merzifon, Turkey
- Died: 26 July 2009 (aged 84–85)

Military service
- Allegiance: Turkey
- Branch/service: Turkish Land Forces
- Years of service: 1945–1989
- Rank: General
- Unit: Infantry

Kemal Yamak (1924 – 26 July 2009) was Commander of the Turkish Army (1987–1989). He was previously head of the Special Warfare Department (1971–1974).

At the request of Yamak, General Semih Sancar, then the Chief of General Staff, asked Bülent Ecevit for a slush fund of 1 million dollars to support the Counter-Guerrilla programme. It was at that point Ecevit learned of its existence, and demanded a briefing.

In 2006, he published a book defending the role of the Special Warfare Department, and rejecting many allegations about its links with the "deep state".

== Books ==
- Gölgede kalan izler ve gölgeleşen bizler, Doğan Kitap, 2006
