= Sabri Yirmibeşoğlu =

Turkish general

Secretary-General of the National Security Council
- In office 22 August 1988 – 30 August 1990
- Preceded by: İrfan Tınaz
- Succeeded by: Nezihi Çakar

Personal details
- Born: 1 September 1928 Foça, İzmir Province, Turkey
- Died: 2 January 2016 (aged 87)

Military service
- Allegiance: Turkey
- Branch/service: Turkish Army
- Years of service: 1946–1991
- Rank: General

Süleyman Sabri Yirmibeşoğlu (1 September 1928 – 2 January 2016) was a Turkish general. He was Secretary-General of the National Security Council from 1988 to 1990.

== Career ==
Yirmibeşoğlu was first Chief of Staff, then Chief of the Turkish Armed Forces' Special Warfare Department (Özel Harp Dairesi) between 1974 and 1976 and commanded the special forces activities in Northern Cyprus in the eve and initial stages of the Turkish Operations in July and August 1974. In 2010, Yirmibeşoğlu reported to the television news channel Habertürk TV that Turkey burned a mosque during the Cyprus conflict in order to foster civil resistance against Greeks on the disputed island, and that their rules of war included "false flag" acts, engaging in acts of sabotage made to look as if they were carried out by the enemy.

During the 1970s, General Sabri Yirmibeşoğlu held various posts as; Chief of Intelligence, AFSOUTH-NATO, Naples, Italy, 1976–1978; Commander, 9th Division, 1978–1980, Sarıkamış; Chief of Logistics, Army Command, 1980–1982, Ankara; Deputy Secretary, Ministry of Defense, 1982, Ankara; 4th Corps and Martial Law Commander, 1983, Ankara.

As Martial Law Commander, the Mamak Military Detention and Penitentiary was also under his command. Upon his retirement in 1990, by Özal, a renowned Turkish journalist, Yavuz Donat, wrote the following, in his column "Vitrin":

"In the aftermath of September 12th (the military intervention of September 12th, 1980,) Sabri Pasha was the Martial Law Commander in Ankara. He used to tell me, 'People detained in Mamak are humans. I have to provide them with decent and humanely living conditions.' He was respectful to both the detainees and their families... He is now retired. Goodbye Sabri Pasha. We will not forget you."

His next post was, Chief of Operations, Turkish General Staff, 1984–1986, Ankara; followed by his promotion and appointment as Commander, 3rd Army, 1986–1988, Erzincan. General Sabri Yirmibeşoğlu's next and final post was General Secretary, National Security Council, 1988–1990, Ankara. Then he was forced into early-retirement by Turgut Özal.

In one of his latest and recently rarer interviews, by columnist Donat, in his column "Vitrin" he is asked, "Pasha, could this unit have acted illegally and made assassination plans against state officials..?" General Sabri Yirmibeşoğlu replies,

"Impossible... These allegations can't be true... This is execution without trial... This unit reports to the Deputy Chief of Staff. He in return reports directly to the Chief of Staff. If this unit has committed any crimes, have we all overlooked them? If we have, let's all be held accountable"

There are some claims that he may be linked to a 1988 assassination attempt against Turgut Özal.

General Sabri Yirmibeşoğlu wrote an autobiography.

== Istanbul Pogrom ==
Yirmibeşoğlu proudly reminisced about his involvement in the Istanbul Pogrom, calling it "a magnificent organization".
