= Hasan Iğsız =

Turkish general

Hasan Iğsız (born 1946, Istanbul, Turkey) is a retired General in the Turkish Army. He was Commander of the First Army of Turkey from 2009 to 2010. He was formerly a defendant in the Internet Memorandum trial, where he was tried together with Turkey's former Chief of Staff, İlker Başbuğ. Later this trial was merged into the controversial Ergenekon trials. Iğsız was subsequently acquitted in 2016. The Ergenekon trials targeted a very heterogeneous group of people, merged different trials into one, and mobilized conspiracies tainted with fabricated evidence in the struggle to dominate Turkey's institutions.

== Career ==
Iğsız graduated from the Turkish Military Academy in 1966 and from the Turkish Military College in 1976. He was promoted to Brigadier-General in 1993 and Major-General in 1997. He was promoted to General and appointed Commander of the 2nd Army in 2006 (30 August 2006 – 30 August 2008), and Deputy Chief of the General Staff (tr) in 2008. He was Commander of the First Army of Turkey from 2009 to 2010.

Iğsız was due to be appointed Commander of the Turkish Land Forces, but his appointment was blocked by launching the Internet Memorandum investigation, claiming that he was instrumental in launching websites to incite a military coup. Launched on the day of the military council deliberations with the President and the Prime Minister, the investigation was deployed to dismiss his appointment to the Land Forces.
