= Special Warfare Department =

Special forces of the Turkish army

- Active: 1952–1992
- Country: Turkey
- Branch: Turkish Army
- Type: Special forces
- Role: Special operations
- Engagements: Cypriot intercommunal violence Turkish invasion of Cyprus

The Special Warfare Department (SWD, Turkish: Özel Harp Dairesi (ÖHD)) was the special forces unit of the Turkish Army. Founded in 1952, it was formed out of the Army's Tactical Mobilisation Group (Turkish: Seferberlik Taktik Kurulu, STK). It was disbanded in 1992, with responsibility for special operations then taken over by the new Special Forces Command.

Former members include Korkut Eken.

== History ==
The SWD were also funded and trained by the USA. During the Cold War the SWD cooperated closely with the CIA.

The SWD encouraged and protected the Turkish Grey Wolves when they unleashed waves of bomb attacks and shootings that killed thousands of people, including students, lawyers, journalists, public officials, labor organizers, Kurds, and others, during the 1970s political violence.

The SWD established the TMT in Cyprus in 1958 to counter the EOKA and to force partition of the island, and supported it logistically and militarily. Arms were transferred from Turkey to support TMT, but when the arms transfer was blocked in international waters, the SWD contracted arms smugglers for the task. The SWD was also involved in the Turkish invasion of Cyprus in 1974, under the command of Sabri Yirmibeşoğlu. In 2010 Yirmibeşoğlu told television news channel Habertürk TV that Turkey burned a mosque during the Cypriot intercommunal violence in order to foster civil resistance against Greeks on the island, and that their tactics included false flag acts, engaging in acts of sabotage made to look as if they were carried out by the enemy.

== See also ==
- Counter-Guerrilla
- Operation Gladio
- List of commanders of the Special Forces of the Turkish Armed Forces
- Category:Special Warfare Department personnel
