= Yumurcak TV =

- Country: Turkey

Programming
- Language: Turkish
- Picture format: 4:3 (576i, SDTV)

Ownership
- Owner: Samanyolu Yayıncılık A.Ş.
- Sister channels: Samanyolu TV; Mehtap TV; Samanyolu Haber TV; Ebru TV; Xazar TV

History
- Launched: 25 June 2007; 18 years ago
- Closed: 19 July 2016; 9 years ago

Links
- Website: www.yumurcak.tv

Yumurcak TV was a Turkish Free-to-air Children television channel owned and operated by Samanyolu Yayıncılık A.Ş. Launched on 25 June 2007, it was closed and had its license revoked by the Radio and Television Supreme Council on 19 July 2016 due to alleged links with the Gülen Movement following the 2016 Turkish coup d'état attempt.
