= Raindrop Turkish House =

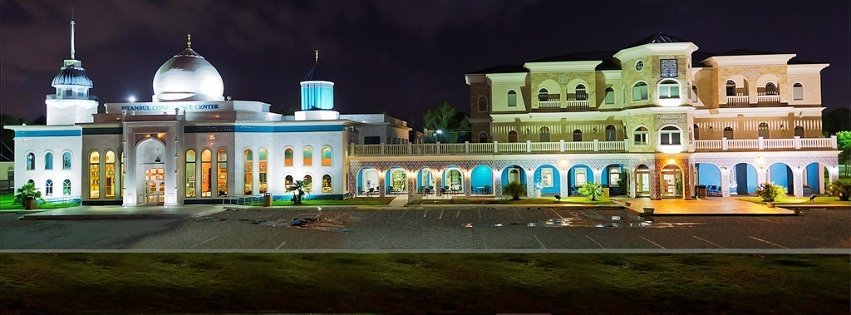
Raindrop Turkish House

Raindrop Turkish House (also known as Raindrop Türkevi or Raindrop Foundation) is a non-profit social and cultural organization founded by Turkish people in Houston, Texas in 2000. It operates in eight states: Texas, Arkansas, Kansas, Oklahoma, Mississippi, New Mexico, Tennessee, and Louisiana. The Raindrop Foundation aims to cultivate friendship and promote understanding of diverse cultures through its unique services to the community.

Raindrop strives "to establish bridges between the Turkic and American cultures and communities by providing easily accessible educational, social, and cultural services. Services are provided with the intention of contributing to global peace at the grassroots level by sharing Turkic countries' heritage of tolerance and understanding."

Raindrop organized intercultural trips to Turkey every year when it was safe to do so.

The Foundation is also linked to the Gülen movement.
