= International Festival of Language and Culture =

International youth language and culture festival

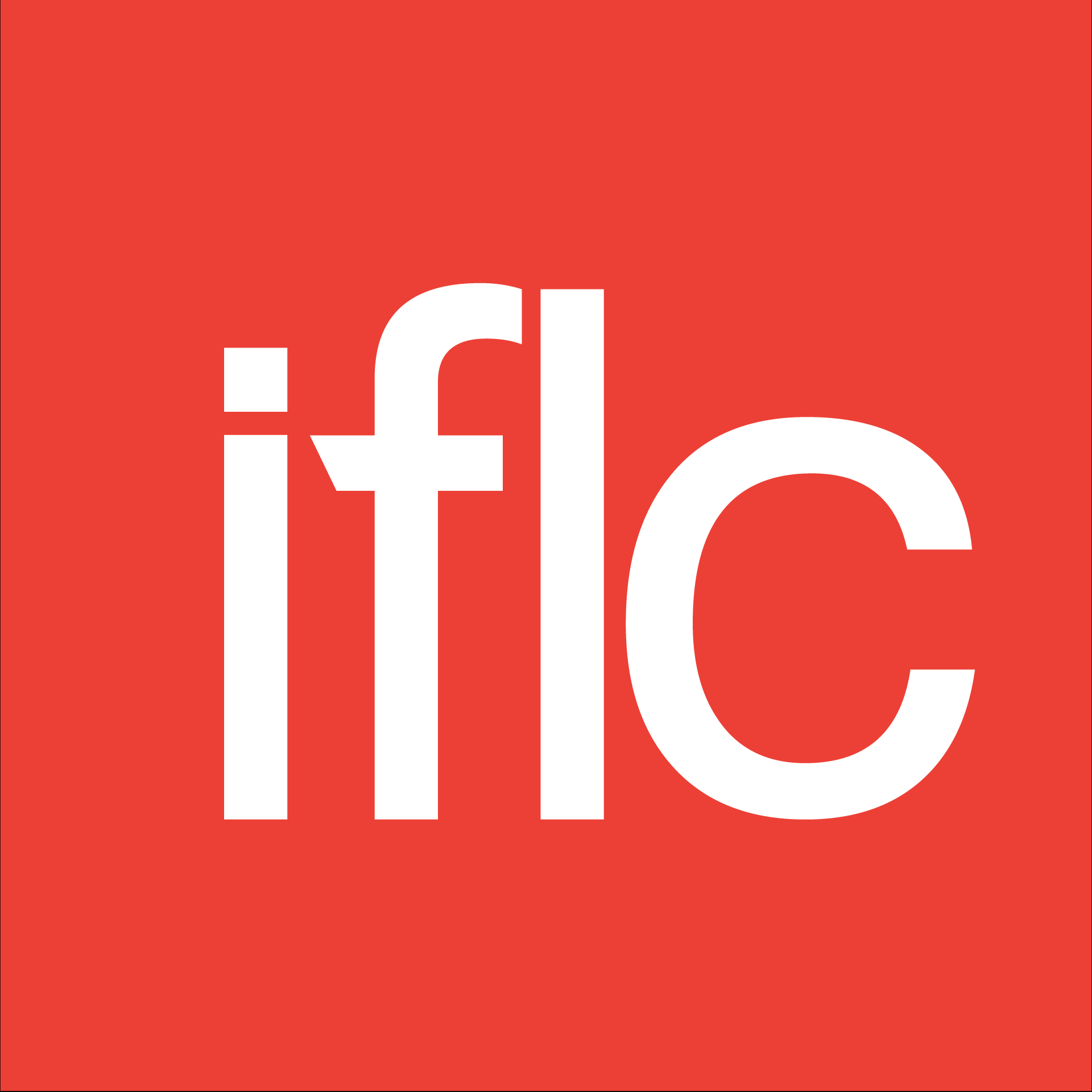
- International Festival of Language and Culture (IFLC)
- Status: Active
- Genre: Language and cultural festival
- Frequency: Annual / touring
- Location: Various international host cities
- Years active: 2003–present
- Organizer: International Festival of Language & Culture (IFLC)
- Filing status: Nonprofit
- Website: https://intflc.org

International Festival of Language and Culture (IFLC), known in Turkey as the Turkish Language Olympiads (Turkish: Türkçe Olimpiyatları), is an international youth performing arts festival. The programme brings together school choirs, dance ensembles, soloists and spoken-word performers from many countries to present music, dance, poetry and short theatrical pieces. The festival originated in 2003 and is associated with schools and institutions linked to the Gülen movement.

== Background ==
The competition was originally launched as a Turkish-language contest for students learning Turkish in schools associated with the Gülen movement, many of which offered Turkish as a foreign language alongside local curricula. Participants are typically selected through national or regional rounds before competing in categories such as grammar, oral skills, essay writing, poetry recitation, singing and theatre, culminating in an international gala event.

== History ==
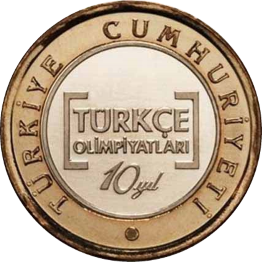
A commemorative 1 Turkish lira coin issued by the State Mint of Turkey in 2012 to mark the International Turkish Language Olympiads, reflecting the event's national significance

The first edition was held in 2003, with organiser records indicating participation from 17 countries and around 60 students. The event grew substantially over the following decade, expanding to participants from well over 100 countries.

In April 2016 the 14th edition of the festival, themed "Colors of the World", was held at the United Nations ECOSOC Chamber in New York City. Approximately 70 youth representatives from 27 countries performed songs, dances and cultural pieces. The event was co-organized by the Peace Islands Institute and the Journalists and Writers Foundation, and received a supportive message from United Nations Secretary-General Ban Ki-moon. It was aligned with the promotion of UN Sustainable Development Goal 16 on peaceful and inclusive societies.

A recording of the event is available on the United Nations Web TV.

Following the deterioration of relations between the Turkish government and the Gülen movement after 2013, the event had not helded in Turkey. After the 2016 Turkish coup d'état attempt, the festival's domestic activities in Turkey completely ended, however its operations continued mainly outside the country under the IFLC name.

== Format and participation ==
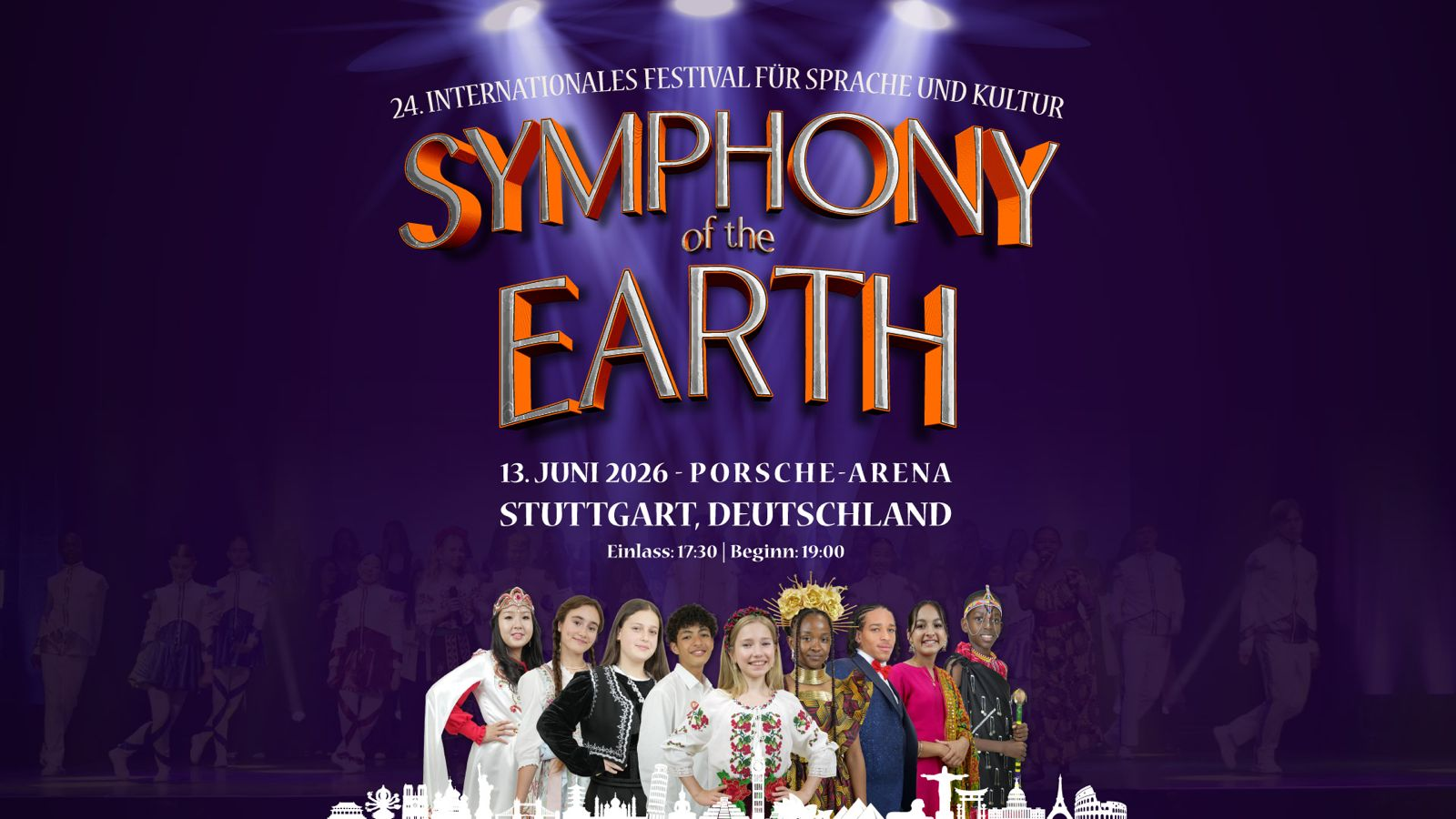
The official flyer for the IFLC 2026 final gala "Symphony of the Earth", held at Porsche Arena in Stuttgart, Germany

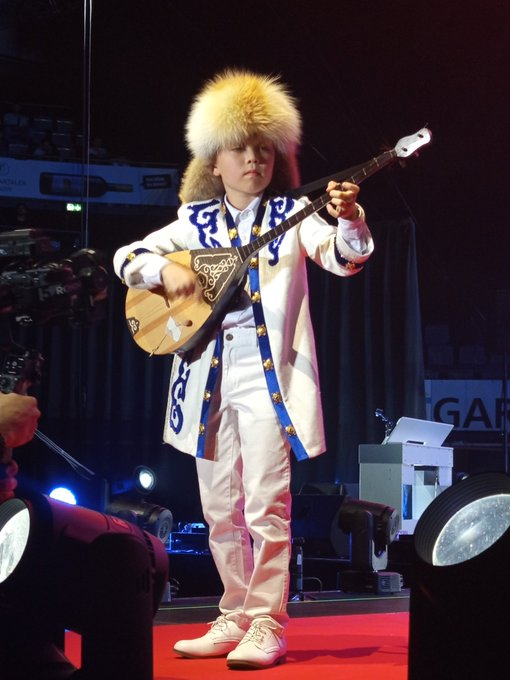
A young performer playing the dombra in traditional Kazakh clothing at an IFLC Festival

External videos
- "Symphony of the Earth"
- IFLC 2026 Final Gala – Live broadcast from Porsche Arena, Stuttgart, Germany

IFLC events typically culminate in a large gala show featuring performances from many countries, organised with the support of local host organisations and partner institutions.

== Organisation ==
IFLC events are organised through an international network of national chapters and partner organisations, with associated institutions publishing event schedules and past-event galleries.

Each year the festival adopts a different central theme.

== Selected editions ==
- 2003 (founding edition) – approximately 17 countries and 60 students.
- 2012 (10th edition) – Turkish press reported participation from around 135 countries and approximately 1,500 students for activities held in Turkey.
- 2013 – It is reported that at the 11th International Turkish Olympiads, helded 2,000 students from 140 countries and approximately with 5 million watchers.
- 2021 – Due to the COVID-19 pandemic, IFLC held the grand final of its international singing contest "Colors of Voices" online on 22 June 2021.
- 2022 (20th anniversary programming) – partner organisations reported a gathering described as involving participants from more than 160 nations for anniversary activities.
- 2025 – Events were held in more than 160 countries with over 560 celebrations marking the festival's 20th anniversary.
- 2026 – The final gala under the theme "Symphony of the Earth" was held on 13 June 2026 at Porsche Arena in Stuttgart, Germany.

== See also ==
- Gulen movement
- Gulen movement schools
- Fethullah Gulen
