= Grace of God (Turkish political rhetoric) =

Grace of God (Turkish political rhetoric) (Turkish: Allah'ın lütfu) is a theological concept that has been adopted by Turkish politicians and has become an important element in the country's political discourse after the 2016 Turkish coup d'état attempt. The term was introduced into modern political discourse through its use by Turkish President Recep Tayyip Erdoğan, who labeled the failed July 15 coup a "gift from God" or "the grace of God". The Turkish government utilized this narrative to transform the aftermath of the coup into a strategic opportunity for its own political interests, enabling the systematic removal and purging of members of the Gülen movement from their positions in the army, judiciary, and state bureaucracy. This particular blend of religious and political discourse has recently become an important aspect of academic discussion regarding populism in Turkey.
