= Nurettin Gazi Misirli =

Syrian-Turkish businessman

- Born: Gazwan Masri; August 1964 (age 61); Aleppo, Syria
- Occupations: Businessman, philanthropist
- Known for: Senior member of the Turkish business association MUSIAD

Nurettin Gazi Misirli (born Gazwan Masri, Aleppo, Syria 1964) is a Syrian-Turkish businessman. He was known for his dedication to serving the community and his experience in volunteer work.

His name emerged as an expert in Turkish affairs and a businessman working to build bridges of cooperation and communication to develop Arab Turkish political, cultural, commercial and economic relations through social work.

== Early life and education ==
Misirli left Syria in 1983 to become a student at Istanbul Technical University, Faculty of Business Administration Engineering. He is the son-in-law of Muharrem Karslı, the founding president of the Istanbul Stock Exchange and former AK Party deputy.

He participated in local and international qualifying and professional courses and also obtained a diploma in political science and a diploma in media and international relations from the Academy of International Relations in London and from Istanbul Sabahattin Zaim University.

== Career ==
He founded his tourism company in 1985 and the International Trade Company in 1987 while he was a university student, and then a number of companies to build the Central International Group.

Misirli became head of the Santral Group, which describes itself as “supplying products and goods from Turkish and international markets and marketing them in the Arab world”. The conglomerate also specializes in real estate.

In 2014, he founded a Turkish media website that speaks Arabic, directed at Arabs residing in Turkey and interested in Turkish affairs in the Arab world, to educate them about Turkish affairs, Arab-Turkish relations and everything that Arabs residing in Turkey need.

== Other positions ==
In 1997, he joined the largest non-governmental economic grouping in Turkey, the Independent Industrialists and Businessmen Association (MUSIAD).

He served in many positions in the association, including the position of Vice President General of the Association in charge of Foreign Relations, Vice President of the International Business Forum, Head of the Foreign Relations Office, Member of the Board of Directors, Chairman of the Exhibitions and Conferences Committee, Member of the Supreme Advisory Council, and Representative of the Presidency for Coordinating Relations in the Middle East and North Africa.

He participated in many local, international and official conferences as a speaker on the Turkish experience and for coordinating partnerships and joint investments in Turkey and the Arab world.

== Philanthropy ==
He used to give half of his time to business work and spend the other half on voluntary social work.

One of the founders of the Saudi Arabian School in Istanbul in 2000, which includes 400 male and female students from the Arab community.

Dar Al Salam Endowment was established in 1995 to have the family as the axis around which its activities revolve, the family, father, mother and children, to be a fertile field in which the giving seedlings of society grow, and to be a meeting club that brings together Arab families in the city of Istanbul, and provides them with the opportunity to meet, get to know each other and become brothers, the role that every community living in a large city needs, as Dar Al Salam was the cultural club and social center for the community’s members.

In 2011, he worked with the Turkish government to alleviate the suffering of Syrian refugees in camps, especially with regard to health, education, work and their integration into society.

He participated in establishing a number of voluntary work organizations in Turkey and the Arab world and worked with them as a consultant. His many and varied activities created for him a large network of international relations and an international communications network that facilitated the establishment of economic, commercial and cultural relations between Turkey, the Arab world and the countries of the world.

Dar Al Salam’s activities were aimed at consolidating civilizational, cultural and economic communication between the Arab and Western worlds and Turkey.

== Recognition ==
He received a number of local and international awards, certificates and shields for his contribution to attracting investments and partnerships and arranging business visits for many trade delegations and investors to and from Turkey and his contribution to establishing economic groups in the Islamic world and networking economic and commercial relations between economic institutions and businessmen.

His name appeared in Turkish, Arab and international media as news on Turkish-Arab affairs and as an economic analyst. In 2013, he was one of the participants in the main weekly program "From Istanbul" on the official Turkish channel "TRY Arabic".
