= Samanyolu Haber TV =

Samanyolu Haber Televizyonu (S Haber)
- Country: Turkey
- Broadcast area: Turkey and International
- Affiliates: Samanyolu Haber Radyo
- Headquarters: Çamlıca, Istanbul

Programming
- Language: Turkish
- Picture format: 16:9 (576i, SDTV)

Ownership
- Owner: Samanyolu Yayıncılık A.Ş.

History
- Launched: 22 January 2007; 18 years ago
- Closed: 30 April 2016; 9 years ago

Links
- Website: Samanyolu Haber

Samanyolu Haber TV was one of the Turkish national news channels broadcasting internationally. It was launched after expansion of Samanyolu TV network which included Mehtap TV (a culture oriented channel), Burc FM (a culture oriented radio channel), Yumurcak TV (a children's channel), and Dünya Radyo (an entertainment channel). The channel is known for its closeness to Fethullah Gülen, the leader of the Gülen movement. Samanyolu TV was an international TV station, with its headquarters in Istanbul. On 30 April 2016, its license was revoked and the channel closed by the Radio and Television Supreme Council due to alleged links with the Gülen Movement following the 2016 Turkish coup d'état attempt. It was also removed from Türksat. After this, Samanyolu Haber TV will not return along with Samanyolu TV until further notice.
