= Independent Industrialists and Businessmen Association =

- Müstakil Sanayici ve İşadamları Derneği
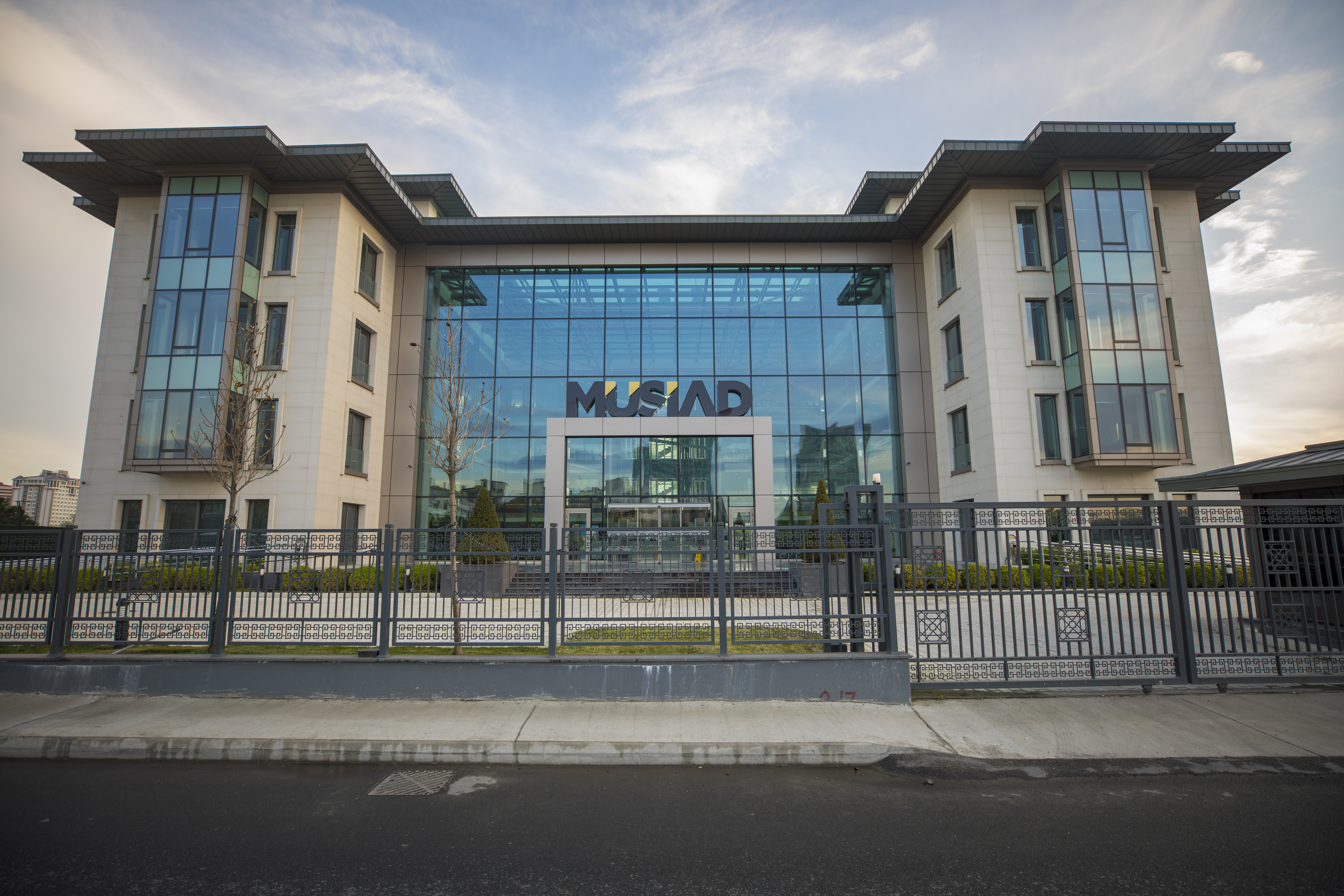
- MÜSİAD Headquarters in Istanbul
- Abbreviation: MÜSİAD
- Formation: May 9, 1990; 35 years ago
- Legal status: Association
- Purpose: To develop solidarity among the members and contribute to material and moral development of our country with this unity and solidarity spirit ensured within itself.
- Headquarters: Ataköy, Istanbul
- Secretary General: Mehmet Akif Altan
- President: Mahmut Asmalı
- Website: https://www.musiad.org.tr

Independent Industrialists and Businessmen Association (Turkish: Müstakil Sanayici ve İşadamları Derneği, MÜSİAD), is a non-governmental organization. According to 2021 records, MÜSİAD has 89 contact points in Turkey, 255 contact points in 73 countries, and more than 11,000 members.

The association holds an ISO 9001:2000 Quality Certificate. The association has representatives in every province of Turkey.

== Mission ==
The association was established with the goal of fostering a network of business leaders capable of promoting and enhancing economic development. Over the years, The Independent Industrialists and Businessmen Association has become an influential network supporting its members in Turkey and facilitating their involvement in global markets.

MÜSİAD organizes an annual defense industry fair called High-Tech Port by MÜSİAD. The second fair was held between 6–8 October 2015 in Doha, Qatar, and promoted billions of dollars of trade between Turkey and Qatar. MÜSİAD also supports Turkey’s Housing Developers and Investors Organization (KONUTDER) exhibitions to increase real estate trade ties to investors from the Gulf.

== Major initiatives ==
=== High-Tech Port by MÜSİAD ===
One of the key initiatives of the association is organizing an annual defense industry fair known as High-Tech Port by The Independent Industrialists and Businessmen Association. This event showcases advanced technologies and promotes defense-related trade. Notably, the second fair took place from October 6-8, 2015, in Doha, Qatar, significantly enhancing trade between Turkey and Qatar and underscoring the association's role in the global defense industry.

=== Support for KONUTDER ===
Furthering its sectoral engagement, the association also supports the Turkey’s Housing Developers and Investors Organization (KONUTDER) by participating in real estate exhibitions aimed at strengthening real estate trade ties with investors from the Gulf region. This support highlights the association's strategic efforts to foster international investment relations.

== See also ==
- Turkish Industrialists and Businessmen Association (TÜSİAD)
- Turkish Confederation of Businessmen and Industrialists (TUSKON)
