= Mehtap TV =

- Country: Turkey
- Headquarters: Istanbul

Programming
- Language: Turkish
- Picture format: 4:3 (576i, SDTV)

History
- Launched: 19 June 2006
- Closed: 26 July 2016; 9 years ago

Links
- Website: https://www.mehtap.tv/

Mehtap TV was a channel that began broadcasting on 19 June 2006 via the Turksat 2-A satellite. Murat Keskin was the executive editor of Mehtap TV. On 19 July 2016, its license was revoked and the channel closed by the Radio and Television Supreme Council due to alleged links with the Gülen Movement following the 2016 Turkish coup d'état attempt. The channel is known for its closeness to Fethullah Gülen, the leader of the Gülen movement.
