= Love Is a Verb =

- Film poster
- Directed by: Terry Spencer Hesser
- Produced by: Terry Spencer Hesser
- Starring: Fethullah Gülen
- Narrated by: Ashley Judd
- Cinematography: Stephan Mazurek
- Edited by: Jan Sutcliffe
- Release date: 2014
- Language: English

Love Is a Verb is a 2014 documentary film directed by Terry Spencer Hesser and narrated by Ashley Judd. The documentary focuses on the Fethullah Gülen and the Gülen movement.

Terry Spencer Hesser is a published author. She has written two fiction novels, Kissing Doorknobs (1998) and I Am a Teamster: A Short, Fiery Story of Regina V. Polk, Her Hats, Her Pets, Sweet Love, and the Modern-Day Labor Movement(2008).
