= Ali Fuat Yılmazer =

- Born: January 20, 1967 (age 59); Adapazarı, Sakarya, Turkey
- Citizenship: Turkey
- Education: Police College, Police Academy
- Occupation: Police chief
- Known for: Intelligence operations and the 17 December corruption investigation
- Office: Head of the Intelligence Branch, Istanbul Police Department
- Term: 2011–2014

Ali Fuat Yılmazer (born 20 January 1967) is a Turkish former police officer who served as head of the Intelligence Branch of the Istanbul Police Department. He previously held senior positions within the Turkish National Police's intelligence division and later became a defendant in several high-profile criminal proceedings, including the trials related to the murder of journalist Hrant Dink.

== Early life and education ==
Yılmazer was born in Adapazarı, Sakarya Province, on 20 January 1967. He graduated from Çukurova University in 1988 with a degree in foreign language education. In 1989, he completed his studies at the Police Academy, specializing in security sciences. He later earned a master's degree in sociology from Harran University.

== Career ==
After joining the Turkish National Police, Yılmazer worked in intelligence units for many years. He became head of Section C within the Police Intelligence Department before later serving as head of the Istanbul Police Intelligence Branch.

During his tenure, he was involved in counterterrorism and intelligence operations and became one of the most prominent intelligence officials in Turkey. His name was later associated with investigations such as Ergenekon and Balyoz, cases that subsequently became the subject of extensive political and judicial controversy.

In 2011, following the OdaTV investigation, he was reassigned from his intelligence post to an administrative position.

== Political activity ==
Yılmazer ran as an independent candidate for the Grand National Assembly of Turkey in Istanbul's first electoral district during the June 2015 general election, but was not elected.

== Criminal proceedings ==
In July 2014, Yılmazer was arrested as part of an investigation into allegations of unlawful wiretapping and was placed in pre-trial detention at Silivri Prison.

He was subsequently prosecuted in multiple cases concerning alleged misconduct by members of the Gülen movement within the police and judiciary. Prosecutors accused him of offenses including membership of an armed organization, forgery of official documents, and false denunciation in separate indictments.

Yılmazer was also tried in the retrial concerning the assassination of Armenian-Turkish journalist Hrant Dink. Prosecutors alleged that senior intelligence officials had prior knowledge of the assassination plot and failed to prevent the murder.

On 26 March 2021, the Istanbul 14th Heavy Penal Court convicted Yılmazer of premeditated murder in the Hrant Dink case and sentenced him to aggravated life imprisonment. He also received an additional sentence of four years and six months for destroying an official document.

== Personal life ==
Yılmazer is married and has four children.

External videos
- Ali Fuat Yılmazer's first interview regarding the allegations. (YouTube)

External videos
- Ali Fuat Yılmazer's second interview regarding the allegations (YouTube)

External videos
- Ali Fuat Yılmazer's third interview regarding the allegations. (YouTube)
