= Turkish Businessmen and Industrialists Confederation =

Turkish Confederation of Businessmen and Industrialists (TUSKON)
- Formation: 2005
- Dissolved: 27 July 2016
- Type: Union of employers
- Headquarters: Şişli, Istanbul
- Location: Turkey
- Leader: Rızanur Meral
- Website: www.tuskon.org

The Turkish Confederation of Businessmen and Industrialists (Turkish: Türkiye İşadamları ve Sanayiciler Konfederasyonu), best known by the abbreviation TUSKON, was an employers' organization in Turkey, with about 40,000 members. It was founded in 2005 by seven business federations. Ninety percent of the TUSKON members were small or medium establishments with fewer than 50 employees. TUSKON engaged in lobbying all decision-makers at the local, regional, national and global levels. Rızanur Meral, the managing director of SANKO Automotive Group, was the last president of TUSKON.

TUSKON was closely connected to the Islamic Gülen movement of the Turkish preacher Fethullah Gülen. The movement controlled many businesses and organizations around the world, with many of their leaders having membership in TUSKON, such as Bank Asya. TUSKON was closed following the coup attempt in July 2016.

== See also ==
- Turkish Industry and Business Association (TÜSİAD)
- Gülen movement
- Bank Asya
