= Kestanepazarı Mosque =

Mosque in İzmir, Turkey

Coordinates: 38.4199°N 27.1347°E

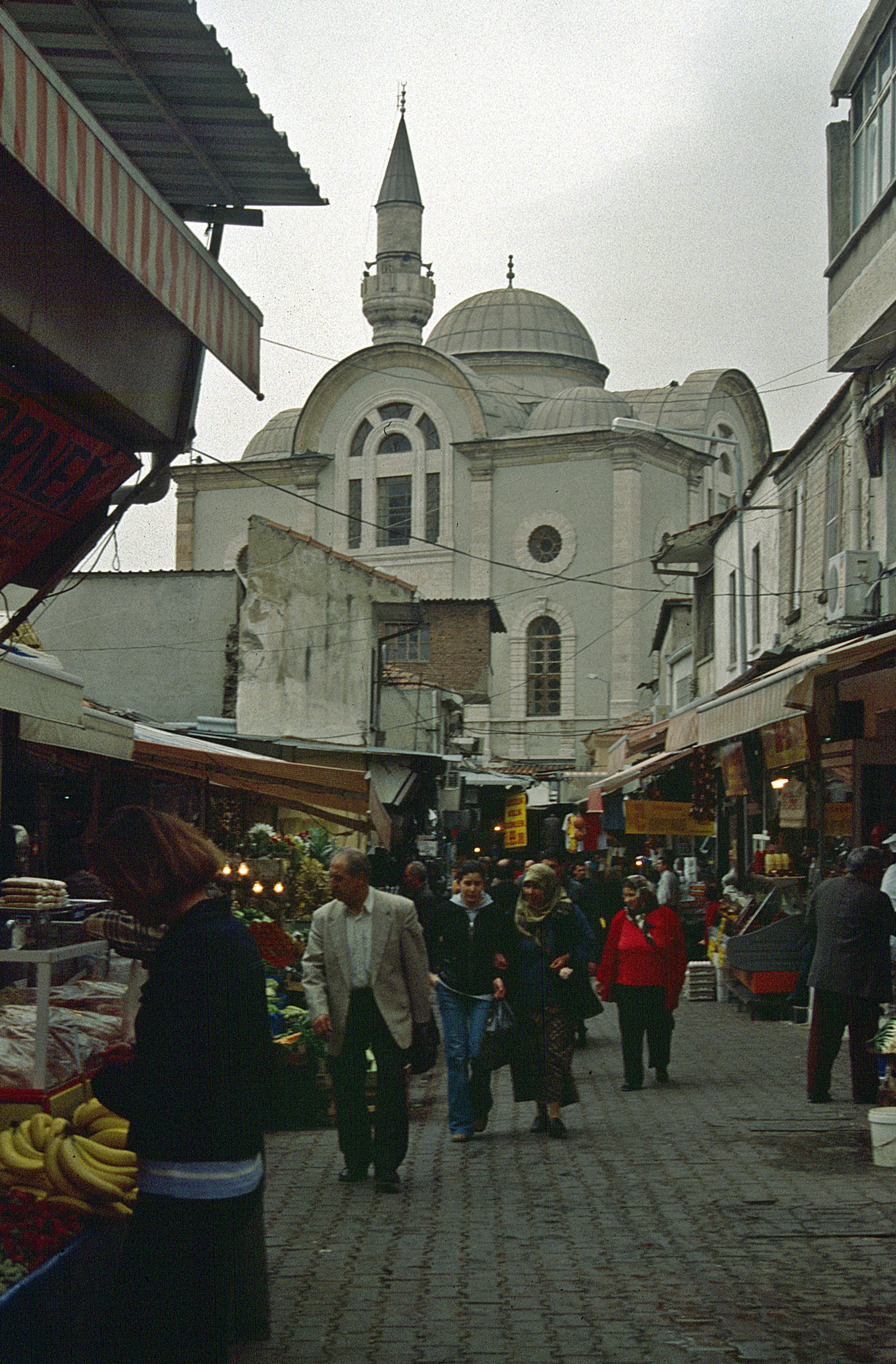

Religion
- Affiliation: Islam

Location
- Location: Ahmetağa, Konak, İzmir, Turkey
- Interactive map of Kestanepazarı Mosque

Architecture
- Type: Mosque
- Established: 1668

The Kestanepazarı Mosque (Turkish: Kestanepazarı Camii; meaning "Chestnut Market Mosque") is a historical Mosque in İzmir, Turkey.

An inscription on the Mosque recorded by the traveler Evliya Çelebi, stated that it was constructed by Ahmet Ağa in 1078 according to the Islamic calendar (circa 1668 CE). The Mosque was expanded by Eminzade Ahmet Ağa and reached its present-day appearance in the 19th century.

== Architecture ==
The stone and marble mosque has two levels. It is set on a square plan and has one large main dome in the centre with four smaller domes at the four corners of its top. Between the four smaller domes, there are half domes which form semicircular crests with the edge walls. Its mihrab was brought from the İsa Bey Mosque in Selçuk. It has a panel which is decorated with Koranic verses and gilded flower patterns. Located in the northwest corner of the mosque, the minaret is built entirely of cut stone.

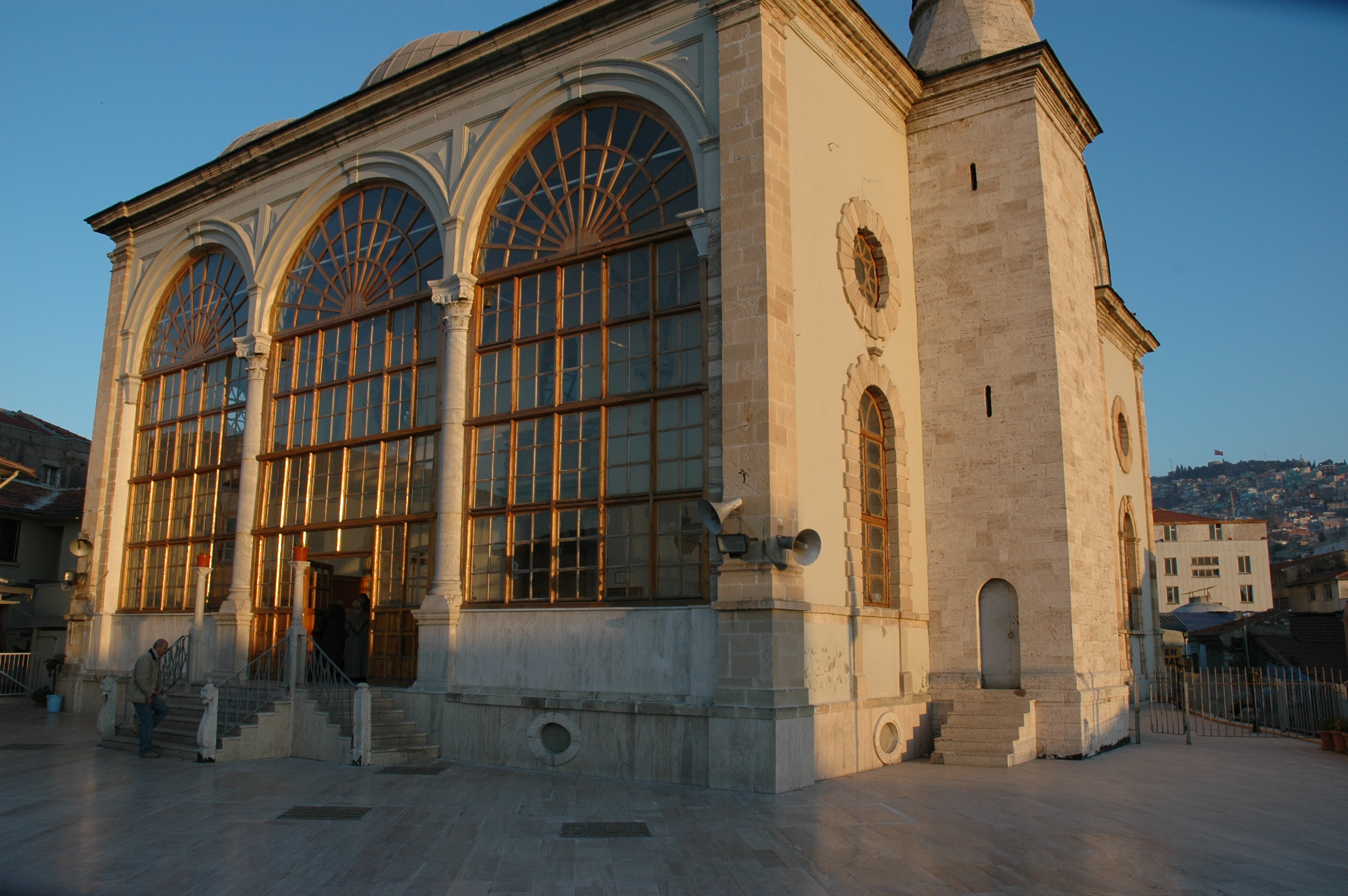
Kestanepazarı Camii (Chestnut market's mosque)
