= Fethullah Gülen =

Turkish scholar, theologian and dissident (1941–2024)

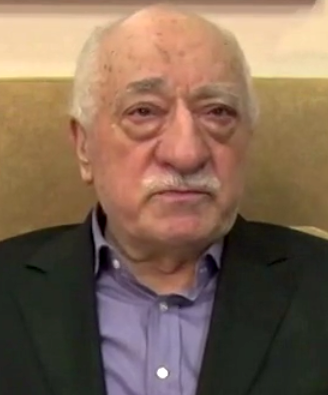
- Gülen in 2016
- Born: Muhammed Fethullah Gülen; 27 April 1941; Pasinler, Erzurum, Turkey
- Died: 20 October 2024 (aged 83); Pennsylvania, U.S.
- Resting place: Saylorsburg, Pennsylvania, U.S.
- Occupations: Scholar; author; preacher
- Known for: Gülen movement

Philosophical work
- School: Hanafi
- Main interests: Islamic thought; Moderate Anatolian Sufism
- Writing career
- Subjects: Moderate Islam; Turkish politics; Anti-communism; Neo-Ottomanism; Universal education; Interfaith dialogue among people of the Book (Ahl al-kitab) and by extension all peoples; Peace-building
- Notable work: The Essentials of the Islamic Faith
- Notable awards: 2015 Gandhi King Ikeda Award for Peace
- Movement: Nurcu
- Website: fgulen.com

Muhammed Fethullah Gülen (27 April 1941 – 20 October 2024) was a Turkish Muslim scholar, preacher, and leader of the Gülen movement, which as of 2010 had 8-10 million of followers globally and had established a network of over 2,000 STEM focused schools in more than 150 countries. Gülen was an influential neo-Ottomanist, Anatolian panethnicist, Islamic poet, writer, social critic, and activist–dissident developing a Nursian theological perspective that embraces democratic modernity. Gülen was a local state imam from 1959 to 1981 and he was a citizen of Turkey until his denaturalization by the Turkish government in 2017. Over the years, Gülen became a centrist political figure in Turkey prior to his being there as a fugitive. From 21 March 1999 until his death on 20 October 2024, Gülen lived in self-exile in the United States near Saylorsburg, Pennsylvania. Gülen's body was buried inside the Chestnut Retreat Center in Pennsylvania, where he had been residing for the last 25 years. 15,000 attended his funeral in a stadium in New Jersey.

Gülen said his social criticisms are focused upon individuals' faith and morality and a lesser extent toward political ends, and self described as rejecting an Islamist political philosophy, advocating instead for full participation within professions, society, and political life by religious and secular individuals who profess high moral or ethical principles and who wholly support secular rule, within Muslim-majority countries and elsewhere. Gülen was described in the English-language media as an imam "who promoted a tolerant Islam which emphasises altruism, hard work, and education" and as "one of the world's most important Muslim figures". He encouraged his followers to establish secular schools, charities, interest-free banks, and organizations across all areas of society. In 2016, when Erdoğan government began openly targeting the movement, they seized assets worth over $12 billion, including 1,043 private schools, 1,229 charities and foundations, 19 trade unions, 15 universities, and 35 medical institutions linked to the movement. Total number of schools opened by Gulen followers globally exceeded 2000 by the same year.

In 2003, a number of Gülen movement participants allied with Recep Tayyip Erdoğan's right wing Justice and Development Party (AKP), providing the AKP political and sorely-needed administrative support. According to some research, the cooperation between AKP and the Gulen movement was a shallow, tactical alliance that got stronger in 2007 due to perceived threats of a coup, which both groups believed would harm their interests. This political alliance worked together to weaken left-of-center Kemalist factions, but fractured in 2011. In 2013 Gulen criticized Erdogan's harsh response to the Gezi Park protestors. Later in the year a major corruption scandal erupted which led to resignation of 4 ministers from Erdogan cabinet. Turkish prosecutors accused Gülen of attempts to overthrow the government by allegedly directing politically motivated corruption investigations by Gülen-linked investigators then in the judiciary, who wiretapped the executive office of the Turkish president . The leaked conversation between Erdogan and his son, which triggered the corruption scandal was viewed by 3 million people in 24 hours on YouTube. Erdogan later accused Gülen to be the mastermind of the 2016 Turkish coup attempt, Gülen denied the accusations, and called for an international commission to investigate it, saying he'd accept its findings if found guilty.

A Turkish criminal court issued an arrest warrant for Gülen in 2016, and Turkey demanded his extradition from the United States. U.S. government officials did not believe he was associated with any terrorist activity, and requested evidence to be provided by the Turkish government to substantiate the allegations in the warrant requesting extradition, frequently rejecting Turkish calls for his extradition.

Gülen was designated as a terrorist leader in Turkey and Pakistan, and some politically aligned organisations like the OIC and GCC. However, neither Gulen nor the Gulen movement is recognized as a terrorist organization by the European Union, the United States, the United Kingdom, Canada, Australia and New Zealand due to lack of credible evidence. Between 2016 and 2024 an estimated 3,000,000 citizens of Turkey were tried for terrorism charges and 511,000 arrested for alleged links to the Gülen movement.

== Biography ==
Muhammed Fethullah Gülen was born in the village of Korucuk, near Erzurum, to Ramiz and Refia Gülen, There is some dispute over his date of birth. According to some accounts, usually older ones, he was born on 10 November 1938, while others state his birth was on 27 April 1941. State documents support the 1941 date, which is now the accepted date, used on Gülen's English website. (Some commentators note that 10 November 1938 was the date of the death of the founder of modern Turkey, Mustafa Kemal Atatürk, and suggest that the date was chosen for its political significance. An alternative explanation for the discrepancy offered by one of Gülen's close students, and biographer, was that his parents waited three years to register his birth.)

Gülen's father was an imam. His mother taught the Qur'an in their village, despite such informal religious instruction being banned by the Kemalist government. Gülen's secular formal education ended when his family moved to another village. He took part in Islamic education in some Erzurum madrasas and was influenced by the ideas of Kurdish scholar Said Nursi. He gave his first sermon as a licensed state preacher in 1958, when he was in his teens.

Gülen was appointed an assistant imam at Üç Şerefeli Mosque in Edirne, 6 August 1959, and thus joined in the Turkish civil service where he served until he retired from formal preaching duties in 1981.

While Gülen was teaching at the Kestanepazari Qur'anic School in İzmir in March 1971, the Turkish military seized control of the government in an attempt to quell domestic political violence. During its aftermath, Gülen was arrested for organizing a clandestine religious group based on his teachings and was imprisoned for seven months.

Gülen's influence in civil society and number of followers grew steadily during the 1980s and 1990s. From 1988 to 1991 he gave a series of sermons in popular mosques of major cities. He stressed importance of studying Science together with Islam, following Nursi's vision. He encouraged his followers to establish STEM-focused schools, forming a global educational network of 2,000 schools across 160 countries by 2014. In 1994, he helped found the Journalists and Writers Foundation, which started dialogue among Muslims, secularists, traditionalists, atheists, Christians, leftists and modernists to discuss and debate common positions on key contemporary issues. He was later given the title of honorary president by the foundation. He avoided getting involved in politics and reportedly avoided making any comments about the forced closures of the Islamist Welfare Party in 1998 or the Virtue Party in 2001, or meeting with the leaders of political Islamist parties, although he did meet with some other politicians from both the left and the right like Turgut Özal, Tansu Çiller, Bülent Ecevit.

=== Coming to the United States ===
In March 1999, Gülen relocated to the United States for medical treatment, and remained there until his death. According to the Kemalist Turkish law of the time, intending to ensure modernity and secularism, non-state sanctioned religious endeavors were outlawed and Gülen was under investigation for subverting the government, especially over remarks (aired after he immigrated to U.S.) which seemed to favor an Islamic state. In June 1999, after Gülen had left Turkey, videotapes were sent to some Turkish television stations with recordings of Gülen saying,

The existing system is still in power. Our friends who have positions in legislative and administrative bodies should learn its details and be vigilant all the time so that they can transform it and be more fruitful on behalf of Islam in order to carry out a nationwide restoration. However, they should wait until the conditions become more favorable. In other words, they should not come out too early.

Gülen was tried in absentia in 2000, and found guilty of conspiring to embed his supporters into the Turkish civil service in important governmental offices to overthrow the government. Gülen said his remarks were taken out of context, and his supporters raised questions about the authenticity of the tape, which he said had been "manipulated".

Gülen's conviction was reversed in 2008 under the new Justice and Development Party (AKP) government of Prime Minister Recep Tayyip Erdoğan, a move that signaled cooperation between Erdoğan's AKP (whose Islamist ideas were becoming increasingly popular), and Gülen's movement (whose media, banking and educational network in Turkey and elsewhere was becoming increasingly powerful).

Gülen applied for a "green card", i.e. permanent residence in the United States in 2002. After 11 September 2001, the U.S. increased its scrutiny of its domestic Islamic religious groups. Objecting to Gulen's residency application were the FBI, the State Department, and the Department of Homeland Security. Gülen first based his claim to residency on his being an alien of extraordinary ability as an education activist; the U.S. Citizenship and Immigration Services rejected it. Lawyers representing the Secretary of Homeland Security argued that Gülen has no degree or training in the field of education and questioned laudatory opinions about Gülen, cited by his lawyers, that had been expressed by scholars at academics conferences funded by Gulenist foundations. CIA National Intelligence Council former vice chairman Graham E. Fuller, former CIA official George Fidas and former US Ambassador to Turkey Morton Abramowitz wrote endorsement letters for Gülen's green card application in 2008. The court ruled against the USCIS and in Gülen's favor, granting Gülen his green card.

With the advent of Erdoğanist Turkey in the 2000s, structural impediments to Muslims' participation in civil life were gradually lifted. Many of those educated in institutions sponsored by participants in civil-society endeavors that Gülen had inspired ended up as members of the Turkey's judiciary, its governmental apparatus, and its military. While Gulen's movement had consistently maintained that it stayed above politics, in the 2011 election its print and broadcast media suddenly came out in support of Erdogan and his party, leading to another big AKP victory. In 2012, Erdoğan called on Gülen to return to Turkey, but Gülen did not take up the invitation. But as Turkey's secular state was dismantled, tension grew between Erdogan and Gulen beginning with Erdogan's closing down of Gulen's network of university prep schools.

In the period just prior to the 2016 Turkish coup d'état attempt, Erdoğanism changed in its perception of Gülenism from that of sometimes ally to a dangerous rival, attempting to construct a parallel state structure. On 19 December 2014, a Turkish court issued an arrest warrant for Gülen, accusing him of running an "armed terrorist group".

In a 2015 interview, Hikmet Çetinkaya—a veteran secularist journalist for Cumhuriyet newspaper and a long-time critic of Gülen—stated that he had been investigating the movement for 40 years and had faced 170 lawsuits filed by Gülen. However, he noted that he had never described Gülen or the movement as a terrorist organization and maintained that he would not do so, as he is someone to defend human rights, justice and democracy.

Before and after the attempted putsch, Gülenists became the greatest portion of those caught up in the massive 2016–present purges in Turkey. Since the 2016 coup attempt, authorities tried over 3 million Turkish citizens for terrorism charges, arrested at least 511,000, and shut down entire network of schools, universities, hospitals, charities, and businesses allegedly associated with the Gülen movement in Turkey.

=== Later life and death ===
Gülen had resided at the Hizmet movement-affiliated Chestnut Retreat Center, a 25-acre wooded estate in the Poconos (within Ross Township, Monroe County, Pennsylvania, near Saylorsburg). About thirty people used to live and work on the estate, owned by the Golden Generation Foundation. Never married, Gülen's own living quarters and study were within a pair of small rooms, whose rent he paid out of his publishing royalties and which contained a mattress on the floor, prayer mat, desk, bookshelves, and treadmill, within one of the estate's several structures, among which is a hall used as a mosque. Gülen was reported to be in ill health in his last years. In 2017, reports identified four candidates to succeed Gulen, if necessary, in leadership of the Hizmet movement: Mehmet Ali Şengül, Cevdet Türkyolu, Osman Şimşek and Ahmet Kurucan.

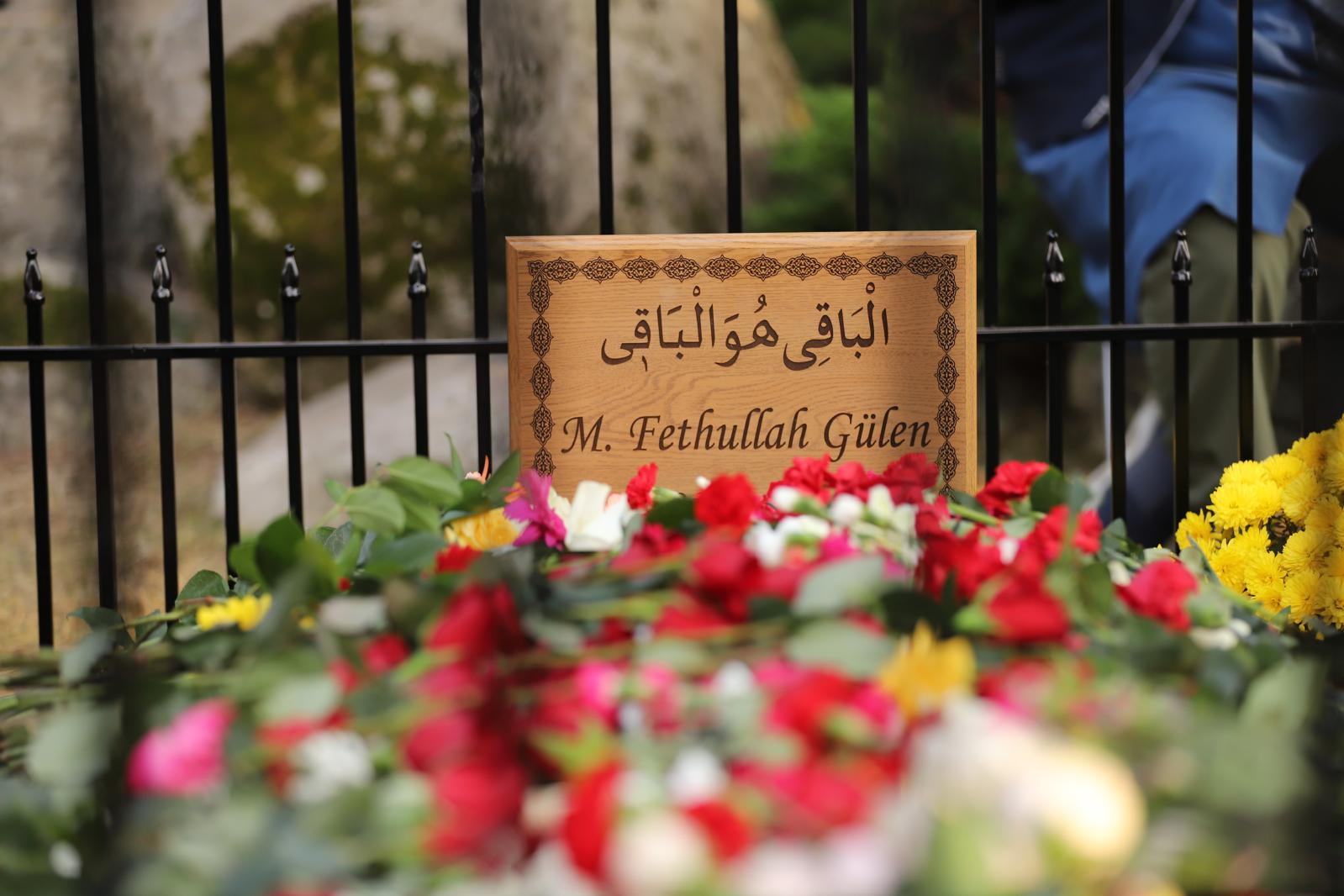
Gülen’s grave in the compound where he lived during the last 25 years of his life.

Gülen died at a hospital in Pennsylvania on 20 October 2024, at the age of 83. He was being treated for heart and kidney failure at the time of his death. Due to the political situation in Turkey, he was buried on the grounds of the Chestnut Retreat Center, contrary to his wish to be interred in İzmir. 15,000 attended his funeral held in a stadium in New Jersey on 24 October 2024. His funeral prayer was led by Suat Yildirim who was not considered as a successor of him. On 7 November 2024 Alliance for Shared Values, a NY based Hizmet movement non-profit stated its commitment to "consultative decision‑making, localisation, pluralism, and the continuation of its core values, including education, dialogue, and humanitarian aid".

Tushar Gandhi, great-grandson of Mahatma Gandhi posted on his X account: "Rest in peace Fehtullah Gulen in his exile from his beloved country. Another voice of peace muted, a great loss to humanity!"

Sam Brownback, former governor of Kansas and US senator expressed sorrow over the death of Gülen and stated that he and his followers were "wrongly branded as terrorists by the Turkish government", added "Civil liberties there have diminished for everyone. Respect for the rule of law must be restored".

Kazim Gulecyuz, editor-in-chief of the Turkish newspaper Yeni Asya, a newspaper owned by another Nur Movement, was arrested on charges of "terrorist propaganda" after sharing a condolence message on Twitter following Gülen’s death.

== Influence in Turkish society and politics ==
The Gülen movement, also known as Hizmet ('Service') or Cemaat (pronounced Jamaat and meaning 'Community'), has millions of followers, as well as many more abroad. Beyond the schools established by Gülen's followers, many Gülenists held positions of power in Turkey's police forces and judiciary. Turkish and foreign analysts believe Gülen also has sympathizers in the Turkish parliament and that his movement controlled the widely read Islamic conservative Zaman newspaper, over 1000 schools and 15 universities, the private Bank Asya bank, the Samanyolu TV television station, and many other media and business organizations, including the Turkish Confederation of Businessmen and Industrialists (TUSKON). All have been shut down following the coup attempt. In March 2011, the Turkish government arrested the investigative journalist Ahmet Şık and seized and banned his book The Imam's Army, the culmination of Şık's investigation into Gülen and the Gülen movement.

Gülen taught a Hanafi version of Islam, deriving from Sunni Muslim scholar Said Nursi's teachings. Gülen stated that he believes in science, interfaith dialogue among the People of the Book, and multi-party democracy. He initiated such dialogue with the Vatican and some Jewish organizations.

The Gülen movement's constituent local entities function independently from each other, existing, in the aggregate, as leaderless activist entities. "I really don't know 0.1% of the people in this movement", Gülen said. "I haven't done much. I have just spoken out on what I believe. Because it [Gülen's teachings] made sense, people grasped it themselves." "I opened one school to see if people liked it. So they created more schools." The movement includes some theological staff as imams or spiritual counselors, although their identities are kept confidential due to such positions being illegal in Turkey. This has led some observers to argue that the movement includes a clandestine aspect.

=== 1970s, 1980s and 1990s ===
Gülen opened an ışık evler or "light houses" (students' hostel offering scholarships for poorer scholars) in 1976, with there being informal sohbets (Quranic discussions) available there for the students as well. Gülen encouraged like-minded individuals to follow suit, which became the genesis of the Gülen movement.

During the political violence in Turkey between the right and left in the 1970s, Gülen "invited people to practice tolerance and forgiveness." Following the 1980 Turkish coup d'état, in which the military targeted communists, Gülen gave his "explicit assent" to the coup, saying:

I want to also add that the architects of the coup also took some positive administrative decisions. They shook society to renew itself once again. They defeated the Communist movement which recruited some misguided youth who wanted Turkey to be under Soviet influence. They intentionally or unintentionally prevented our country from entering into quagmire and into a long bloody struggle. Moreover, they gave opportunities to some decent children of our homeland to serve our nation.

Following the political violence of the preceding years, Gülen expected that the coup would reestablish stability and lead to a subsequent restoration of democracy. Gülen's assent to the coup later prompted criticism from Turkish liberals.

Despite Gülen's support for the coup, the military authorities issued an arrest warrant against him, which was revoked by a "state security court" in 1986.

In the 1980s and 1990s under Turgut Özal, Gülen and his movement benefited from social and political reforms, managing "to turn his traditional and geographically confined faith movement into a nationwide educational and cultural phenomenon" that "attempted to bring 'religious' perspectives into the public sphere on social and cultural issues."

In the 1980s, the movement launched its daily newspaper, Zaman and established STEM focused schools in Turkey.

The 1990s marked a period of rapid domestic and international growth for the Gülen movement. Domestically, Gülen affiliated schools gained prestige as their students secured Turkey’s first-ever medals at the International Science Olympiads; notably, Salih Adem’s historic gold in Physics earned him a cover feature in the prominent science magazine Bilim ve Teknik. During the same years the movement began its global expansion, establishing a network of international schools across Central Asia after the collapse of the Soviet Union and various parts of the world. This era also saw the movement diversify its influence by launching various media outlets like Samanyolu TV, Burc FM and founding financial institutions, notably Bank Asya.

The growth of the Gülen movement sparked opposition from both Kemalists, who perceived the movement as threatening to undermine secularism, and from more radical Islamists who viewed the movement as "accommodating" and "pro-American".

=== 2000s and 2010s ===
Sharing Turkish President Recep Tayyip Erdoğan's ambition to empower religious individuals in civil life previously disenfranchised in secular Turkey, in 2003 a number of Gülen movement participants pivoted from the Turkish political center to become the junior partner with the newly ruling Erdoğan-led and center-right Justice and Development Party (AKP), providing the party political and sorely-needed administrative support. This political alliance worked together to weaken left-of-center Kemalist factions in the judiciary, military, and police. It internally fractured in 2011, which became common knowledge by the time of the corruption investigations of highly placed members of Turkey's ruling party in 2013.

==== Ergenekon Trials ====
In 2005, a man affiliated with the Gülen movement approached U.S. Ambassador to Turkey Eric S. Edelman during a party in Istanbul and handed him an envelope containing a document supposedly detailing plans for an imminent coup against the government by the Turkish military. However, the documents were soon found to be forgeries. Gülen affiliates state that the movement is "civic" in nature and that it does not have political aspirations. However, he was accused of being the mastermind behind the Ergenekon trials by secularists, who see the trial's objective as weakening of Turkish military. Those who publicly said that the trial was a sham were subject to harassment by Zaman, some examples being Dani Rodrik and İlhan Cihaner.

==== Split with Erdoğan ====
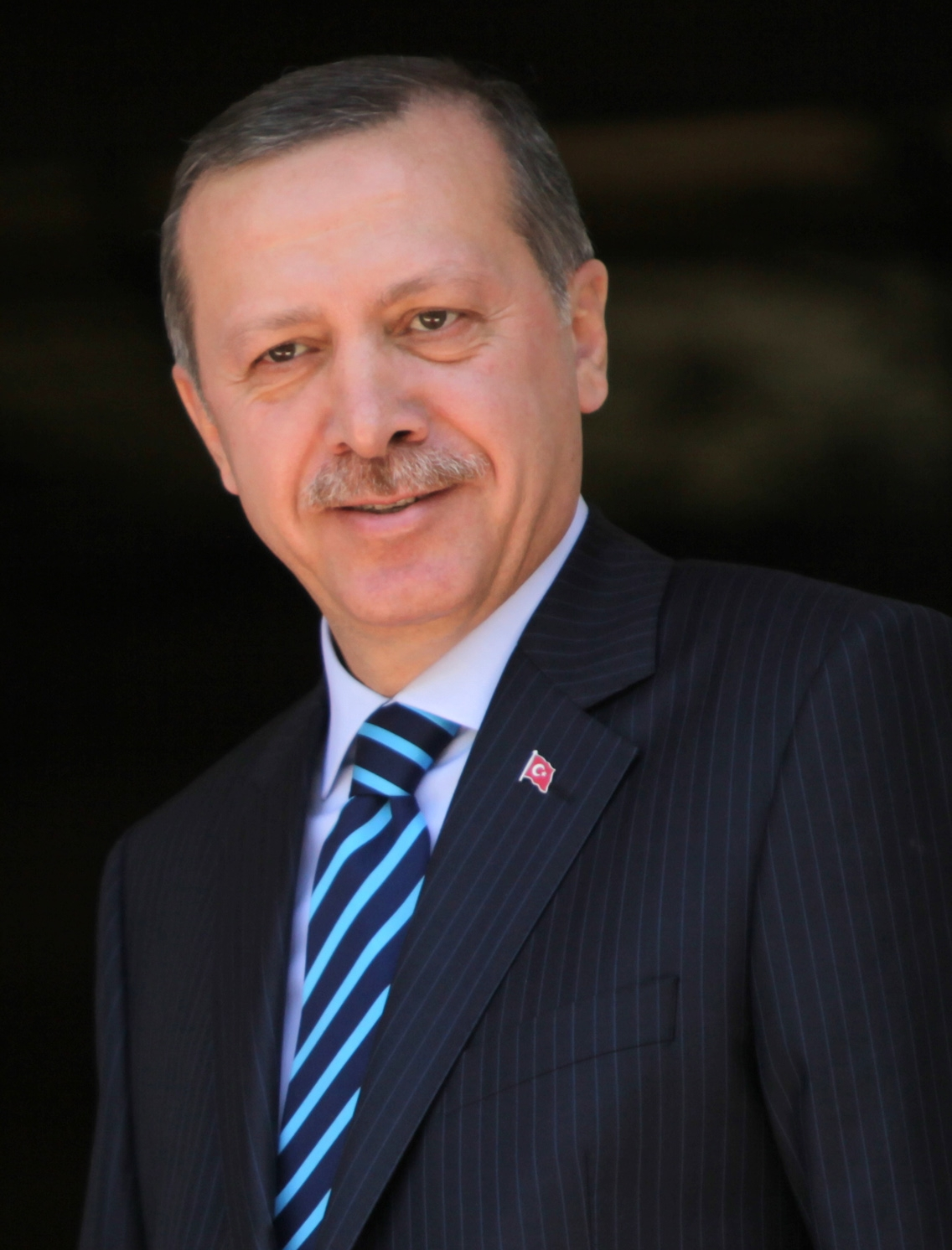
Erdoğan in 2010

Despite Gülen's and his followers' statements that the organization is non-political in nature, analysts believed that a number of corruption-related arrests made against allies of Erdoğan reflect a growing political power struggle between Gülen and Erdoğan. These arrests led to the 2013 corruption scandal in Turkey, which the ruling AKP's supporters (along with Erdoğan himself) and the opposition parties alike have said were choreographed by Gülen after Erdoğan's government came to the decision early in December 2013 to shut down many of his movement's private pre-university schools in Turkey. During this period, police officers leaked a phone conversation between Erdoğan and his son—in which Erdoğan instructed his son to hide large sums of money—triggering a major public uproar and drawing three million views on YouTube within 24 hours.

The Erdoğan government has said that the corruption investigation and comments by Gülen are the long term political agenda of Gülen's movement to infiltrate security, intelligence, and justice institutions of the Turkish state, a charge almost identical to the charges against Gülen by the Chief Prosecutor of Turkey in his trial in 2000 before Erdoğan's party had come into power. Gülen had previously been tried in absentia in 2000, and acquitted of these charges in 2008 under Erdoğan's AKP government.

In emailed comments to The Wall Street Journal in January 2014, Gülen said that "Turkish people... are upset that in the last two years democratic progress is now being reversed", but he denied being part of a plot to unseat the government. Later, in January 2014 in an interview with BBC World, Gülen said "If I were to say anything to people I may say people should vote for those who are respectful to democracy, rule of law, who get on well with people. Telling or encouraging people to vote for a party would be an insult to peoples' intellect. Everybody very clearly sees what is going on."

On 28 October 2015, Ministry of Interior placed Gülen in the red category of the "most wanted terrorists list". The Ministry announced that a monetary reward of up to 10 million Turkish liras will be given to Gülen in this category.

According to some commentators, Gülen is to Erdoğan what Trotsky was to Stalin. Ben Cohen of the Jewish News Syndicate wrote: "Rather like Leon Trotsky, the founder of the Soviet Red Army who was hounded and chased out of the USSR by Joseph Stalin, Gülen has become an all-encompassing explanation for the existential threats, as Erdogan perceives them, that are currently plaguing Turkey. Stalin saw the influence of 'Trotskyite counter-revolutionaries' everywhere, and brutally purged every element of the Soviet apparatus. Erdogan is now doing much the same with the 'Gülenist terrorists.'"

=== 2016 coup attempt, Extradition request, U.S.–Turkey tensions ===
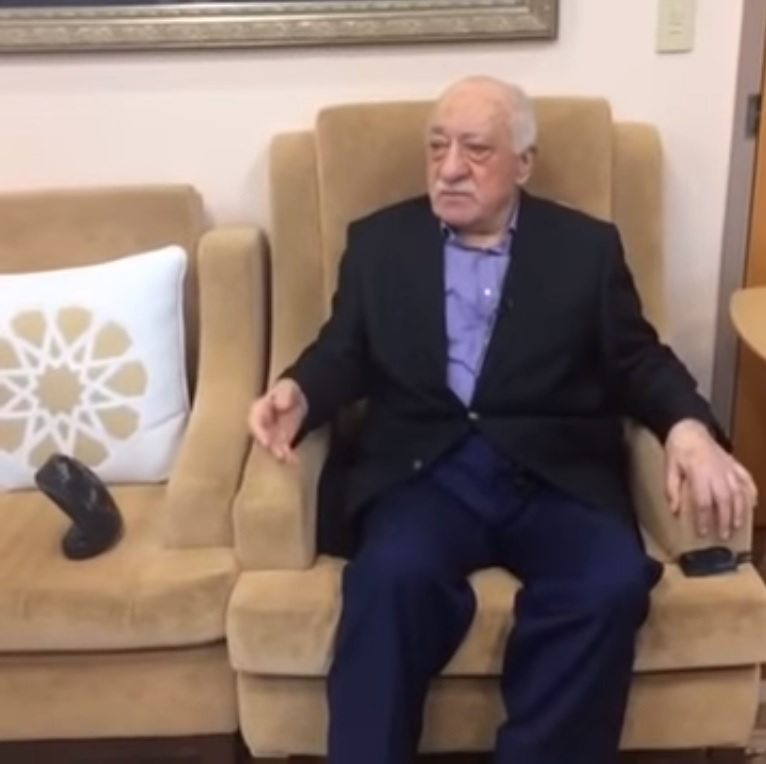
Fethullah Gülen in 2016

Immeditaly during the coup attempt on 15 July 2016, Erdogan stated that the coup attempt had been organized by Gülen and/or his movement. Turkish prime minister Binali Yıldırım in late July 2016 told The Guardian: "Of course, since the leader of this terrorist organisation is residing in the United States, there are question marks in the minds of the people whether there is any U.S. involvement or backing. So America from this point on should really think how they will continue to cooperate with Turkey, which is a strategic ally for them in the region and world." Gülen, who denied any involvement in the coup attempt and denounced it, has in turn accused Erdoğan of "turning a failed putsch into a slow-motion coup of his own against constitutional government."

On 19 July, an official request had been sent to the U.S. for the extradition of Fethullah Gülen. On 23 July 2016, Turkey formally submitted a formal extradition request accompanied by certain documents as supporting evidence. On 26 July, Gülen told The New York Times: "Turkey’s president is blackmailing the United States by threatening to curb his country’s support for the international coalition against the Islamic State. His goal: to ensure my extradition, despite a lack of credible evidence and virtually no prospect for a fair trial. The temptation to give Mr. Erdogan whatever he wants is understandable. But the United States must resist it." Senior U.S. officials said this evidence pertained to certain pre-coup alleged subversive activities. U.S. officials said they saw no terror links and repeatedly asked Turkey for evidence, rejecting its extradition requests.

On 19 September, Turkish government officials met with retired US Army Lt. General Mike Flynn, former CIA Director James Woolsey, and others to discuss legal and potentially illegal ways such as enforced disappearance for removing Gülen from the US. In March 2017, Flynn registered as a foreign agent for his 2016 lobbying work on behalf of the government of Turkey.

Rudy Giuliani privately urged Donald Trump in 2017 to extradite Gülen.

All Hizmet's schools, foundations and other entities in Turkey —more than 2,500 institutions worth an estimated 12 billion dollars—were closed and their properties seized by the Turkish government following the 2016 Turkish coup d'état attempt on 23 July. In addition, the Turkish government reportedly sought to pressure a number of foreign governments into shutting down schools and medical facilities allegedly associated with the Gülen movement including in Pakistan, Somalia, Germany, Indonesia, Nigeria and Kenya. In Somalia, two large schools and a hospital linked to the movement have been shut down following a request by the Turkish administration. Albania and Bosnia have also seen requests by Turkey to close or investigate Gülen-linked schools.

==== Egypt asylum proposal ====
In Egypt, MP Emad Mahrous called on the Egyptian government to grant asylum to Gülen in 2016. In the request, sent to Speaker of the House of Representatives Ali Abdel-Aal, Prime Minister Sherif Ismail and Foreign Minister Sameh Shoukry on 24 July 2016, Mahrous noted that "[Turkey] was a moderate Muslim country that [had] become an Islamist dictatorship at the hands of [Turkish president] Recep Tayyip Erdoğan and his affiliated Muslim Brotherhood political party", arguing that it was highly distasteful that Erdoğan has requested Gülen's extradition from the United States while at the same time "giving shelter to hundreds of leaders of the Muslim Brotherhood terrorist organisation and members of other bloody militant Islamist groups which attack Egypt by day and night".

Mahrous argued that Erdoğan had not only accused Gülen of plotting the failed coup attempt, but also used this allegation as an excuse to engage in mass purges against public institutions allegedly loyal to Gülen—"but at the same time Erdoğan [had] decided to turn Turkey into a media battleground against Egypt, with Turkish intelligence providing funds for several Muslim Brotherhood TV channels to attack Egypt". Mahrous stated that his advice to Gülen was to not wait until he would get extradited, but instead leave the United States and obtain permanent asylum in Egypt. Former Egyptian President Anwar Sadat granted asylum to Shah Mohammad Reza Pahlavi following his arrival in Egypt from the US, regardless of the threats that were issued by Iran's ayatollahs during the Iranian Revolution.

==== Continuing aftermath ====
In March 2017, former CIA Director James Woolsey told The Wall Street Journal that he had been at a 19 September 2016 meeting with then Trump campaign advisor Mike Flynn with Turkey's foreign minister, Mevlüt Çavuşoğlu, and energy minister, Berat Albayrak, where the possibility of Gulen's abduction and forced rendition to Turkey was discussed. Although no concrete kidnapping plan was discussed, Woolsey left the meeting, concerned that a general discussion about "a covert step in the dead of night to whisk this guy away" might be construed as illegal under American law. A spokesman for Flynn denied Woolsey's account, telling Business Insider that no nonjudicial removal had been discussed at the meeting.

In July 2017, one year after the anti-Erdoğan putsch, Gülen wrote: "Accusations against me related to the coup attempt are baseless, politically motivated slanders." In the 1990s, Gulen had been issued a special Turkish passport as a retired holder of the religious post, in the Turkish state religion of Sunni Islam, of mufti; in 2017 this passport was revoked. Unless Gulen travels to Turkey by the end of September 2017, he will be stateless. On 26 September 2017, Gulen asked for a United Nations commission to investigate the 2016 coup attempt.

Also, Gulen said in an interview with NPR: "To this day, I have stood against all coups. My respect for the military aside, I have always been against interventions. ... If any one among those soldiers had called me and told me of their plan, I would tell them, 'You are committing murder.' ... If they ask me what my final wish is, I would say the person [Erdogan] who caused all this suffering and oppressed thousands of innocents, I want to spit in his face."

On 28 September 2017, Erdoğan requested the U.S. to extradite Gülen in exchange for American pastor Andrew Brunson, under arrest in Turkey on charges related to Brunson's alleged affiliation with "FETO" (the Gulen movement); Erdoğan said, "You have a pastor too. Give him to us. ... Then we will try [Brunson] and give him to you". "You have a pastor too. ... You give us that one and we'll work with our judiciary and give back yours." The Federal judiciary alone determines extradition cases in the U.S. An August 2017 decree gave Erdogan authority to approve the exchange of detained or convicted foreigners with people held in other countries. Asked about the suggested swap on 28 September 2017, U.S. State Department spokeswoman Heather Nauert said: "I can't imagine that we would go down that road. ... We have received extradition requests for him [Gulen]." Anonymous US officials have said to reporters that the Turkish government has not yet provided sufficient evidence for the U.S. Justice Department to charge Gulen.

As of September 2017, what Turkey had provided the U.S. was information about Gulen dating to before the 2016 coup attempt and Turkey was in the process of compiling information allegedly linking Gulen to the coup attempt.

In 2017, Amnesty International and Human Rights Watch separately issued statements urging governments to avoid extraditions to Turkey.

In November 2018, the Trump administration asked the U.S. Justice Department to explore what legal justifications could be used, should it decide to seek for Gulen to be deported. On 17 November 2018, U.S. President Donald Trump announced that the issue of Gülen's extradition to Turkey was not on his agenda. On 17 December 2018, the US Department of Justice announced the indictment of two men, alleging that they acted "in the United States as illegal agents of the Government of Turkey" and conspired "to covertly influence U.S. politicians and public opinion against" Fethullah Gulen. The two men, former associates of ex-US national security adviser Michael Flynn, used the now-dissolved Flynn Intel Group in an effort to discredit Gulen dating back to July 2016, according to the indictment.

In a February 2019 opinion piece, Gülen said, "[I]n Turkey, a vast arrest campaign based on guilt by association is ongoing. The number of victims of this campaign of persecution keeps increasing... Erdogan is draining the reputation that the Turkish Republic has gained in the international arena, pushing Turkey into the league of nations known for suffocating freedoms andjailing democratic dissenters. The ruling clique is exploiting diplomatic relations, mobilizing government personnel and resources to harass, haunt and abduct Hizmet movement volunteers all around the world."

In 2022, U.S. Senate candidate for Pennsylvania Mehmet Oz predicted (to The Washington Post), "Gulen cannot be touched. There are no credible allegations that he was involved in the coup. He will stay in Pennsylvania."

== Thought and activism ==
=== Initiatives ===
The Gülen movement is a transnational Islamic civic society movement inspired by Gülen's teachings. His teachings about hizmet (altruistic service to the common good) have attracted a large number of supporters in Turkey, Central Asia, and increasingly in other parts of the world. (Note: In Lester Kurtz's (of University of Texas, Austin) words, "One of the most striking operationalizations of Gulen's fusion of commitment and tolerance is the nature of the Gulen movement, as it is often called, which has established hundreds of schools in many countries as a consequence of his belief in the importance of knowledge, and example in the building of a better world. The schools are a form of service to humanity designed to promote learning in a broader sense and to avoid explicit Islamic propaganda." Kurtz also cites in the same work the comments of Thomas Michel, General Secretary of the Vatican Secretariat for Inter-religious Dialogue, after a visit to a school in Mindanao, Philippines, where the local people suffered from a civil war, as follows: "In a region where kidnapping is a frequent occurrence, along with guerrilla warfare, summary raids, arrests, disappearances and killings by military and para-military forces, the school is offering Muslim and Christian Filipino children, along with an educational standard of high quality, a more positive way of living and relating to each other." Kurtz adds: "The purpose of the schools movement, therefore, is to lay the foundations for a more humane, tolerant citizenry of the world where people are expected to cultivate their own faith perspectives and also promote the well being of others ... It is significant to note that the movement has been so successful in offering high quality education in its schools, which recruit the children of elites and government officials, that it is beginning to lay the groundwork for high-level allies, especially in Central Asia, where they have focused much of their effort." See, Lester R. Kurtz, "Gulen's Paradox: Combining Commitment and Tolerance", Muslim World, Vol. 95, July 2005; 379–381.)

==== Education ====
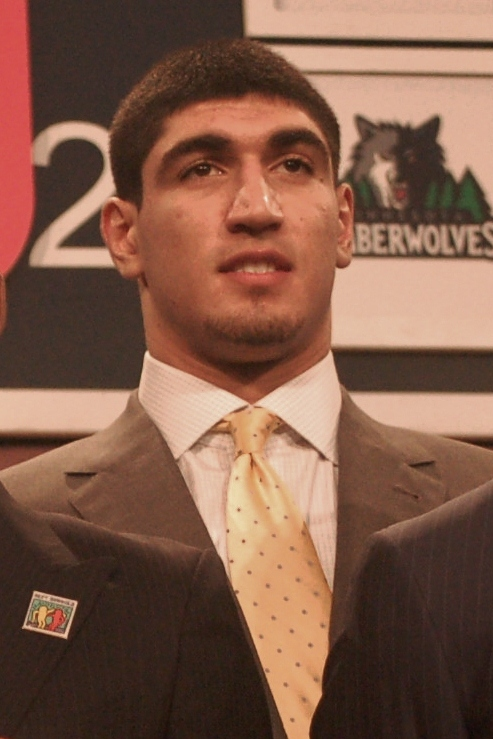
Enes Kanter Freedom, a former NBA player and human rights activist, is a graduate of a Gulen school and openly expressed his support for Gulen and the Gulen movement.

In his sermons, Gülen has reportedly stated: "Studying physics, mathematics, and chemistry is worshipping God." With regard to terrorism, Gülen believes "The antidote is a religious education program that teaches the tradition in a holistic and contextualized way. To be able to resist the deceits of radical ideologues, young Muslims must understand the spirit of their scripture and the overarching principles of their Prophet's life".

Gülen's followers have built over 2,000 schools and at least 25 universities around the world. In Turkey, Gülen's schools were considered among the best modern facilities where the English language is taught from the first grade. However, former teachers from outside the Gülen community have called into question the treatment of women and girls in Gülen schools, reporting that female teachers were excluded from administrative responsibilities, allowed little autonomy, and—along with girls from the sixth grade and up—segregated from male colleagues and pupils during break and lunch periods.

==== Interfaith and intercultural dialogue ====
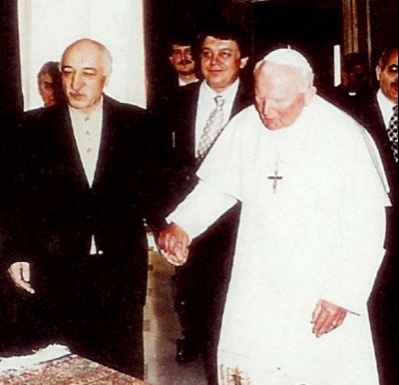
Gülen with Pope John Paul II in 1998 as part of interfaith dialogue efforts.

Gülen established the Journalists and Writers Foundation (Gazeteciler ve Yazarlar Vakfı) in 1994. The organization launched the Abant Platform meetings, which brought together Turkish citizens from diverse intellectual and religious backgrounds, including Muslims, secularists, traditionalists, atheists, Christians, leftists, modernists, and conservative to discuss and debate common positions on key contemporary issues.

During the 1990s, he began to advocate interreligious tolerance and dialogue. He has personally met with leaders of other religions, including Pope John Paul II, the Ecumenical Patriarch Bartholomew I of Constantinople, and Israeli Sephardic Chief Rabbi Eliyahu Bakshi-Doron.

Gülen has said that he favors cooperation between followers of different religions as well as religious and secular elements within society. Among his strongest supporters and collaborators has been for years the Greek Orthodox Turcologist and professor at the University of Ottawa, Dimitri Kitsikis.

Gülen has shown sympathy towards certain demands of Turkey's Alevi minority, such as recognising their cemevis as official places of worship and supporting better Sunni-Alevi relations; stating Alevis "definitely enrich Turkish culture".

=== Humanitarian Aid ===
Embrace Relief, a Gulen movement non-profit has provided over 40,500 cataract surgeries and more than 600,000 preventative health screenings in Uganda, Mali, Kenya and Burkina Faso. It has distributed over $540,000 of medical supplies to doctors.

=== Political views ===
==== Theology ====
Gülen does not advocate a new theology but refers to classical authorities of theology, taking up their line of argument. His understanding of Islam tends to be moderate and mainstream. Though he has never been a member of a Sufi tarekat and does not see tarekat membership as a necessity for Muslims, he teaches that "Sufism is the inner dimension of Islam" and "the inner and outer dimensions must never be separated."

He teaches that the Muslim community has a duty of service (Turkish: hizmet) to the common good of the community and the nation and to Muslims and non-Muslims all over the world; and that the Muslim community is obliged to conduct dialogue with not just the "People of the Book" (Jews and Christians), and people of other religions, but also with agnostics and atheists.

Gülen's Sufism is greatly influenced by Kurdish Quranic scholar Said Nursi (1877–1960), who advocated illuminating modern education and science through Islam. Gülen expands on Nursi to advocate what has been described as a "Turkish nationalist, state-centered and pro-business approach" centered on service (hizmet, in Turkish). Some participants within Gülen's movement have viewed Nursi's or Gülen's works as that of mujaddids or "renewers" of Islam within their respective times. Others have opined in more eschatological terms, equating Gülen's work as assistance toward the prophesied Mahdi to come, albeit Gülen's spokespersons discourage broaching such speculation. Gülen's website hosts an article entitled "Claiming to be the Mahdi is Deviation". In 2016, Turkey's Religious Affairs Directorate (Diyanet), Mehmet Görmez, said Gülen is a "fake Mahdi movement".

==== Anatolian nationalism; Turkish Islam ====
Gülen defines Turkish nationalism by particular type of Anatolian Muslim culture that is at the roots of the modern Turkish nation state, rather than by any specific ethnicity. He believes Turkish Islam (meaning "Sufism") an especially legitimate, if not an exclusively valid expression of the Islamic faith, especially with concern individuals of a Turkish background. Albeit Gülen ascribes positive characteristics to various localized entities, overall the tenor of Gülen's teachings warn against the human tendencies toward insularity or discriminations against people of other ethnicities, other branches of Islam, or other faiths.

==== Kurdish issues ====
He was accused of being against the peace process that had aimed to resolve the long-running Kurdish-Turkish conflict. However, Gülen's supporters dismiss this claim, citing his work with many Kurds. Gulen movement established the first Kurdish language private TV channel in Turkey in 2010. A study emphasized the effectiveness of the Gülen Movement’s non-political approaches to ethnic conflict, suggesting that its educational and community building efforts have helped reduce terrorist recruitment by the PKK and Hizbullah among youth in Mardin, a Kurdish majority city in Turkey.

==== Freedom of expression ====
Excerpt from Gülen-penned op-ed in The New York Times:

The core tenets of a functioning democracy – the rule of law, respect for individual freedoms – are also the most basic of Islamic values bestowed upon us by God. No political or religious leader has the authority to take them away ... Speaking against oppression is a democratic right, a civic duty and for believers, a religious obligation. The Quran makes clear that people should not remain silent in the face of injustice: "O you who believe! Be upholders and standard-bearers of justice, bearing witness to the truth for God's sake, even though it be against your own selves, or parents or kindred".

==== Secularism ====
Gülen has criticized secularism in Turkey as "reductionist materialism". However, he has in the past said that a secular approach that is "not anti-religious" and "allows for freedom of religion and belief, is compatible with Islam."

According to one Gülen press release, in democratic-secular countries, 95% of Islamic principles are permissible and practically feasible, and there is no problem with them. The remaining 5% "are not worth fighting for".

Gülen does not favor for the implementation of Sharia law by the state. He argues that most Islamic regulations pertain to individual's private life, while only a small portion relate to governance.

He states that the democratic form of government is the best choice, and is very critical of the regimes in Iran and Saudi Arabia.

==== Turkish bid to join the EU ====
Gülen has supported Turkey's bid to join the European Union and has said that neither Turkey nor the EU have anything to fear, but have much to gain, from a future of full Turkish membership in the EU.

==== Women's roles ====
According to Aras and Caha, Gülen's views on women are "progressive". Gülen says the coming of Islam saved women, who "were absolutely not confined to their home and ... never oppressed" in the early years of the religion. He feels that extreme feminism, however, is "doomed to imbalance like all other reactionary movements" and eventually "being full of hatred towards men".

Gulen movement established many schools for girls in countries such as Turkey, Tanzania, Senegal, and Nigeria, expanding access to education for communities where opportunities for girls were otherwise limited

Gulen stated that "no one should suppress the progress of women through the clothes they wear." He also said, "no one should be subject to criticism for his or her clothing or thoughts." and "women can become administrators," contradicting the views of some of the classical Islamic intellectuals.

Gulen suggested that women to learn martial arts to defend themselves against domestic abuse, stating "I wish women would take karate, taekwondo or judo courses. If he hits once, she should hit him twice". He also stated "Prophet Muhammad (peace and blessing be upon him) and his companions never beat their wives".

==== Terrorism ====
Gülen has condemned terrorism. He warns against the phenomenon of arbitrary violence and aggression against civilians and said that it "has no place in Islam". He wrote a condemnation article in The Washington Post on 12 September 2001, one day after the September 11 attacks, and stated that "A Muslim can not be a terrorist, nor can a terrorist be a true Muslim." Gülen lamented the "hijacking of Islam" by terrorists.

==== Gaza flotilla ====
Gülen criticized the Turkish-led Gaza flotilla for trying to deliver aid without Israel's consent to Palestinians in Gaza. He spoke of watching the news coverage of the deadly confrontation between Israeli commandos and multinational aid group members as its flotilla approached Israel's sea blockade of Gaza. He said, "What I saw was not pretty, it was ugly." He has since continued his criticism, saying later that the organizers' failure to seek accord with Israel before attempting to deliver aid was "a sign of defying authority, and will not lead to fruitful matters."

==== Syrian civil war ====
Gülen is strongly against Turkish involvement in the Syrian civil war. While rejecting the Turkish government's desire to topple the Syrian government of President Bashar al-Assad, Gülen supports military intervention against ISIL.

==== Armenian genocide ====
Addressing the Armenian genocide in a 6 May 1965 letter, Gülen wrote:

I have known Armenian families and individuals during my childhood and working positions. I will not stop cursing the Great Genocide committed against Armenians in 1915. I know that among the people killed and massacred were many highly respected individuals, for whose memory I bow with respect. I curse with great grief the massacre of the sons of the Great Prophet Christ by ignorant individuals who call themselves Muslims."

== Publications ==
Gülen's official website lists 44 publications by him; these are, however, more akin to essays and collections of sermons than books on specific subjects with a specific thesis. He is also said to have authored many articles on a variety of topics: social, political and religious issues, art, science and sports, and recorded thousands of audio and video cassettes. He writes the lead article for The Fountain, Yeni Ümit, Sızıntı, and Yağmur Islamic philosophical magazines. Several of his books have been translated into English.

- The Messenger of God: Muhammad, Tughra Books, 2nd edition, 2008. ISBN 1597841374
- Reflections on the Qur'an: Commentaries on Selected Verses, Tughra Books, 2012. ISBN 1597842648
- Toward Global Civilization Love and Tolerance, Tughra Books, 2010.
- From Seed to Cedar: Nurturing the Spiritual Needs in Children, Tughra Books, 2013. ISBN 1597842788
- Terror and Suicide Attacks: An Islamic Perspective, Tughra Books, 2008. ISBN 1932099743
- Journey to Noble Ideals: Droplets of Wisdom from the Heart (Broken Jug), Tughra Books, 2014. ISBN 1597843482
- Speech and Power of Expression, Tughra Books, 2010. ISBN 1597842168
- Selected Prayers of Prophet Muhammad, Tughra Books, 2012. ISBN 1597842265

== Reception ==
Martin Luther King Jr. International Chapel at Morehouse College awarded its 2015 Gandhi King Ikeda Peace Award to Gülen in recognition of his lifelong dedication to promoting peace and human rights. Gülen topped the 2008 Top 100 Public Intellectuals Poll of the Foreign Policy and came out as the most influential thinker.

Gülen was named as one of Time magazine's 100 Most Influential People in 2013.

In 2015, Oklahoma City Thunder basketball player and human rights activist Enes Kanter said that he was excluded from the Turkish national basketball team for his public support of Gülen. Kanter was disowned by his family in 2016 due to his support for Gülen.

Gülen was listed as one of the 500 most influential Muslims by the Royal Islamic Strategic Studies Centre in Amman, Jordan.

A documentary movie titled Love Is a Verb and narrated by Ashley Judd was made in 2014 about the Gulen movement.

On 14–15 November 2008, Georgetown University hosted a conference on Fethullah Gülen titled "Islam in the Age of Global Challenges."

== Rise Up (Colors of Peace) album ==
Rise Up (Colors of Peace) was a musical project to turn Gülen's poems and writings in Turkish language into songs. A total of 50 poems were sent to various Muslim and non-Muslim artists from various countries, who were free to pick, and then compose and vocalize the poem chosen, record it in their own country and send it back for inclusion in the planned album. Reportedly, no restrictions were put on the artists in using instrumentation, despite reservations by stricter Muslim interpretations about music and use of musical instruments. The album Rise Up (Colors of Peace) turned into an album of world music encompassing various genres like jazz, pop, flamenco, rai, Indian music among others.
