= Gülen movement =

International Islamist fraternal movement

- Gülen hareketi
- Nickname: Gülenciler ("Gülenists"); Hizmet ("Ministry, Service"); Cemaat ("Community")
- Founder: Fethullah Gülen
- Founded at: İzmir, Turkey
- Headquarters: 1969–1999 İzmir, Turkey; 1999–present Saylorsburg, Pennsylvania
- Origins: Turkey
- Region served: Worldwide
- Fields: Education, banking, media, healthcare
- Members: Several hundred thousand to a couple of million
- Official language: Turkish
- Leader: Fethullah Gülen (1969–2024)

The Gülen movement or Hizmet movement (Turkish: Gülen hareketi) is an international social, educational and Islamic fraternal movement founded by Fethullah Gülen in Turkey in the late 1970s and based in Pennsylvania since 1999. It is institutionalised in estimated 160 countries through STEM focused schools, universities as well as media outlets, interfaith dialogue organisations, charities, finance companies, health clinics that have a combined net worth in the range of 20–50 billion dollars as of 2015. After Gülen's death in October 2024, the New York based Alliance for Shared Values, stated that Gülen had not been actively involved in its operations in the last few years and his work would be carried forward by a group of close associates who had been advising him.

Its followers are mostly Sunni Muslims based on a Nursian theological perspective as reflected in Gülen's religious teachings. Its teachings are considered conservative in Turkey but some have praised the movement as a pacifist, modern-oriented version of Islam, and an alternative to more extreme schools of Islam such as Salafism. On the other hand, it has also been reported to have a "cultish hierarchy" and as being a secretive Islamic sect.

The movement's legal and political status underwent significant transformation beginning in May 2016, when Turkish state authorities declared it as a terrorist organisation. This designation was adopted by select strategically aligned states, namely Pakistan and the Gulf Cooperation Council. However, the Gülen movement is not recognised as a terrorist organisation by democratic supranational organisations like the European Union and countries like the United States, the United Kingdom, Canada, Japan, Australia and New Zealand due to lack of credible evidence. These countries continue to accept refugee claims from its followers.

Following the 2016 coup attempt, President Erdoğan immediately blamed the Gülen movement, labeling the event a "gift from God" to justify a state purge. This resulted in the immediate arrest of thousands of soldiers and judges, the dismissal of 150,000 government employees, and the suspension or license revocation of over 20,000 educators allegedly linked to the movement.

Eight days after the coup attempt on July 23, 2016, the Turkish government had shut down 1,043 private schools, 1,229 charities, 19 trade unions, 15 universities, and 35 medical institutions allegedly linked to the Gülen movement, seizing properties valued at $12 billion. Nearly 3,000,000 citizens of Turkey were investigated for terrorism between 2016 and 2024, and 511,000 were arrested for alleged links to the Gülen movement. According to the historian Michael Rubin, the coup attempt was staged to serve Erdoğan's interests, "to allow a dictator to consolidate power".

Gülen condemned the coup, denied involvement, and called for an international commission to investigate the failed coup, saying he would accept its findings if found guilty.

== Membership ==
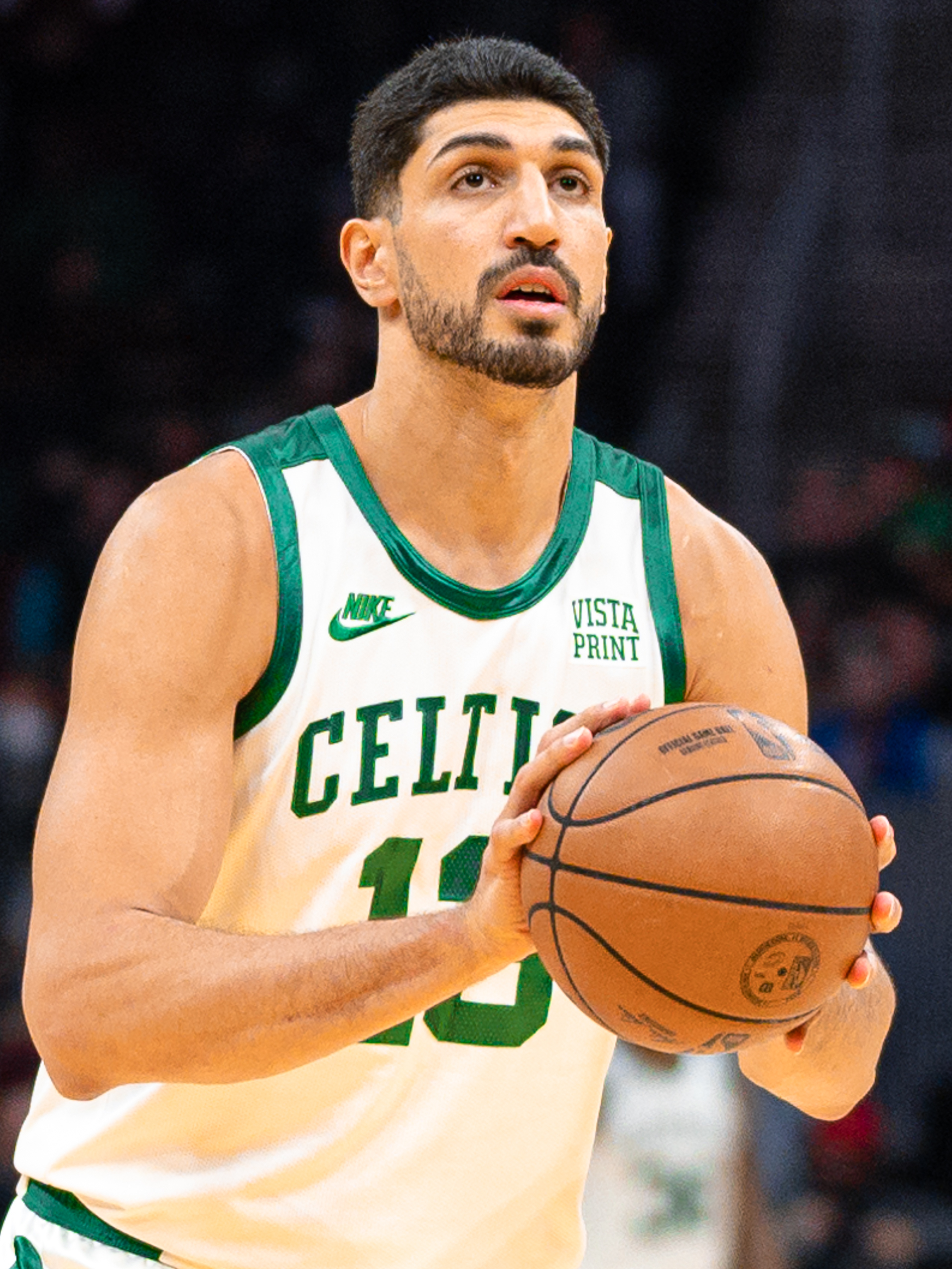
Enes Kanter Freedom openly expressed his support for the Gülen movement

A true count of the membership is unknown since the movement is not a centralised or formal organisation with membership rosters, but rather a set of numerous, loosely organised networks of people inspired by Gülen. Estimates of the size of the movement vary, with one estimate by Tempo in 1997 stating that between 200,000 supporters and 4 million people are influenced by Gülen's ideas, and another source stating that Gülen has "hundreds of thousands of supporters". The membership of the movement consists primarily of students, teachers, businessmen, academics, journalists and other professionals. Some well known people who are or were affiliated with the movement include former NBA player Enes Kanter Freedom and soccer star Hakan Şükür.

== Organisation ==
The movement states that it is based on moral values and advocacy of universal access to education, civil society, tolerance and peace. The emphasis among participants is to perform "ministry" (which is the meaning of the Turkish word "hizmet") as arising from individuals' personal commitments to righteous imperatives. Along with hizmet, the movement, which has no official name, is termed the Gülen movement or cemaat (the latter also used to describe participants in Sufi orders, meaning "congregation", "community", or "assembly").

The movement's structure has been described as a flexible organisational network.

=== Lay clergy (Imam-Mullah-Shaykh) ===
Akin to Turkey's Sufi tariqas are lay religious orders which have been banned in Turkey since 1925. Movement schools and businesses organize locally and link themselves into informal networks. Each local Gülen movement school and community has a person designated its "informal" prayer leader (imam). In Turkey, an imam is state-sponsored. In the Gülen movement, this individual is a layman who serves for a stint within this volunteer position, lay clergy. His identity is kept confidential, generally only purposely made known to those with close connections to those participating in decision-making and coordinating councils within the local group. Above a grouping of such "secret" (not-publicly acknowledged) imams is another such volunteer leader. This relationship tree continues on up the ladder to the nation-level imam and to individuals who consult with Gülen himself. These individuals closest to Gülen, having degrees from theology schools, are offhandedly referred to within the movement as mullahs. Gülen's position, as described in the foregoing, is analogous to that of a shaykh (master) of a Sufi tariqa. Unlike with traditional tariqas, no-one makes pledges of any sort, upon joining the Gülen movement; one becomes a movement participant simply by working with others to promote and effect the movement's objectives of education and service.

The Süddeutsche Zeitung quoted a German lawyer that called the organisation "more powerful than the Illuminati" and "not transparent as opposed to the claims", and reported that the organisation tried to reorganise in the Swabia region of Germany.

Gülen died in Pennsylvania in October 2024 after previously being treated in a hospital. The New York–based Alliance for Shared Values, a nonprofit linked to the Gülen movement, stated that Gülen had not been actively involved in the movement in recent years and that his work would be carried forward by a group of close associates who had advised him for decades.

== Associated organisations ==
Gülen and the Gülen movement are technology-friendly, work within current market and commerce structures, and are savvy users of modern communications and public relations.

Its members have founded schools, universities, hospitals, an employers' association, charities, real estate trusts, student organisations, radio and television stations, and newspapers.

Hizmet-affiliated foundations and businesses were estimated to be worth $20–50 billion in 2015.

=== Schools ===
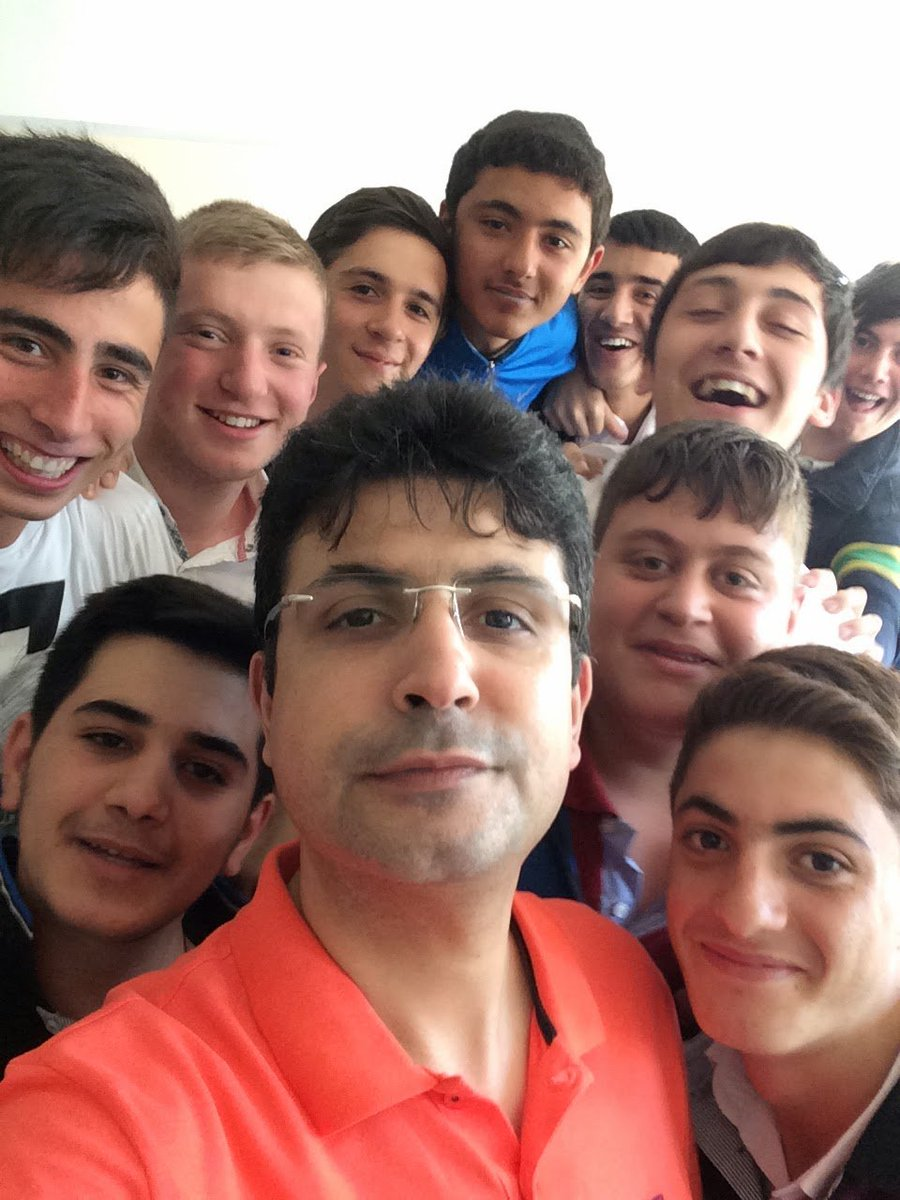
Gökhan Açıkkollu, a teacher from a Gülen-affiliated school died in police custody after being imprisoned and tortured for 13 days post 2016 coup attempt.

Schools associated with the Gülen movement can be found in countries with large populations of people of Turkish descent as well as in predominantly non-Turkish Muslim countries where they provide families with an alternative to madrasa education. The schools are open to both Turkish migrants and citizens of host countries, and they avoid pushing for a religious agenda. Many alumni of Gülen schools pursue elite careers in diplomacy and international institutions. There were about 1000 Gülen schools in Turkey that an estimated 1.2 million Turks passed through (Including many of Erdoğan's relatives). However, after the attempted coup in 2016, all of the schools were shut down and banned by law.

In 2009, it was estimated that Gülen linked schools around the world enrolled more than 2 million students. Estimates of the number of schools and educational institutions but it appears there were about 300 Gülen Movement schools in Turkey and over 1,000 schools worldwide at that time. Later reporting by the Wall Street Journal estimated around 150 schools just in the United States, "ranging from networks in Texas, Illinois and Florida to stand-alone academies in Maryland". Although there is no formal networking of all the schools, collectively they form one of the largest collections of charter schools in the United States.

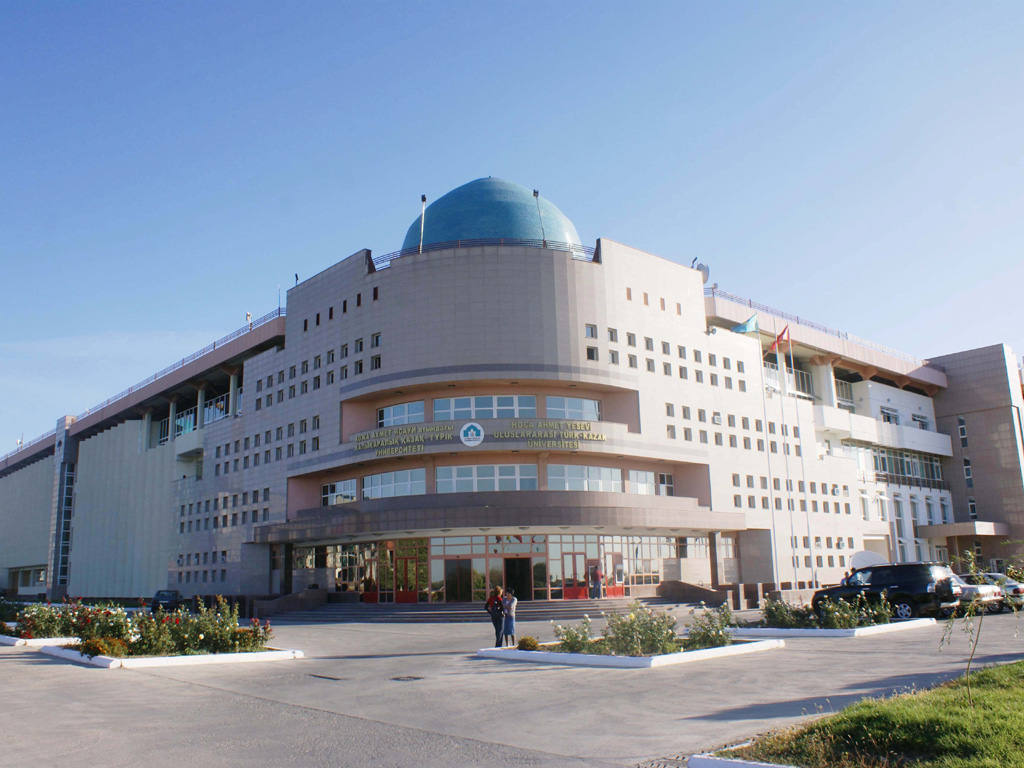
Ahmet Yassawi University, a private university affiliated with the Gülen movement located in Turkistan, Kazakhstan

Most Gülen movement associated schools are private schools or charter schools. The curricula of the schools vary from country to country but they generally follow a secular mixture of Turkish and local curricula with an emphasis on science and math. A 2008 article in the New York Times said that in Pakistan "they encourage Islam in their dormitories, where teachers set examples in lifestyle and prayer", and described the Turkish schools as offering a gentler approach to Islam that could help reduce the influence of extremism. However, in America, "there is no indication the American charter network has a religious agenda in the classroom", according to The Philadelphia Inquirer. Two American professors at the Lutheran Theological Seminary at Philadelphia and Temple University wrote that "these schools have consistently promoted good learning and citizenship, and the Hizmet movement is to date an evidently admirable civil society organisation to build bridges between religious communities and to provide direct service on behalf of the common good". Professor Joshua Hendrick of Loyola University Maryland, who studies the movement, said that Gülen himself "does not have a direct hand in operating" the charter schools and it was reported that Gülen has never visited the schools. Alp Aslandoğan, director of the Alliance for Shared Values said that the schools are independent yet indirectly tied to the Gülen movement on the "intellectual or inspirational level".

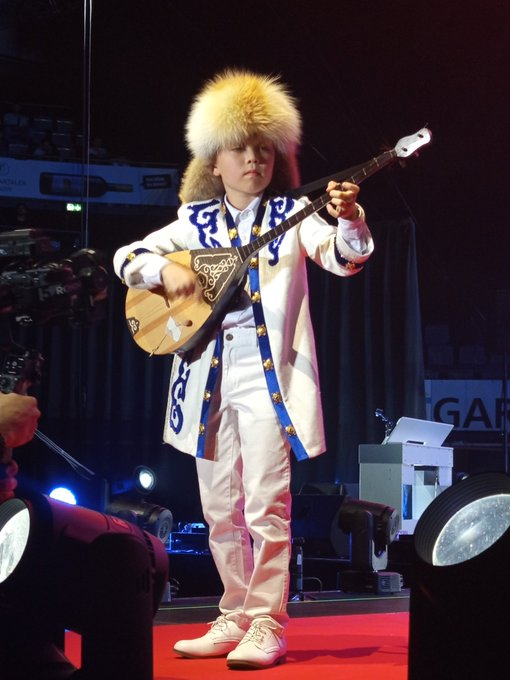
A Kazakh boy playing dombra in traditional clothing during an IFLC festival

In Europe there has been some pushback to the establishment of schools associated with the movement. In Georgia, the Georgian Labour Party protested schools opening on the basis that they "aim to spread Turkish culture and fundamentalist religious ideas". In the Netherlands, there were concerns that the schools would promote "anti-integrative behavior" however an investigation in 2010 by the AIVD intelligence organization found that the schools did not represent a threat. In the United States there have been allegations and investigations into money-laundering and kickbacks at charter schools connected to the Gülen movement which receive federal financial support. Schools in Texas were accused of sending school funds to Gülen associated organizations by prioritizing construction contracts with Turkish expatriate-owned construction companies over more economical bids, according to reporting by The New York Times in 2011. Folwell Dunbar, an official at the Louisiana Department of Education, accused İnci Akpınar, vice president of one such construction company, of offering him a $25,000 bribe to keep quiet about troubling conditions at the Abramson Science and Technology School in New Orleans which was operated by the Pelican Foundation.

As of 2015 there were over 100 K-12 schools in Africa, including schools in Morocco, Mali, Chad, Niger, Nigeria, Mauritania, Senegal, Cameroon, Kenya, South Africa, Uganda, Congo, Burkina Faso, Tanzania, Egypt, and Angola.

The movement held an annual international youth performing arts contest called the International International Festival of Language and Culture since 2003 bringing students from Gulen movement schools together.

=== Media organisations ===
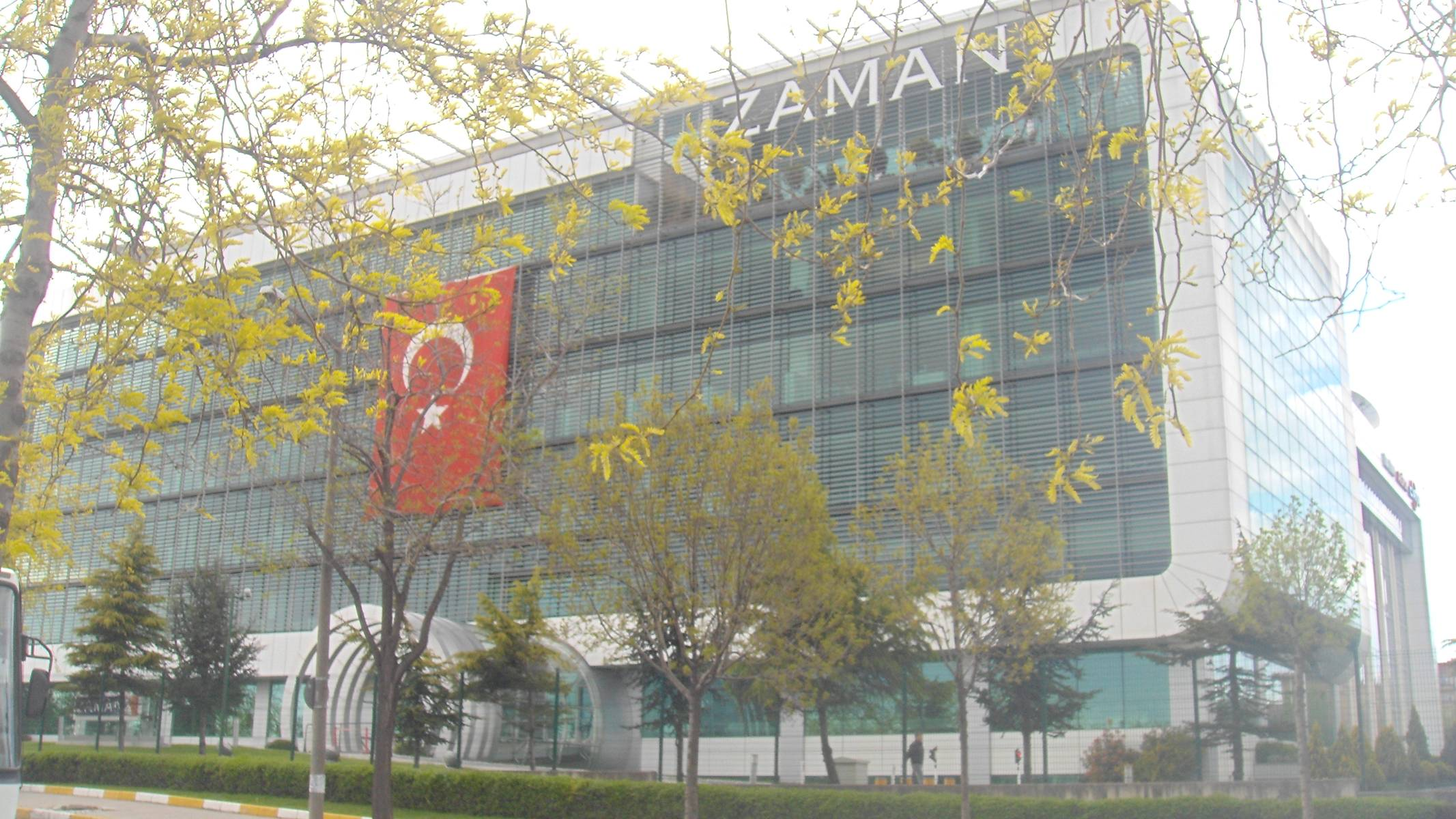
Zaman newspaper headquarters, one of the most widely circulated newspapers in Turkey before it was seized by the Turkish government

Movement members have set up a number of media organisations to promote its core values such as love, tolerance, hope, dialogue, activism, mutual acceptance and respect. These media organs include TV stations (Samanyolu TV, Samanyolu Haber TV, Mehtap TV), (Ebru TV) (English), the newspapers Zaman, Today's Zaman (English), magazines and journals in Turkish like Aksiyon, Sızıntı, Yeni Ümit, Çağlayan, The Fountain Magazine (English), Hira (Arabic), The International Cihan News Agency and the radio station Burç FM.

=== Charitable foundations ===
The movement runs charity and humanitarian aid organisations internationally. Among them is the Istanbul-based Kimse Yok Mu Association (KYM). KYM organises charity campaigns to help those in need in different parts of the world. Like any other activities of the Gülen-movement, KYM runs local projects responding to specific needs. KYM holds UN Ecosoc Special status.

Another charity organisation Embrace Relief was established in New Jersey and is active in America, Asia and Africa. Embrace Relief has provided over 40,500 cataract surgeries and more than 600,000 preventative health screenings in Uganda, Mali, Kenya and Burkina Faso. It has distributed over $540,000 of medical supplies to doctors.

== Faith, practice, and experience ==
The movement has been characterised as a "moderate blend of Islam". A 2008 article in The Economist stated that the Gülen movement is vying to be recognised as the world's leading Muslim network, one that is more reasonable than many of its rivals. The movement has been claimed to be "world's most global movement". Fethullah Gülen's and the Gülen movement's views and practices have been discussed in several international conferences at academic level including California State University in US, University of Toronto in Canada, O. P. Jindal Global University in India.

=== Interfaith dialogue ===
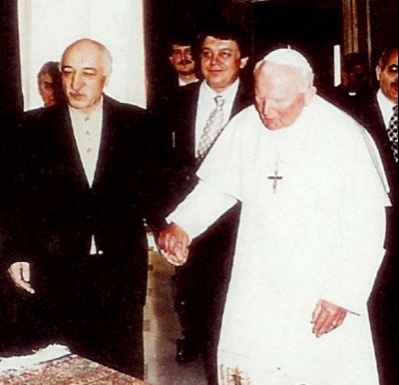
Gülen and Pope John Paul II

The movement's avowal of interfaith dialogue grew out of Gülen's personal engagement in interfaith dialogue which was largely inspired by Said Nursi. Gülen has met with leaders of other religions, including Pope John Paul II, the Ecumenical Patriarch Bartholomew I, and Israeli Sephardic Head Rabbi Eliyahu Bakshi-Doron. Gülen advocates for cooperation between followers of different religions as well as those practicing different forms of Islam (such as Sunnism or Alevism).

Gülen movement participants have founded a number of institutions across the World that promote interfaith and intercultural dialogue activities. Among these are the Journalists and Writers Foundation in Istanbul, the Rumi Forum in Washington and the Indialogue Foundation in New Delhi.

=== Devotional practices ===
David Tittensor wrote, "[Detractors] have labeled Gülen community members as secretive missionaries, while those in the Movement and sympathetic observers class it as a civil society organisation".

Critics have complained that members of the Gülen movement are overly compliant with the directions from its leaders, and Gülen's "movement is generally perceived by its critics as a religio-political cult". The Guardian editorial board described the movement in 2013 as having "some of the characteristics of a cult or of an Islamic Opus Dei".

Scholars such as Simon Robinson disagree with the characterisation, writing that although "[t]here is no doubt that Gülen remains a charismatic leader and that members of the movement hold him in the highest respect", the movement "differs markedly from a cult in several ways", with Gülen stressing "the primacy of the scriptures" and "the imperative of service" and consistently avoiding "attempts to institutionalise power, to perceive him as the source of all truth, or to view him as taking responsibility for the movement". Zeki Saritoprak says that the view of Gülen as "a cult leader or a man with ambitions" is mistaken, and contends that Gülen should be viewed in the context of a long line of Sufi masters who have long been a center of attention "for their admirers and followers, both historically and currently".

=== Relations to the state ===
Gülen movement received support from some of the Turkish politicians like conservative Turgut Özal, leftist Bülent Ecevit. Özal visited Gülen schools in Central Asian countries and endorsed them, 3 days later he was assassinated.

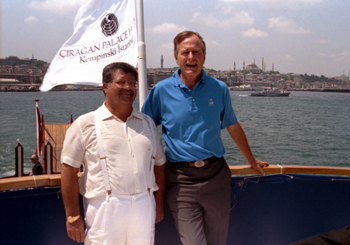
Turgut Özal with George H. W. Bush on the Bosphorus in 1991.

The Gülen movement works within the given structures of modern secular states; it encourages affiliated members to maximise the opportunities those countries afford rather than engaging in subversive activities. Per the words of the leader himself and the title of a cornerstone of his philosophy, Gülen promotes "an Ottoman Empire of the Mind".

Beginning in 2008, the Dutch government investigated the movement's activities in the Netherlands in response to questions from Parliament. The first two investigations, performed by the AIVD, concluded that the movement did not form a breeding ground for radicalism and found no indications that the movement worked against integration or that it was involved in terrorism or religious radicalisation. A further academic study sketched a portrait of a socially conservative, inwardly directed movement with an opaque organisational structure, but said that its members tend to be highly successful in society and thus form no threat to integration.

=== Relations to politics ===
Neither Gülen nor his followers have formed a national political party, but they have had political involvement or parliamentary representation for a brief time. Two supporters of the movement Hakan Şükür, Muhammed Çetin served as AKP MP's between 2011 and 2013. In 2008, Gülen was described as "the modern face of the Sufi Ottoman tradition", reassuring his followers, including many members of "Turkey's aspirational middle class", that "they can combine the statist-nationalist beliefs of Atatürk's republic with a traditional but flexible Islamic faith" and "Ottoman traditions [have] been caricatured as theocratic by Atatürk and his 'Kemalist' heirs". In the early 2000s, the Gülen movement was seen as keeping a distance from established Islamic political parties.

Gülen met with various politicians from both right-wing and left-wing but generally avoided meeting with political Islamists. When the Islamist Justice and Development Party (AKP) came to power in 2002, the two groups formed a non-aggression pact against the military and the Turkish secular elite despite their differences. According to some research, the cooperation between AKP and the Gülen movement was a shallow, tactical alliance that got stronger in 2007 due to perceived threats of a coup, which both groups believed would harm their interests.

Once the old establishment had been defeated, disagreements began emerging between the AKP and the Gülen movement. The first breaking point was the so-called "MİT crisis" in February 2012 which has been interpreted as a power struggle between the AKP and the pro-Gülen police and judiciary. The tensions increased after Gülen criticised Erdoğan's heavy handed response to Gezi Park protests. After corruption investigations in December 2013 into several politicians and family members of the ruling AKP of Turkey by the allegedly Gülen friendly judiciary, President Recep Tayyip Erdoğan claimed the movement had initiated the investigations as a result of a break in previously friendly relations. The leaked conversation between Erdoğan and his son, which triggered the corruption scandal was viewed by 3 million people in 24 hours on YouTube. President Erdoğan said Gülen had attempted to overthrow the Turkish government through a judicial coup using the investigations. In response to the investigations, the government seized the group-owned newspaper Zaman, which was one of the most circulated newspapers in Turkey, as well as several companies that had ties to the group totaling billions of dollars.

According to academic researcher and foreign lobbyist Svante E. Cornell, director of the Central Asia-Caucasus Institute & Silk Road Studies Program, "With only slight exaggeration, the ruling Justice and Development Party (AKP) as well as the government it has led could be termed a coalition of religious orders."

"[...T]he Gülen movement stayed away from electoral politics, focusing instead on increasing its presence in the state bureaucracy. The Hizmet movement's stated success in this regard would initially make it Erdoğan's main partner, but also his eventual nemesis."

== Scandals and incidents ==
=== Bombing of Şemdinli Bookstore, 2005 ===
On 9 November 2005, a bookstore was bombed in Şemdinli. The prosecutor for the case, Ferhat Sarıkaya, prepared a criminal indictment in which Turkey's Commander of Land Forces, Yaşar Büyükanıt, was accused of forming a gang and plotting the bombing. In 2016 Sarıkaya confessed that he was ordered by Gülenists to include General Yaşar Büyükanıt in the criminal indictment to prevent his promotion in the army and to ease the pressure on Gülenist structures within the army. The defendants, Ali Kaya, Özcan İldeniz, and Veysel Ateş, were acquitted of the bombing on 20 December 2021.

=== Assassination of Hrant Dink, 2007 ===
Allegations have been made about the role of the Gülen movement in the assassination of journalist Hrant Dink in Istanbul. Hakan Bakırcıoğlu, one of Hrant Dink's lawyers, said in an interview with Deutsche Welle that the under-aged perpetrator, Ogün Samast, had help from third parties, including people connected to the Istanbul and Trabzon police forces.

Four prosecutors in the trial were dismissed from their posts due to their ties with the movement and for failing to make progress with the case. Furthermore, police commissioners Ramazan Akyürek and Ali Fuat Yılmazer were accused of not sharing their foreknowledge of the attack with the prosecutors, the gendarmerie, or the intelligence services despite being briefed of a planned assassination several times.

In 2023, the Dink family stated that the real perpetrator is the deep-state: "If this case is closed in its current state, and the deep-state mechanism of many years is simply labeled as 'FETÖ’ — the Turkish government's designation for the alleged terrorist Gülen movement — and passed over, without an effective investigation being conducted, who will be responsible for the other lives that may be lost in the coming years"

=== Ergenekon trials, 2008-2016 ===
Questions have arisen about the Gülen movement's possible involvement in the Ergenekon investigation, which critics characterised as "a pretext" by the government "to neutralize dissidents" in Turkey.

Journalist Nedim Şener was arrested for being a member of the Ergenekon organisation and was held in pre-trial detention in 2011.

The Gülen movement has also been implicated in what the opposition Republican People's Party (CHP) has said were illegal court decisions against members of the Turkish military, including many during the Ergenekon investigation. These claims were also supported by President Recep Tayyip Erdoğan after 2013.

=== Sex and corruption tapes, 2010 ===
Members of the Gülen movement inside the intelligence agency have been accused of reshaping Turkish politics to a more "workable form" by leaking secretly filmed sex tapes and corruption tapes of members of the government, with the resignation of main opposition leader Deniz Baykal in 2010 as the most notable example. Deniz Baykal stated that he did not share the view of pro-government media outlets that blamed the Gülen movement for the release of the video recording, arguing that such an operation could not have been carried out without the knowledge and approval of senior government figures. In two separate interviews given in 2010 and 2016, Baykal expressed his perspective by saying, “In this context, to assist those seeking to identify other responsible parties, I would like to note that I believe in the sincerity of the messages of sympathy and support I received from the United States and Pennsylvania (Gülen movement)."

=== The Imam's Army, 2011 ===
In March 2011, seven Turkish journalists were arrested, including Ahmet Şık, who had been writing a book, "İmamın Ordusu" (The Imam's Army), which states that the Gülen movement has infiltrated the country's security forces. As Şık was taken into police custody, he shouted, "Whoever touches it [the movement] gets burned!". Upon his arrest, drafts of the book were confiscated and its possession was banned. Şık has also been charged with being part of the Ergenekon plot despite investigating the plot before his arrest.

In a reply, Abdullah Bozkurt, from the Gülen aligned newspaper Today's Zaman, said Ahmet Şık was not an investigative journalist conducting "independent research", but was hatching "a plot designed and put into action by the terrorist network itself".

=== Corruption scandal, 2013 ===
On 17 December 2013, an investigation into corrupt practices by several bureaucrats, ministers, mayors, and family members of the ruling Justice and Development Party (AKP) of Turkey was uncovered, resulting in widespread protests and the resignation of four ministers of the government led by Prime Minister Erdoğan. Due to the high level of political influence of the Gülen movement in Turkey, it was rumored that the investigation was facilitated by the movement's influence in the Turkish police force and the judiciary. The investigation was said to be a result of a break in the previously friendly relations between the Islamist-rooted government and the movement.

President Erdoğan and the AKP (the ruling party of Turkey) have targeted the movement since December 2013. Immediately after the investigation became public, the government subjugated the judiciary, media and civil society which were critical of the government's authoritarian trend in recent years. Erdoğan labelled the investigations as a "civilian coup" against his government. Since then, Erdoğan has shuffled, dismissed or jailed hundreds of police officers, judges, prosecutors and journalists in the name of fighting against a "Parallel State" within the Turkish state.

=== Media arrests, 2014 ===
On 14 December 2014, Turkish police arrested more than two dozen senior journalists and media executives connected with the Gülen movement on various charges.

The US State Department cautioned Turkey to not violate its "own democratic foundations" while drawing attention to the raids against media outlets "openly critical of the current Turkish government". EU Foreign Affairs chief Federica Mogherini and EU Enlargement Commissioner Johannes Hahn said that the arrests went "against European values" and "are incompatible with the freedom of media, which is a core principle of democracy".

The Turkish government seized the Gülen affiliated Zaman and Today's Zaman, on 4 March 2016. Turkish police entered the headquarters by force and fired tear gas at protesting journalists and civilians. Hundreds of protestors were injured. In their effort to eradicate the movement from within the country the Turkish National Security Council has identified the movement as the "Gülenist Terror Organisation" ("Fethullahçı Terör Örgütü", FETÖ). The government has also been targeting individuals and businessmen who have supported the movement's organizations and activities.

=== Eavesdropping on state offices, 2015 ===
On 20 January 2015, Turkish police arrested around twenty suspects over alleged illegal surveillance on President Erdoğan and other officials. The arrests were described in local media as targeting Gülen's supporters.

=== 15 July 2016 coup attempt ===
In reaction to the 15 July 2016 coup attempt which was led by a military faction operating outside the chain of command, the Turkish government quickly stated the coup's leader to be Gülen. In following days and weeks, a massive crackdown affected all entities affiliated with the Gülen movements, from individuals to businesses, newspapers and schools.

Since the 2016 coup attempt, Turkey became more and more authoritarian under Erdoğan regime, according to Reporters Without Borders as of 2025 90% of the media is controlled by the government and Turkey ranks 159th out of 180 countries in terms freedom of press. Freedom House has been rating Turkey as "Not Free" since 2018. Turkey's ranking in the World Justice Project Rule of law index declined significantly between 2015 and 2025 (especially after the 2016 coup attempt), falling from 80th place to 118th out of 143 countries. As of 2025, Turkey ranks 14th out of 15 countries in the Eastern Europe and Central Asia region.

==== Purges from state offices ====
Between the 2016 coup attempt and July 2024, Turkish authorities investigated more than 705,172 Turkish citizens related to alleged "FETÖ" terrorism according to the government's own official statement, however non-governmental sources estimate this number much higher. In November 2021 DEVA Party MP Yeneroğlu criticised that 1,576,000 people were investigated for alleged terrorism links between 2016 and 2020. Eren Keskin the president of Human Rights Association stated that, she never seen such restrictions on freedom of speech in the 30 years of her career. The government also detained over 390,000 citizens, purged over 300,000 government officials and closed more than 1,500 nongovernmental organizations, primarily for alleged ties to the Gülen movement.

In 2018, approximately 25,000 Turkish asylum requests were filed by alleged Gülenists in the European Union (a rise of 50% from 2017), with Germany's share 10,000 and Greece's about 5,000. In the U.S., according to news reports, a number of Gülenists who have successfully receiving political asylum status resettled in New Jersey.

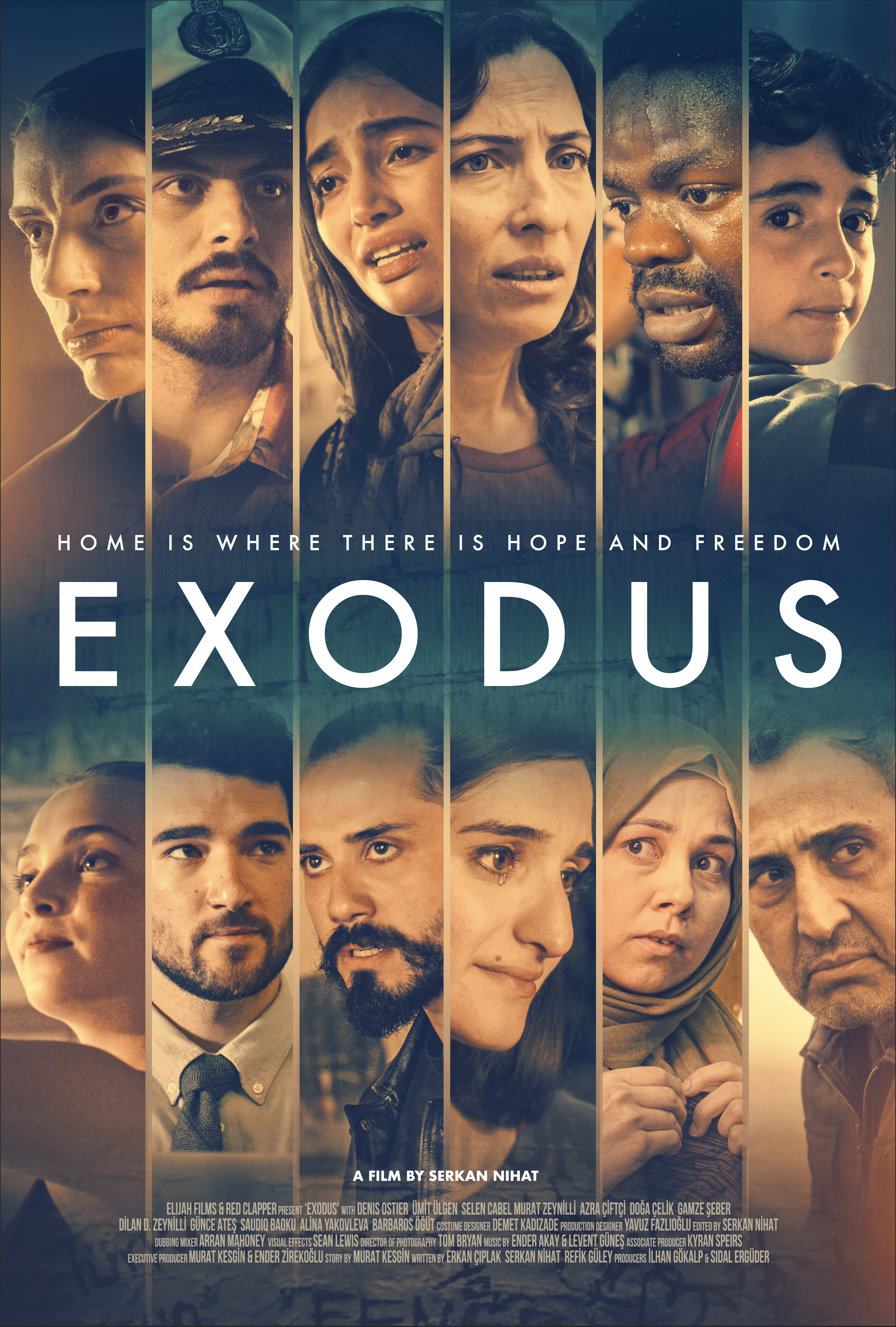
Exodus, an award-winning movie focusing on the stories of a group of people forced to flee Turkey to seek asylum in Europe post 2016 coup attempt.

In 2019, it was reported that Interpol had denied Turkey's appeals of the rejection of Turkey's red notice requests regarding 464 fugitives. The decision cited Interpol's definition of the 2016 coup d'état attempt as a failed military putsch rather than an act of terrorism. Finland and Sweden, which applied for NATO membership in response to Russia's invasion of Ukraine in May 2022, rejected Turkey's applications for the extradition of many Gülen movement and PKK members.

==== Attempts to extradite Gülen ====
Despite Turkey's official request, the United States never extradited Gülen.

==== Extradition of the leadership ====
As of 2020, Turkey had successfully pressured a number of countries, especially those in Africa and the former Soviet Union, to extradite over 80 alleged Gülenists to Turkey. On the contrary democratic countries like USA, UK, Germany, Sweden rejected Turkey's requests to extradite the movement members. Amnesty International criticised extraditions from Moldova in 2018.

Some Gülenists abroad have been kidnapped, allegedly by the MİT (Turkish Intelligence Service), and brought to Turkey. Multiple Turkish officials have confirmed that Turkey has been involved in more than 100 international abductions. 68 of these abductions are publicly known. The number of abductions and the countries are: Azerbaijan (8), Bahrain (1), Bulgaria (1), Gabon (3), Indonesia (1), Kazakhstan (2), Kenya (1), Kosovo (6), Kyrgyzstan (1), Lebanon (1), Malaysia (11), Moldova (7), Myanmar (1), Pakistan (4), Saudi Arabia (16), Sudan (1), Ukraine (3).

Among Turkish citizens within Turkey that have been convicted for membership in the Gülen movement are Turkey's honorary president of Amnesty International, Taner Kilic, and Amnesty's Turkish branch, Idil Eser, who were convicted in July 2020. The editor of Cumhuriyet (a well known secularist newspaper), Can Dündar, was sentenced in absentia in December 2020 to 8 years and 9 months for aiding FETÖ (while not being a member) in the MİT trucks scandal.

In June 2021, the Turkish-Kyrgyz educator and head of the Sapat educational network in Kyrgyzstan, Orhan Inandi, went missing from Bishkek, leading to mass protests. Inandi, who holds dual Turkish-Kyrgyz citizenship, had been living in Kyrgyzstan since 1995. One month later, Turkish President Erdoğan said on July 5 that Turkish intelligence agents had abducted Inandi and accused him of being "a top Central Asian leader" of the Gülen movement. Kyrgyz officials have denied claims they colluded with Turkish intelligence in the abduction.

==== Designation as a terrorist group ====
Gülen movement is a designated terrorist group according to the following countries and international organizations:

- Turkey, since May 2016
- Gulf Cooperation Council, since October 2016
- Organization of Islamic Cooperation, since October 2016
- Pakistan, since December 2018

Northern Cyprus, a government recognised only by Turkey and considered by the international community to be part of the Republic of Cyprus, also designated the Gülen movement as a terrorist organisation in July 2016.

In 2017, according to the Foreign and Commonwealth Office and the British Parliament's Foreign Affairs Select Committee there was no "evidence to justify the designation of the Gülenists as a terrorist organisation by the UK". The same year, Gilles de Kerchove, the EU Counter-terrorism Coordinator, said that the European Union didn't see the Gülen movement as a terrorist organisation and that the EU would need "substantive" evidence to change its stance. In 2018, in a conference with Turkish President Erdoğan, German Chancellor Angela Merkel said that Germany needed more evidence to classify the Gülen movement as a terrorist organisation. The Gülen movement was included in the declaration in the trilateral memorandum signed by Turkey, Finland and Sweden during the NATO summit in Madrid on 28 June 2022, but it was not defined as a terrorist organisation.

In a 2015 interview with Zaman newspaper, Hikmet Çetinkaya, a long-time secularist journalist for Cumhuriyet newspaper and a critic of Gülen, said he had been investigating the movement since 40 years and faced 170 lawsuits by Gülen. Despite decades of scrutiny, he stated that he never described Gülen or the Gülen movement as a terrorist organization and cannot do so, as he is someone to defend human rights, justice and democracy.

=== Assassination of the Russian Ambassador Andrei Karlov ===
Following the assassination of the Russian Ambassador to Ankara, Andrey Karlov, the Turkish government was reportedly investigating the assassin's links to the "Gülenist Terrorist Organisation" (FETÖ). In a speech, Turkish President Erdoğan said that the perpetrator was a member of FETÖ.

In contrast, Russian officials have accused the shooter of aiming to damage Russia–Turkey relations which had been normalising since the 2016 Turkish coup d'état attempt. Gülen described the killing as a "heinous act of terror" that pointed to a deterioration of security in Turkey.

One of the suspects in the December 2016 murder of Russian Ambassador to Turkey Andrei Karlov on Friday denied links to the faith-based Gülen movement and instead said he was affiliated with the Menzil Community sect in Turkey. One of 28 suspects in the case, police officer Hasan Tunç, who was friends with the assassin, said he is connected to the Menzil Community sect.

=== Professional associations ===
While being both praised and criticised for being market friendly, the Gülen movement has established various professional associations and business networks. Among them Istanbul based TUSKON is the major non-profit business confederation which aims to promote economic solutions as well as social and political ones. Another one called TUCSIAD is based in China, in addition to DTIK's Asia-Pacific Group which supports the Gülen movement outside of Turkey in China, hoping to influence Turkish politics from the outside.

== Popular culture ==
- A documentary movie "Love Is a Verb" was made in 2014 about the Gülen movement

== Timeline ==
- 1941 - Gülen was born in the village of Korucuk in the Pasinler district of Erzurum, Turkey.
- 1950s - Gülen's first meeting with people from the Nur movement.
- 1959 - Gülen becomes a licensed imam of the government.
- 1960 - Death of Said Nursî.
- 1966 - Gülen is appointed as an imam to İzmir province, where he established a network of boarding houses known as ışık evleri (“lighthouses”) that assisted students with their education.
- 1972 - Gülen was posted in Manisa where he began the first university preparatory courses in an attempt to prepare ordinary Turkish children for higher education.
- 1975 - The first student dormitory was established in İzmir with the donations of Gülen supporters, which was entirely free.
- 1979 - Science journal Sızıntı begins publication.
- 1982 - The first "Gülen school" opens in Turkey, it's a secular school.
- 1986 - Zaman, a daily newspaper in Turkey, begins publication, later becoming one of Turkey's top selling newspapers.
- 1992 - Gülen-inspired businessmen and teachers opened the first international schools in Azerbaijan and Kazakhstan.
- 1993 - The movement opens its first TV channel in Turkey, Samanyolu TV.
- 1993 - Salih Adem, a student from a Gülen-affiliated school, won the first-ever gold medal for Turkey in the International Physics Olympiad and appeared on the cover of the popular science magazine Bilim ve Teknik.
- 1993 - Turgut Özal, then President of Turkey, who had openly acknowledged his Kurdish roots and proposed potential resolutions to the PKK conflict, visited Hizmet schools during his official trips to Central Asian countries and expressed his support for them. He was assassinated just after the trip.
- 1994 - Dozens of Gülen inspired schools opened in Kazakhstan and Kyrgyzstan.
- 1994 - The first university (Fatih University) is established in Istanbul.
- 1994 - The (Turkish) Journalists and Writers Foundation (Gazeteciler ve Yazarlar Vakfı) established, with Gülen as honorary president. Abant Platform Meetings starts which brings Turkish citizens of diverse intellectual and religious backgrounds, including Muslims, secularists, traditionalists, atheists, Christians, leftists, modernists and conservatives, to discuss and debate common positions on key contemporary issues.
- 1996 - The movement opens "Asya Finans", an interest-free bank.
- 1998 - Gülen meets with Pope John Paul II in the Vatican to promote interfaith dialogue.
- 1999 - Gülen went to the United States because of the accusations in Turkey and his health problems.
- 2000 - At the World Economic Forum in Davos in 2000, Prime Minister Bülent Ecevit (a well known leftist) recognised in his speech the importance of Gülen-inspired schools all over the world, and how these schools contribute to the cultures and well-being of Turkey and other countries.
- 2001 - The next day of September 11, Gülen ran a full page statement on The New York Times condemning the terrorist attack and stating that the perpetrators are not the representatives of Islam. He stated: "A terrorist cannot be a Muslim, nor can a true Muslim be a terrorist."
- 2004 - The first Gülen inspired hospital is established in Istanbul.
- 2004 - Establishment of Niagara Foundation.
- 2004 - Establishment of Kimse Yok Mu (Is Anybody There?), a charitable organisation; 2010, receives "special" NGO status with United Nations Department of Economic and Social Affairs.
- 2004 - A television channel opened in Turkey, Kanaltürk.
- 2005 - Establishment of TUSKON (Turkish Confederation of Businessmen and Industrialists).
- 2006 - A cultural television channel was opened in Turkey, Mehtap TV.
- 2007 - A news channel was opened in Turkey, Samanyolu Haber TV.
- 2008 - Followers of Gülen distributed meat to around 60,000 families during the Eid al-Fitr, and doctors who follow Gülen offered free check-ups and treatment in Kurdish regions, conveying the message that Kurds and Turks are brothers in Islam.
- 2008 - A study emphasized the effectiveness of the Gülen Movement's non-political approaches to ethnic conflict, suggesting that its educational and community building efforts have helped reduce terrorist recruitment by the PKK and Hizbullah among youth in Mardin, a Kurdish majority city in Turkey.
- 2009 - More than 50 Gülen inspired schools are active in Europe, primarily in Germany.
- 2010 - Gülen-inspired schools have expanded to over 1,000 in more than 100 countries across five continents.
- 2010 - The first private Kurdish language TV channel in Turkey, "Dünya TV", launched by the Gülen movement.
- 2011 - Two supporters of the movement were elected as AKP MPs, which lasted until 2013, when Erdoğan began targeting the movement using the full power of the government.
- 2012 - Erdoğan called on Gülen to return to Turkey, but Gülen did not take up the invitation.
- 2012 - Journalists and Writers Foundation receives "general consultative status" as a Non-Governmental Organization of the Economic and Social Council (ECOSOC) of the United Nations.
- 2013 - 2013 corruption scandal erupts, leading to the resignation of four ministers from Erdoğan's cabinet. Erdoğan blames allegedly Gülen affiliated cops and starts purging hundreds of Police officers linked to the movement. The relationship between the Gülen movement and the Turkish government deteriorates.
- 2015 - Global Gülen movement members estimated to be 3-6 million. The global number of schools estimated to be 2000 including 1000 in Turkey and 1000 in other countries.
- 2016 - In May, Gülen movement was declared a terrorist organisation by the Turkish government.
- 2016 - On July 15, a failed coup attempt takes place; the same night, Erdoğan blames the Gülen movement and by the following morning he purges 2,745 judges and thousands of government officials over alleged ties to the movement. Over 150,000 government officials were fired and over 50,000 arrested in the first months after the coup attempt. Over 12 billion $ worth property linked to Gülen movement were seized by the Turkish government. 1,043 private schools, 1,229 charities and foundations, 19 trade unions, 15 universities and 35 medical institutions affiliated with the movement shut down by the Erdoğan government on 23 July.
- 2016 - 15 universities were ordered to close because of alleged ties to Gülen movement. Erdoğan starts pressuring African countries to close Gülen schools.
- 2018 - The number of closed nongovernmental organisations by Turkish government for alleged ties to the Gülen movement exceeds 1500.
- 2019 - The number of citizens detained for alleged links to the Gülen movement exceeded 500,000.
- 2024 - Gülen dies in Pennsylvania after previously being treated in a hospital. 20,000 attend his funeral in a stadium in NJ. A month later Alliance for Shared Values, a NY based Gülen movement non-profit stated its commitment to "consultative decision‑making, localisation, pluralism, and the continuation of its core values, including education, dialogue, and humanitarian aid".
