= Samanyolu TV =

Samanyolu Televizyonu (STV)
- Country: Turkey
- Broadcast area: Turkey and International
- Headquarters: Çamlıca, Üsküdar, Istanbul

Programming
- Language: Turkish
- Picture format: 4:3 (576i, SDTV)

Ownership
- Owner: Samanyolu Yayıncılık A.Ş.

History
- Launched: January 13, 1993
- Closed: April 30, 2016

Links
- Website: samanyolu.tv t.me/samanyolu_tv

Samanyolu TV was an international Turkish language TV station with its headquarters in Istanbul.

The channel is known for its closeness to Fethullah Gülen, the leader of the Gülen movement. Samanyolu TV was previously owned by Yayıncılık A.Ş. Yayıncılık A.Ş. is a media company that operates radio and television broadcasting, publication and distribution of newspapers. The first satellite service for Samanyolu TV was aired towards Central Asia. Samanyolu TV proceeded into North America by 1999, with Türksat as its new mainstream satellite operator. Samanyolu TV later created two official websites for people of Turkish origin, both North American audiences, and Turkish audiences. The two websites also included online streaming (Canlı Yayın) and social networks such as Twitter, Facebook, and YouTube in 2005–2013.

== Naming and influences ==
Samanyolu TV is generally assumed to have adopted the name (meaning "Milky Way" in English) with religious connotations. In essence Milky Way peddles the notion of an "other" universe aside from the present world. One may see that the title of the television station plays an important role for the list of programs it airs for its audiences. Samanyolu TV contains several BBC programs that have heavy emphasis on culture, politics, and utmost religion. Samanyolu TV was funded by many individuals and companies, but the most constructive contribution was from by Fethullah Gülen. Gülen was a well-known Turkish Muslim preacher, scholar and author. Gülen lived in exile in the United States, due to the formation of the Gülen movement which has received much controversy and criticism in Turkey.

== History ==
On 11 January 2000, STV Xazar started broadcasting as an international simulcast feed for Azerbaijan.

On 18 September 2014, Samanyolu TV merged into the 16:9 HD and SD format in conjunction with Show TV and Star TV switching frequencies from Türksat 4A.

In June 2015, Samanyolu Yayıncılık A.Ş. announced that the closure of Samanyolu TV, along with its news channel, Samanyolu Haber, will occur in the early hours of 1 May 2016, due to alleged links with the Gülen movement (and later due to the 2016 Turkish coup d’état attempt). Both channels' licenses will be revoked completely. For that, some employees at Samanyolu TV left. The broadcasting equipment was moved to their homes. Samanyolu TV sold its buildings in Ankara and left its buildings in Çamlıca and rented a studio in Germany.

On 30 April 2016, Samanyolu TV's license was revoked and the channel closed by the Radio and Television Supreme Council due to alleged links with the Gülen movement following the coup d'état attempt. Its HD simulcast continued to operate until 26 July 2016, in which it ceased broadcasting completely.

After the coup d’état attempt, Samanyolu TV will not return as a linear television channel. However, its website, Samanyolu.tv is still available for news.

== Programming ==
Samanyolu TV programs contained controversial content with relation to Islamic teachings and their relation to cultural norms. One of the many examples that implements religious content is the television series Küçük Kiyamet (meaning "The Little Apocalypse" in Turkish).

Samanyolu TV had two policies regarding commercials, one for local viewers in Turkey, where the station was wide open for a range of commercials, and another for North American audiences, where the commercials were limited and the same commercials played repeatedly.

Aside from commercials, Samanyolu TV included a new program entitled Ebru TV designed for English-speaking audiences and open to people of any cultural background. Ebru TV was most popular for individuals residing in Canada and the United States. Samanyolu TV also had an official news program that broadcast locally and internationally to its viewers.

Samanyolu TV included children's programs that are family-friendly, with children's programs such as Caillou on the channel. Furthermore, for all audiences, the channel included shows such as Yeşil Elma (meaning "Green Apple" in Turkish), travel shows such as Ayna ("Mirror"); and also included programs imitating the Discovery Channel, with shows such as Belgesel ("Documentary"); Farklı Desenler ("Different Patterns" in Turkish) was another popular television drama series.

== December 2014 crackdown ==
On 14 December 2014 Turkish police arrested more than two dozen senior journalists and media executives, including Samanyolu TV General Manager Hidayet Karaca on charges of "forming, leading and being a member of an armed terrorist organization." The arrested are people associated with the Gülen movement. The Turkish government accused the movement of infiltrating the police and judiciary.

A statement by the US State Department cautioned Turkey not to violate its "own democratic foundations" while drawing attention to raids against media outlets "openly critical of the current Turkish government."

EU foreign affairs chief Federica Mogherini and EU Enlargement Commissioner Johannes Hahn said that the arrests went "against European values" and "are incompatible with the freedom of media, which is a core principle of democracy".
