= The Fountain (magazine) =

Scientific magazine

- The Fountain May–June 2009
- Editor-in-chief: Hakan Yesilova
- Categories: Science journalism
- Frequency: Bimonthly
- Publisher: Blue Dome, Inc.
- Total circulation: 32,000 (2009)
- Founded: 1993
- First issue: January 1993
- Country: US
- Based in: Clifton, New Jersey
- Language: English
- Website: www.fountainmagazine.com
- ISSN: 0967-9928

The Fountain is a bi-monthly magazine of scientific and spiritual thought published by Blue Dome, Inc. As the English-language version of Sızıntı, it has been published since 1993 as a quarterly magazine till 2008. The Fountain is located in New Jersey. The magazine is controlled by the Hizmet Movement.

The Fountain covers a wide range of topics including interfaith dialogue, science, technology, arts, culture and society from a faith perspective (especially Islam).
