= Turkey's media purge after the failed July 2016 coup d'état =

Turkey's media purge
- Date: 16 July 2016–present
- Location: Turkey
- Type: Shutdown of media and journalists arrests
- Theme: Freedom of Press
- Cause: Alleged pro-coupists
- Organised by: 65th government of the Republic of Turkey and loyal state institutions
- Arrests: 117 journalists
- Convicted: 35 journalists
- Charges: Membership in a terror group (Gülen movement)
- Publication bans: 131 media outlets

A media purge occurred in Turkey after a failed coup d'état on July 15, 2016 and resulted in the shutdown of at least 131 media outlets and the arrest of 117 journalists – at least 35 of whom have been indicted for "membership in a terror group".

In the wake of the attempted putsch, President Recep Tayyip Erdogan's government closed down media companies linked to exiled cleric Fethullah Gülen and his Hizmet Movement. Turkey's General Directorate for Press, Broadcasting, and Information also revoked at least 620 journalists' accreditations.

As a result of the crackdown, 2,308 media workers and journalists have lost their job. Turkey's media purge has also occurred online: regulators blocked at least 30 news-related websites. Websites not linked to Gülen's movement, such as Wikileaks and the Turkish satirical weekly Leman, are among those blocked inside Turkey. In addition 48 online news stories from outlets including The Independent have been censored. Three stories were about corruptions allegations involving the president's son Bilal Erdogan. Wikipedia was blocked from April 2017 to January 2020.

== Chronology of Purge ==
On Thursday July 21, six days after the failed coup d’état, Turkey’s parliament approved a bill declaring a state of emergency allowing the government to rule by decree for three months. On the same day, Erdogan announced that the European Convention on Human Rights had been suspended. The Council of Europe Commissioner for Human Rights expressed concerns over these measures, highlighting risks to ECHR protections such as fair trial rights under suspended provisions and urging restoration of Strasbourg Court oversight amid KHK-related cases.

Under the Turkish constitution, during a state of emergency, the government can overturn the exercise of fundamental rights and freedoms, as long as it respects international laws. However, the 15th article of the Turkish Constitution states that the ECHR cannot be suspended.

In this context and that of a wider purge in Turkey with 40,000 arrests and 160,000 suspensions of officials, President Erdogan initiated a purge of media and journalists suspected of sympathy with the Gülen movement. On July 27, Erdogan published a decree in Turkey's official government gazette, ordering the shutdown of three news agencies, 16 TV channels, 23 radio channels, 45 newspapers, 15 magazines and 29 publishing houses (see list below).

By the force of the state of emergency, "all goods, assets, rights, documents and papers [belonging to those media outlets] will be transferred, free of charge, to Turkish treasury with no appeal to be made". Also, 89 arrest warrants were issued for journalists who were alleged plotters in the failed attempt to overthrow the government.

During the same week, 17 journalists were charged with membership in Gülen’s movement, which the government considers a terrorist group. On August 5, this number increased to 36 journalists indicted for the same charge. The Turkish government justified the arrests for security reasons and said the journalists were being investigated and prosecuted for participating in criminal activities. On August 27, the Platform for Independent Journalism (P24), a press freedom group, said the number of journalists arrested since the coup was 108.

== Reactions ==
Press freedom groups have condemned the crackdown. The Turkish representative for Reporters Without Borders called the arrests "a witch hunt against journalists". David Kaye, the UN special rapporteur on the right to freedom of expression said that "the attempted coup cannot justify such a broad attack against almost all voices, not just critical ones but analytic and journalistic."

"The disregard for any assurance of due process is flagrant and only contributes to the extreme levels of insecurity affecting all those working to inform people of the ongoing crisis in the country," said Dunja Mijatović, the media freedom representative of the Organisation for Security and Cooperation in Europe's representative on media freedom.

The Committee to Protect Journalist's program coordinator for central Asia, Nina Ognianova, said that the "scale of this rout of the media is staggering." She added: "The government is exploiting a failed coup to silence the critical press when Turkey most needs pluralistic media."

The Turkey director at Human Rights Watch, Emma Sinclair-Webb, added to the criticism "In the absence of any evidence of their role or participation in the violent attempt to overthrow the government, we strongly condemn this accelerated assault on the media, which further undermines Turkey’s democratic credentials", she said.

== Appendices ==
=== Names of the 50 journalists or media workers indicted between July 18 and September 22 ===
(Most are charged for membership to Gulen’s movement, some for being pro-PKK)

- Mümtaz'er Türköne, a former columnist for the shuttered newspaper Zaman and its sister, English-language publication Today's Zaman, who stands accused of "serving the goals" of the Hizmet movement
- Alaattin Güner faces charges of "membership in an armed terrorist organization"
- Şeref Yılmaz, vice-chair of the broadcaster Irmak TV's board of directors, faces charges of "membership in an armed terrorist organization"
- Ahmet Metin Sekizkardeş, vice-president of Cihan Media, faces charges of "membership in an armed terrorist organization"
- Faruk Akkan, news editor for Cihan News Agency, faces charges of "membership in an armed terrorist organization"
- Mehmet Özdemir faces charges of "membership in an armed terrorist organization"
- Fevzi Yazıcı, a former design editor for Zaman and a columnist for the daily Yarına Bakış, faces charges of "membership in an armed terrorist organization"
- Zafer Özsoy faces charges of "membership in an armed terrorist organization"
- Cuma Kayaand faces charges of "membership in an armed terrorist organization"
- Hakan Taşdelen faces charges of "membership in an armed terrorist organization"
- Hüseyin Turan, a shareholder in the Feza Media Group, faces charges of "aiding a terrorist organization without being a member"
- Murat Avcıoğlu faces charges of "aiding a terrorist organization without being a member"
- Ayşenur Parlak: former Zaman newspaper reporter
- Erdal Şen, former Ankara correspondent for the daily newspaper Habertürk
- Arda Akın, a journalist for the daily newspaper Hürriyet
- Aslı Erdoğan, columnist and a member of the suspended, pro-Kurdish newspaper Özgür Gündem's advisory board
- Bilir Kaya, editor: of Özgür Gündem, the pro-Kurdish newspaper reported on its website
- İnan Kızılkaya, news editor Özgür Gündem
- Ercan Gün former Fox TV news editor
- Erdem Mühirci, a reporter for the pro-Kurdish Dicle News Agency (DİHA)
- Necmiye Alpay, a writer, linguist, and member of the advisory board of the shuttered, pro-Kurdish daily newspaper Özgür Gündem
- Sabahattin Koyuncu, province correspondent for the pro-Kurdish Dicle News Agency (DİHA)
- Arap Turan, pro-Kurdish newspaper Özgür Gündem
- Ferit Toprak, pro-Kurdish newspaper Özgür Gündem
- Mutlu Çölgeçen, columnist for the defunct Meydan newspaper Atilla Taş
- Nazlı Ilıcak. a columnist with the defunct newspaper Özgür Düşünce, and a commentator for the defunct broadcaster Can Erzincan TV
- Seyit Kılıç, a reporter for the state broadcaster TRT
- Bayram Kaya, reporter for the defunct daily newspaper Yeni Hayat
- Cihan Acar, a photojournalist with the defunct daily newspaper Bugün
- Bünyamin Köseli, a reporter for the defunct news magazine Aksiyon
- Emre Soncan, a reporter for the defunct daily Zaman
- Mustafa Erkan Acar, a reporter with the defunct Cihan News Agency
- Cemal Azmi Kalyoncu reporter formerly with the daily newspaper Zaman
- Abdullah Kılıç, formerly with Habertürk TV, and the recently closed daily newspaper Meydan
- Habip Güler, a former reporter for Zaman
- Cuma Ulus, a former coordinator of the defunct daily newspaper Millet
- Hanım Büşra Erdal, a former reporter for Zaman, currently with Özgür Düşünce
- Hüseyin Aydın, a former reporter for the Cihan News Agency
- Haşim Söylemez, a reporter formerly with Zaman and Aksiyon
- Ali Akkuş, a former editor of Zaman
- Yakup Çetin, a former reporter for Zaman
- Ufuk Şanlı, a columnist formerly with the daily Vatan, currently with the US-based website Al-Monitor
- Ali Bulaç, from Zaman
- Şahin Alpay, from Zaman
- Ahmet Turan Alkan, from Zaman
- Mustafa Ünal, from Zaman
- Nuriye Ural, from Zaman
- Lalezer Sarıibrahimoğlu (pen name: Lale Kemal), from Zaman
- Levent Kenez, the editor-in-chief of Meydan newspaper
- Abdullah Bozkurt, Today’s Zaman’s New York bureau chief
- Tarık Toros, Bugün TV editor-in-chief
- Metin Yıkar, Samanyolu Haber editör-in-chief
- Erkam Tufan Aytav, Bugün TV presenter

=== 131 media outlets shutdown on Erdogan’s July 27 decree ===
News Agencies

- Cihan Haber Ajansı
- Muhabir Haber Ajansı
- SEM Haber Ajans

TV Channels

- Barış TV
- Bugün TV
- Can Erzincan TV
- Dünya TV
- HİRA TV
- Irmak TV
- Kanal 124
- Kanaltürk
- MC TV
- Mehtap TV
- Samanyolu Haber
- Merkür TV
- Samanyolu TV
- SRT Televizyonu
- Tuna Shopping TV
- Yumurcak TV

Radio Stations

- Aksaray Mavi Radyo
- Aktüel Radyo
- Berfin FM
- Burç FM
- Cihan Radyo
- Dünya Radyo
- Esra Radyo
- Haber Radyo Ege
- Herkül FM
- Jest FM 1
- Kanaltürk Radyo
- Radyo
- Radyo Aile Rehberi
- Radyo Bamteli
- Radyo Cihan
- Radyo Fıkıh
- Radyo Küre
- Radyo Mehtap
- Radyo Nur
- Radyo Şemşik
- Samanyolu Haber Radyosu
- Umut FM
- Yağmur FM

Newspapers (local)

- Adana Haber Gazetesi
- Adana Medya Gazetesi
- Akdeniz Türk
- Şuhut'un Sesi Gazetesi
- Kurtuluş Gazetesi
- Lider Gazetesi
- İscehisar Durum Gazetesi
- Türkeli Gazetesi
- Antalya Gazetesi
- Yerel Bakış Gazetesi
- Nazar
- Batman Gazetesi
- Batman Postası Gazetesi
- Batman Doğuş Gazetesi
- Bingöl Olay Gazetesi
- İrade Gazetesi
- İskenderun Olay Gazetesi
- Ekonomi
- Ege'de Son Söz Gazetesi
- Demokrat Gebze
- Kocaeli Manşet
- Bizim Kocaeli
- Haber Kütahya Gazetesi
- Gediz Gazetesi
- Zafer Gazetesi
- Hisar Gazetesi
- Turgutlu Havadis Gazetesi
- Milas Feza Gazetesi
- Türkiye'de Yeni Yıldız Gazetesi
- Hakikat Gazetesi
- Urfa Haber Ajansı Gazetesi
- Ajans
- Gazetesi
- Yeni Emek
- Banaz Postası Gazetesi
- Son Nokta Gazetesi
- Merkür Haber Gazetesi

Newspapers (national)

- Millet Gazetesi
- Bugün Gazetesi
- Meydan Gazetesi
- Özgür Düşünce Gazetesi
- Taraf
- Yarına Bakış
- Yeni Hayat
- Zaman Gazetesi
- Today's Zaman

Magazines

- Akademik Araştırmalar Dergisi
- Aksiyon
- Asya Pasifik Dergisi
- Bisiklet Çocuk Dergisi
- Diyalog Avrasya Dergisi
- Ekolife Dergisi
- Ekoloji Dergisi
- Fountain Dergisi
- Gonca Dergisi
- Gül Yaprağı Dergisi
- Nokta
- Sızıntı
- Yağmur Dergisi
- Yeni Ümit
- Zirve Dergisi

Publishing Houses and Distribution Companies

- Altınburç Yayınları
- Burak Basın Yayın Dağıtım
- Define Yayınları
- Dolunay Eğitim Yayın Dağıtım
- Giresun Basın Yayın Dağıtım
- Gonca Yayınları
- Gülyurdu Yayınları
- GYV Yayınları
- Işık Akademi
- Işık Özel Eğitim Yayınlar
- Işık Yayınları
- İklim Basın Yayın Pazarlama
- Kaydırak Yayınları
- Kaynak Kültür Yayın Grubu (Note: Not to be confused with Kaynak Yayınları.)
- Kervan Basın Yayıncılık
- Kuşak Yayınları
- Muştu Yayınları
- Nil Yayınları
- Rehber Yayınları
- Sürat Basım Yayın Reklamcılık Eğitim Araçları
- Sütun Yayınları
- Şahdamar Yayınları
- Ufuk Basın Yayın Haber Ajans Pazarlama
- Ufuk Yayınları
- Waşanxaneya Nil
- Yay Basın Dağıtım
- Yeni Akademi Yayınları
- Yitik Hazine Yayınları
- Zambak Basın Yayın Eğitim Turizm

== See also ==
- 2016–present purges in Turkey
- Human rights in Turkey
