= Abdullah Bozkurt =

Turkish journalist (born 1971)

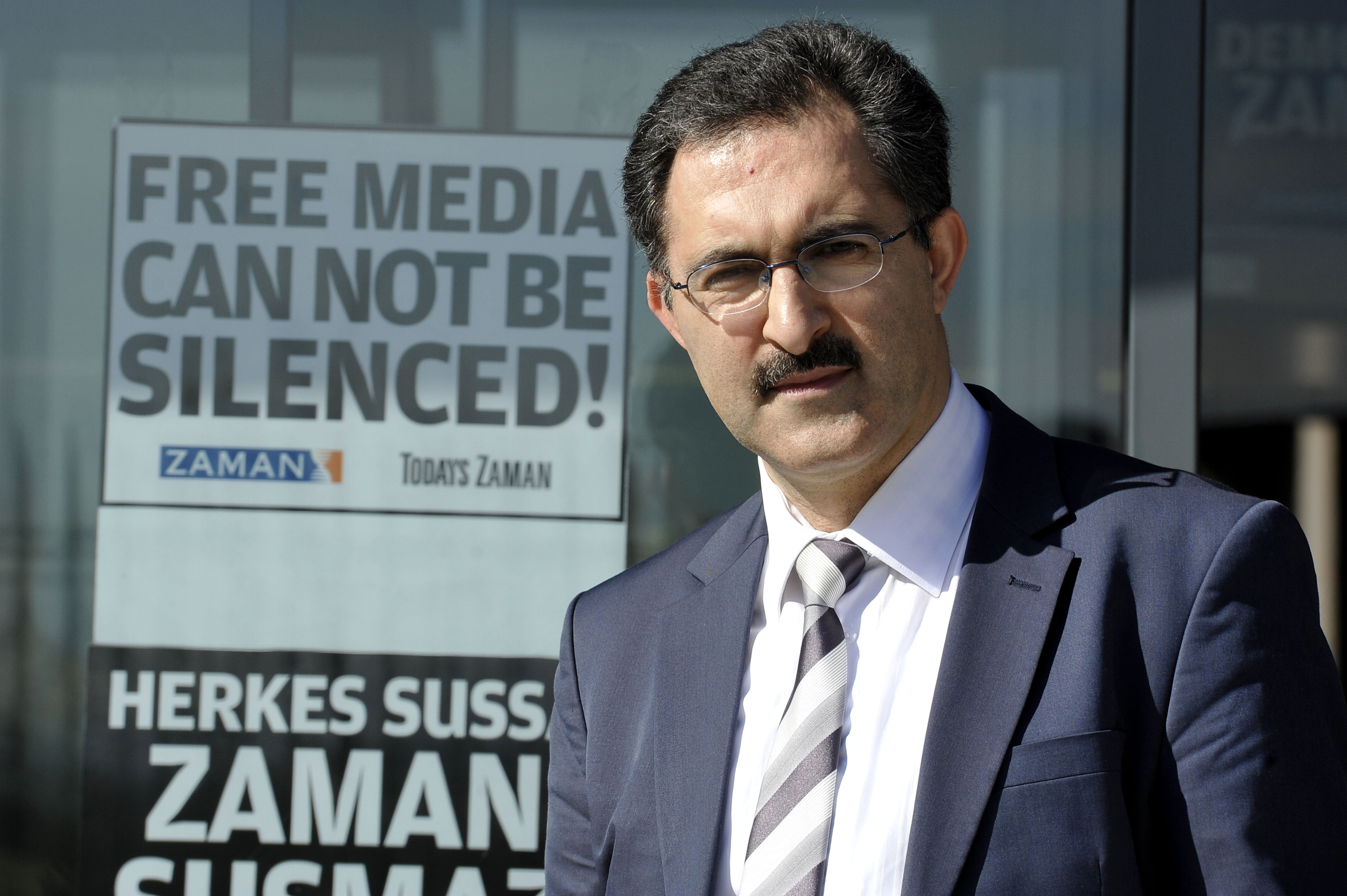
- Bozkurt in 2016
- Born: 5 August 1971 (age 54); Balıkesir, Turkey
- Citizenship: Turkish
- Education: Boğaziçi University, Columbia University
- Occupations: Journalist, editor
- Organization: Swedish Union of Journalists(Journalistförbundet)

Abdullah Bozkurt (born 5 August 1971 in Balıkesir, Turkey) is a Turkish journalist and the director of the Nordic Research & Monitoring Network (Nordic Monitor). He resides in Sweden and has three children.

== Early life and education ==
Bozkurt was born in 1971 in Balıkesir, Turkey. He studied at Boğaziçi University and later attended Columbia University. His education provided the foundation for a journalism career spanning more than two decades.

== Career ==
Bozkurt began his career at the Turkish daily Zaman, where he served as New York bureau chief and Washington correspondent. He later held similar roles at Today’s Zaman, the newspaper’s English-language edition, until both publications were seized by the Turkish government in March 2016. He subsequently founded the Muhabir News Agency, which was also shut down following government action. Amid escalating media repression following the 2016 coup attempt, he relocated to Sweden.

In Sweden, Bozkurt established the Stockholm Center for Freedom (SCF) in 2017, serving as its president and focusing on human rights and press freedom developments in Turkey. In 2019, he co-founded the Nordic Research & Monitoring Network (Nordic Monitor) with journalist Levent Kenez to report on terrorism, extremism, security issues, and Turkish intelligence activities. He is also a Writing Fellow at the U.S.-based Middle East Forum, the author of Turkey Interrupted: Derailing Democracy (2015), and a contributor to international media outlets on topics relating to transnational repression.

He is a member of the Swedish Union of Journalists (Journalistförbundet).

== Legal issues and threats ==
Turkish authorities have issued multiple arrest warrants for Bozkurt in connection with his reporting. Charges include defamation of the president, disclosure of confidential information, and insulting state institutions such as the Security General Directorate (Emniyet), the General Staff, and the judiciary. He also faces a terrorism-related warrant based on alleged links to the Gülen movement which the Turkish government designates as a terrorist organization; such charges are frequently used against dissident journalists in Turkey. Since relocating to Sweden, Bozkurt has reported numerous threats, including during Sweden’s NATO accession process, when Turkish officials publicly tied their approval to extraditions of exiled journalists. During a hearing before the Turkish parliament’s Foreign Affairs Committee, a deputy foreign minister stated that Ankara had requested Sweden to shut down Nordic Monitor as part of its conditions for approving Sweden’s NATO bid. The European Federation of Journalists (EFJ) condemned the Turkish government’s demand and urged Sweden to resist political pressure from Ankara.

In June 2020, the Turkish broadcaster TGRT Haber aired a segment calling for Bozkurt’s “extermination” by Turkey’s National Intelligence Organization (MİT). In September 2020, he was assaulted outside his home in Stockholm. Following the attack, Bozkurt told Journalisten that he was shaken by the incident and heartbroken seeing his children's reaction, but vowed to continue his work: "I have been working as a journalist for more than 20 years and I am not going to give in to pressure or violence. I cannot stop writing, because if I stop, they have won." The Committee to Protect Journalists (CPJ and the International Federation of Journalists (IFJ) linked the attack to hostile coverage in pro-government Turkish media.

In May 2024, Turkey submitted arrest and extradition requests to Sweden on five criminal charges against Bozkurt. On 29 October 2025, Sweden’s Supreme Court ruled that the offenses were not extraditable under Swedish law and stated that Turkey’s allegations were based on Bozkurt’s journalistic activities. The Ministry of Justice formally rejected the requests on 13 November 2025.

== Press freedom and surveillance ==
Bozkurt has reported being subject to surveillance and harassment by the Turkish National Intelligence Organization (MİT), part of a broader pattern of pressure on exiled journalists. As of 2025, numerous journalists remained imprisoned in Turkey amid intensifying media crackdowns and widespread investigations, with the country continuing to rank near the bottom in global press freedom indices.

== See also ==
- Gülen movement
- Turkey's media purge after the failed July 2016 coup d'état
- Stockholm Center for Freedom (SCF)
