= Aydoğan Vatandaş =

Turkish investigative journalist and author

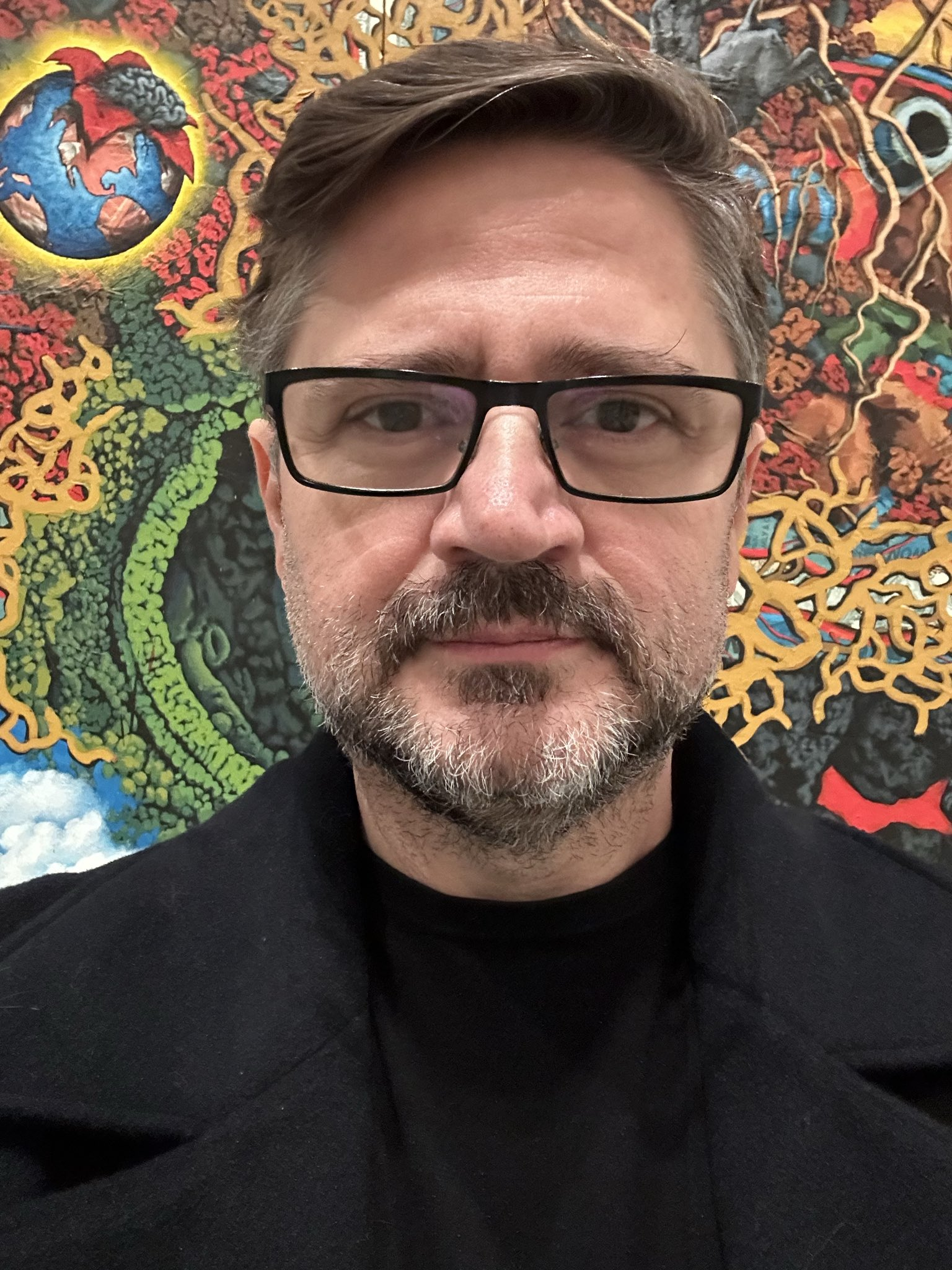
- Vatandaş in 2026
- Born: 1974 (age 51–52); Istanbul, Turkey
- Citizenship: Turkish
- Education: Deniz Lisesi (1988); Turkish Naval Academy (1993–1995); Fatih University (BA English Literature, 2001); Yeditepe University (MA Social Anthropology, 2003–2005); The New School (MA Media Studies, 2009–2011); Alvernia University (PhD Corporate Leadership, 2013–2017)
- Occupations: Investigative journalist, author, TV host, editor-in-chief
- Years active: 1995–present
- Employer(s): Aksiyon (1995–2000); Zaman (2000–2004); Today's Zaman (2006–2016); HuffPost contributor Politurco.com (founder/editor-in-chief)
- Notable work: Armagedon: Türkiye-İsrail Gizli Savaşı (1996); Hungry for Power (2015)
- Website: politurco.com

Aydoğan Vatandaş (born 1974, in Istanbul, Turkey) is a Turkish investigative journalist, author, and media executive based in the United States. He founded Politurco.com and has authored 13 books on Turkish politics and international relations, including English works Reporting from the Bridge (2012) and Hungry for Power (2015).

== Early life and education ==
Born in Istanbul in 1974, Vatandaş graduated from prestigious Deniz Lisesi naval high school in 1988. He attended the Turkish Naval Academy from 1993 to 1995 before leaving to pursue journalism.

His academic qualifications include:

- BA English Literature, Fatih University (2001)
- MA Social Anthropology, Yeditepe University (2003–2005)
- MA Media Studies, The New School (2009–2011)
- PhD Corporate Leadership, Alvernia University (2013–2017)

== Career ==
Vatandaş began his journalistic career in 1995 as a reporter at Aksiyon magazine, a prominent investigative publication during Turkey's Susurluk scandal and Ergenekon trials era. He advanced to news editor and columnist by 2000. From 2000 to 2004, he worked at Zaman newspaper as reporter, news editor, columnist, and producer-host of the investigative TV program Kara Kutu on Samanyolu TV, focusing on political scandals and security issues. He worked at major Turkish outlets before relocating to New York in 2006 as U.S. correspondent for Today's Zaman until 2016.

In New York, Vatandaş served as U.S. correspondent for Today's Zaman (English edition) and Cihan News Agency until 2016. He covered Turkish-American relations, U.S. politics' impact on Turkey, and events like the 2013 Gezi Park protests.

Following Turkey's 2016 media crackdown, he founded Politurco.com in the U.S., an independent English-Turkish news platform critical of the Turkish government. In 2015, Vatandaş wrote for The Independent about arrests in the Turkish press, highlighting the first wave of pressure against opposition journalists to the international community.

== Controversies and legal status ==
Turkish authorities have alleged that Vatandaş was affiliated with the Gülen movement, which the Turkish government designates as a terrorist organization following the 2016 coup attempt. In 2018, the Turkish government-controlled Anadolu Agency covertly filmed him in the United States and publicly targeted him. Pro-government media outlets like Sabah and Yeni Şafak had already targeted him in 2016 as an exiled journalist linked to this persona, amid broader campaigns against critics abroad.

Vatandaş denies all charges and continues publishing from the United States, where he holds legal residency.

== Works ==
Vatandaş has authored 13 books since 1996 on political investigations, including Turkey–Israel relations, ASALA counterterrorism operations, secret societies, and Turkish political purges. Several became bestsellers in Turkey.

Books by Aydoğan Vatandaş
Title	Publisher	Year	Language	Subject
Armagedon: Türkiye-İsrail Gizli Savaşı	TİMAŞ	1996	Turkish	Turkey-Israel covert conflict and U.S. Middle East policy
HAARP - Kıyamet Teknolojisi	Karakutu	2000	Turkish	HAARP technology investigations
Agharta / Elektromanyetik Savaş Başladı	Karakutu	2001	Turkish	Electromagnetic warfare theories
Apokalipse / Kıyametin Gizli Tarihi	Karakutu	2002	Turkish	Apocalyptic and hidden history research
Ezoterika / Gizli Cemiyetler	Karakutu	2002	Turkish	Secret societies and esotericism
Kod Adı: Kılıçbalığı / 11 Eylül Senaryosu (co-authored with Mustafa Aydın)	Karakutu	2002	Turkish	9/11 scenario analysis
Kuru Kafa Ve Kemik Tarikatının Gizli Tarihi	Q Matrıs	2003	Turkish	Skull and Bones society history
ASALA Operasyonları: Aslında Nasıl Oldu?	Alfa	2005	Turkish	ASALA counterterrorism operations
Barnabas'ın Sırrı	TİMAŞ	2007	Turkish	Aramaic gospel discovery claims
Monşer: Saklı Seçilmişler	TİMAŞ	2009	Turkish	Turkish elite families and state formation
Apokrifal	TİMAŞ	2012	Turkish	Apocryphal texts research
Reporting from the Bridge	Blue Dome Press	2012	English	Turkish-American relations and U.S. interviews
Hungry for Power: Erdoğan's Witch Hunt	Blue Dome Press	2015	English	2013–2016 Turkish purges and authoritarianism
