= Bülent Keneş =

Turkish exiled journalist

- Born: 1969 (age 56–57); Malatya, Turkey
- Citizenship: Turkish
- Education: Boğaziçi University, Marmara University
- Occupations: Journalist, academician
- Years active: 1994-present
- Organization(s): Stockholm Center for Freedom, Swedish Union of Journalists (Journalistförbundet), European Center for Populism Studies(ECPS)

Bülent Keneş (born in Malatya, Turkey in 1969) is a Turkish journalist, currently living in exile in Sweden and working with the Stockholm Center for Freedom. He previously served as editor-in-chief of Today's Zaman.

== Life and education ==
Bülent Keneş was born in 1969 in Malatya, Turkey. He completed his primary, middle, and high school education in Malatya. Keneş earned a bachelor's degree in international relations from Boğaziçi University, a master's degree and PhD from Marmara University.

== Career ==
Bülent Keneş started his professional career at Zaman newspaper in March 1994. After working in various departments, he was appointed Foreign News Director in 1995 and promoted to News Director in 1999. Additionally, he worked as Publishing Coordinator for Turkish Daily News and as New York Bureau Chief for Anadolu Agency. From 2005 to 2006, he served as editor-in-chief of Bugün. In 2007, he joined Today's Zaman as the newly founded English-language newspaper's first editor-in-chief.

In July 2014, Turkish Prime Minister Recep Tayyip Erdoğan filed a legal complaint against Keneş with the Ankara Chief Public Prosecutor's Office, alleging that Keneş had targeted him with a smear campaign.

On 9 October 2015, Keneş was arrested by Turkish police on charges of insulting Erdoğan, now President of Turkey, on Twitter. The Committee to Protect Journalists condemned the arrest as part of a "relentless crackdown on the press" in Turkey.

Following the 2016 Turkish coup d'état attempt, further arrest warrants were issued by Turkish authorities, targeting Keneş and 46 other Zaman employees. When announcing those arrest warrants, the Turkish government claimed that Zaman was the "flagship media organization" of the Gülen movement.

Following Sweden's application for NATO membership in 2022, the Turkish government demanded the extradition of several dozen individuals living in Sweden, including Keneş. In December 2022, the Supreme Court of Sweden blocked the extradition of Keneş, ruling that several of the Turkish charges against him were not crimes under Swedish law and that there was "a risk of persecution based on this person’s political beliefs."

== Books ==
- 1998 - Batı Medyasında İslam İmajı (Islam's Image in Western Media)
- 2012 - İran ve Terör Hasan Sabbah'tan Bugüne (Iran and Terror from Hasan Sabbah to Today)
- 2012 - İran: Tehdit mi, Fırsat mı (Iran: Threat or Opportunity)
- 2013 - İran Siyasetinin İç Yüzü (The Inner Face of Iranian Politics)

== See also ==
- Censorship in Turkey
- Human rights in Turkey
- Transnational repression
