= Özlem Piltanoğlu =

Turkish politician and columnist

Özlem Piltanoğlu (born 9 October 1976, Ankara) is a Turkish columnist and politician of the Justice and Development Party. She was a member of the Grand National Assembly of Turkey (TBMM) and a member of the Parliamentary Assembly of the Council of Europe (PACE) between 2007 and 2011. She has been a columnist for Zaman and Today's Zaman.

== Biography ==
Türköne graduated from Gazi University's Faculty of Economics and Administrative Sciences, graduated from the Department of Public Administration. She completed her master's degree in International Relations at Middlesex University in London.

She worked as a specialist in Turkish Public Procurement Authority. Türköne was the District Governor of Akçakent, Artova, Bayramören, Çiçekdağı, Eldivan and Kurşunlu.

After the general elections of 2007, Türköne became a deputy for Istanbul in the Turkish parliament.

She was married to Mümtaz'er Türköne, a columnist of the daily newspaper Zaman.
