= Erkam Tufan Aytav =

Turkish journalist (born 1966)

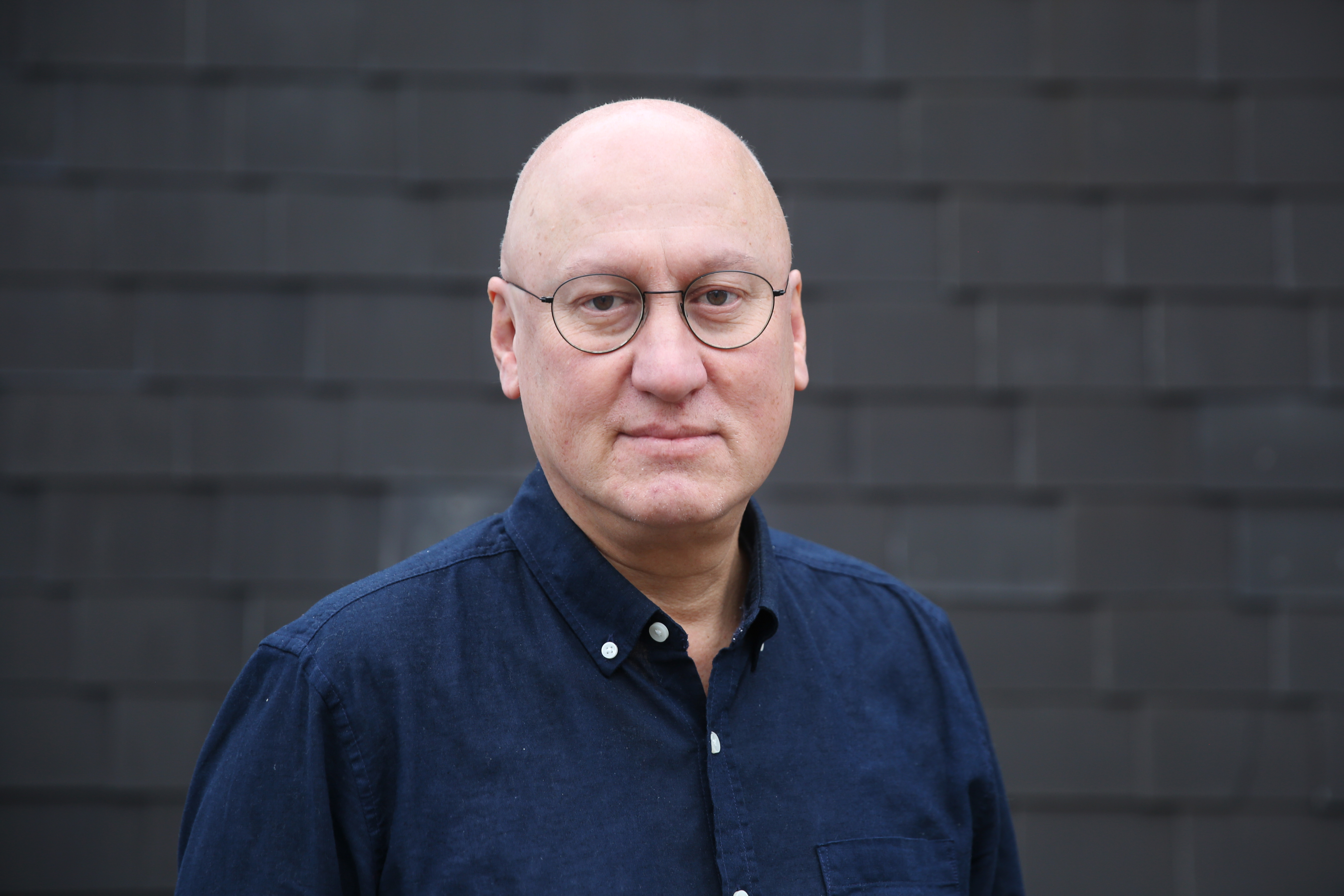
- Erkam Tufan Aytav in 2025
- Born: 1966 (age 59–60); Karşıyaka, İzmir, Turkey
- Citizenship: Turkish
- Education: Istanbul Technical University
- Occupations: Journalist, television presenter, author
- Years active: 1987–present
- Spouse: Married
- Children: 3

Erkam Tufan Aytav (born 1966) is a Turkish journalist, television presenter, author, and YouTube content creator. He hosted programs on TVNET and Bugün TV and authored books on social polarization. Following the 2016 Turkish coup d'état attempt, he relocated to Sweden. He currently resides in Stockholm.

== Life and career ==
Born in 1966 in Karşıyaka, İzmir, Aytav has worked as a journalist since 1987 for various newspapers, including the Zaman, which was closed by the Turkish government in 2016. From 2008 to 2016, he presented Tarih Atlası on Burç FM radio and TVNET, as well as Erkam Tufan'la Analiz on Bugün TV.

He held the following positions in journalistic organizations.

- Gazeteciler ve Yazarlar Vakfı – Deputy Chairman
- Asya Gazeteciler Derneği (AJA) – Turkey Representative
- Medya Etik Konseyi – Board Member and 2011 jury member

== Legal proceedings and exile ==
In May 2015, Aytav was questioned by the Prosecutor's Office of Istanbul regarding an investigation into the Gazeteciler ve Yazarlar Vakfı. Shortly thereafter, Bugün TV, where he worked, was closed as part of the government's media crackdown.

Following the 2016 Turkish coup d'état attempt, a nationwide purge of journalists began. Four days after the attempt, Aytav fled Turkey with his family and sought asylum in Sweden, where he currently resides in Stockholm. In a widely circulated 2020 interview from Stockholm, Aytav declared: "Ülkemi terk etmedim, ülkem beni terk etti" (I didn't abandon my country—my country abandoned me.), encapsulating the sentiment of many Turkish journalists in exile. Aytav stated he is under state protection in Sweden, citing threats of kidnapping and assassination by Turkish authorities.

Aytav's YouTube program Erkam Tufan'la 30 Dakika drew attention from Turkish intelligence, with a 2020 report indicating the Turkish government monitored it due to its critical content.

In March 2022, Turkish police filed criminal charges against Şebnem Korur Fincancı, president of the Turkish Medical Association, solely for appearing on Aytav's YouTube program. The Turkish government designates Aytav as a fugitive terrorist due to his exile status.

As part of his press freedom advocacy, Aytav moderated the International Journalists' Association panel "Free Media for Real Democracy" at the Frankfurt Book Fair in 2022.

Turkish authorities placed Erkam Tufan Aytav on their wanted list and issued an international extradition request as part of investigations into the Gülen movement.

As part of Turkey's government restrictions on social media, the X accounts of numerous exiled journalists, including Erkam Tufan Aytav, have been blocked for access within Turkey.

Aytav currently produces YouTube programs from Stockholm including Sıcak Gündem, Açık ve Net, Mercek, and Manşet Haber. He emphasizes a human rights-oriented approach, supporting the oppressed regardless of ethnicity or religion. He is also a columnist for Bold Medya, a publication based in Europe (Germany).

== Works ==
- Türkiye'de Öteki Olmak (2011, ISBN 978-605-435-115-2)
- Sevdim Seni Bir Kere: Alevi-Sünni Evlilikleri (2012, ISBN 978-605-531-414-9)
- Aydınlık'tan Kaçanlar & Aydınlık'ın Gözüyle Maocu Aydınlık Hareketi (2013, ISBN 978-605-531-455-2)

== See also ==
- Turkey's media purge after the failed July 2016 coup d'état
- Gülen movement
