= Abdülhamit Bilici =

Turkish journalist

- Born: 1970 (age 55–56); Erzurum, Turkey
- Other name: Twitter: @ahamitbilici
- Education: Boğaziçi University
- Occupations: Journalist, Writer

Abdülhamit Bilici (born 1970) is a Turkish journalist and media executive. Bilici was once one of the prominent and influential media figures in Turkey, as the last editor-in-chief of Zaman, the country's most widely circulated newspaper and the CEO of the Feza Publications which ranked 244th among top 500 companies according to Istanbul Chamber of Industry's ISO500. Prior to that, he was the general director of Cihan News Agency, once the nation's second largest news agency and also columnist of both Zaman daily and its English-language version, Today's Zaman. Bilici's newspapers were taken over by Erdogan government with a brutal raid on March 5, 2016, and the Feza Media Group was shut down after July 15, failed coup attempt. In these circumstances, he was forced into exile under the threat of an arrest warrant.

Bilici is an expert on Turkish politics and continues his journalism career by writing freelance articles for various media outlets, lectures at different universities and speaks at conferences related to press freedom and Turkey's domestic and foreign policy. Recently, He has spoken in conferences in more than 20 states in America and is a frequent commentator on television channels such as BBC, CBS, Al Jazeera, and Sky News, among others.

== Life ==
Bilici attending primary school education in Istanbul and graduated from high school in Erzurum. He read for a BA in Political Sciences and International Relations Department at Bosporus University in 1993. He obtained a master's degree from Department of Economics at Istanbul University with a thesis titled “Energy Structure of Turkmenistan and Natural Gas”. He is currently a doctoral student at Department of International Relations at the same university. Bilici also has MBA degree from Faculty of Management at Fatih University.

He speaks English. Bilici is married and has two children.

== Career ==
He started his career at Zaman as a correspondent, Bilici worked as an editor at Aksiyon in 1995–1997. In 1998–2001, he was a foreign news editor at Zaman. In 2002–2008, he was the general editor at Zaman Daily and the general director of Cihan News Agency and the editor-in-chief of the newspaper Zaman Newspaper. He is a columnist for Zaman and Today's Zaman dailies. He writes mainly on Turkish foreign policy and world politics. He is a frequent speaker on local and international television programs. Bilici is the editor of the book "Why Turkey?", which features different perspectives on Turkey-European Union relations.

== Bibliography ==
Bilici edited a book titled “Why Turkey?” which combines different perspectives on Turkey-EU relations from both sides.

Bilici is a member of the Turkish Journalists Association (TGC), Journalists and Writers Foundation (GYV) and World Association of Newspapers (WAN).

== Some of his published articles ==
- How corruption destroys a democracy: The case of Turkey under Erdogan
- Turkey, a U.S. ally, muzzles the media
- « En s’en prenant à mon journal ’Zaman’, Erdogan plonge le pays dans la psychose »
- Bilici: Turkey's Erdogan shows why we must care about press freedom
- Abdulhamit Bilici: how Turkey lost its largest newspaper
- Genes of Turkish media, clichés of the West
- Dutch daily Volkskrant interview Bilici on tension in Turkish politics:
- What if Soma disaster had been in South Korea?
- Turkey's two new impasses
- Normalization with Armenian surrealism?
- Is Turkey detaching itself or is the West excluding it?
- What is the military's place?

== Some of his columns published at Zaman Daily ==
- Soma, Güney Kore’de olsaydı!
- Şimdi Hasan Cemal de New York Times da kötü oldu!
- Dış politika karnesi!
