= İrfan Yılmaz =

- Born: September 24, 1953 (age 73); Karşıyaka, İzmir, Turkey
- Education: Ege University
- Occupations: Zoologist, academic, author
- Employer(s): Ege University; Dokuz Eylül University
- Known for: Research in systematic zoology and biology education; magazine writing
- Notable work: Yitik Hazinenin Kâşifi: Fuat Sezgin; Hayatın İhtişamı Karşısında Evrimin Âcizliği
- Title: Professor

İrfan Yılmaz (born September 24, 1953, in Karşıyaka, İzmir) is a Turkish zoologist, academic, and author. His academic work focused primarily on systematic zoology and biology education. He spent much of his academic career at the Buca Faculty of Education at Dokuz Eylül University. He was a founding member of the editorial board of Sızıntı magazine and later served as its editor-in-chief. His articles were also published in Çağlayan magazine.

== Life and education ==
İrfan Yılmaz was born on September 24, 1953, in the Karşıyaka district of İzmir. He completed his primary and secondary education in İzmir. In 1971, he enrolled in the Department of Zoology and Botany at the Faculty of Science at Ege University, graduating in 1975. He subsequently pursued master's and doctoral studies in systematic zoology at the same university. His doctoral research focused on the systematics of reptiles and amphibians.

== Career ==
Yılmaz began his academic career in 1976 as a research assistant in the Department of Zoology at the Faculty of Science, Ege University, where he worked in the field of systematic zoology. He remained at the university until 1984.

In 1984, he joined the Buca Faculty of Education at Dokuz Eylül University. He later became an assistant professor and associate professor before being appointed professor. He continued his academic career at Dokuz Eylül University until 2016.

His research covered systematic zoology and biology education, as well as vertebrate zoology, the history and philosophy of biology, taxonomy, anatomy, and animal physiology.

Yılmaz is reported to have published more than 500 articles. His work has appeared over the years in publications in Turkish, German, English, Russian, Spanish, French, Arabic, and Indonesian.

== Magazine work ==
Yılmaz was a member of the founding editorial board of Sızıntı, which began publication in 1979. During the magazine's early years, he worked alongside figures including Abdullah Aymaz, Kudret Ünal, Mehmet Atalay, Zafer Ayvaz, İsa Saraç, and Şerafettin Kocaman.

He later became editor-in-chief of Sızıntı and contributed articles on biology, zoology, nature, and living organisms.

Yılmaz later contributed to Çağlayan, writing on subjects including biology, animals, human anatomy, nature, and science.

His articles in Çağlayan included The Journey of a Bite, Are Algorithms in the Brain?, The Nose and Ablution, Were Neanderthals Cave Men?, and The Mathematics of Bird Eggs.

== Television work ==
Alongside his academic career, Yılmaz worked in television, producing and presenting programs for Mehtap TV and Samanyolu TV. His programs included The Book of the Universe and The Quran and Science.

== Work on evolution and creation ==
Alongside his work in biology and zoology, Yılmaz has written articles and books on evolution and creation. In these works, he approaches the biological characteristics and structures of living organisms from a creationist perspective.

His books on the subject include Alternatif Biyolojiye Doğru: Canlılar Dünyasına Farklı Bir Bakış, and Evrim Bilim mi İdeoloji mi?. His book Hayatın İhtişamı Karşısında Evrimin Acizliği was publish in 2024.

== Selected works ==
- Alternatif Biyolojiye Doğru: Canlılar Dünyasına Farklı Bir Bakış (1995)
- Yeni Bir Bakış Açısıyla İlim ve Din (1998)
- Hayvanların Dilinden (2005)
- Hayvanlar Konuşuyor (2005)
- Evrim Bilim mi İdeoloji mi? (2009)
- Yitik Hazinenin Kaşifi: Fuat Sezgin (2009)
- Çevre Eğitiminde Temel Kavramlar (1998)
- Okul Öncesi Çevre Eğitimi (1999)
- Ornitholoji Dersleri (1984)
- Türkiye Amfibileri (1984)
- Taksonomik Zoolojinin Prensip ve Metotları (1997; second edition 2012)
- Hayatın İhtişamı Karşısında Evrimin Acizliği (2024)
