= Ekrem Dumanlı =

Turkish journalist (born 1964)

- Born: 1964 (age 61–62); Yozgat, Turkey
- Education: Istanbul University
- Occupations: Journalist, writer
- Known for: Editor in chief of daily Zaman

Ekrem Dumanlı (born 1964) is a Turkish newspaper executive. From 2001 until its closure by the government in 2016, he was the editor-in-chief of the newspaper Zaman, one of the most circulated newspapers in Turkey. He was also the chief executive officer of its English-language version, Today's Zaman.

Dumanlı graduated from the Department of Turkish Language and Literature at Istanbul University and worked for a time as a teacher of literature. He has also held a teaching position at Fatih University in Istanbul.

In 1993, he started working as a reporter for the Culture and Art Desk of Zaman. He was later assigned as Culture and Art Desk editor and publication coordinator. In 1997, Dumanlı went to the United States to further his studies in the media, completing his master's degree at Boston Emerson College. Returning to Turkey in 2001, Dumanlı was appointed editor-in-chief of Zaman.

His articles have also been published by the foreign press, including "The Turkey-U.S. Divide" by the Los Angeles Times. A play he wrote, titled The Last Trial, was performed on stage. Dumanlı is a member of Medya Derneği (Media Association), the World Association of Newspapers (WAN), the Türkiye Yazarlar Birliği (Turkish Writers Union), and the BJK Sports Club Congress.

Dumanlı was listed in Georgetown University's list of The 500 Most Influential Muslims in 2009. he is a known member of the Gulen Movement.

== Works ==
- 28 Şubat gölgesinde Amerika (2003)
- Medya: makasların gölgesinden ilkelerin zirvesine (2003)
- Son duruşma (2005)
- Üç mesele: iktidar, medya, Ergenekon: 2007–2008 Pazartesi mektupları (2008)
- Anlık Hikâyeler (2009)
- Sinemaya farklı yerden bakmak (2009)
- Konuşma zamanı (2014)
- Âlimler ve zalimler (2014)
- Kapımıza dayanan tehlike: yobazlaşma (2015)
- Time to Talk: An Exclusive Interview with Fethullah Gülen (2015)

== 2014 arrest and criticism of government ==
On 14 December 2014 Turkish police arrested more than two dozen senior journalists and media executives on charges of "forming, leading and being a member of an armed terrorist organization." Among those now detained was Dumanlı, who was serving as editor-in-chief of Zaman. The arrested were people associated with the Gülen movement. The Turkish government accuses the movement of infiltrating the police and judiciary. Police arriving at 7.30 a.m. at the newspaper's office were greeted by scores of protesters shouting "a free media cannot be silenced." Police retreated only to reappear in the afternoon when Dumanlı gave himself up voluntarily.

A statement by the US State Department drawing attention to raids against media outlets "openly critical of the current Turkish government", cautioned Turkey not to violate its "own democratic foundations". EU foreign affairs chief Federica Mogherini and EU Enlargement Commissioner Johannes Hahn said that the arrests went "against European values" and "are incompatible with the freedom of media, which is a core principle of democracy".

On 19 December 2014 a court ordered that Dumanlı and seven others to be released due to lack of evidence. Thousands gathered outside Çağlayan Courthouse in İstanbul to show support for the detained journalists and police officials. While crowds celebrated the release of Dumanlı in the courtyard of the courthouse, they protested the arrest order for Samanyolu TV General Manager Hidayet Karaca and former police chiefs Tufan Ergüder, Ertan Erçıktı and Mustafa Kılıçaslan.

Ekrem Dumanlı wrote for The Washington Post about his arrest process and obstacles about freedom of press in Turkey, where he said "My newspaper, Zaman, and I are just the latest victims of Erdoğan's witch hunt", blaming Turkish president Recep Tayyip Erdoğan for his arrest.

Many international press freedom organizations and European institutions described the cases against Dumanlı and other journalists as politically motivated and linked to a broader crackdown on independent media in Turkey. Dumanlı has consistently denied the accusations against him, stating that his arrest and the closure of Zaman were part of a wider campaign against critical journalism. He has portrayed the proceedings as violations of due process and freedom of expression in articles and public statements published abroad.
