= Abdullah Aymaz =

Turkish writer

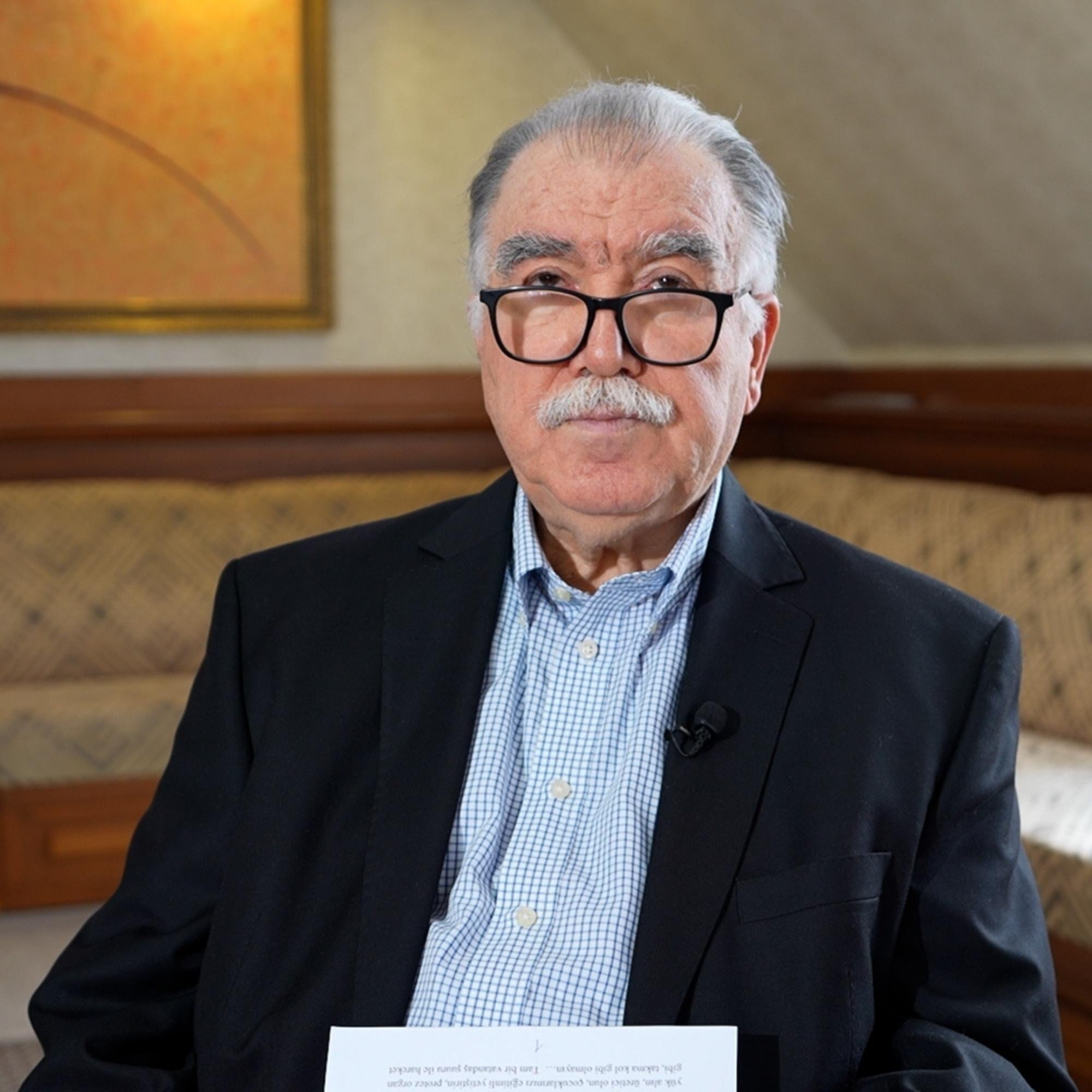
- Aymaz in 2025
- Born: 1949 (age 76–77); Emet, Kütahya, Turkey
- Education: İzmir Higher Islamic Institute(today's Faculty of Theology at Dokuz Eylül University)
- Occupations: Writer, journalist
- Writing career
- Pen name: İsmail Yediler, Hüseyin Bayram, Safvet Senih
- Years active: 1988-present
- Genres: Religion, Islam, morality, education, and human values

Abdullah Aymaz (born in Kütahya, Turkey, 1949) is a Turkish Islamic preacher and writer. Known for his long-standing close friendship with Fethullah Gülen, Abdullah Aymaz is regarded as one of the leading intellectual figures of the Hizmet (or Gülen) movement.

== Life and education ==
Abdullah Aymaz was born in 1949 in Hacımahmut, a village in the Emet district of Kütahya Province, Turkey. He completed his primary education in his hometown and later attended İzmir İmam Hatip High School. During his high school years, he became acquainted with Turkish scholar and opinion leader Fethullah Gülen and the Gülen movement. Aymaz graduated from İzmir Higher Islamic Institute, which is now the Faculty of Theology at Dokuz Eylül University.

== Career ==
After graduating from the İzmir Higher Islamic Institute, Aymaz worked as a teacher in Tire and İzmir. He later held administrative positions in several private educational foundations. During his time in high school, he wrote up articles for Gurbet magazine.

In 1979, his religious and educational articles began to be published in Sızıntı magazine, which is the very first publication of Hizmet Movement. His career as a journalist as well as a writer started in 1988 when he started to work for the Turkish newspaper Zaman. As of 1988, his journalism career commenced in Zaman newspaper, in which he also served as editor-in-chief until 1992. In his newspaper columns, he focused on themes such as faith, morality, education, and human values.

As writer, he published more than 50 books under the pen names of Huseyin Bayram, Ismail Yediler and Safvet Senih. Aymaz resides in Germany as of 2025 and continues his writings and programs in Europe-based media outlets.

Aymaz serves as Vorsitzender (chair of the supervisory board) of Stiftung Dialog und Bildung, a Berlin-based foundation promoting inter-cultural dialogue and education.

In March 1997, he conveyed Fethullah Gülen's letter to Pope John Paul II. Since the days in İzmir, where Gülen's outstanding discourse began to crystallize, Abdullah Aymaz has become an integral part of him and the movement.

In November 2025, Aymaz delivered the opening speech at a Nostra Aetate 60th anniversary event in a church, discussing the document's provisions on Muslim-Christian relations, shared Abrahamic heritage, and calls for mutual understanding. He referenced historical examples including Fethullah Gülen's 1998 meeting with Pope John Paul II.

Following the investigations launched after 15 July 2016, he was accused by the Turkish government of being a leader of the Gülen movement and of heading a terrorist organization. However, the Gülen movement is not designated as a terrorist organization by the European Union, the United States, the United Kingdom, Canada, Australia and New Zealand due to lack of credible evidence.

== Books ==
Abdullah Aymaz's published works include both printed books and E-books.

- Göze Takılanlar / Makaleler ve Gezi Notları 1 ISBN 9789756836217
- Göze Takılanlar / Makaleler ve Gezi Notları 2 ISBN 9789756836224
- Göze Takılanlar / Makaleler ve Gezi Notları 3 ISBN 9789756836231
- Çitlembik 1 ISBN 9789758642397
- Şifa Çiçekleri ISBN 9789757402862
- Diyalog Adımları ISBN 9789756714218
- Meryem Gibi ISBN 9789752780033
- Evrensel Dil ISBN 9789752780064
- Kastamonu Lahikası Üzerine ISBN 9789759090333
- Lemaat ISBN 9789759090340
- Günümüz Yusuflarına ISBN 9789752781412
- Çitlembik 3 ISBN 9789752781269
- Sadık Yar ISBN 9789752780668
- Barla Lahikası Üzerine ISBN 9789759090555
- Ayetül Kübra Üzerine ISBN 9789752781559
- Kardelenlerimiz ISBN 9789752780040
- Işığın Düştüğü Yerler ISBN 9789752780057
- Münazarat ISBN 9789759090517
- Çitlembik-2 ISBN 9789758642373
- Hizmet Rehberi Üzerine ISBN 9781682363089
- Muhakemat Üzerine ISBN 9789759090968
- Hutbe-i Şamiye Üzerine ISBN 9786050073010
- The Fruits of Worship ISBN 9781597842525
- Les Fruits de L'adoration ISBN 9789752784437
- Hanımlar Rehberi Üzerine ISBN 9781682367513
- Gençlik Rehberi Üzerine ISBN 9781682367520
- Sözün Çağrısı ISBN 9789752782419
- Cihetsiz Sesler ISBN 9789752782037
- Bakıp Göremediklerimiz ISBN 9789752782044
- Latif Nükteler ve Nur Aleminin Bir Anahtarı Risaleleri Üzerine ISBN 9786055119768
- Zor Zamanlar ISBN 9786051580654
- Nokta ve Şuaat-ı Marifeti'n-Nebi Risaleleri Üzerine ISBN 9786059842174
- Divan-ı Harb-i Örfi ve Hutuvat-ı Sitte Risaleleri Üzerine ISBN 9786059842150
- Rumuz, İşarat ve Tuluat Risaleleri Üzerine ISBN 9786059842143
- Meyve Risalesi Üzerine ISBN 9781682368077
- Emirdağ Lâhikası Üzerine Açıklamalar 1-2 (E-book)
- İhlas Uhuvvet Risaleleri Üzerine Açıklamalar (E-book)
- Peygamber Efendimiz’i Tanıtan Reşhalar (E-book)
- Ramazan İktisat Şükür Risalesi Üzerine Açıklamalar (E-book)
- Hastalar ve İhtiyarlar Risalesi Üzerine Açıklamalar (E-book)
