= Sevinç Özarslan =

Turkish journalist and human rights activist

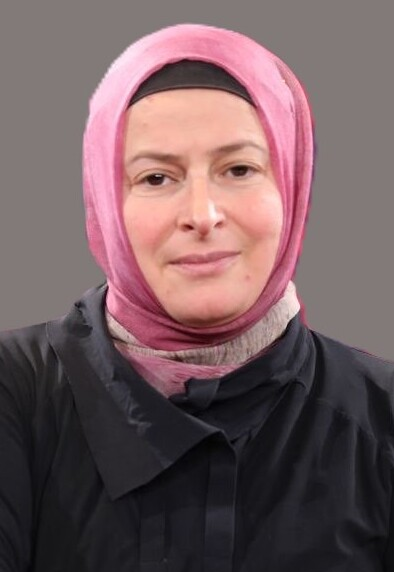
- Sevinç Özarslan in 2025
- Born: May 26, 1976 (age 50); Hopa, Artvin, Turkey
- Citizenship: Turkey
- Education: Istanbul University; Faculty of Communication
- Occupations: Journalist, researcher, writer
- Organization: German Journalists Association

Sevinç Özarslan (born May 26, 1976, in Hopa, Artvin, Turkey) is a Turkish journalist. She graduated from Istanbul University Faculty of Communication, Department of Journalism. She is known for her reporting focusing on human rights violations, unlawful acts, and various victimizations. Since 2016 Turkish coup attempt, amid increased repression of independent media in Turkey, she has lived in exile. Özarslan continues her journalism work in Germany, with her reports cited by German media outlets such as Frankfurter Rundschau. She has written for independent outlets such as TR724, Samanyolu Haber and contributed to the International Journalists Association (IJA). She also shares her work and commentary through platforms including X (formerly Twitter) and Patreon. She is a member of the German Journalists Association.

== Career ==
Özarslan began her journalism career at the Sabah Group and later worked for the Yeni Binyıl newspaper. After the Yeni Binyıl closed following the 2001 economic crisis in Turkey, she spent some time working in art galleries and publishing houses. During this period, she contributed to exhibitions at Bebek Art Gallery, featuring prominent Turkish painters such as Nuri Iyem, Irfan Okan, Temur Köran, Nedret Sekban, and Neşe Erdok.

In 2005, she joined the Zaman, where she worked as a reporter in the Culture and Arts sections for nearly a decade. After the Zaman Newspaper was shut down by the Turkish government following the 2016 coup attempt, Özarslan continued her work through independent media. She focused on reporting human rights violations, arbitrary detention, torture, and ill treatment in Turkey. She is widely recognized for drawing attention to victims in Turkey and for exposing human rights and legal violations through her reporting and social media presence.

Particularly noteworthy reports include:

- Footage showing the death of decree-law (KHK) - affiliated teacher Gökhan Açıkkollu, who died in Istanbul Police Department’s C4 Detention Center, allegedly following torture.
- Photographs of KHK-affiliated assistant commissioner Mustafa Kabakçıoğlu, who was found dead in solitary confinement at Gümüşhane E-Type Prison, reportedly due to lack of medical care.
- The case of former Council of Judges and Prosecutors (HSYK) member Teoman Gökçe, who died after a delayed medical response to a heart attack during 16 months in solitary confinement at Sincan T-Type Prison.
- The strip-search scandal involving female students during their detention at the Uşak Police Department, which brought Özarslan significant public attention.

Özarslan’s reporting on the Uşak Police incident was later raised in the Turkish Grand National Assembly by MP Ömer Faruk Gergerlioğlu. Following this, Uşak Police Chief Mesut Gezer and several police officers filed complaints against Gergerlioğlu. He was subsequently detained in March 2021 based on an article he shared on T24. Similarly, a detention warrant was issued for Sevinç Özarslan, and investigations were launched against her regarding her interviews with female students.

In March 2026, Özarslan participated in the 70th session of the United Nations Commission on the Status of Women (CSW70) in New York. She was a featured speaker in the panel "Authoritarian Power, Gendered Body, and Politics of Autonomy," where she addressed the systemic silencing of women and documented human rights violations in Turkey. During the discussion, she emphasized the importance of international solidarity in supporting journalists in exile and victims of state repression.

External videos
- Sevinç Özarslan's international advocacy and reporting
- Presentation at UN CSW70: Authoritarian Power and Gendered Body
- Interview with Dr. Hafza Girdap: Reflections on the UN CSW70

Following the 70th session of the United Nations Commission on the Status of Women, Özarslan published an extensive analysis titled "Inside the Silence: Sexual Violence and Medical Abuse in Turkish Prison." In this work and her subsequent televised interview with AST spokesperson Dr. Hafza Girdap, she documented the "systemic silencing" of female political prisoners. Her reporting detailed specific instances of medical neglect and sexual violence, urging the international community to confront what she described as the "gendered dimensions of authoritarian repression" in Turkey.

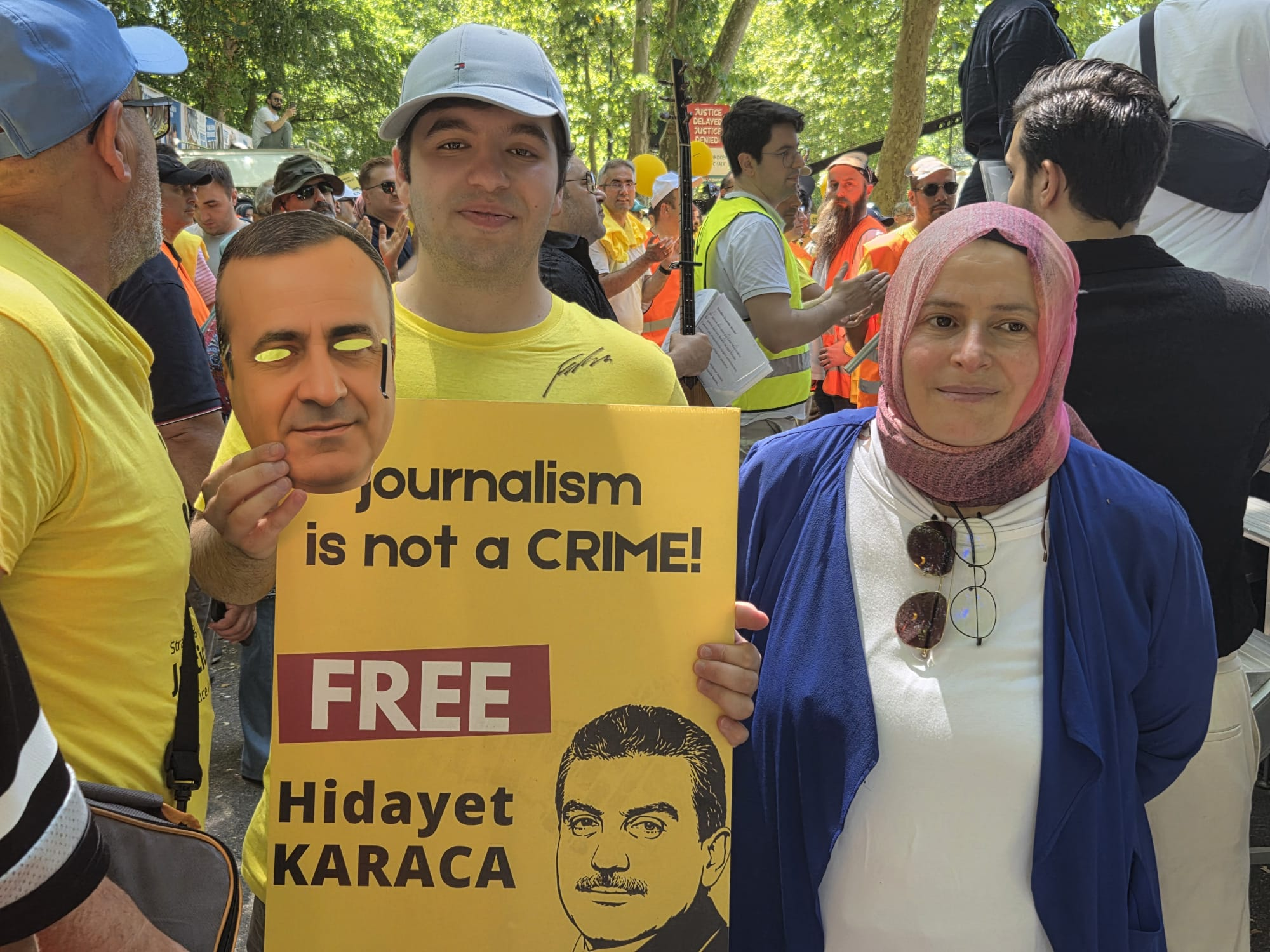
Özarslan at the 5th Strasbourg Justice March, standing next to a supporter holding "journalism is not a CRIME!" and "FREE Hidayet KARACA" signs.

In June 2026, Özarslan attended the 5th Strasbourg Justice Meeting in front of the Council of Europe and the European Court of Human Rights.

== Politicized legal proceedings ==
Following the July 15 coup attempt, Sevinç Özarslan-despite having no prior charges in investigations related to the Gülen movement-was accused by several public prosecutor’s offices, particularly in Uşak, Kayseri, and Kırıkkale, of membership in a terrorist organization. These accusations were reportedly linked to her reporting on human rights violations. As a response to her continued reporting on human rights violations in Turkey, Turkey froze her assets. The official decree was published in the Turkish government’s Official Gazette on December 24, 2021. Özarslan shared the decision—signed by then–Minister of Interior Süleyman Soylu and Minister of Treasury and Finance Nureddin Nebati—on social media, stating that she had no assets in Turkey. Freezing the assets of journalists and critics is a practice used by the Turkish government to suppress criticism.

On May 28, 2024, the Kayseri Public Prosecutor’s Office launched a new investigation against her on charges of “unlawfully obtaining or disseminating personal data."This investigation was based on a report published on the Kronos news website titled “Dismissed F-16 pilot Yahya Tarih died in a tractor accident."

Responding to the investigation, Özarslan stated:

"They want to imprison, kill, or abandon to death everyone they label as FETÖ member. Unfortunately, the entire justice system in Turkey is built on this hatred. An F-16 pilot died in his village while farming, having suffered all injustices imaginable... The so-called prosecutors who sit in the seats of justice choose to silence me for reporting on the death of this pilot. Bring it on, dear prosecutor. Do your job. Because I will continue to do mine."

== Exile and surveillance allegations ==
Since leaving Turkey in October 2016, Özarslan has been living in Germany. According to reports from international press freedom organizations such as Committee to Protect Journalists(CJP), she has been subject to surveillance by Turkish authorities and harassment on social media.

Leaked documents from Turkey’s Ministry of Foreign Affairs, published by Nordic Monitor, indicate that Özarslan was listed among exiled journalists critical of the government. The documents suggest efforts to monitor such journalists abroad and to prepare legal cases against them.
