= Mümtaz'er Türköne =

Turkish academic and author

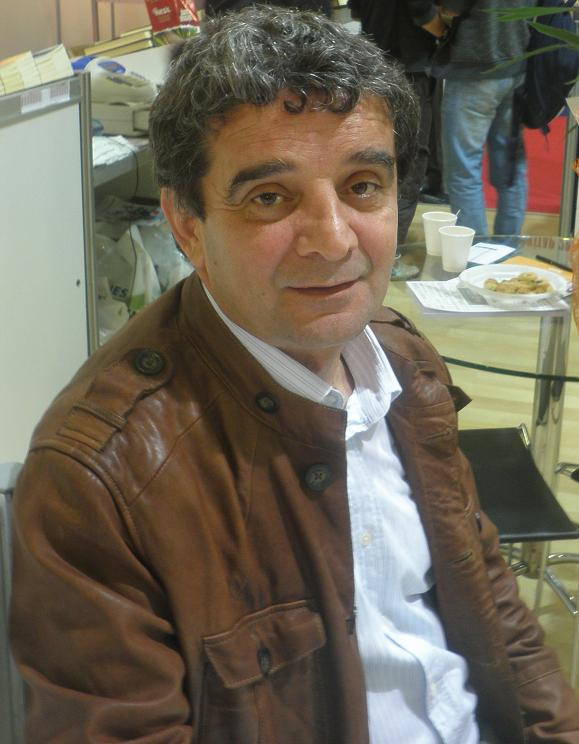
- Born: 1956 (age 69–70); Istanbul, Turkey
- Education: Gazi University
- Occupations: Academician, author, columnist
- Writing career
- Years active: 1993-present

Mümtaz'er Türköne, (born 1956 in Istanbul), is a Turkish academic and author. He was a faculty member at Gazi University from 1993 to 2007 and was a columnist for the Zaman and its English-language sister Today's Zaman.

In the 1990s Türköne was a member of the Analitik Grubu group of advisors to Prime Minister Tansu Çiller.

In January 2012 Türköne resigned from the Atatürk Culture, Language and History Institution, a month after being appointed by President Abdullah Gül. His appointment had been criticised as Türköne had previously described Atatürkism as a "closed minded and bigoted" ideology.

He is the ex-husband of former AKP deputy Özlem Türköne.

== Awards ==
- Türkiye Yazarlar Birliği 2006, "Media/thought" category

== Books ==
- Siyasi İdeoloji Olarak İslamcılığın Doğuşu
- Cemaleddin Afgani (on Jamal ad-Din al-Afghani)
- Siyaset
- Darbe Peşinde Koşan Bir Nesil 68 Kuşağı
- Sözde Askerler
- Türkiye'nin Kayıp Halkası
- Türklük ve Kürtlük
- Türk Modernleşmesi
- Modernleşme, Laiklik
- Siyasi, Tarihi, Dini ve Kültürel Boyutlarıyla İslam ve Şiddet
- Türkler ve İslamiyet (with İlber Ortaylı and Nevzat Yalçıntaş.)
- Kürt Meselesi Nasıl Çözülmez? (with Hüseyin Yayman)
