= Bilici (surname) =

Bilici is a Turkish surname. Notable people with the name include:

- Abdülhamit Bilici, Turkish journalist and media executive
- Bilal Bilici, Turkish politician
- Mucahit Bilici, American Muslim sociologist
- Rahman Bilici, Turkish sport wrestler
