= Cem Kızıltuğ =

Turkish cartoonist and illustrator (born 1974)

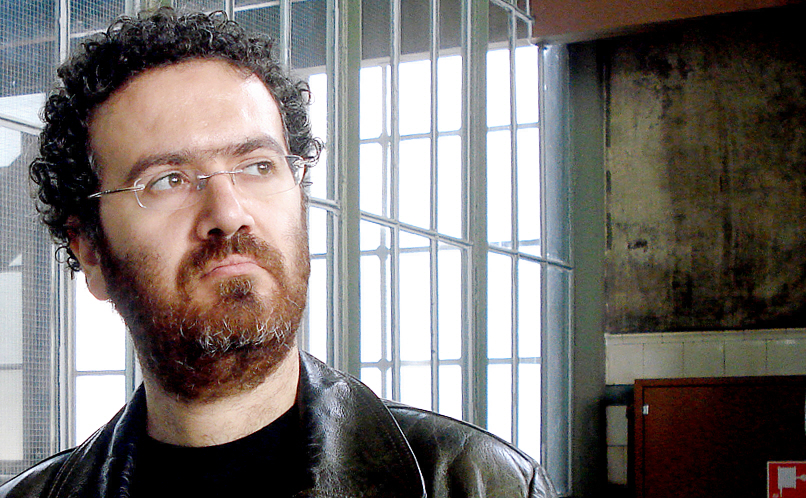
- Cem Kızıltuğ, October 2007
- Born: Cem Kızıltuğ; 16 April 1974 (age 52) Istanbul, Turkey
- Areas: artist, illustrator, cartoonist.

Cem Kızıltuğ (born 1974, Istanbul) is a Turkish cartoonist and illustrator. He is a cartoonist and illustrator for Zaman and also illustrates children's books.

== Career ==
Kızıltuğ developed a comic strip called "Mr. Diplomat" for Zaman's English-language subsidiary, Today's Zaman, in 2007.
