= Ahmet Turan Alkan =

Turkish writer (1954–2026)

- Born: 1954; Sivas, Turkey
- Died: 21 January 2026 (aged 71–72); Bursa, Turkey
- Occupations: Journalist, writer, academic

Ahmet Turan Alkan (1954 – 21 January 2026) was a Turkish journalist, academic, and writer. He wrote for the newspaper Zaman and the news magazine Aksiyon, and later became known for his prosecution and imprisonment following the 2016 Turkish coup attempt investigations.

== Early life and education ==
Alkan completed his primary and secondary education in Sivas. In 1972, he enrolled in the Faculty of Political Sciences at Ankara University and graduated in 1977 from the Department of Political Science and Public Administration.

He began his journalism career in 1974, publishing his first column in the local newspaper Anadolu Gazetesi in Sivas. He later contributed to several magazines and newspapers in Sivas and Ankara.

== Academic career ==
After completing his compulsory military service in Tatvan in 1982, Alkan worked in the private sector before joining Cumhuriyet University in 1985. Following the completion of his master's and doctoral degrees, he was appointed lecturer in the Faculty of Economics and Administrative Sciences, Department of Public Administration.

He retired from Cumhuriyet University in 2008 and subsequently moved to the Üsküdar district of Istanbul.

== Journalism ==
Beginning in 1989, Alkan regularly published essays and opinion columns in various Turkish newspapers and magazines. He wrote for the daily newspaper Zaman and the weekly news magazine Aksiyon.

His book Altıncı Şehir ("The Sixth City") was conceived as a literary response to Ahmet Hamdi Tanpınar's Beş Şehir, focusing on Sivas as an additional city.

He also prepared an unpublished novel titled Sağ Yanım.

== Arrest, trial and imprisonment ==
On 27 July 2016, Alkan was detained as part of investigations targeting alleged members of the Gülen movement following the attempted coup in Turkey.

On 31 July 2016, he was formally arrested on charges of "membership in an armed terrorist organization".

On 6 July 2018, he was sentenced to 8 years and 9 months in prison on the same charge and was released pending appeal.

After the sentence was finalized, he was re-arrested and returned to prison.

== Death ==
According to Turkish media reports, Alkan died on 21 January 2026 after suffering a heart attack while in detention and being transferred to a hospital in Bursa.

== Works ==
- Altıncı Şehir (1992)
- İkinci Meşrutiyet Devrinde Ordu ve Siyaset (1992)
- Sivas’ta Şapka İnkılâbı Davaları ve İstiklal Mahkemeleri (1993)
- Cemil Meriç Doğu-Batı Karşısında (1993)
- Üç Noktanın Söyledikleri (1995)
- Ateş Tecrübeleri (1996)
- Fevkalade Bir Genç Türk: Ubeydullah Efendi'nin Amerika Hatıraları (1997)
- Yatağını Seven Nehirler (1997)
- Kurşun Kalem Resimleri (1999)
- Yol Türküleri (1999)
- Münazara Arkadaşlarıma Başarılar Dilerim... (2001)
- Hac Günlüğü (2002)
- Hat (2002)
- Konuş da Seni Göreyim (2004)
- Eğlenelim Gülelim (2005)
- Gemilerde Talim Var (2005)
- Ziya Nur Üzerine Dostlarla Sohbet (2010)
- Derin Devlet, AKP ve Kürtler (2011)
- Neşeli Kitap (2012)
- Sivas’ın Resmi (2012)
