= Levent Kenez =

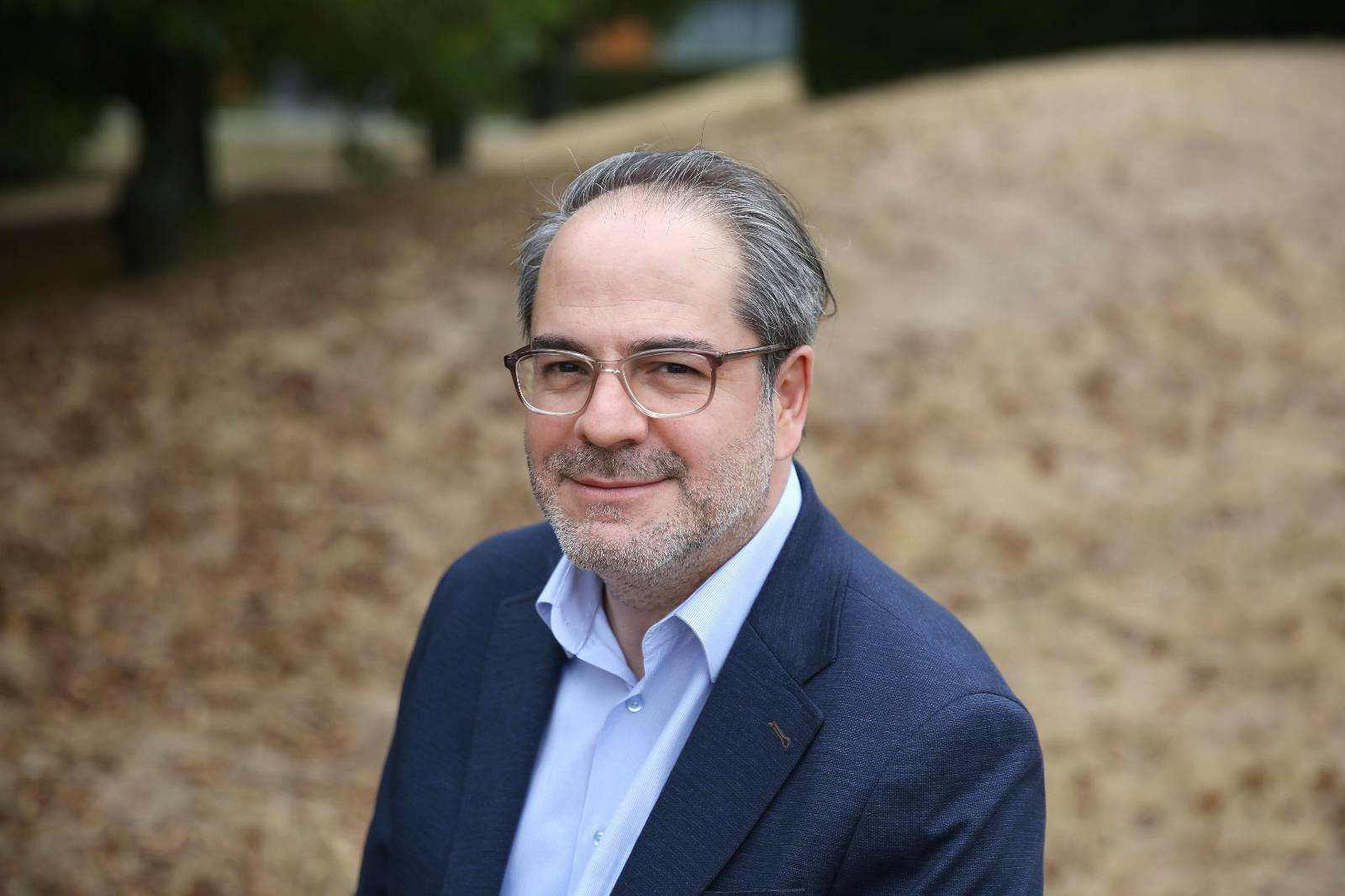
- Born: December 16, 1978 (age 47); Manisa, Turkey
- Citizenship: Turkish
- Education: Boğaziçi University Political Science and International Relations
- Occupations: Journalist, writer
- Years active: 1999-present
- Organization(s): Swedish Union of Journalists(Journalistförbundet), Stockholm Center for Freedom

Levent Kenez (born December 16, 1978, in Manisa, Turkey) is a Turkish journalist and writer. He graduated from Boğaziçi University with a degree in Political Science and International Relations. Kenez has worked as a columnist, editor, and editor-in-chief for various national newspapers in Turkey. Due to increasing pressures on the media, he relocated to Sweden in 2016.

== Career ==
Levent Kenez began his professional career in 1999 at İŞHAD, a business association in Istanbul, where he was involved in preparing publications and organizing events. In 2005, he joined the newspaper Zaman as an assistent, became the op-ed editor in 2007, and later took charge of the weekend supplements in 2011. On April 6, 2015, he became the editor-in-chief of Meydan newspaper.

After moving to Sweden, Kenez continued his journalism career at Nordic Monitor, an English-language digital platform. He primarily focuses on issues related to press freedom and human rights in Turkey. He is also a founding member of the Stockholm Center for Freedom, an organization monitoring human rights violations in Turkey. Additionally, Kenez hosts the weekday morning program "Serbest Atış" on the TR724 YouTube channel.

Kenez is a member of both the Turkish Journalists Association (TGC) and the Swedish Union of Journalists (Journalistförbundet).

== Legal proceedings and pressures ==
Following the July 15, 2016 coup attempt in Turkey, Kenez was among the first journalists detained. The Bakırköy 6th Criminal Court of Peace ordered the confiscation of Meydan newspaper’s July 20, 2016 issue. The newspaper was subsequently banned due to its headline "Biliyordunuz Engellemediniz” Kenez and managing editor Gülizar Baki were detained during a police raid and Meydan was shut down by the government. Kenez was released by the prosecutor's office on July 21, 2016, but on July 25, 2016, the Istanbul Chief Public Prosecutor’s Office Terror and Organized Crime Bureau issued an arrest warrant for him. On April 29, 2020, Turkey formally requested Kenez’s extradition from Sweden, accusing him of membership in an armed terrorist organization and other charges. On December 14, 2021, the Swedish Supreme Court rejected the extradition request, ruling that the evidence did not constitute a criminal offense and that Kenez’s activities fell within the scope of journalistic work.

Kenez’s name re-emerged during negotiations between Turkey and Sweden following Sweden’s NATO membership application on May 16, 2022. Media reports indicated that Turkey made its approval conditional on the extradition of certain individuals, including Kenez. Some reports also suggested that Turkey demanded an end to Nordic Monitor’s publications. Following intense media coverage in Turkey regarding extradition requests, Turkish journalist Levent Kenez spoke in an interview with the Slovenian newspaper Dnevnik, stating: "I'm not worried that Sweden would extradite me to Turkey. I don't think there is any possibility that Sweden would trade in people's lives." This reflects Kenez's confidence in Sweden’s commitment to protecting political refugees and upholding human rights, despite Turkey's ongoing efforts and requests for his extradition.

On November 2, 2022, the Turkish newspaper Sabah published Kenez’s address in Sweden along with photographs purportedly taken without his consent. According to leaked confidential documents, some independent journalists living in exile in Europe, the United States, and Canada, including Kenez, have been targeted by a comprehensive surveillance program conducted by the National Intelligence Organization (Turkish:Milli İstihbarat Teşkilatı, MİT).

Kenez faces an ongoing trial related to a July 1, 2016 front-page headline in Meydan newspaper titled "Yılın Satış Elemanı-Salesperson of the Year” referencing remarks made by President Recep Tayyip Erdoğan about the Mavi Marmara incident. He is charged with "insulting the president."

A classified memo dated June 18, 2025, from Turkey’s Security General Directorate revealed covert attempts to circumvent INTERPOL rules in order to obtain an international arrest warrant, known as a Red Notice, against Levent Kenez, a Turkish journalist granted asylum in Sweden. The memo instructed Turkish authorities to avoid using politically sensitive charges that INTERPOL typically rejects and instead to cite other offenses to increase the chances of acceptance. This effort is part of broader attempts by the Turkish government to target exiled critics through international legal mechanisms.

== See also ==
- Turkey's media purge after the failed July 2016 coup d'état
- Stockholm Center for Freedom (SCF)
