= Turkish Review =

- Editor: Kerim Balci
- Categories: International relations, Current Events, Politics, Culture, Literature,
- Frequency: Bimonthly
- Circulation: 5,000
- Publisher: Feza Gazetecilik A.S.
- Founded: 2010
- Final issue: July 2016
- Country: Turkey
- Language: English
- Website: Turkish Review
- ISSN: 1309-9647

Turkish Review was a bimonthly journal published by Feza Publications, focusing primarily on Turkish politics and foreign policy, international affairs, global economics, integration and ideas, and matters related to global socio-political issues. It was available in print on newsstands and in bookstores; select articles are available online. Turkish Review also included press reviews, book reviews, interviews, and Turkish politics spotlights.

Along with the printed journal, Turkish Review also made strong use of its website, social media websites and tools such as Twitter, Friendfeed and Facebook etc., providing weekly commentary and news on current debates in international affairs and Turkish politics. The published articles and interviews were distributed bimonthly through an e-newsletter.
