= Stockholm Center for Freedom =

Human rights organization in Sweden

- Abbreviation: SCF
- Type: Advocacy organization
- Legal status: Non-profit organization
- Purpose: Human rights, press freedom
- Headquarters: Stockholm, Sweden
- Region served: Worldwide (focus: Turkey)
- Official language: English, Turkish
- Founder: Abdullah Bozkurt
- Secretary General: Levent Kenez
- Website: stockholmcf.org

Stockholm Center for Freedom (SCF) is a Sweden-based non-profit advocacy organization. It advocates for the rule of law, democracy, and human rights. The group primarily focusing on press freedom and human rights issues in Turkey. Founded in 2017 in Stockholm by exiled Turkish journalists, SCF was established by Abdullah Bozkurt with Levent Kenez serving as Secretary General. Both fled Turkey amid media crackdowns following the 2016 coup attempt.

== History ==
SCF emerged from Turkey's post-2016 coup purges. These actions closed over 200 media outlets. They also detained many journalists accused of coup ties. Now based in Stockholm, SCF tracks daily rights violations. It documents cases and issues reports on Turkey's human rights record. The group sometimes covers other countries as well.

== Activities and reports ==
SCF publishes news, commentaries, and thematic reports in English and Turkish. Topics include arbitrary detentions, torture claims, censorship, hate speech against refugees, and misuse of anti-terror laws. It has submitted shadow reports to UN bodies like the Human Rights Committee. These cover biased parole denials in prisons, over 130,000 public servant dismissals via emergency decrees, and 2023 blocks on 197,000 domains plus thousands of social media posts.

The Immigration and Refugee Board of Canada, DFAT, Parliamentary Assembly of the Council of Europe, European Parliament, United Nations Human Rights Council, and the Council of Europe Committee of Ministers have cited the Stockholm Center for Freedom's (SCF) research and reports on human rights issues in Turkey.

The group is a member of the Alliance Against Genocide.

== Allegations and criticism ==
Turkish government officials and pro-government media accuse SCF of ties to the Gülen movement. Turkey designates the movement a terrorist organization and holds it responsible for the 2016 coup attempt. These claims stem from founder Abdullah Bozkurt's prior role as bureau chief at the English edition of Zaman newspaper, which is described as Gülen-aligned. Turkey has issued an arrest warrant for Bozkurt and Kenez and portrays SCF as a Gülen-linked entity. In contrast, international bodies such as the European Union, United Nations, and European Court of Human Rights, along with countries like the United States, United Kingdom, Canada and Australia, do not endorse Turkey's designation of the Gülen movement as a terrorist organization.

SCF describes itself as an independent human rights advocacy group and criticizes the criminalization of journalists and civil society actors under Turkey's anti-terror framework.

== See also ==
- Gülen movement
- Turkey's media purge after the failed July 2016 coup d'état
