= Aydoğan =

Aydoğan is a Turkish name and may refer to:

== Given name ==
- Aydoğan Babaoğlu, retired Turkish military officer
- Aydoğan Vatandaş, investigative journalist from Turkey

== Surname ==
- Eray Aydoğan, Turkish basketballer
- Müslüm Aydoğan (born 1989), Turkish footballer
- Mustafa Aydogan (born 1957), contemporary Kurdish writer and translator
- Nilay Aydoğan (1992–2023), Turkish basketball player
- Oya Aydoğan (1957–2016), Turkish actress, model and television presenter
- Sümeyye Aydoğan (born 1999), Turkish actress
- Tayfun Aydoğan (born 1996), Turkish footballer

== Places ==
- Aydoğan, Bala, a village in the district of Balâ, Ankara Province
- Aydoğan, Refahiye
- Aydoğan, Sungurlu
