= Feza Publications =

Turkish company

- Industry: Publishing
- Founded: 1986
- Headquarters: Yenibosna, Istanbul, Turkey
- Area served: Turkey
- Key people: Ekrem Dumanlı (publisher) Abdülhamit Bilici (publisher)

Feza Publications Inc. (Feza Gazetecilik A.Ş) was a Turkish media conglomerate established in 1986. It had the ownership over the Zaman, Today's Zaman newspapers, the Cihan News Agency, as well as the Aksiyon, news magazine, the book publisher Zaman Kitap and Irmak TV channel. Feza Media Group was ranked 244th in top 500 companies in Turkey according to Istanbul Chamber of Industry's ISO500.

The company was shut down due to their association with FETO. All of its media outlets in Turkey were closed by the government following the 2016 coup attempt.

== Staff ==
Chief Executive Officers were Ekrem Dumanlı (2002–2015) and Abdulhamit Bilici (2015–2016)

Editors were Veysel Ayhan and Ali Akkuş. Social Media Editor was Salih Sarıkaya.

== Properties ==
=== Newspaper ===
- Zaman Newspaper
- Today's Zaman

=== Television ===
- Irmak TV
- Cihan Network TV

=== Radio ===
- Radyo Cihan

=== Magazine ===
- Aksiyon
- Turkish Review
- Cihan Dergi

=== News Agency ===
- Cihan News Agency
