= Strasbourg Justice Meetings =

Protest events organized in Strasbourg, France

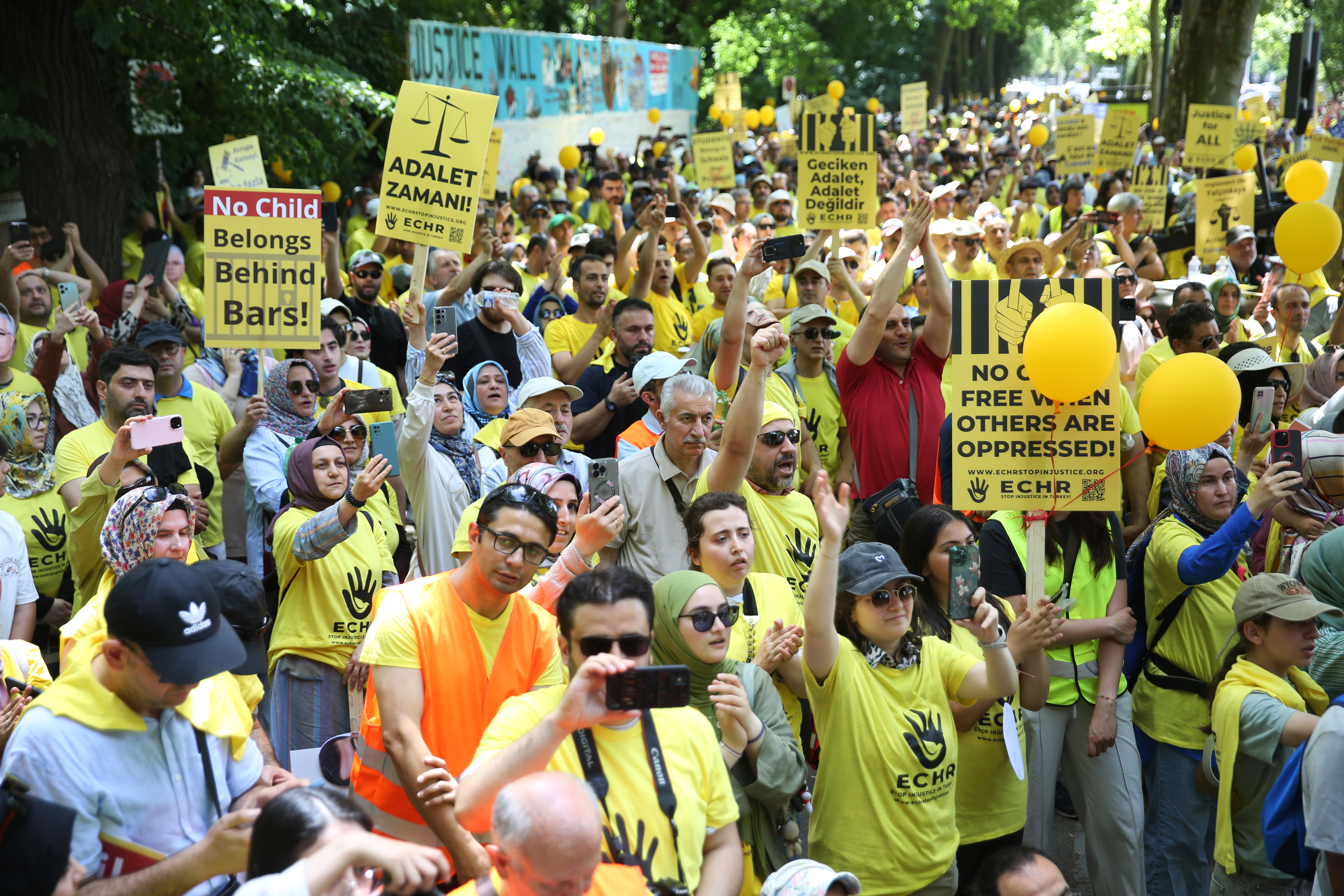
- 4th Strasbourg Justice Meeting, 25 June 2025
- Date: 2022 – present
- Location: Strasbourg, France
- Caused by: Human rights violations in Turkey; non-implementation of ECtHR judgments
- Status: Ongoing
- Result: Increased international awareness; appeals submitted to the ECtHR and the Council of Europe

Parties
Protesters	Turkish Government (indirect addressee)

Strasbourg Justice Meetings are international, peaceful protest and awareness-raising events organized since 2022 in the city of Strasbourg, France, in front of the Council of Europe (CoE) and the European Court of Human Rights (ECtHR), aiming to draw attention to human rights violations and unlawful practices in Turkey, as well as the non-implementation of judgments of the European Court of Human Rights (ECtHR).

The Justice Meetings are attended by thousands of victims, human rights defenders, journalists, members of parliament, and civil society organizations from Turkey and various European countries.

== Purpose and scope ==
The Justice Meetings were first held in June 2022. The main aim of the events is to draw the attention of the European public to dismissals, arbitrary detentions, violations of freedom of expression, and the non-implementation of ECtHR judgments following the state of emergency period and the decree-laws (KHKs) issued in Turkey, and to call on the Council of Europe and the ECtHR to take more effective steps and act to ensure the implementation of ECtHR judgments.

During the protests, demands are made for the implementation of violation judgments issued by the ECtHR regarding businessman Osman Kavala, Kurdish politician Selahattin Demirtaş, and teacher Yüksel Yalçınkaya; the release of political prisoners; the restoration of the rule of law; and support for victims' search for justice.

The protests that began in 2022 continued in 2023, 2024, and 2025; during these events, letters and petitions drawing attention to human rights violations in Turkey and reminding that ECtHR judgments are not being implemented were submitted to officials of the Council of Europe.

== History ==
=== 1st Strasbourg Justice Meeting (24 June 2022) ===
Approximately 2,000 people participated in the first meeting held on 24 June 2022. The protest was organized by the Peaceful Actions Platform, an umbrella organization of 24 civil society organizations. Demonstrators marched with the slogans "Justice for All" and "Justice for Everyone," calling for the implementation of ECtHR judgments, the release of political prisoners—especially Osman Kavala and Selahattin Demirtaş—and an end to human rights violations. Two letters addressed to the Council of Europe, its Human Rights Commissioner Dunja Mijatović, and its Secretary General Marija Pejčinović Burić were submitted.

=== 2nd Strasbourg Justice Meeting (20 June 2023) ===
The second meeting, held on 20 June 2023, drew more than 3,000 participants. Demonstrators marched to the ECtHR building with banners and slogans reading "ECtHR, end injustice in Turkey" and "Delayed justice is not justice," and submitted letters to the Council of Europe and the ECtHR.

Speakers included former leader of the UK Labour Party and UK MP Jeremy Corbyn, member of the German Left Party, the Bundestag, and the Parliamentary Assembly of the Council of Europe (PACE) Andrej Konstantin Hunko, as well as Norwegian former politician, journalist, and lawyer Odd Anders With. Journalists and politicians from various countries also supported the event with video messages. The demonstration highlighted the stories of victims and the suffering experienced by children.

=== 3rd Strasbourg Justice Meeting (2 October 2024) ===
The third meeting, held on 2 October 2024, took place on Allée de la Robertsau Avenue in front of the Council of Europe and ECtHR buildings. The event emphasized that ECtHR judgments concerning Osman Kavala, Selahattin Demirtaş, and Yüksel Yalçınkaya were not being implemented by the AKP government and judicial authorities, and called on the Council of Europe to take urgent action.

Activists gathered in front of the Council of Europe, which is responsible through the Committee of Ministers of the Council of Europe for supervising the execution of ECtHR judgments, chanting slogans such as "Council, ensure the implementation of the Yalçınkaya judgment," "Delayed justice is not justice," and "Victims are here, where is the court?" and submitted a letter containing their demands. They later marched to the ECtHR and submitted their letters to ECtHR officials. Letters addressed to Council of Europe Human Rights Commissioner Michael O'Flaherty, Secretary General Alain Berset, and ECtHR President Marko Bošnjak highlighted severe violations of fundamental human rights in Turkey, political pressure, and non-compliance with ECtHR judgments, calling for immediate action to ensure the implementation of the Kavala, Demirtaş, and Yalçınkaya decisions.

=== 4th Strasbourg Justice Meeting (25 June 2025) ===
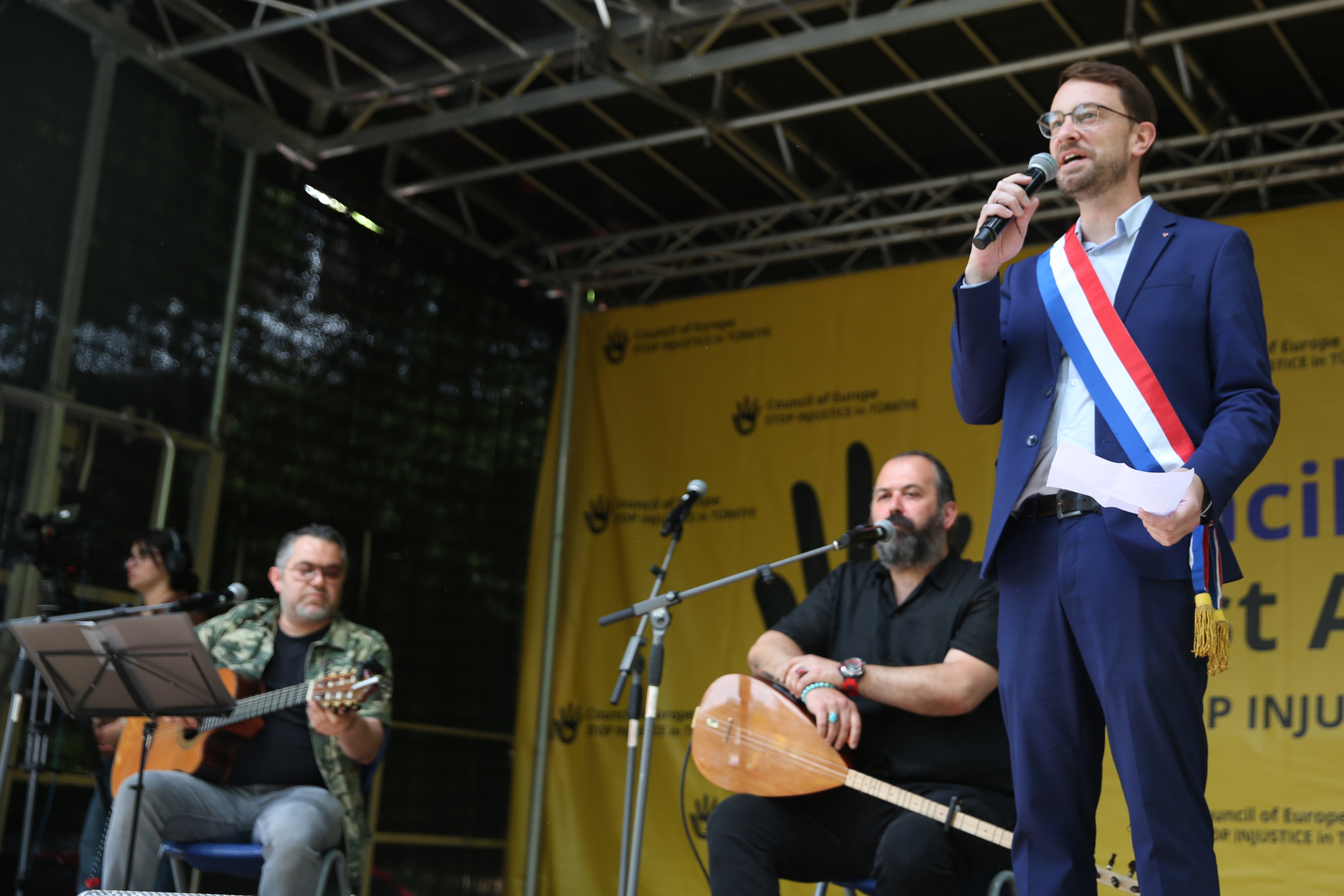
French MP Emmanuel Fernandes delivering a speech at the 4th Strasbourg Justice Meeting, 25 June 2025.

The fourth meeting, held on 25 June 2025, drew close to 5,000 participants. During marches and press statements in front of the Council of Europe and the ECtHR, calls were renewed for forcing Turkey to implement ECtHR judgments and for the release of political prisoners. Members of the Parliamentary Assembly of the Council of Europe (PACE) also attended the demonstration. Speeches were delivered by PACE members Laura Castel (Spain), Vinzenz Glaser (Germany), Belgian minister and MP Benjamin Dalle, French MP Emmanuel Fernandes, Belgian MP Christophe Lacroix, and Green Party MP Sandra Regol. PACE members drew attention to discriminatory practices, arbitrary detentions, and other human rights violations in Turkey, expressing messages of solidarity with the victims.

=== 5th Strasbourg Justice Meeting (24 June 2026) ===
On 24 June 2026, about 5,000 people took part in the 5th Strasbourg Justice Meeting. The gathering was described as a broad human rights and solidarity event that brought together participants from several countries. It was held in front of the Council of Europe building in order to draw attention to human rights violations in Turkey and the failure to implement European Court of Human Rights judgments. Demonstrators marched along the road beside the court chanting slogans, reached the front of the court, and then delivered letters addressed to the court's members.

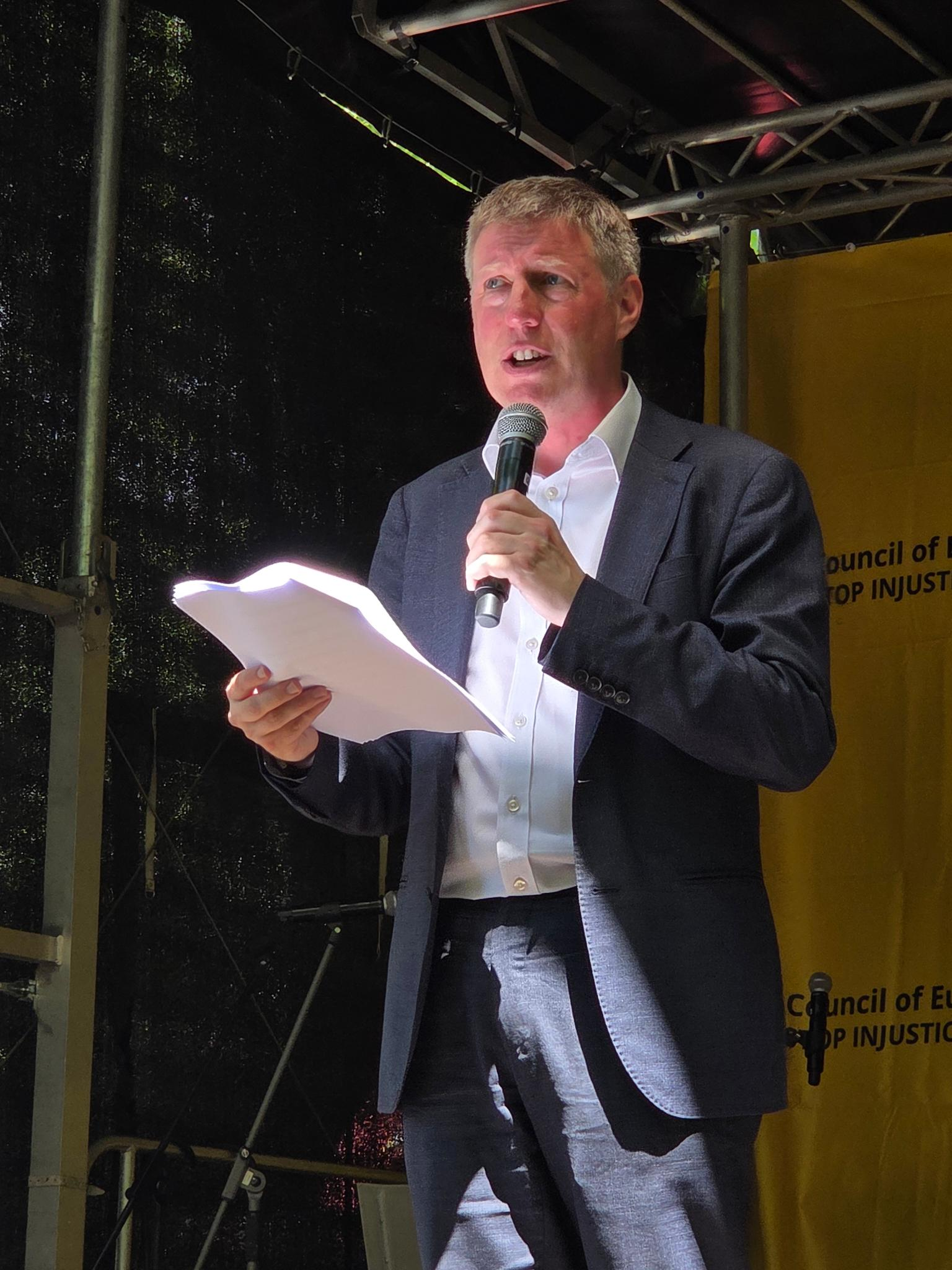
PACE member James McCleary speaking at the 5th Strasbourg Justice Meeting on 24 June 2026.

The event referred to the names of Selahattin Demirtaş, Ekrem İmamoğlu, Mehmet Baransu, Hidayet Karaca, Osman Kavala, Ali Ünal, and İlhan İşbilen. A theatre performance depicting unlawful trials, participants wrote messages on and signed the "wall of justice", and the songs Süvari and Grifon were performed. The event also featured speeches by U.S. journalist Sophia Pandya, PACE member James MacCleary, Tuncer Çetinkaya, Enes Kanter, and former prisoners. Video messages were sent by PACE members Sakis Arnaoutoglou (Greece), Daniel Freund (Germany), Michael Bloss (Germany), Raquel García Hermida van der Walle (the Netherlands), Kathleen Van Brempt (Belgium), and Brando Benifei (Italy).

A report by the American news agency Associated Press (AP) said the protest centered on the failure to implement judgments of the European Court of Human Rights and on calls for international institutions to take action. The AP also described the event as a gathering in Strasbourg of thousands of people demanding action over Turkey's failure to carry out ECtHR rulings. ANP, in turn, said the gathering brought thousands of people back onto the streets for Turkish human rights after ten years and noted that human rights groups described the post-2016 period as "one of the largest purges in modern Turkish history".

== Event content and international support ==
=== Submitted letters and demands ===
Each year, within the scope of the Strasbourg Justice Meetings, letters are submitted to the European Court of Human Rights (ECtHR) and the Council of Europe by victims, human rights defenders, and civil society representatives. These letters emphasize that Turkey does not implement ECtHR judgments, call for an end to unlawful practices, and demand stronger support from European institutions for victims' search for justice.

=== Artistic actions and international solidarity ===
During the Strasbourg Justice Meetings, various artistic and symbolic actions have been organized to make the demand for justice visible. At the events, an installation called the "Justice Wall" displayed photographs of victims; participants carried symbolic chains; theatrical performances and mini concerts by artists were held.

Additionally, bicycle justice rides were organized both in Strasbourg and in countries such as Germany, the Netherlands, and Belgium, with support from the Turkish diaspora in Europe. Together with parallel rallies, international panels, and conferences, these actions help amplify the voices of victims to a wider audience and create awareness and pressure on the Council of Europe and the European Court of Human Rights.

== Public opinion and media coverage ==
The Strasbourg Justice Meetings have been covered in national and international media due to their annual organization and participation from different countries. The events aim to bring the demands related to human rights violations of public officials dismissed after the state of emergency, journalists, academics, and civil society representatives in Turkey onto the agenda of the Council of Europe and the European Court of Human Rights.

The protests seek to raise awareness in the European public about issues such as freedom of expression, the right to a fair trial, and political detention, and are supported by various human rights organizations and diaspora communities in Europe. According to media reports, the Strasbourg Justice Meetings are considered part of broader efforts, together with similar human rights protests held in Europe, to set agendas and influence decision-makers at relevant institutions.

Some media outlets known for their closeness to the government have mostly described the demonstrations in Strasbourg as organizations linked to the Gülen Movement, labeling participants as "fugitive FETÖ members" or "FETÖ supporters."

These reports claimed that the protests held in front of the European Court of Human Rights were organized by anti-Turkey lobbies and aimed to increase international pressure on Turkey.

Additionally, some reports alleged that Ekrem İmamoğlu, Mayor of Istanbul Metropolitan Municipality from the Republican People's Party (CHP), indirectly supported the demonstrations, interpreting this as "support for FETÖ."

The same media outlets generally portrayed these events as anti-Turkey black propaganda activities, framing participants' demands not as a legitimate human rights struggle but as part of organizational interests.
