= Sevgi Akarçeşme =

Turkish journalist

- Born: 1979 (age 46–47); Istanbul, Turkey
- Occupations: Journalist, writer, media commentator
- Years active: 2009–present

Sevgi Akarçeşme (born 1979 in Istanbul, Turkey) is a Turkish journalist, writer and media commentator. She is the former editor‑in‑chief of the English‑language newspaper Today’s Zaman and is the editor‑in‑chief of the international news and analysis platform Turkish Minute.

== Education ==
Akarçeşme was born in 1979 in Istanbul. She studied political science at Bilkent University, followed by a master's in international relations at Istanbul Bilgi University and a master's in political science at Temple University in the United States.

== Career ==
During her time in the United States, Akarçeşme worked as a research assistant and at the Turkey desk of the Center for Strategic and International Studies (CSIS) in Washington, D.C.

After returning to Turkey, she worked between 2009 and 2012 as an advisor at the Presidency of the Republic of Turkey and later at the Center for Strategic Research (SAM) affiliated with the Ministry of Foreign Affairs. In 2012, she resigned to begin writing as a columnist for Today’s Zaman.

From 2015 she also wrote columns for Zaman. On 10 December 2015 she was appointed editor‑in‑chief of Today’s Zaman. She remained in this role until 6 March 2016, when a state‑appointed trustee took control of the newspaper.

== Life in Exile ==
Following the events of 2016, Akarçeşme lived outside Turkey. She participated in international conferences and delivered speeches on press freedom and human rights.

== Works ==
Akarçeşme is the author of the following books:

- Sevgi Alemi: Gezdim, Gördüm, Okudum (2015)
- Choices: The Life of a Turkish Journalist and Finding Freedom (2024)
