= International Journalists Association =

IJA (International Journalists Association)
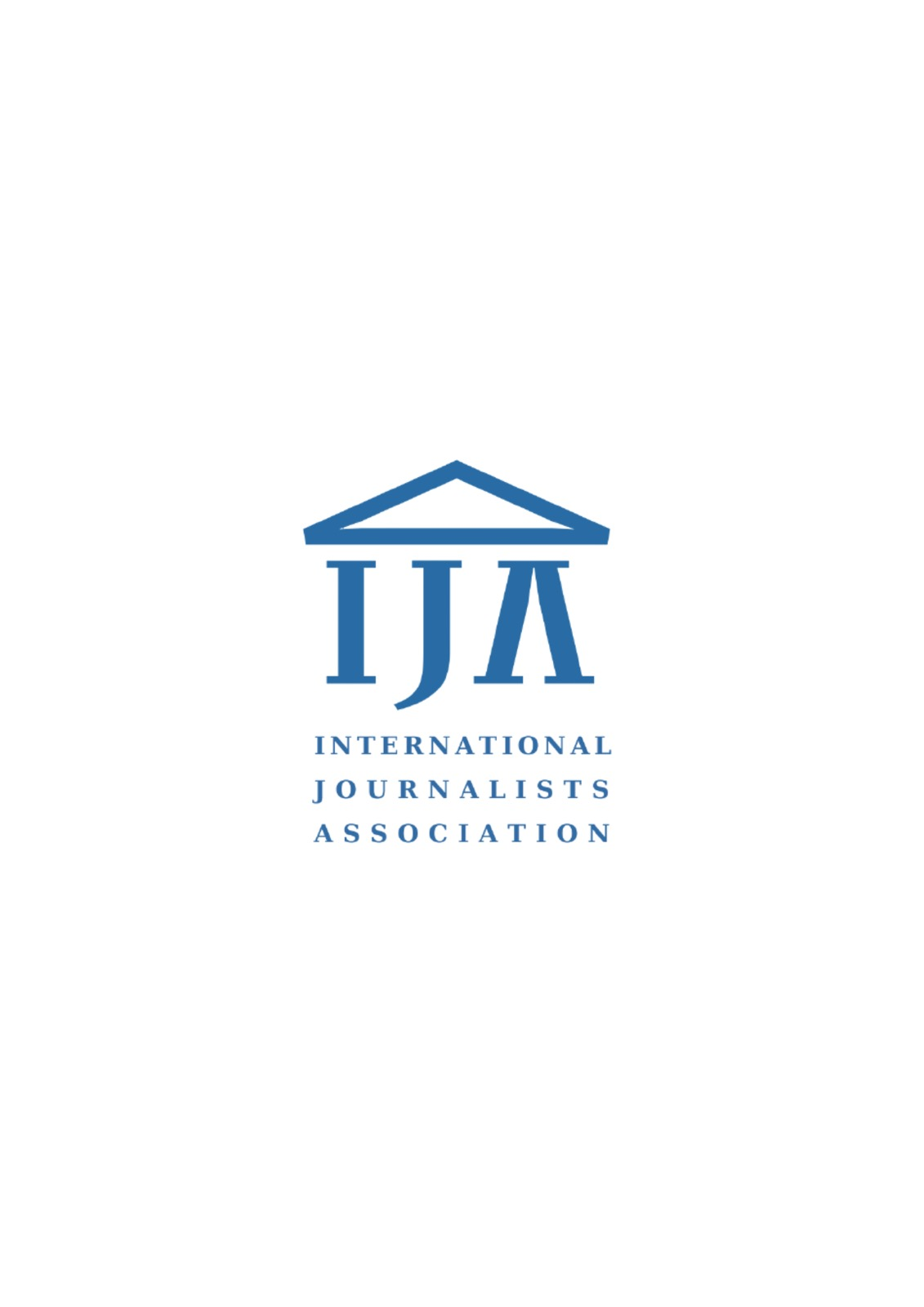
- Abbreviation: IJA
- Formation: 2019
- Type: Non-governmental organization
- Headquarters: Frankfurt, Germany
- Region served: Worldwide
- Members: 420 (2024)
- Website: https://internationaljournalists.org

IJA (International Journalists Association) is a journalists' association based in Frankfurt, Germany, founded in 2019. The organization is engaged in publishing, media-related events, and advocacy for press freedom.

== History ==
The association was established by a group of journalists seeking to continue their professional activities in exile in response to increasing restrictions on media freedom. Its founders include journalists such as Cevheri Güven.

As of August 2024, the association has approximately 420 members from 20 countries.

The association and its activities have been covered in international media. In 2024, reporting cited coverage in the German newspaper Die Tageszeitung (taz), describing the IJA as an organization that brings together exiled journalists and supports press freedom initiatives.

== Publications ==
The IJA publishes Journalist Post, a multilingual periodical issued biannually with contributions from international journalists.

The association is linked to several digital media platforms, including Turkish Minute, Deutsche Bold, Bosphorama, and Türkiye Today's.

The IJA has published reports addressing issues related to freedom of expression and press freedom, including book banning, restrictions on freedom of thought, closure of media outlets in Turkey, and the seizure of journalists' property.

== International cooperation and activities ==
The IJA is a partner organization in the Interkultureller Mediendialog (Intercultural Media Dialogue) platform.

Representatives of the association delivered presentations at the 58th session of the United Nations Human Rights Council on topics such as "digital authoritarianism" and "transnational repression".

The organization has participated in international events such as the Frankfurt Book Fair, Düsseldorf Campfire Festival, and Leipzig Revolutionäre Festival.

The IJA cooperates with international non-governmental organizations to support media dissemination and provide technical infrastructure for journalists.

The association co-organizes the Humanity Cartoons competition with Time to Help UK and HRS. It also organizes an event series titled Frankfurt Conversations in cooperation with Haus am Dom.

== Recent activities ==
In May 2025, the association co-organized the Frankfurter Gespräche ("Frankfurt Conversations"), a public discussion series held in cooperation with Haus am Dom to mark World Press Freedom Day. The opening event focused on press freedom, exile journalism, and the challenges faced by independent media.

In June 2026, representatives of the association participated in a demonstration in Strasbourg calling for the enforcement of judgments of the European Court of Human Rights. The initiative urged the Committee of Ministers of the Council of Europe to strengthen oversight of the implementation of the Court's rulings.

In June 2026, the association also organized an intercultural media dialogue in Germany addressing the future of Syrians living in the country. The discussion focused on integration, voluntary return, and the social and political implications of Germany's ongoing debate on Syrian refugees.
