= Cihan News Agency =

Turkish news agency

The Cihan News Agency (Turkish: Cihan Haber Ajansı) was a Turkish news agency based in Istanbul.

The agency, established in 1994, was part of Feza Publications, which also owned Zaman newspaper and Aksiyon, a weekly news magazine. Cihan New Agency, which produced news in the fields of current events, politics, economy, foreign news, art-magazine and sports, was daily servicing approximately 450 written news, 315 photos and 100 video news. On July 27, 2016, the agency was closed under a statutory decree during the state of emergency after the 2016 Turkish coup d'état attempt, due to its alleged links with the Gülen movement.

== Services ==
Cihan News Agency provided news services to 78 percent of national newspapers and 53 percent of national televisions in Turkey. The agency was also firmly established on the local level with many subscribers among local TV and radio stations, newspapers and with its numerous local joint broadcasting projects. Cihan also provided news and technical opportunities to over 100 foreign television channels. Some of the channels, which co-operated with Cihan were CNN International, BBC, NBC, MTV, CBS, ABC, Al-Jazeera, Abu Dhabi TV, ARD, ZDF, SAT 1, TF1, Canal +, RAI, TVE, Antena 3, TV2 Denmark, Nos Tv, MJTV, NTV Japan, KBS, NTV Russia, TV6, IRIB, MEGA Channel, Bloomberg, MSMBC, ANS, Lider Tv.

Cihan had 520 personnel working in 81 provinces and 284 counties of Turkey. Cihan News Agency had correspondents in Central Asia, the Middle East, the Balkan States, Europe, South America, Africa and the Far East, totaling 25 offices and 37 correspondents in different countries. Maintaining permanent offices in hot spots like Gaza, Arbil and Kabul, Cihan broadcast live and dispatched recordings from these countries to international media organisations.

Cihan News Agency also played a role during the last three elections in Turkey by providing results to the news channels.

== See also ==
- Media of Turkey
