= Tarık Toros =

Turkish journalist and television executive

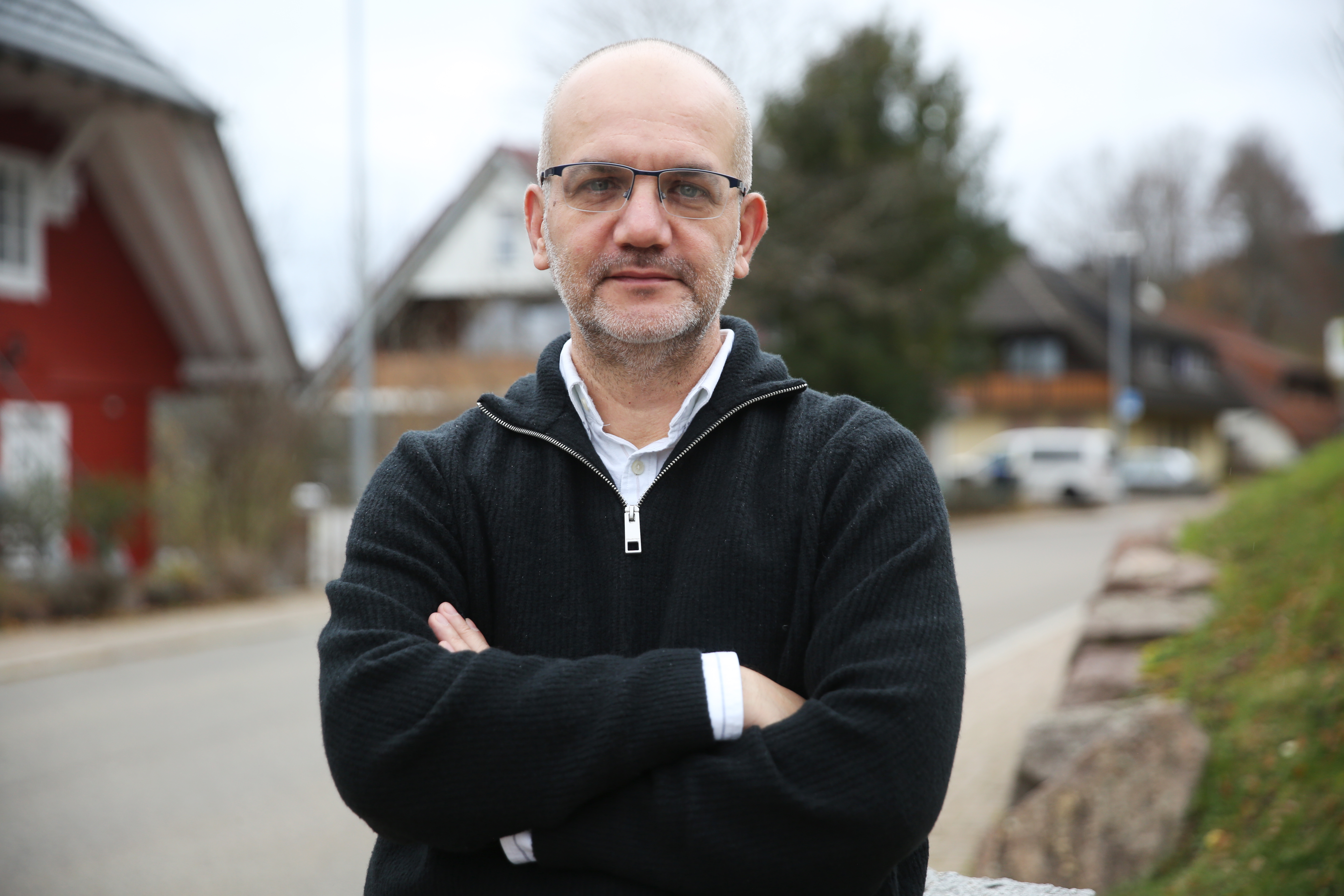
- Toros in 2025
- Born: 1972 (age 53–54); Turkey
- Occupations: Journalist, television executive
- Years active: 1990s–present

Tarık Toros (born 1972 in Turkey) is a Turkish journalist and television executive. He has held various roles in television journalism and has served in executive positions at nationally broadcasting media companies.

== Early life and education ==
Toros was born in 1972 in Turkey. After completing his primary and secondary education, he studied communications at university. He began his career in print journalism and later moved into television journalism.

== Career ==
During his media career, Toros worked for several television organizations. He was affiliated for many years with the Samanyolu Broadcasting Group and served as editor-in-chief of the news channel Samanyolu Haber TV.

He later became general manager of Bugün TV, which operated under Koza-İpek Holding. In 2015, he left his position following the appointment of a government trustee to the media companies.

== Digital media activities ==
After 2016, Toros began living outside Turkey. He has since continued his publishing and broadcasting activities through digital media, producing content on current affairs via social media platforms and video-sharing websites.
