= Ufuk Şanlı =

Turkish journalist and author

- Born: 1978 (age 47–48)
- Occupations: Journalist, author

Ufuk Şanlı (born 1978) is a Turkish journalist and author. He worked as a finance and economy reporter for various mainstream newspapers until 2016, when he was jailed as part of Turkish government's media purge following a coup attempt in Turkey. He received the Best Print News award in 2012 from the Turkish Association of Economy Reporters. In 2016, he wrote for Al-Monitor, where his latest column focused on Turkish president Recep Tayyip Erdoğan's increasing influence on Turkish media. Şanlı worked as an economy correspondent for various dailies such as Milliyet, Vatan and Sabah. He also hosted a program for the former financial news channel CNBC-E. His reporting mainly focused on economy and energy. He was the founding editor of Turkish daily Milliyet's financial news website Uzmanpara.

== Trial ==
In the wake of the attempted coup on 15 July 2016, Şanlı was detained and on 29 July 2016, he was jailed pending trial on charges of being a member of an armed terrorist organization. On March 8, 2018, an İstanbul court sentenced Şanlı to seven years and six months in prison. On 9 March 2018, the Organization for Security and Co-operation in Europe urged Turkey to release 25 media workers, of which Şanlı was part of. Various press freedom groups have condemned the crackdown on critical journalists. The Council of Europe lists Şanlı among 59 journalists in detention. On 13 August 2016, Erol Önderoğlu, Turkey representative of Reporters Without Borders, called for Şanlı's release in a Twitter message. The US newspaper Washington Post published an opinion piece by its editorial board on 9 March 2018 to condemn court sentences against 23 journalists including Şanlı.

== Bibliography ==
- Ufuk Şanlı (2002) Borç Kapanı: IMF "Ekonomik Savaşın Perde Arkası. Selis Yayınları
