= Hidayet Karaca =

Hidayet Karaca (b. 18 August 1963; Çankırı, Turkey ) was the general manager of the Samanyolu Media Group and chairman of the now-closed Samanyolu TV.

== About ==
Born on 18 August 1963 in Çankırı in Central Turkey, Karaca completed his primary, secondary and high school education in Istanbul. In 1983, he entered the Faculty of Engineering and Architecture in the Department of Mechanical Engineering at Dokuz Eylül University in Izmir, and did his master's degree there. He completed his PhD at Celal Bayar University. He worked as the Aegean Region Representative of Zaman Newspaper in Izmir. Later he worked as the Ankara Representative of the same newspaper for two years. From 1999 to 2016 he worked as the General Coordinator of the Samanyolu television channel (STV). He is a member of the High Council of the Press Council, chairman of the Board of the Television Broadcasters Association and a member of the Izmir Journalists Association.

== Lawsuit ==
Karaca was arrested on 19 December 2014 on charges of terrorism and membership of a group that conspired against the religious group Tahşiyeciler after Fethullah Gülen warned against them. An episode of a soap opera on Samanyolu TV also made allegations against the Tahşiveciler.

On 8 June 2018, the court sentenced Hidayet Karaca to aggravated life imprisonment for "attempting to overthrow the constitutional order" via the failed coup of 15 July 2016. He is detained in Silivri Prison as of 2025.

== Personal life ==
Hidayet Karaca is married and has two children.
