= Sızıntı =

Defunct Turkish magazine (1979–2016)

- Frequency: Monthly
- First issue: February 1979
- Final issue: 27 July 2016
- Company: Işık Yayincilik Ticaret A.S
- Country: Turkey
- Language: Turkish
- Website: Sızıntı

Sızıntı (lit. 'Ooze') was a monthly magazine trying to reconcile modern scientific thought with Islamic spirituality. It was published between 1979 and July 2016 in Turkey. Its English-language version is known as The Fountain. The magazine was started and operated by members of the Gülen movement, made up of the followers of the Turkish preacher and Islamic opinion leader Fethullah Gülen, and claims to bring together Islam and science by stressing the alleged "parallels" between modern scientific discoveries and literal verses from the Quran.

Sızıntı was closed down by the Turkish authorities on 27 July 2016.
