= Aksiyon =

- Editor: Idris Gürsoy
- Frequency: Weekly
- Total circulation: 40,000 (2009)
- First issue: 14 December 1994
- Company: Feza Publications
- Country: Turkey
- Language: Turkish
- Website: www.aksiyon.com.tr
- ISSN: 1300-8323
- OCLC: 35108061

Aksiyon (English: Action) was a Turkish news magazine. The magazine was close to the Gülen movement. It was established by Feza Publications in 1994. In 2008 it was described by its Today's Zaman sister newspaper as "the most widely read Turkish weekly magazine" (its nearly 40,000 circulation accounted for over half the weekly news magazine market). Its circulation had increased from around 15,000 in 2001. It broke some major stories including (May 1996) a secret military agreement between Turkey and Israel; and comments by Major Şefik Soyuyüce admitting the use of students to create a crisis in preparation for the 1960 Turkish coup d'état.

The magazine was shut down by the Turkish government due to alleged links to the Gülen movement after the 2016 Turkish coup attempt.

Past editors of Aksiyon were İbrahim Karayeğen (2002–2004), Mehmet Yılmaz (2004–2008), Bülent Korucu (from 2008), and the last editor Idris Gursoy (2016). Contributors included İdris Gürsoy and Zafer Özcan.

The magazine was a member of BPA Worldwide.
