= Fatih University =

Private university in Istanbul, Turkey

- Fatih Üniversitesi
- Type: Private university
- Active: 1996–23 July 2016
- Rector: Prof. Dr. Muhit Mert
- Location: Istanbul, Turkey; 41°5′31″N 28°37′25″E
- Campus: Suburb Bologna Process European Credit Transfer System Erasmus Exchange Programme TÜBİTAK YÖK
- Website: www.fatih.edu.tr

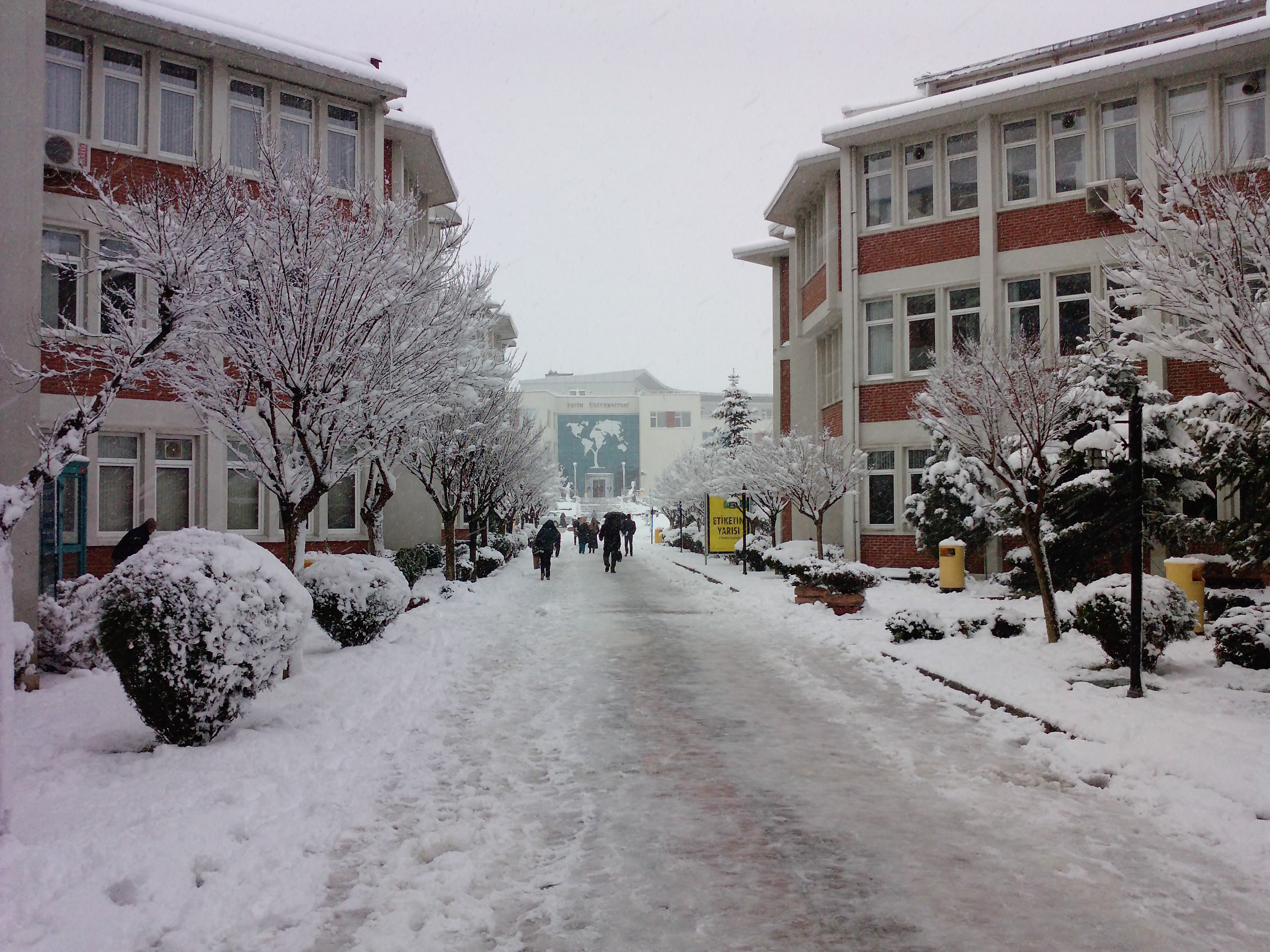
Educational buildings in winter

Fatih University (Turkish: Fatih Üniversitesi) was a leading private (foundation) university located in the metropolitan Büyükçekmece district of Istanbul, Turkey. Founded in 1996, the university was closed by the Turkish government along with 14 other universities after the failed coup attempt in July 2016 for alleged links to Gülen movement and is now a part of Istanbul University.

By URAP, Fatih University was ranked as one of the best private universities in Turkey, just behind Sabancı University, Bilkent University and Koç University. In the Academic Ranking of World Universities (ARWU), the university was ranked at 401-500th place in the subject area "Mathematics" for two consecutive years, 2017 and 2018.

Fatih University had a relatively high rate of international students (from 102 countries). The number of students getting education at the university was around fourteen thousand. English was the medium of instruction in most departments, and students were encouraged to learn an additional foreign language.

The university had two clinics and a hospital, a bionano technology lab and a biopetrol research and development center intensively working (besides regular research labs in departments). The university was established in 1996 by the Turkish Association of Health and Medical Treatment. The ninth President Süleyman Demirel was present at the formal inauguration of the University in November 1996.

The rector of Fatih University was Prof. Dr. Muhit Mert. Mustafa Özcan was the chairman of the board of trustees of the university.

== Academic branches ==
Fatih University had nine faculties:

- Faculty of Education,
- Faculty of Engineering,
- Faculty of Economics and Administrative Sciences,
- Faculty of Arts and Sciences,
- Faculty of Law,
- Faculty of Theology,
- Faculty of Fine Arts Design and Architecture,
- School of Medicine,
- Conservatory.

There were six graduate institutes (Institute of Science and Engineering, Institute of Bionanotechnology, Institute of Social Sciences, Institute of Medical Sciences, and Institute of Economics And Statistics), and three vocational schools located on three campuses.

The School of Medicine, School of Nursing, Vocational School of Medical Studies, and School of Vocational Studies were in Ankara until 2013. They had been moved to Istanbul as of 2013–2014 academic year.

- Research centers

- Atatürk Research Center
- Industrial Automation Technology Development and Liaison Investment Project
- BioNanoTechnology Research and Development Center
- Civilizations Research Center
- Turkish Language Teaching Research and Application Center
- Sema Medical Application and Research Hospital
