= Swedish Union of Journalists =

Trade union in Sweden

SJF
- Swedish Union of Journalists
- Journalistförbundet
- Founded: 1901
- Headquarters: Stockholm, Sweden
- Location: Sweden
- Members: 19,000
- Affiliations: TCO, IFJ
- Website: www.sjf.se

The Swedish Union of Journalists (Swedish: Journalistförbundet, SJF) is a trade union in Sweden. It is affiliated with the Swedish Confederation of Professional Employees and the International Federation of Journalists (IFJ).

In January 2023, the SFJ considered withdrawing from the IFJ due to disagreements over the role of Russian Union of Journalists (RUJ) following the invasion of Ukraine and that union's membership in the IFJ. While a number of Nordic unions did withdraw, the SFJ chose to remain affiliated to the IFJ due to the RUJ's suspension from the IFJ and need to maintain international linkages.

== Membership ==
The SJF has a membership of more than 19 000 members:

- 8,000 work at daily newspapers
- 2,300 at public radio and television
- 1,800 as freelancers
- 900 as information officers or editors of small membership papers
- 800 with magazines
- 500 with private commercial audiovisual companies
- 400 with political or specialized reviews

1,700 are retired members, 700 are students in journalism, and an additional 1,000 are unemployed.
