= Today's Zaman =

Periodical literature

- Type: Daily newspaper
- Format: Broadsheet
- Owner: Feza Publications
- Editor: Sevgi Akarcesme
- Founded: 2007
- Ceased publication: July 2016
- Headquarters: Bahcelievler, Istanbul, Turkey
- Website: www.todayszaman.com

Today's Zaman (Zaman is Turkish for 'time' or 'age') was an English-language daily newspaper based in Turkey. Established on 17 January 2007, it was the English-language edition of the Turkish daily Zaman. Today's Zaman included domestic and international coverage and regularly published topical supplements. Its contributors included cartoonist Cem Kızıltuğ.

On 4 March 2016, the government seized the newspaper and a state administrator was appointed to run Zaman as well as Today's Zaman despite protests by thousands. Since a series of corruption investigations went public on 17 December 2013 which targeted high ranking government officials, the Turkish government has been putting pressure on media organizations that are critical of it.

As of 9 March 2016, the website of Today's Zaman had not been updated since 5 March, while all archived articles prior to March 2016 were removed.

The journalist and writer Bülent Keneş, who was a co-founder of the newspaper and also served as its editor-in-chief, held this position until October 2015. He then handed over his role to journalist Sevgi Akarçeşme. Akarçeşme remained editor-in-chief until May 3, 2016.

On July 20, 2016, five days after the military coup attempt, Today's Zaman was shut down after an executive decree by President Recep Tayyip Erdogan; arrest warrants were issued for 47 former staff. Zaman was described by an official as the "flagship media organization" of the Gülen-led movement. CNBC described the newspaper as "what used to be Turkey's number one English daily" before its shutdown.
