= Zaman (newspaper) =

Turkish newspaper

- Typical Zaman front page
- Type: Daily newspaper
- Format: Berliner
- Owner: Feza Publications
- Editor-in-chief: Abdülhamit Bilici (October 2015 – 5 March 2016)
- Founded: 1986
- Ceased publication: 28 July 2016
- Political alignment: Before seizure: Gülen movement; After seizure: pro-government
- Language: Turkish
- Headquarters: Fevzi Çakmak Mah. A. Taner Kışlalı Cad. No:6; 34194 Bahçelievler
- City: Istanbul
- Country: Turkey
- Circulation: 1,200,000 (as of 2014) ▼2,424 (as of 4 April 2016)
- Website: www.zaman.com.tr

Zaman (Turkish: [zaˈman], literally "time" or "era"), sometimes stylized as ZAMAN, was a daily newspaper in Turkey. Zaman was a major, high-circulation daily before government seizure on 4 March 2016 (the circulation was around 650,000 as of February 2016). It was founded in 1986 and was the first Turkish daily to go online in 1995. It contained national (Turkish), international, business, and other news. It also had many regular columnists covering current affairs, interviews, and a culture section. The newspaper is known for its closeness to Fethullah Gülen, the leader of the Gülen movement. The newspaper originally supported the Justice and Development Party (AKP), but became increasingly critical of that party and its leader, Turkish president and former prime minister Recep Tayyip Erdoğan, particularly after the AKP closed the 2013 December investigation into corruption. On 4 March 2016, in what activists and international media groups criticized as another blow to press freedom in Turkey, control of the newspaper was seized by the government. The takeover was motivated by the newspaper's ties to the Hizmet movement of Turkish cleric Fethullah Gülen, which the government accuses of attempting to establish a parallel state in Turkey.

The newspaper was closed by the decree No. 668 which was published in the Official Gazette on 27 July 2016.

== Editions ==
Zaman was an Istanbul-based daily paper that also prints special international editions for some other countries. It was printed in 11 countries and distributed in 35 countries.

In addition to four locations in Turkey, regional editions were printed and distributed in Australia, Azerbaijan, Bulgaria, Germany, Romania, Kazakhstan, Kyrgyzstan, Macedonia, Turkmenistan, and the US. Zaman bureaus and correspondents are located in major world capitals and cities like Washington, D.C., New York City, Brussels, Moscow, Cairo, Baku, Frankfurt, Ashgabat, Tashkent, and Bucharest.

Special international editions were distributed in the native alphabets and languages of the countries they are published. Zaman has prints in 10 different languages including Kyrgyz, Romanian, Bulgarian, Azeri, Uzbek, Turkmen and Kazakh. Originally also having an English-language edition, since 16 January 2007, that role was taken over by the English-language daily newspaper Today's Zaman.

Zaman headquarters in Istanbul were supported by news bureaus in Ashgabat, Baku, Brussels, Bucharest, Frankfurt, Moscow, New York, and Washington, D.C. Zaman also appeared to have a large network of foreign journalists, especially in Russia and Central Asia.

== Current position and awards ==
As of 2008 its circulation was about 890,000, the highest in Turkey. The total paid circulation of Zaman was verified by an independent Media Auditing company, BPA Worldwide, after accusations that the newspaper was being handed out freely to gain market share. The audit report was released in March 2007, revealing that Zaman' circulation was 609,865 between Monday–Saturday, and 678,027 on Sundays, without any non-paid circulation. BPA audit figures also showed that Zaman had one of the largest subscriber bases of a national newspaper in Europe.

In May 2011, Zaman surpassed its 1 million subscription target. However some newspapers questioned the quality of the subscriptions, claiming that supporters of the paper's outlook had purchased multiple subscriptions of the newspaper in order to artificially inflate its circulation. The circulation of Zaman as of January 2014 was more than 1 million, while other newspapers saw mixed results between increase and decrease in circulation.

Zaman was awarded several times for its design, including Society for News Design (SND). Zaman's SND awards tally includes three in 2003, five in 2004, 2005, 2006, twenty in 2007, forty-two in 2008, and twenty-three in 2009.

== Staff ==
=== Editors-in-chief ===
When in March 2016 the newspaper was taken over by Turkish authorities, Abdülhamit Bilici, who had been editor-in-chief since October 2015, was deposed.

- 2001 – October 2015: Ekrem Dumanlı
- October 2015 – 5 March 2016: Abdülhamit Bilici

=== Columnists ===
The newspaper has attracted number of famous columnists both from liberal and conservative wings of thought.

A columnist had to resign from the newspaper on 3 December 2013 due to non-compliance with editorial line of opposing to the ruling party of Turkey and pressure from editors of the newspaper. The incident caused criticism of the newspaper as standing against freedom of expression.

== Online version ==
Zaman was the first Turkish newspaper to set up an online version, in 1995. Since then, the website has gone through several redesigns, the latest at the end of 2010, and is now positioned as a news portal.

== December 2014 crackdown ==
On 14 December 2014, Turkish police arrested more than two dozen senior journalists and media executives on charges of "forming, leading and being a member of an armed terrorist organization." Among those detained was the editor-in-chief of Zaman, Ekrem Dumanli. Police arriving at 7.30 a.m. at the newspaper's office were greeted by scores of protesters shouting "a free media cannot be silenced." They had mounted a vigil after tweets from "Fuatavni"—a reliable but anonymous source—had warned of the raid. Police retreated only to reappear in the afternoon when Dumanli gave himself up voluntarily.

A statement by the US State Department drawing attention to raids against media outlets "openly critical of the current Turkish government", cautioned Turkey not to violate its "own democratic foundations". EU foreign affairs chief Federica Mogherini and EU Enlargement Commissioner Johannes Hahn said that the arrests went "against European values" and "are incompatible with the freedom of media, which is a core principle of democracy".

On 19 December 2014, a court ordered that Dumanlı and seven others be released due to lack of evidence. Thousands gathered outside Çağlayan Courthouse in Istanbul to show support for the detained journalists and police officials. While crowds celebrated the release of Dumanlı in the courtyard of the courthouse, they protested the arrest order for Samanyolu TV General Manager Hidayet Karaca and former police chiefs Tufan Ergüder, Ertan Erçıktı and Mustafa Kılıçaslan.

The last front page of Zaman before the government takeover. It quotes Article 30 of the Constitution of Turkey: "A printing house, its annexes and press equipment duly established as a press enterprise under law shall not be seized, confiscated, or barred from operation on the grounds of being an instrument of crime."

== March 2016 government takeover ==
On 4 March 2016, the Turkish government seized control of Zaman. The government takeover occurred after a court order that was widely criticized by Zaman newspaper staff. After the takeover, the Zaman website was closed for two days with a message stating that the site was being updated. All archived news and content became inaccessible, with some claiming all the data had been wiped.

Two days later, the first government-controlled edition appeared, with no mention of the events during its seizure and with its front page carrying a series of pro-government articles and a picture of a smiling president Erdogan.

== See also ==
- Abdülhamit Bilici
- Media freedom in Turkey
- Zaman Vandaag
- Turkey's media purge after the failed July 2016 coup d'état
- Sevinç Özarslan
