= Esma Uludağ =

Turkish civil servant who died in exile in Greece in 2018

- Born: 19 September 1984; Turkey
- Died: 29 April 2018 (aged 33); Athens, Greece
- Cause of death: Stroke and brain hemorrhage resulting from physical exhaustion and traumas
- Occupations: Civil servant (former), teacher
- Known for: Subject of human rights documentation and symbol of post-2016 Turkish civil service purges

Esma Uludağ (19 September 1984 – 29 April 2018) was a former Turkish civil servant and educator who died in exile in Athens, Greece, shortly after fleeing judicial prosecution and state purges following the 2016 Turkish coup d'état attempt. Dismissed from her administrative role via an emergency decree (KHK), her flight across the Evros River with her three young children and her subsequent sudden death in Athens became a prominent case study on the humanitarian consequences of the post-coup crackdowns in Turkey.

== Early life, education, and career ==
Uludağ graduated with a degree in physics education and initially worked as a physics teacher. She later entered the public sector and was employed as a civil servant at the Karabağlar District Governorate (Kaymakamlık) in İzmir. Alongside her public service career and family life, she pursued further higher education, graduating first in her class from the Vocational School of Justice at Gediz University in June 2016, with stated ambitions to pursue a degree in law.

== Purge, dismissal, and prosecution ==
Following the July 2016 coup attempt, the Turkish government issued statutory emergency decrees (KHK) targeting individuals alleged to have ties with the Gülen movement. Uludağ was summarily dismissed from her position at the district governorate without administrative appeal mechanisms.

In addition to her dismissal, she faced police detention and judicial investigations under counterterrorism laws. Facing ongoing legal pressures and house raids, she and her husband Mehmet Ali Uludağ decided to leave Turkey with their three children.

== Flight to Greece ==
The family's attempt to cross the Turkish-Greek border was marked by four unsuccessful attempts. According to testimonies recorded by fellow asylum seekers, the family successfully crossed the Evros River on their fifth attempt, accompanied by IT specialist Sait Kılıç, who documented the journey.

After reaching Greece, the family registered their political asylum requests with Greek immigration authorities and settled in temporary housing in Athens while awaiting family reunification procedures with her husband in Germany.

== Life in exile and death ==
During their six and a half months in Athens, the family faced prolonged housing instability, moving residences eight times due to financial and logistical challenges.

On the evening of 26 April 2018, shortly after moving into their eighth residence, Uludağ suffered a stroke followed by a brain hemorrhage. Observers present, including refugee advocate Ayşen Albayrak, reported that emergency medical services (ambulance) arrived approximately 90 minutes after being summoned. She died on 29 April 2018. Medical reports attributed her death to cardiac and neurological complications triggered by severe chronic stress and physical exhaustion.

== Aftermath and legacy ==
Following her death, her children remained in Europe under their father's care. Her daughter's enrollment in local schooling in exile was reported by human rights outlets as part of ongoing coverage on the long-term integration of post-2016 Turkish refugees in Europe.

Uludağ's story was featured in a documentary short film released in April 2019, commemorating the anniversary of her death. Her personal effects are preserved by the Tenkil Memorial Center as part of an archive documenting post-coup purge victims.

== See also ==
- Gökhan Açıkkollu
- Halime Gülsu
- Purges in Turkey following the 2016 Turkish coup attempt
- Human rights in Turkey
