= Block of Wikipedia in Turkey =

Turkey's blockage of access to Wikipedia, 2017–2020

The Turkish Wikipedia logo with a censor bar covering the text

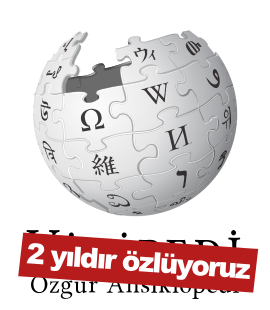
The logo displayed after the second anniversary of the ban, with the message "2 yıldır özlüyoruz" (English: "we've been missing it for two years")

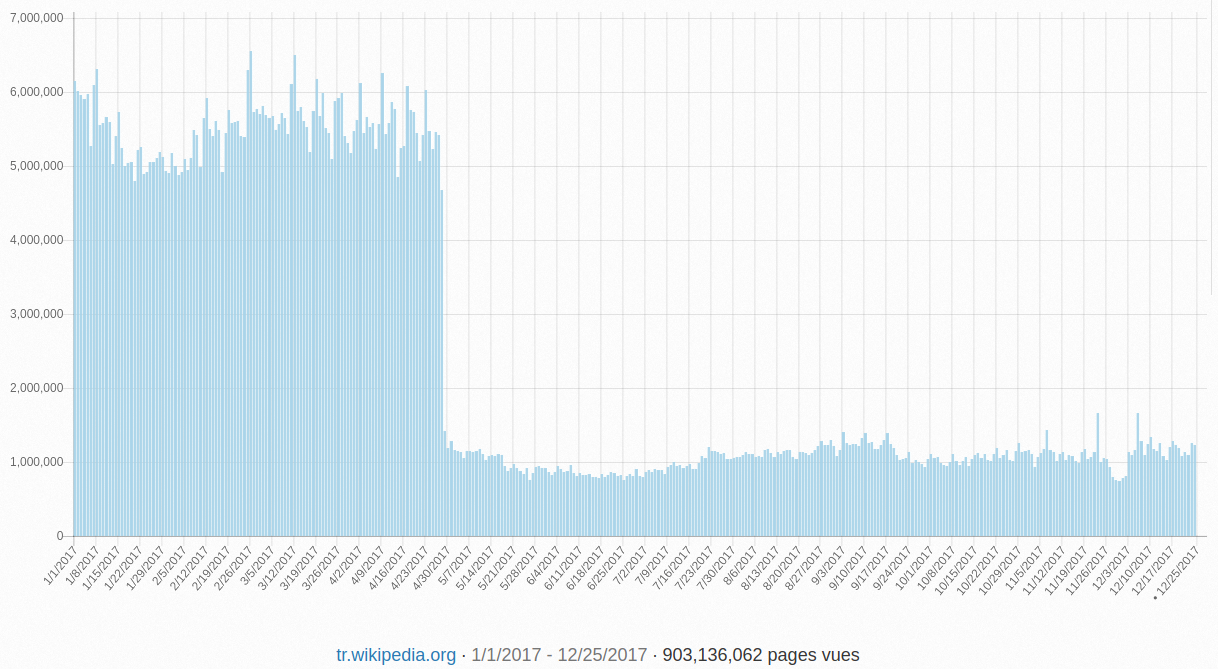
A graph of page views for the Turkish Wikipedia from February to May 2017 shows a great drop of roughly 80% immediately after the block was imposed. With Wikipedia's content being open, alternative websites continued to provide the information provided by the online encyclopedia to the public until the lifting of the ban in January 2020.

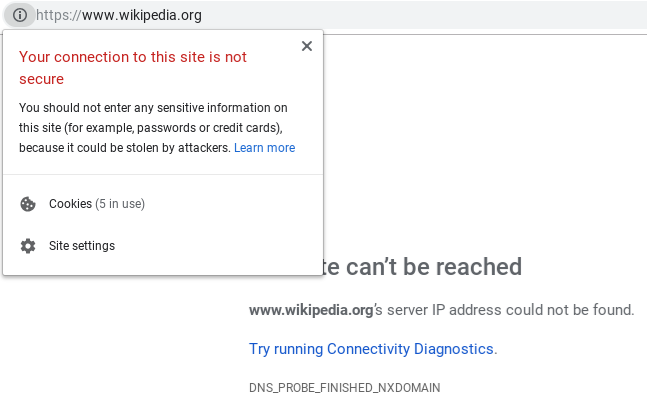
Error page when attempting to visit Wikipedia on the Chrome browser in Turkey during the ban. In addition, the browser says the connection is "not secure".

From 29 April 2017 to 15 January 2020, the online encyclopedia Wikipedia was blocked in Turkey. On 29 April 2017, Turkish authorities blocked online access to all its language editions throughout the country. The restrictions were imposed by Turkish Law No. 5651, due to the English version's article on state-sponsored terrorism (in the version of 29 April 2017), where Turkey was described as a sponsor country for the Islamic State and al-Qaeda. The Turkish Information and Communication Technologies Authority (ICTA) released a statement on its website that after technical analysis and legal consideration based on the Law Nr. 5651, measures have been taken for the website. Turkish courts viewed the article as a public manipulation of mass media. Requests by the ICTA to edit several articles to comply with Turkish law were not acted on.

Wikimedia Foundation Executive Director Katherine Maher said in May 2018 that the Foundation was "not sure why there is still a ban". In March 2018, Wikipedia's Facebook page started the "We Miss Turkey" (Turkish: Özledik) campaign and replaced the black censor bar over the Wikipedia logo with a red one. It also had an accompanying hashtag of the same name.

On 26 December 2019, the Constitutional Court of Turkey ruled that the block of Wikipedia violated human rights and ordered it to be lifted. On 15 January 2020, the block of Wikipedia in Turkey was lifted.

== Background ==
Some countries have faulted Turkey for funding Islamist rebel groups in Syria, including al-Qaeda's affiliate in Syria, the al-Nusra Front. In October 2014, U.S. Vice President Joe Biden said that Turkey, Saudi Arabia and the UAE had "poured hundreds of millions of dollars and tens of thousands of tons of weapons into anyone who would fight against Al-Assad".

The block occurred on 29 April 2017, two weeks after the Turkish constitutional referendum, which was held on 16 April.

On 25 April, Turkey conducted several airstrikes on YPG, YPJ, and PKK facilities in both Syria and Iraq (Sinjar). 40 militants, including five Peshmerga soldiers, were killed at Iraq's Sinjar Mountains, and more than 20 YPG and YPJ fighters were killed on Syria's Mount Karakoc. The Syrian Democratic Forces (SDF) threatened to withdraw from the operation to capture Raqqa if the United States did not take measures to stop Turkey's airstrikes against the group. In response, the US began to patrol the border alongside SDF troops in order to force a ceasefire between its two allies.

On 26 April, continuing the purges that started in 2016, 1,009 police officers were detained based on accusations of being secretly involved with the Gülenist network within the Turkish police force. 9,100 officers have been suspended. On 29 April, 3,974 more civil servants were dismissed. Media outlets and reporters were heavily targeted; 190 news organizations were banned and at least 120 journalists were imprisoned. Together with the ban of Wikipedia and television dating game shows, The New York Times described the moves as "an expand[ing] crackdown on dissent and free expression".

== Legal context ==
Law No. 5651, known as the Internet Act (IA), was enacted on 4 May 2007. The purpose of this law was described by the now-defunct Presidency of Telecommunication and Communication as follows: "There are two reasons for the law to be brought. The first reason: to determine the liability and the responsibility of collective use providers, access providers, location providers, and content providers, which are the main actors of the Internet. The other reason is to determine the procedures and fundamentals related to the specific crimes committed over the Internet and fighting these through content, location and access providers." More recently, the law has been used to censor individuals, journalists and the media. As of June 2017, at least 127,000 websites are estimated to have been blocked in Turkey, along with another 95,000 individual web pages. According to the 2018 Web Report of the Freedom of Expression Association (İfade Özgürlüğü Derneği) access to 245,826 websites was blocked in Turkey by the end of 2018, with access to a total of 54,904 websites and domain names blocked in 2018 alone.

== Block ==
On the morning of 29 April 2017, following news from Turkey Blocks that all language editions of Wikipedia had been blocked in Turkey, several websites published articles about the event. Reuters and the BBC reported that the Turkish authorities had blocked all access to Wikipedia in the country beginning at 5:00 AM GMT. Turkey's Information and Communication Technologies Authority simply stated: "After technical analysis and legal consideration based on the Law Nr. [sic] 5651 [governing the internet], an administrative measure has been taken for this website." Users reported that they could only access Wikipedia using tools such as private VPNs.

Deep packet inspection was one of the methods used to block access to Wikipedia.

== Rationale and demands ==
Voice of America reported that Turkish media had explained the block was a result of "terror-related content". Referring to an email statement made by the Transport, Maritime Affairs and Communications Ministry, Turkish News source Anadolu Agency reported that the block was due to its articles and comments describing Turkey's alleged involvement with terror groups. The ministry said, "Instead of coordinating against terrorism, it has become part of an information source which is running a smear campaign against Turkey in the international arena."

After court objection by Istanbul Bilgi University professor Yaman Akdeniz, the Ankara 2nd Civil Court of Peace said that the causes of the block were the following articles on the English Wikipedia:

- State-sponsored terrorism § Turkey
- Foreign involvement in the Syrian Civil War § Turkey

On 11 May 2017, Turkish Transport Minister Ahmet Arslan cited Wikipedia's featuring "content creating a perception that Turkey is supporting terrorist organizations" as a reason for the block.

According to a BBC report, the Hürriyet daily newspaper said that Ankara had asked Wikipedia to remove the offending content, adding that the access ban would be lifted if Wikipedia met Turkey's demands. Later in the day, the provisional "administrative measure" was replaced by a court order, issued by the Ankara 1st Criminal Court of Peace, blocking Wikipedia as a "protective measure".

According to a report by the Anadolu Agency, the country "has a history of demanding that international websites take such steps as having a representative office in the country, complying with principles of international law, implementing court rulings, and not being part of any smear campaign or operation in Turkey".

On 3 May 2017, the Wikimedia Foundation submitted an objection to the block to Ankara's 1st Penal Court of Peace, but it was rejected by the court on 5 May. The ruling stated that the country-wide block would continue as the "offending" pages had not been removed. The head of Turkey's Information and Communication Technologies Authority, Omer Fatih Sayan, explained: "It is not possible to open access to Wikipedia so long as the decisions are not implemented." The same day, the Information and Communication Technologies Authority (BTK) published the following official statement:

- Despite all the efforts, the content that falsely claims Turkey's support for terrorist organizations was not removed from Wikipedia.
- This content was not allowed to be edited with accurate information.
- Since Wikipedia broadcasts in HTTPS protocol, it is technically impossible to filter by individual URLs to block only relevant content.
- Therefore, the entire Wikipedia content had to be filtered.
- Wikipedia editors must do what is necessary for this and similar content.

== Withdrawal of Jimmy Wales' invitation ==
On 2 May 2017, Istanbul Municipality removed Jimmy Wales, the founder of Wikipedia, from the guest list at the World Cities Expo event on smart cities to be held in the city from 15 to 18 May 2017, making the following announcement: "Wikipedia founder Jimmy Wales was disinvited [sic] from the 'World Cities Expo Event' and the decision has been communicated to him. Respectfully announced to the public." Wales had hoped to attend despite the Wikipedia block, commenting: "I am looking forward to the visit. Istanbul is one of my favorite cities."

== Reactions ==
In Turkey, Republican People's Party (CHP) parliamentarians criticized the block, with Eren Erdem stating that the ban puts "Turkey in line with North Korea" and Barış Yarkadaş calling it "censorship and a violation of the right to access information". In a tweet made on the first day of the block, Wikipedia co-founder Jimmy Wales expressed his support for those criticizing the decision as censorship, saying "Access to information is a fundamental human right. Turkish people I will always stand with you to fight for this right." The Wikimedia Foundation, which runs Wikipedia, stated that it was committed to keeping the site available in Turkey and pushing for a "judicial review" of the decision.

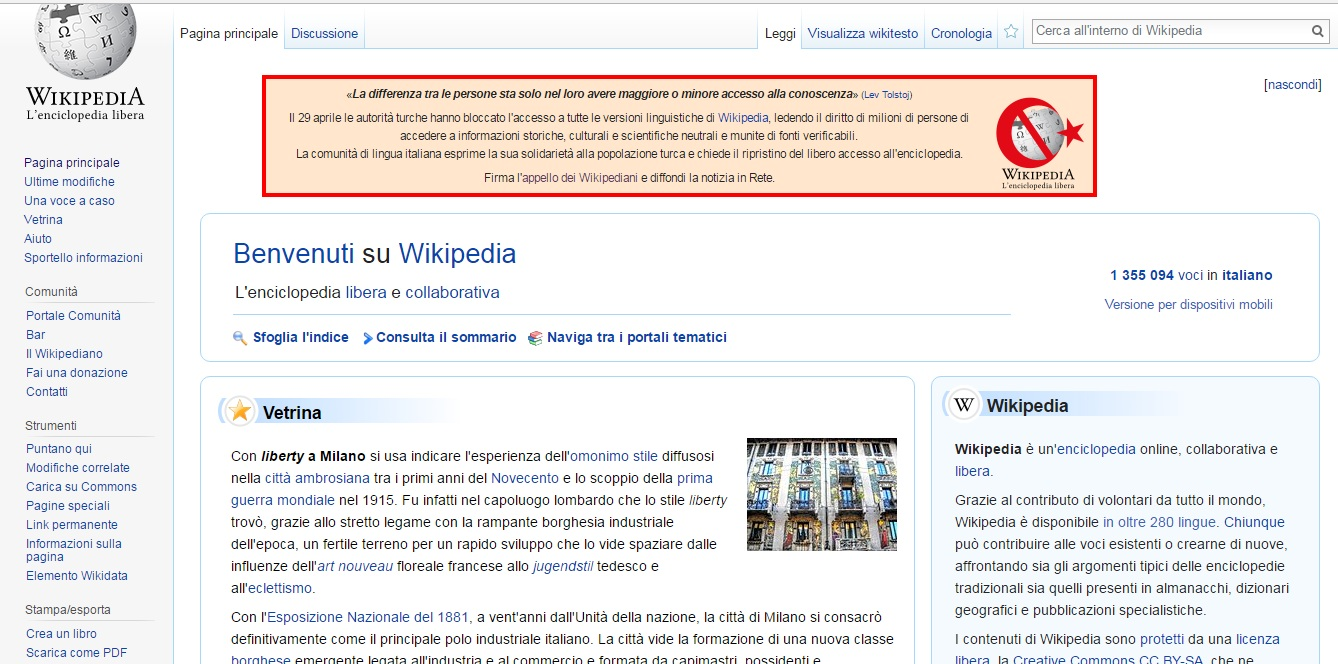
Italian Wikipedia against Turkey's censorship

On 9 January 2018, Republican People's Party deputy Sezgin Tanrıkulu submitted a written parliamentary question regarding the block of Wikipedia, saying that it was against the Turkish constitution and European Convention on Human Rights, and that "the block should be partial according to Turkish laws". Minister of transport, maritime and communication Ahmet Arslan denied that Wikipedia was blocked completely and stated that the Wikipedia block was just partial due to Article 22 of the Constitution of Turkey and Article 10 of the European Convention on Human Rights.

NDTV said that the move caused strong reactions on social media against the decision to deny access to "one of the world's most popular websites".

Six months into the block, Wikimedia Foundation Communication Director Juliet Barbara published an article about the efforts to remove the access ban.

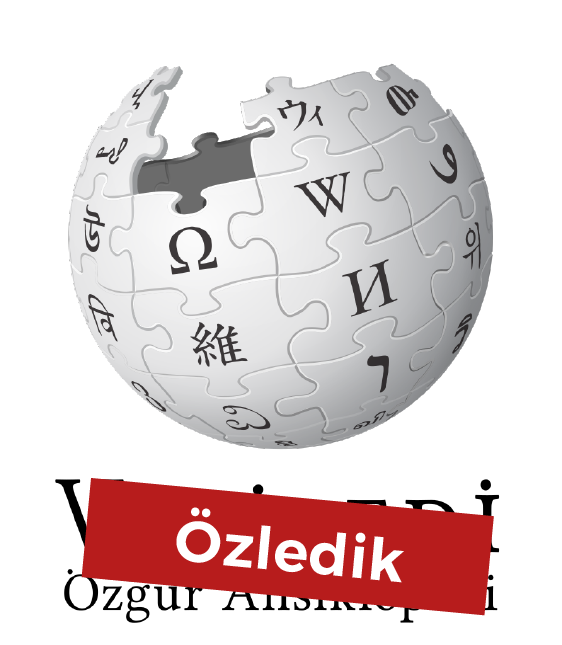
The logo that was used on the Turkish Wikipedia following the #WeMissTurkey campaign

A year and a day into the block, on 30 April 2018, Good Party, in a reference to the 2018 Turkish general election, vowed to host the "reopening of Wikipedia" with "all of Turkey's citizens" on the day after snap elections on 24 June.

Muharrem İnce, CHP's presidential candidate for the 2018 Turkish presidential election, also vowed to reopen Wikipedia during one of his campaign speeches on 22 May 2018. However, the election was won by the incumbent, Recep Tayyip Erdoğan.

== Circumvention ==
=== Reading ===
Viewing Wikipedia content was possible with use of VPNs. Alternatively the Turkish- and English-language mirror website TurkceWiki.org, which is unaffiliated with the Wikimedia Foundation, was among several Wikipedia mirrors available to Turkish users unable to access Wikipedia. This mirror site, nevertheless, omitted the "offending" sections that the Turkish authorities wanted removed from Wikipedia and some features such as the left sidebar.

Activists also created a copy of Turkish Wikipedia on the InterPlanetary File System (IPFS)—a way of addressing web content which the Turkish government could not block due to its usage of decentralized open-source technology.

=== Editing ===
As of 2019, it was possible to update Wikipedia by evading the block with one of the virtual private networks (VPNs) which are not blocked and thus a domain name server (DNS) outside Turkey. An IP block exemption from Wikipedia was also required.

== Litigation ==
Both the Wikimedia Foundation as well as some users (academics and activists Yaman Akdeniz and Kerem Altıparmak) of the platform challenged the blocking decision of the Ankara 1st Criminal Judgeship of Peace. All the appeals were rejected by the Ankara 2nd Criminal Judgeship of Peace. Therefore the initial blocking decision became final. Following this, the Wikimedia Foundation as well as the academics Yaman Akdeniz and Kerem Altıparmak lodged separate individual applications with the Constitutional Court of Turkey. Unlike in previous applications involving the Twitter and YouTube platforms, the Constitutional Court did not issue a swift judgment and for almost 2.5 years there was no development whatsoever involving the individual applications lodged with the Constitutional Court.

Because of the delays, in May 2019, the Wikimedia Foundation filed an application with the European Court of Human Rights (ECHR), stating that the ban was "a violation of the right to freedom of expression". The Foundation was represented by English barrister Can Yeğinsu and Turkish attorney Gönenç Gürkaynak In July 2019, the Wikimedia Foundation published a post on their social media accounts, announcing that the ECHR had expedited the case. Later in August, the ECHR announced that it had given Turkey until the end of October to justify the ban. The Constitutional Court of Turkey (AYM) weighed in on the issue on 11 September 2019 to decide whether the ban was in violation of freedom of expression or not. A pro-government journalist later stated that the court had considered rescinding the ban. At the end of October, the ECHR gave Turkey an additional six weeks to work on any potential justification that they might have for this ban. On 25 November 2019, Dunja Mijatović, the European Commissioner for Human Rights, declared the blocking "unacceptable in a democratic society and not compatible with Article 10 of the European Convention on Human Rights which protects freedom of expression". The General Assembly of the Constitutional Court of Turkey announced that the case would be reviewed on 26 December 2019 during their meeting. On 26 December 2019, the court ruled in a 10–6 vote that the block of Wikipedia violated the freedom of expression and ordered it to be lifted immediately.

The ICTA announced that they would open the site after the court's decision, however, Yaman Akdeniz, a law professor and one of the applicants in the Wikipedia case from Istanbul Bilgi University, said that a full opinion "most likely [needed] to be published" before the ban was lifted. The Turkish government was expected to submit its written observations to the ECHR in January 2020.

On 24 March 2022, after Wikipedia was unblocked in Turkey, the ECHR dismissed the case of Wikipedia's block.

== Restoration of access ==
"Welcome back" speech by Katherine Maher, executive director of the Wikimedia Foundation

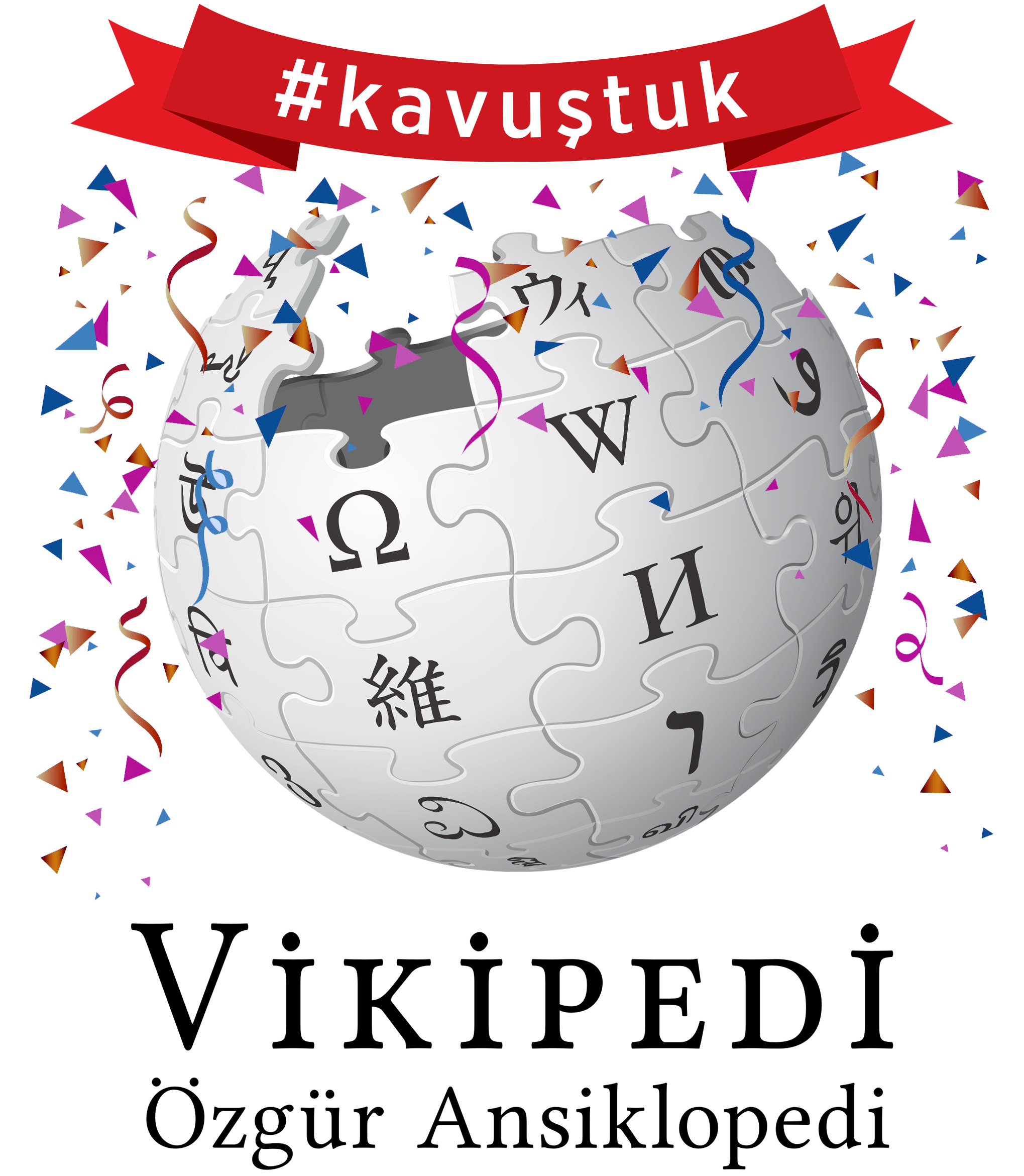
Turkish Wikipedia logo following the lifting of the block with the message "kavuştuk" (English: "reunited")

After the Constitutional Court's decision in December 2019, overruling the initial ban, Turkish authorities granted users access to Wikipedia on late 15 January 2020 (Wikipedia's 19th birthday). The decision was officially announced on T.C. Resmî Gazete on the same day.

On 26 December 2019, Jimmy Wales, the co-founder of Wikipedia, celebrated the decision by tweeting "Welcome back, Turkey!" with a photo of the Turkish flag.

On 16 January 2020, the Wikimedia Foundation issued a press release which included the following statement:

We are thrilled that the people of Turkey will once again be able to participate in the largest global conversation about the culture and history of Turkey online and continue to make Wikipedia a vibrant source of information about Turkey and the world

— Wikimedia Foundation, press release (16 January 2020)

Hürriyet, a prominent newspaper of Turkey, wrote "Wikipedia is finally free". A well-known TV host Ahmet Hakan, who is often criticized for his pro-government views, said "the only thing I do not understand is this: why would anyone be bothered by Wikipedia being free?"

While the website was blocked, the number of Turkish articles continued to grow. Before the block in April 2017, the number of Turkish articles in Wikipedia was 289,314. By the time of the Constitutional Court's decision in January 2020, it had reached 338,882 articles. This shows that during the block of 2.5 years, approximately 49,000 articles were created in Wikipedia either through different circumvention methods or by Turkish speakers who live elsewhere.

== See also ==
- Censorship in Turkey
  - Internet censorship in Turkey
  - Turkey's media purge after the failed July 2016 coup d'état
- List of media outlets shut down in the 2016 Turkish purges
- List of arrested journalists in Turkey
- Internet censorship circumvention
- Block of Wikipedia in Venezuela
