= Turkish Wikipedia =

Turkish-language edition of Wikipedia

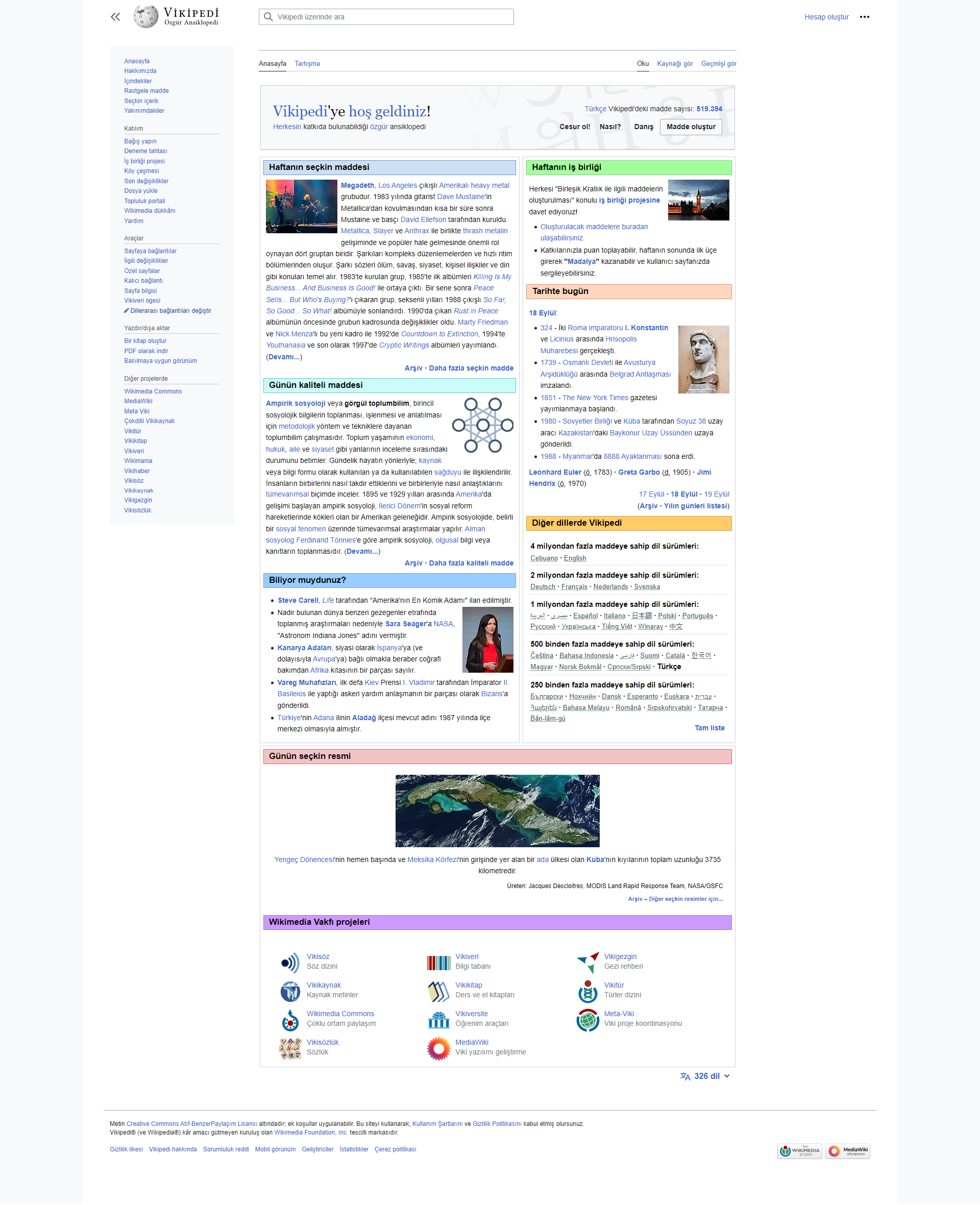
- Screenshot Main Page of the Turkish Wikipedia in September 2022
- Website type: Internet encyclopedia project
- Available in: Turkish
- Headquarters: San Francisco, California
- Owner: Wikimedia Foundation
- Website: tr.wikipedia.org
- Commercial: No
- Registration: Optional
- Launched: 5 December 2002; 23 years ago
- Current status: Active.
- Content license: Creative Commons Attribution/ Share-Alike 4.0 (most text also dual-licensed under GFDL); Media licensing varies

The Turkish Wikipedia (Turkish: Türkçe Vikipedi) is the Turkish language edition of Wikipedia, spelled Vikipedi. Started on December 5, 2002, as of 29 September 2026, this edition has 701,486 articles and is the 27th largest Wikipedia edition, and ranks 16th in terms of depth among Wikipedias. Turkish Wikipedia has around 3 billion pageviews each year.

In March 2017, before the block of Wikipedia in Turkey, 90% of pageviews of Turkish Wikipedia were from within the country. Germany was second with 2% share, as there are many Turks in Germany. Azerbaijan was the third country with 1.4% share, as Turkish and Azerbaijani are mutually intelligible Oghuz languages. Although the block was lifted in 2020, statistics for pageviews in Turkey and most other Turkic speaking countries are no longer published; but those for some countries; such as Kyrgyzstan, Germany and the United States are.

== History ==
In 2006, the Turkish Wikipedia was nominated under the Science category for Altın Örümcek Web Ödülleri (Golden Spider Web Awards), which are commonly known as the "Web Oscars" for Turkey. In January 2007, the Turkish Wikipedia was given the award for "Best Content" in this competition. The award was given in a ceremony on 25 January 2007 at Istanbul Technical University.

In 2015, its banner drawing attention to the gender bias on Wikipedia drew the attention of the Turkish media.

On 29 April 2017, the Turkish government blocked access to Wikipedia, "due to its articles and comments showing Turkey in coordination and aligned with various terrorist groups". While the exact articles were not revealed, some believe that the encyclopedia had been blocked due to the Turkish government's concerns about articles critical of its actions regarding Turkey's involvement in the Sryian Civil War. In December 2019, the Constitutional Court of Turkey ruled that the ban violated freedom of expression. On 15 January 2020, the ban was lifted after 991 days.

=== Accuracy and updates ===
Experienced editors have been criticised for being unfriendly to new editors, and for being slow to correct misinformation.

== Statistics ==
Number of articles in the Turkish Wikipedia by years

As of 2024, the Wikimedia Foundation says about Türkiye, as well as 7 other countries:

These countries and territories are at higher risk of action being taken against Wikimedia community members for on-platform activities. The Wikimedia Foundation can publish aggregated data about them only using differential privacy such that any consumer of the data will be (in the worst case) at most 2.5% more certain about a data subject's presence or absence in the dataset.

The censored variation of the logo used during the site block by Turkey

== Milestones ==
- January 2004 — 100 articles
- 15 July 2004 — 1,000 articles
- 10 November 2005 — 10,000 articles
- 3 February 2008 — 100,000 articles
- 9 December 2012 — 200,000 articles
- 13 October 2017 — 300,000 articles
- 27 April 2021 — 400,000 articles
- 8 July 2022 — 500,000 articles
- 6 April 2024 — 600,000 articles
- 10 September 2026 — 700,000 articles
