= Purges in Turkey following the 2016 Turkish coup attempt =

2016–present purges in Turkey
- Part of AKP–Gülen movement conflict
- Purges in Turkey following the 2016 Turkish coup attempt (Turkey)
- Date: 16 July 2016 – present (disputed) (10 years, 3 months, 2 weeks and 3 days)
- Location: Nationwide; cities with high civil servant populations (Ankara, Istanbul)
- Status: Ongoing: Over 160,000 judges, teachers, police and civil servants suspended or dismissed, together with about 3,000,000 tried for terrorism charges and 527,000 formally arrested.

Parties
Government of Turkey; Ministry of National Defense; Turkish Armed Forces; Turkish Land Forces; Turkish Air Force; Turkish Naval Forces; Special Forces Command; Ministry of the Interior; Turkish Gendarmerie; JİTEM; General Directorate of Security; Riot Police; Police Special Operation Department; Ministry of Foreign Affairs	Gülen movement; Stated supporters of Fethullah Gülen in civil service, education, journalism, judiciary and military; Peace at Home Council; Gülen movement and PKK supporters; Later extended to opposition HDP and DEM Party supporters

Lead figures
(Turkey) Recep Tayyip Erdoğan; (Turkey) Cevdet Yılmaz; (Turkey) İbrahim Kalın; Mustafa Çiftçi; Yaşar Güler; Selçuk Bayraktaroğlu; Metin Tokel; Ercüment Tatlıoğlu; Ziya Cemal Kadıoğlu; Ali Çardakcı; Ömer Ertuğrul Erbakan; Ali Fidan; Former: (Turkey) Abdullah Gül; (Turkey) Binali Yıldırım; (Turkey) Fuat Oktay; (Turkey) Hakan Fidan; Ali Yerlikaya; Süleyman Soylu; Efkan Ala; Hulusi Akar; Nurettin Canikli; Fikri Işık; Hulusi Akar; Ümit Dündar; Yaşar Güler; Musa Avsever; Metin Gürak; Salih Zeki Çolak; Yaşar Güler; Ümit Dündar; Musa Avsever; Selçuk Bayraktaroğlu; Bülent Bostanoğlu; Adnan Özbal; Abidin Ünal; Hasan Küçükakyüz; Atilla Gülan; Galip Mendi; İbrahim Yaşar; Yaşar Güler; Arif Çetin; Zekai Aksakallı; Ahmet Ercan Çorbacı; Mehmet Celalettin Lekesiz; Selami Altınok; Celal Uzunkaya; Mehmet Aktaş; Erol Ayyıldız; Mahmut Demirtaş	Fethullah Gülen #; Adil Öksüz; Akın Öztürk (POW); Mehmet Dişli (POW); Adem Huduti (POW) (alleged); Semih Terzi † (alleged); Bekir Ercan Van (POW) (alleged); İrfan Kızılaslan (POW) (alleged)

Units involved
(Turkey) Loyalists of the Turkish Armed Forces; (Turkey) National Intelligence Organization; (Turkey) Turkish parliament; Judiciary in Turkey; (Turkey) National Police	

Casualties and losses
None	According to official statements by Turkish government, by July 2024 more than 700,000 people have been investigated on terror related charges due to alleged ties to the Gülen group. According to the media outlet Independent Turkey the number of people investigated for terrorism is estimated to be 2 million since 2016.; 300,000 arrested or detained, 150,000 dismissed from government jobs (nearing 10% of public employees): By 20 Jul 2016, 15,846 were detained (10,012 soldiers, 1,481 judiciary members); 8,133 of the detained had been arrested; 15 universities, 1,043 private schools, 1,229 charities and foundations, 19 trade unions, 35 medical institutions, 16 television channels, 23 radio stations, 45 daily newspapers, 15 magazines and 29 publishing houses were shut down.

Since 2016, the government of Turkey has conducted a series of purges, enabled by a state of emergency in reaction to the failed coup attempt on 15 July that year. The purges began with the arrest of Turkish Armed Forces personnel reportedly linked to the coup attempt, but arrests were expanded to include other elements of the Turkish military, civil servants, and private citizens. Later actions reflected a power struggle between secularist and Islamist political elites in Turkey, which affected people who were not active in nor aware of the coup but who the government claimed were connected with the Gülen movement, an opposition group which the government blamed for the coup. Possession of books authored by Gülen was considered valid evidence of such a connection and cause for arrest.

Tens of thousands of public servants and soldiers were purged in the first week following the coup. For example, on 16 July 2016, one day after the coup was foiled, 2,745 judges were dismissed and detained. This was followed by the dismissal, detention or suspension of over 100,000 officials, a figure that had increased to over 110,000 by early November 2016, over 125,000 after the 22 November decree, reaching at least 135,000 with the January decrees, about 160,000 after the suspensions and arrests decree of April 29 and 300,000 by February 2025. Collectively about 10% of Turkey's 2 million public employees were removed as a result of the purges. Purged citizens are prevented from working again for the government, which has led in many cases to destitution.

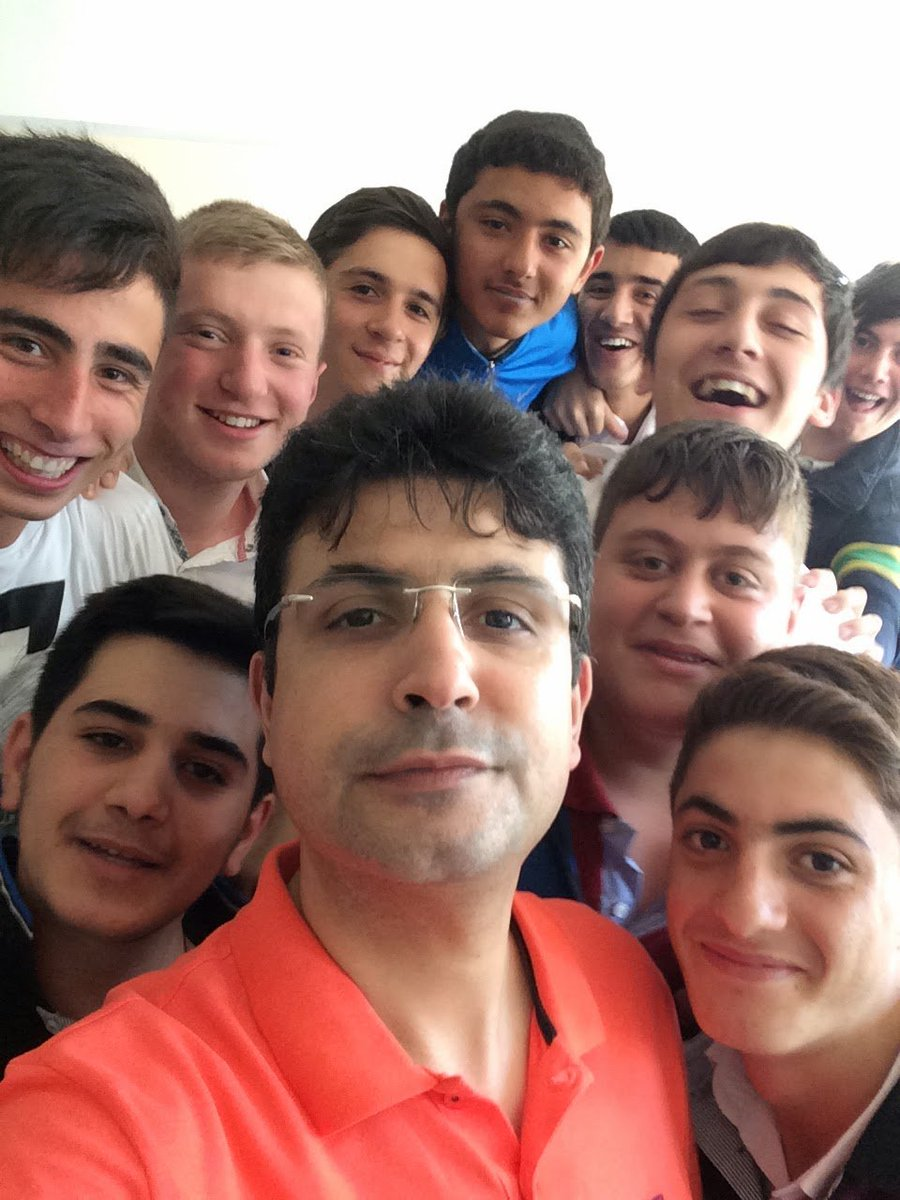
Gökhan Açıkkollu, a teacher from a Gülen-affiliated school, died in police custody after being imprisoned and tortured for 13 days post 2016 coup attempt.

In the business sector, the government forcefully seized assets of over a thousand companies, worth between $11 billion and $50–60 billion, on the charge of being related to Gülen and the coup. Goods and services produced by such companies were subject to boycott by the public.

The purges also extend to the media, with television channels, newspapers and other media outlets that were seen as critical of the government being shut down, critical journalists being arrested and Wikipedia being blocked, from April 2017 to January 2020. Since September 2016, the post-coup emergency state extended to purging Kurdish groups, including the dismissal of over 11,000 Kurdish teachers and dozens of elected mayors and arrest of the co-chairs of the Peoples' Democratic Party (HDP) for alleged links with the Kurdistan Workers' Party (PKK). In August 2018, the Turkish Parliament approved a new "anti-terror" law to replace the state of emergency.

== Background ==
In January 2014, during a major corruption inquiry in Turkey, 96 judges and prosecutors, including the chief prosecutor of İzmir, Huseyin Bas, were transferred to new locations, ending the investigations. Bas was transferred to Samsun. Altogether 120 judges and prosecutors were reassigned. At the time, The Daily Telegraph described the events as "the biggest purge of the judiciary in [Turkey's] history". From 2014 to mid-2016, repeated purges of civilian, military and judicial officials took place in Turkey, mainly aimed at followers of Fethullah Gülen, a former colleague of the Turkish President Recep Tayyip Erdoğan.

== Sectors affected ==
During the first post-coup speech Erdoğan could address to the nation upon landing at Atatürk airport, he said, "This uprising is a gift from God to us because this will be a reason to cleanse our army".

An extensive purge of the Turkish civil service began with Erdoğan warning his opponents that "they will pay a heavy price for this." The New York Times described the purges as a "counter-coup" and expected Erdoğan to "become more vengeful and obsessed with control than ever, exploiting the crisis not just to punish mutinous soldiers but to further quash whatever dissent is left in Turkey".

On 18 July, U.S. Secretary of State John Kerry urged Turkish authorities to halt the increasing crackdown on its citizens, indicating that the crackdown was meant to "suppress dissent". French Foreign Minister and former Prime Minister Jean-Marc Ayrault voiced concern, warning against a "political system which turns away from democracy".

The United Nations have been reported as failing to condemn the coup and resulting violence, due to disagreement between Egypt and other Security Council members on the wording of a resolution in that direction.

=== Military ===
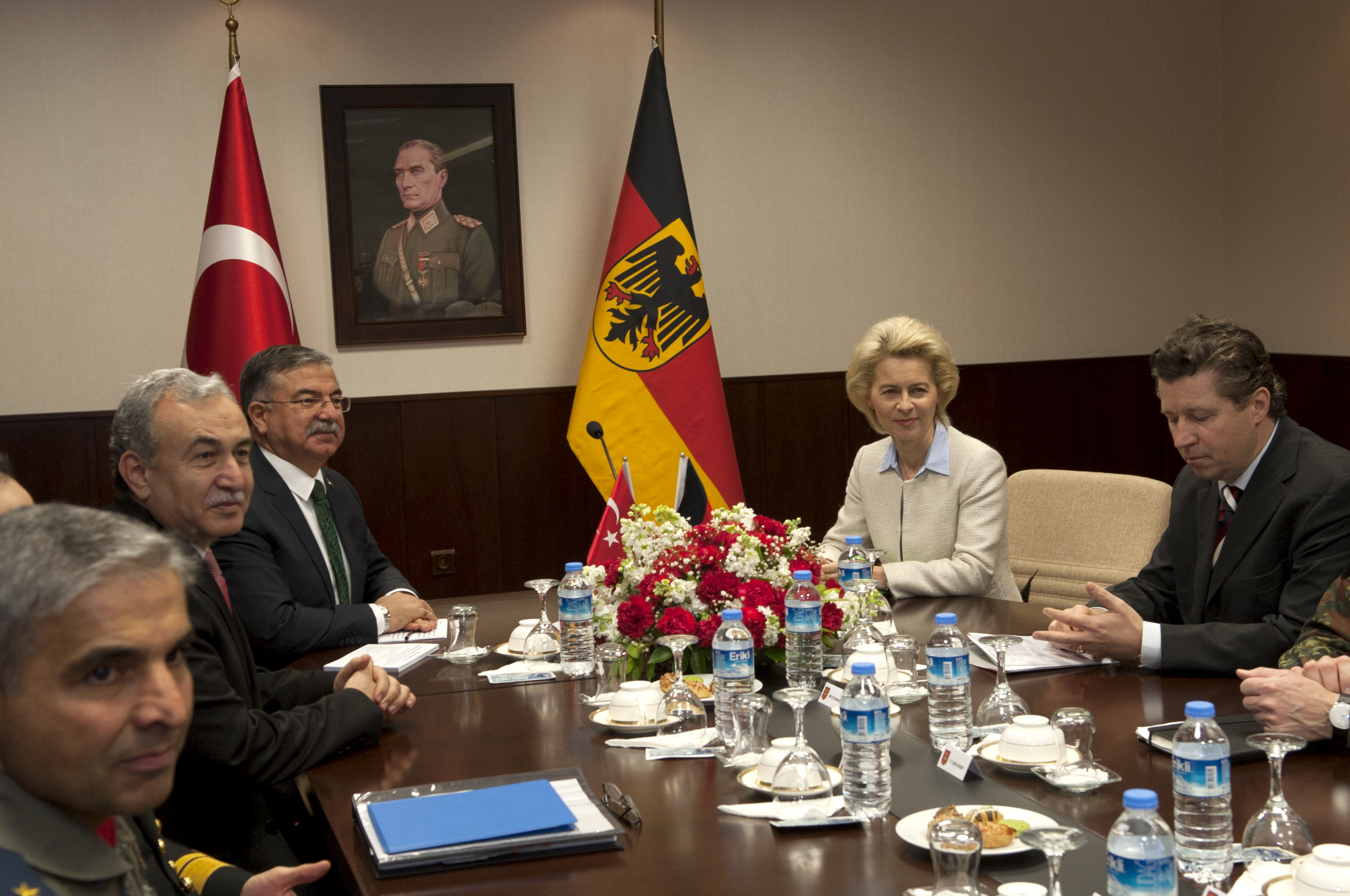
General Bekir Ercan Van (far left), the commander of Incirlik Air Base, was accused of complicity in the attempted coup.

Prime Minister Binali Yıldırım announced on 16 July 2016 that 2,839 soldiers of various ranks had been arrested. Among those arrested were at least 34 generals or admirals. A number of students of the Kuleli Military High School, enough to fill five buses, were also arrested. By 18 July 2016, a total of 103 generals and admirals have been detained by Turkish authorities in connection with the coup.

Yasemin Özata Çetinkaya, the governor of Sinop Province, was removed from her duty and her husband, a colonel in the Turkish army, arrested. Turkish military conducted a raid on the Turkish Air Force Academy in Istanbul as well.

Major General Cahit Bakir, who commanded Turkish forces under NATO in Afghanistan, and Brigadier General Sener Topuc, responsible for education and aid in Afghanistan, have been detained by authorities in Dubai in connection with Turkey's failed coup.

General Bekir Ercan Van, the commander of Incirlik Air Base, which the U.S. uses to carry out airstrikes against ISIL, was arrested by Turkish authorities for his stated role in plotting the failed military coup. He sought asylum from the United States but was denied.

On Feb 15th 2025 Erhan Afyoncu, a high-ranking official of government, admitted that many dismissed personnel were not directly linked to the coup attempt. He attributed the dismissals to intelligence reports and a software program named "Fetometre" (which translates as "FETO"-meter) targeting perceived Erdogan critics, suggesting widespread profiling rather than evidence-based removals.

=== Police and judiciary ===
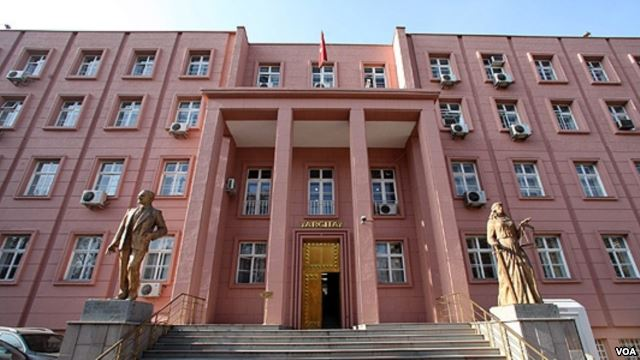
The building of the Turkish Court of Cassation in Ankara

On 16 July 2016, the Supreme Board of Judges and Prosecutors of Turkey (HSYK) removed 2,745 Turkish judges from duty and ordered their detention. Of these judges, 541 were in administrative judiciary and 2,204 were in criminal judiciary. This amounted to approximately 36% of all judges in Turkey at the time. Two judges from the Constitutional Court of Turkey, Alparslan Altan and Erdal Tercan, were detained by Turkish authorities for stated ties with the Gülen movement, while 5 members of the HSYK had their membership revoked and 10 members of the Turkish Council of State were arrested on charges of being members of the parallel state. Furthermore, arrest warrants were issued for 48 members of the Council of State and 140 members of the Court of Cassation.

By 18 July 2016, the Turkish government had suspended 8,777 government officials across the country for stated links to the coup perpetrators. Among those suspended include 7,899 police officers, 614 gendarmerie officers, 47 district governors and 30 regional governors. As of 19 July 2016, 755 judges and prosecutors had been arrested in relation to the coup attempt.

In January 2019, former chairman of Turkey's Judges and Prosecutors Association (YARSAV), recipient of human rights awards and judge Murat Arslan have been condemned to 10 years in prison for "participation to a terrorist organisation". No violent action or call for violence was reported, the statement being based on an anonymous denunciation and the presence of ByLock on his smartphone, an application he denies having installed on his phone.

=== Politics ===
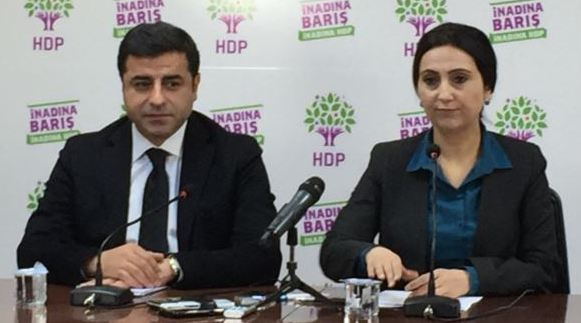
Opposition politicians Selahattin Demirtas and Figen Yüksekdağ had been arrested on terrorism charges.

Following the July 2016 attempt coup and first purges of the military, the Turkish government used the state of emergency to introduce amendments into Turkey's municipalities law. Articles 45 and 57 were introduced, which allow to remove an elected mayor from his duty. Before only a final conviction was reason enough to remove a mayor. Hüseyin Avni Mutlu, ex-governor of İstanbul, was dismissed on 19 July 2016. Deputy Mayor of Istanbul's Şişli District, Cemil Candaş (tr), was shot in the head in his office by an unidentified assailant on 18 July 2016. Meanwhile, Turkish parliament was evacuated due to unidentified security concerns.

=== Elections and HDP harassment ===
In the 2014 Turkish local elections, the sister party of the HDP, the Peace and Democracy Party (BDP) won 97 district municipalities out of 1351 and 2 metropolitan municipalities out of 30. Starting in September 2016, the purges pushed upon the largely Kurdish political formations HDP and BDP. About a third of the HDP members, more than 11,000 people were detained, more than 3000 of them were formally arrested, while also 94 democratically elected mayors have been expelled from their posts. 2014's elected mayors were removed, detained, and subjected to politically motivated prosecutions. Elected mayors were replaced by government's appointees. Municipal councils were not formally dissolved, but were not gathered anymore to hold their democratic and managerial functions.

In October 2018, President Erdogan vowed to seize all municipalities the HDP could win in the 2019 Turkish local elections. By March 2020, out of the 65 municipalities won by social-democrate HDP during the 2019 Turkish local elections, 46 municipalities (69%) had been seized by Turkish government. The dismissal and municipal seizures are believed to be purely politically motivated, using ill-defined accusation of terrorism. Local human right activist comment that "terrorism in Turkey [is] so vague, broad, and ambiguous that anybody critical of the government can easily be criminalized as a terrorist" while dismissals, arrests, prosecutions, and condemnations are based on "trumped-up terrorism charges". Since 2014, over 90 municipalities have been seized. Dismissed mayors, part of the HDP movement who repeatedly stated opposition to PKK-TSK violences, were later arrested on charges of "membership to a terror organization." These removals have been described as a violation of people's democratic vote.

The at the time HDP co-heads Selahattin Demirtaş and Figen Yüksekdağ were jailed and the prosecution was seeking up to 142 years for Demirtaş and 83 years for Yüksekdaĝ imprisonment. The main charge is the allegation of "managing a terrorist organization [(the HDP)]". As of May 2020, both politicians remain arrested.

=== Civil service ===
Following a series of arrests and purges throughout the government, Prime Minister Yıldırım announced on 18 July 2016 that annual leave for all civil servants was suspended, and all those on leave were to return to work. Over three million civil servants were affected. In addition, public sector employees were banned from leaving the country.

By the evening of 19 July 2016, the number of public sector employees suspended had reached 49,321. In the Ministry of Finance, more than 1500 employees were suspended. In the Prime Ministry, 257 employees, including six advisers, were suspended. The Presidency of Religious Affairs suspended 492 employees, among them three provincial muftis. The numbers of suspended personnel in the National Intelligence Organization and Ministry of Family and Social Policy were 100 and 393 respectively.

On 20 July 2016, the Youth and Sports Minister Akif Çağatay Kılıç announced that 245 personnel within his ministry had been laid off. The Energy Ministry reports 300 employees were let go, and the Customs Ministry indicated 184 employees were dismissed.

=== Education ===
==== Immediate purge ====
By far the greatest purge was in the Ministry of National Education, where 15,200 education ministry officials were suspended. The licenses of 21,000 teachers in the private sector were also cancelled. The Council of Higher Education asked all deans of state and private universities, numbering 1577, to resign. 626 educational institutions, mostly private, were shut down. For example, in Burdur, one school, one cram school and four student hostels were shut down on 20 July. In addition, a travel ban was placed on academics, preventing them from leaving the country.

On 23 July 2016, Turkish authorities shut down 1,043 private schools, 1,229 charities and foundations, 19 trade unions, 15 universities and 35 medical institutions in his first emergency decree under the newly adopted emergency legislation.

==== Forced cultural changes ====
Academics have reported pre-2016 coup's changes in academic leadership, and sharp growing pressure after the 2013 Gezi Park protests and 2016 coup. Dean and academic management have pressured professors and students to align with conservative values and teachings. Activities, associations and student clubs have been closed under similar pressure. Conservative students are empowered to denounce non-conservative activities. Academic grants and tenures are reported to be filtered according to political affiliations and connections. Teachers have reported a forced change in political, academic, and critical culture, with firing and exclusion of traditional academic profiles, with worries about the long-term effect of such change and academic purge on the expertise and tone of both Turkey's researches and governmental statutes, culture and policies. While private university are technically allowed to hire purged academics, many reports private university been scared to hire them, increasing the economic exclusion. Academics have been subjects to travel bans.

==== Petitioners ====
About one thousand scholars and human right experts who had earlier petitioned for the end of military operations in South East Turkey, Afrin and Syria have faced systematic punitive consequences via public agencies, including interrogations, judicial prosecutions, firing from jobs, arrests, trials and condemnations for "terrorist propaganda". The signatories have been subject to 2000 routine judicial hearings with usual 15 months suspended jail sentence, with no acquittal reported and about 30 actual imprisonments.

=== Media ===
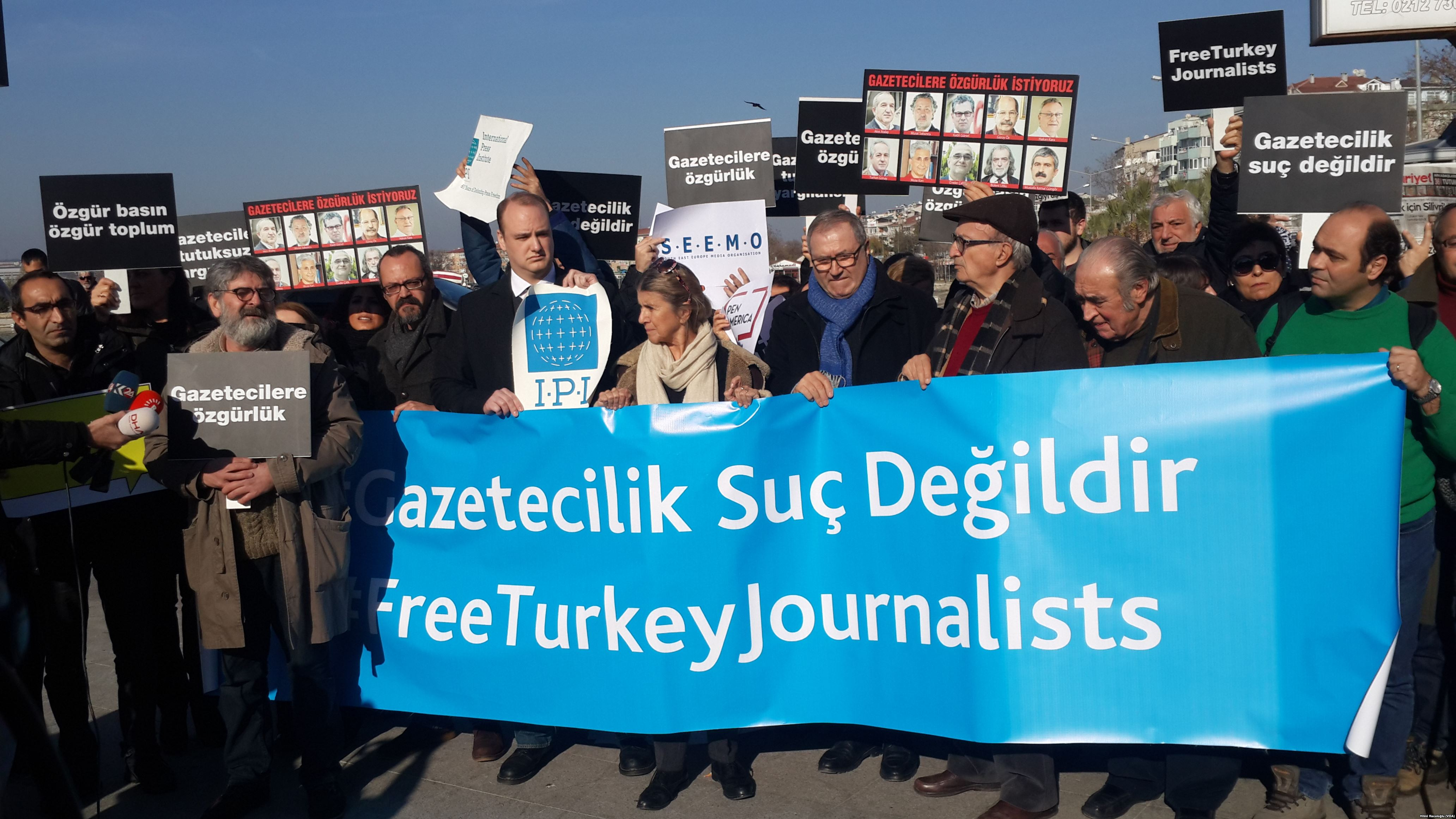
Turkish journalists protesting imprisonment of their colleagues on Human Rights Day, 10 December 2016

The licenses of 24 radio and television channels and the press cards of 34 journalists reported of being linked to Gülen were revoked. Two people were arrested for praising the coup attempt and insulting the Turkish President Erdoğan on social media. On 25 July, Nazlı Ilıcak was taken into custody.

On 27 July 2016, Erdoğan shut down 16 television channels, 23 radio stations, 45 daily newspapers, 15 magazines and 29 publishing houses in another emergency decree under the newly adopted emergency legislation. The closed outlets include Gülen-affiliated Cihan News Agency, Samanyolu TV and the previously leading newspaper Zaman (including its English-language version Today's Zaman), but also the opposition daily newspaper Taraf which was known to be in close relations with the Gulen Movement.

In late October 2015, Turkish authorities shut down 15 media outlets, including one of the world's only women's news agencies, and detained the editor-in-chief of the prominent secularist Turkish newspaper Cumhuriyet, "on accusations that they committed crimes on behalf of Kurdish militants and a network linked to the US-based cleric Fethullah Gülen".

Turkey has imprisoned more than 160 journalists, making it the world's biggest jailer of journalists. In May 2018, at a press conference with British PM Theresa May, Turkish President Erdoğan called Turkey's jailed journalists "terrorists".

=== Traveling ===
Government authorities had revoked almost 11,000 passports by 22 July; by 30 July, more than 50,000 passports were cancelled.

== Extradition ==
In August 2016 Turkish President Erdoğan gave the United States an ultimatum, demanding the extradition of Fethullah Gülen, the cleric said to be behind the failed 15 July coup attempt. Turkey demanded that Greece extradite eight Turkish soldiers who had fled there after the coup. On 11 August 2016, Bulgaria extradited Abdullah Büyük, a Turkish businessman being linked with the Gülen movement.

== Purges by numbers ==
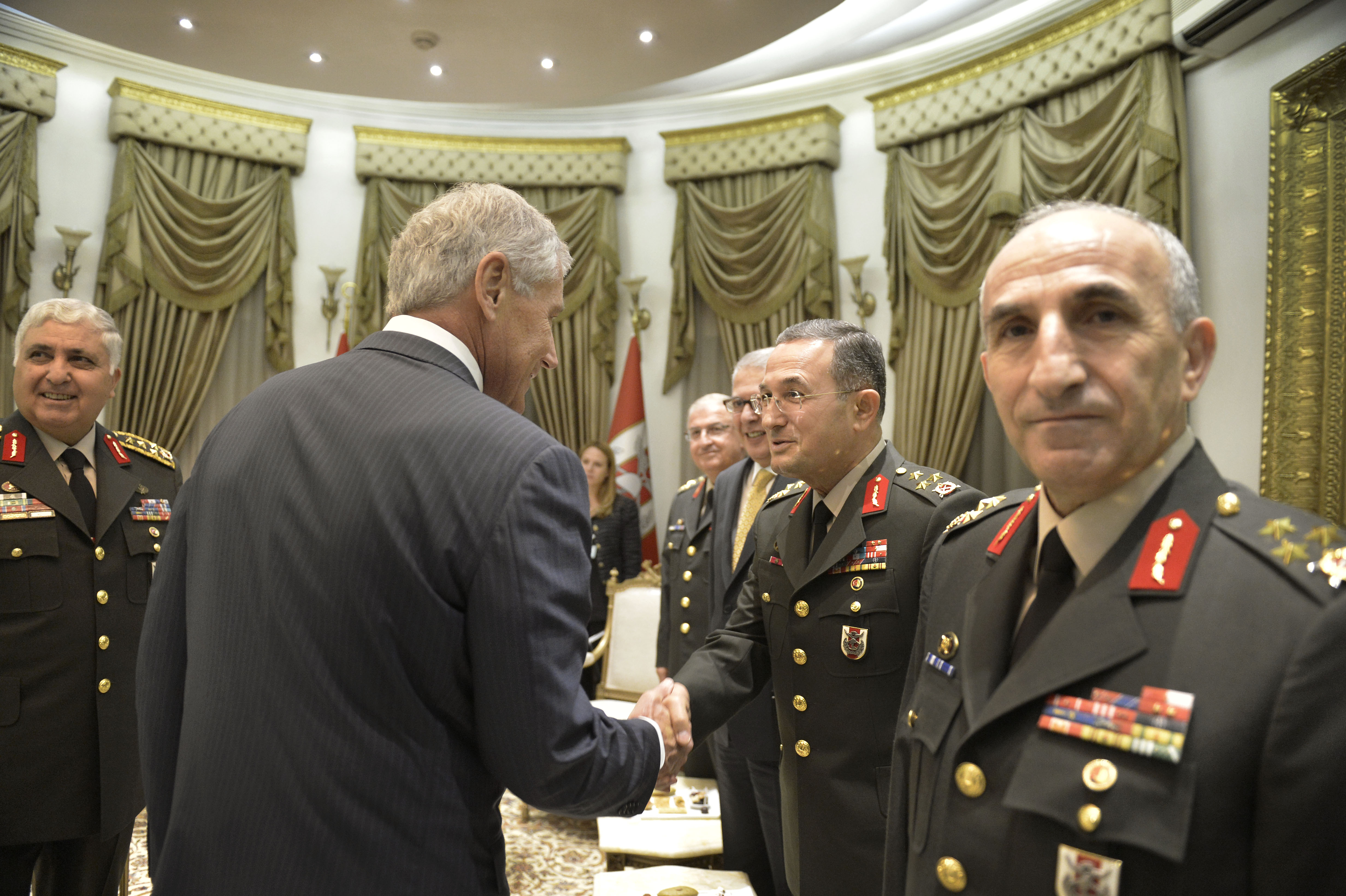
U.S. Secretary of Defense Chuck Hagel shakes hands in 2014 with General Erdal Öztürk, later arrested in connection with the failed coup.

=== Initial purges ===
The bulk of the purges happened in the ten days following the coup. The government releasing data documenting the issue:

Ministry / Institution	Suspended	Arrested	Notes	Reference/Date
Turkish Armed Forces	1,684	96		2016-07-27; 2016-07-20
Turkish Land Forces	1,069	N/A	87 generals	2016-07-27; 2016-07-20
Turkish Naval Forces	154	N/A	32 admirals	2016-07-27; 2016-07-20
Turkish Air Force	461	N/A	30 generals	2016-07-27; 2016-07-20
Ministry of the Interior	8,777	N/A		2016-07-18
Ministry of Health	5,581	N/A	115 managers, 1504 doctors	2016-07-28
Ministry of Culture and Tourism	110	N/A		2016-07-26
Ministry of National Education	15,200	N/A		2016-07-19
MNE licensed Education institutions	21,000	N/A		
Ministry of Development	82	N/A		2016-07-25
Ministry of Economy	15	N/A		2016-07-25
Ministry of Forest and Water Management	197	N/A		2016-07-25
Ministry of Transport, Maritime Affairs and Communications	529	N/A		2016-07-25
Ministry of Science, Industry and Technology	560	N/A		2016-07-25
Ministry of Family and Social Policy	599	N/A		2016-07-25
Ministry of Environment and Urban Planning	70	N/A		2016-07-25
Turkish Universities	5,342	N/A		2016-08-12
İstanbul Metropolitan Municipality	768	N/A		2016-07-29
Supreme Board of Judges and Prosecutors	648	N/A		2016-08-10
Totals	81,494	20,355		2016-08-13 2016-08-17

=== Later purges, mass suspensions and mass arrests ===
==== 2016 ====
On 26 July 2016, European Commission President Jean-Claude Juncker announced that Turkey's EU membership process would come to an end if the death penalty was returned in Turkey. On 4 and 5 August 2016, the Istanbul and İzmir 1st Criminal Court of Peace issued an arrest warrant for U.S.-based cleric Fethullah Gülen. On 17 August 2016, the government dismissed 2,300 more officers from the police force, 136 military officers and 196 employees from the information technology authority.

On 18 August 2016, arrest warrants were issued for 187 suspects, including CEOs of leading companies in Turkey, with prosecutors also ordering the seizure of their assets.

On 2 September 2016, Turkey announced a purge of about 11,500 teachers with stated links to PKK. The move was denounced by Kurdish and Turkish opposition parties for lacking due process and evidences. An anonymous former Turkish diplomat said the move sharply weakened the pacifist wing of Kurdish voices, pushing the Kurdish movement toward more radical means.

On 11 September 2016, Turkey removed two dozen elected mayors, members of the opposition Peoples' Democratic Party (HDP), for stated links to Kurdish militants.

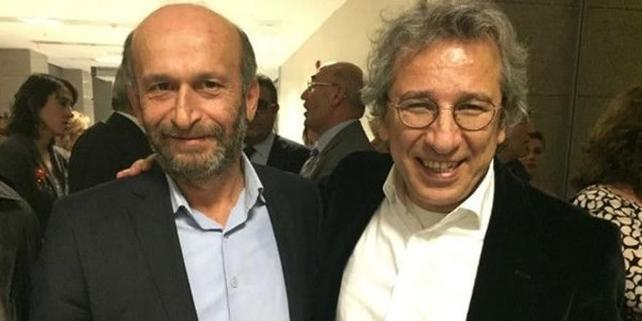
Turkish journalists Can Dündar and Erdem Gül were arrested facing sentences up to life imprisonment.

On 4 October 2016, Turkish authorities suspend nearly 12,800 more police officers from duty over their suspected links with U.S.-based cleric Fethullah Gulen.

On 29 October 2016, by decree, Turkey dismissed 10,131 more civil servants, while about 15 more media outlets were closed for stated ties to terrorist organizations and U.S.-based cleric Fethullah Gülen.

In early November 2016, security forces began mass arrests of opposition Peoples' Democratic Party (HDP) MPs, including co-leaders Selahattin Demirtaş and Figen Yüksekdağ. Internet and social web services were blocked across southeastern Turkey. Out of 59 HDP's MPs, 15 were researched, 12 MPs were detained, 2 MPs were travelling abroad, and one not located.

On 22 November 2016, a decree announced 15,726 dismissals (security forces: 7,600, ministry of interior: 2,700, education: 1,200). People were affected for being "related, belonging to or in contact with terror organizations and structures that are considered by the National Security Council as acting against national security." Passports of these affected people were canceled.
With this decree 550 associations, 9 medias, and 19 private medical structures have been closed. The financial assets and properties of those organizations were to be seized by the Turkish Treasury. On 24 November 2016, the European Parliament unanimously accepted the call for a temporary freeze of the full membership negotiations between the EU and Turkey. On 12 December 2016, in reaction to prior Istanbul double bombing and Kurdistan Freedom Falcons (TAK) states, 118 HDP officials and supporters were arrested.

On 21 December 2016, Turkey suspended another 1,980 teachers and school employees for stated connections to the coup attempt.

On 25 December 2016, Turkey probes around 10,000 social media users for reportedly insulting government officials or supporting "terror-related activity."

==== 2017 ====
On 7 January 2017, and via three decrees, 8,390 more civil servants were dismissed (2,687 police officers, 1,699 civil servants from the justice ministry, 838 health officials, and hundreds others from other ministries, 631 academics, 8 members of the Council of State).

In early February 2017, the Turkish government dismissed more than 4,400 public servants from their jobs, including over 300 university teachers.

On 14 February 2017, the Turkish government arrested 834 people with stated links with PKK. The mass arrest has been linked to the constitutional referendum, to which most Kurdish factions are opposed.

After the April 16 referendum, 38 activists denouncing irregularities were detained.

On 26 April 2017, 1009 police officers were reported of being a secret Gulenist network within the Turkish police force, and were detained. 9,100 policemen have been suspended

On 29 April 2017, Turkey blocked Wikipedia and dismissed 3,974 more civil servants. The NYT qualified the move as "an expand[ing] crackdown on dissent and free expression".

On 5 June, the Turkish interior ministry announces that 130 people, living outside the country and suspected of militant links, will lose their citizenship unless they return to Turkey within three months and meet government standards. Named suspects include U.S.-based cleric Fethullah Gülen, and Peoples' Democratic Party leaders Faysal Sarıyıldız, Tuğba Hezer Öztürk, and Özdal Üçer.

15 June 2017, UN Mechanism for International Criminal Tribunals judge Aydin Sedaf Akay was sentenced to 7½ years on charges of "membership in [to the Gulen movement, itself] a terrorist organization", despite Mr. Akay having diplomatic immunity due to his position at the UN MICT. On 6 July 2017, the European Parliament unanimously accepted the call for the suspension of full membership negotiations between the EU and Turkey. On 15 July, 7,400 more police were dismissed.

On 24 December 2017, a decree announce the dismissal of 2,700 public officers.

==== 2018 ====
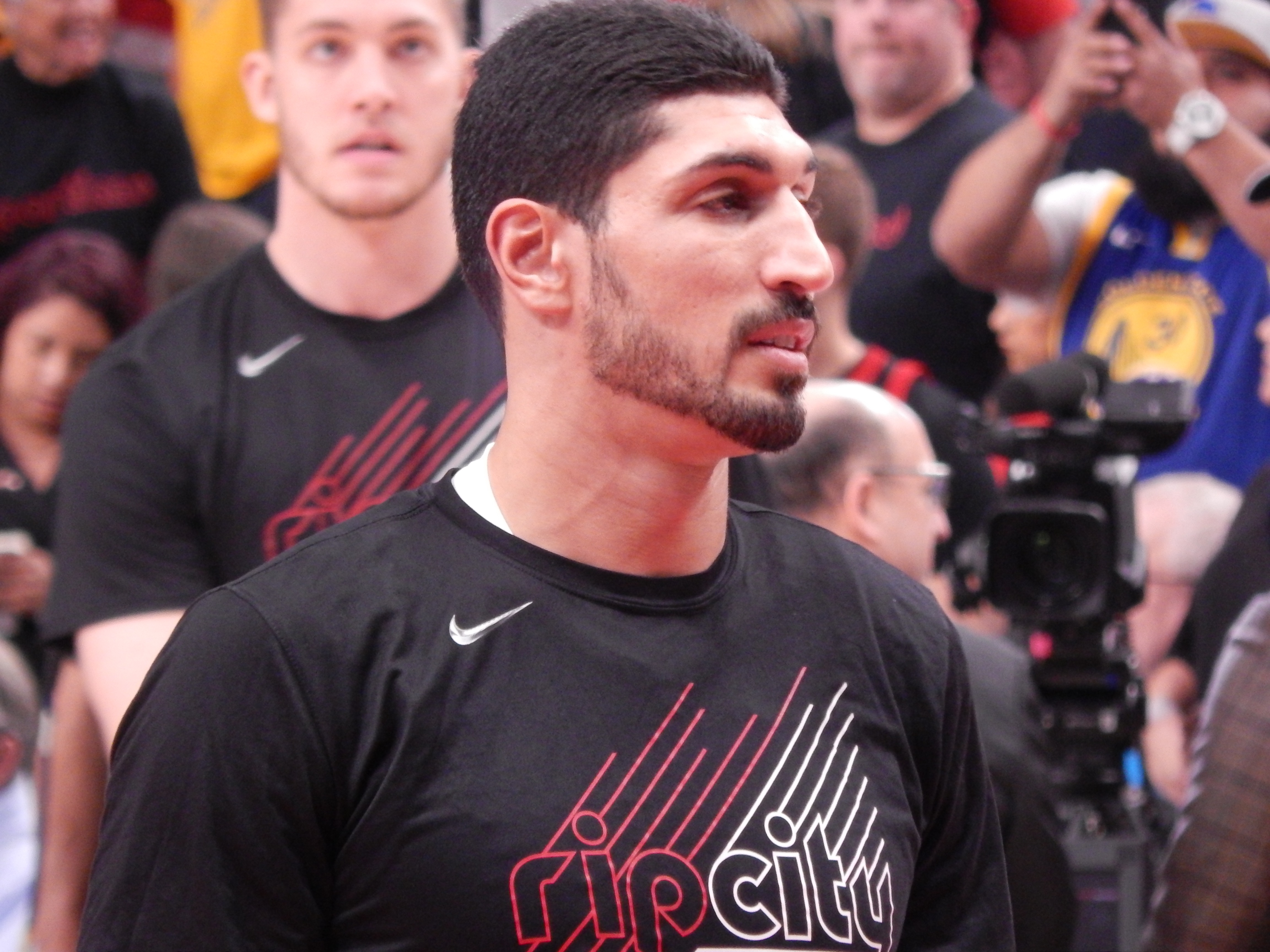
The purges have gotten attention in the United States due to the Turkish government's attempts to arrest and extradite NBA player Enes Kanter, who is both a Gulenist and an outspoken critic of Erdoğan. Kanter did not attend team and league functions held abroad as he feared for his safety if he ever left the United States.

Turkey detained over 800 social media users and nearly 100 politicians and journalists who opposed the Turkish invasion of the Kurdish-controlled enclave of Afrin.

In February 2018, the Ministry of National Education revoked the suspension order for Gökhan Açıkkollu, a history teacher who had died in police custody on 5 August 2016 following claims of physical trauma and denial of medical care. Media outlets and human rights observers interpreted the decision as a posthumous exoneration, while senior government officials described it as a mandatory administrative step due to his death. In November 2022, the United Nations Human Rights Committee ruled in Decision no. 3730/2020 that Turkey had violated Articles 6 (right to life) and 7 (prohibition of torture) of the International Covenant on Civil and Political Rights regarding his death in custody.

On 26 April 2018, Esma Uludağ, a former Turkish civil servant dismissed via an emergency decree, died of a stroke and cardiac arrest in Athens, Greece, three months after escaping across the Evros River with her three young children. Her death drew international attention to the humanitarian situation of purge victims fleeing legal prosecution in Turkey.

On 8 July 2018, right before Erdogan new presidency with enlarged executive powers and the promised end of the state of emergency, 18,632 public officiers were dismissed by decree. Among them, 9,000-plus are police officers, 6,000-plus are members of the Turkish military, and over 1,000 are from judiciary, about 650 are teachers and about 200 academics. Three newspapers, one TV channel and 12 associations were also shut down.

On 25 July 2018, Turkey passed new anti-terrorism bill to replace emergency rule. According to the Human Rights Watch, the new law "will allow authorities under the presidency, for the next three years, to dismiss judges and all other public officials arbitrarily. It also would allow the authorities to restrict movement within Turkey, ban public assemblies, and allow police to hold some suspects for up to 12 days without charge and repeatedly detain them in the same investigation." CHP parliamentary group leader Özgür Özel said that "With this bill, with the measures in this text, the state of emergency will not be extended for three months but for three years. They make it look like they are lifting the emergency, but in fact they are continuing it."

On 14 August 2018, Turkish police arrested another German citizen on terrorism-related charges. German authorities said nine German nationals are currently in detention in Turkey for "political reasons."

==== 2019 ====
On 12 February, Turkey issued 1,112 more detention orders, under the charge of organizing the 2016 Turkey coup.

According to Turkish government data from March 2019, about 500,000 people were detained since the coup attempt, of which about 30,000 were in custody at the time of the information. Erdogan reported in April 2019 of 31,000 employees of the police, as well as 15,000 members of the military, who had been removed from office since the coup d'état. According to Anadolu, in the first week of July 2019, 282 people were arrested throughout Turkey. The week before, at the end of June, there were 200 arrests. On 13 March 2019, the European Parliament unanimously accepted the call for a halt to the full membership negotiations between the EU and Turkey. On 28 July 2019, another German citizen, Osman B, was arrested on charges of running a "terror propaganda" using his Facebook account. He was arrested at a Turkish airport, while he was traveling for a family holiday. On 19 August 2019, the Turkish Ministry of Interior appointed trustees to the Diyarbakır, Mardin and Van metropolitan municipalities. In October 2019, Turkish police detained more than 120 online critics of the Turkish invasion of the Kurdish areas in Syria. Turkish prosecutor opened an investigation into "terrorist propaganda" against MPs Sezai Temelli and Pervin Buldan, co-leaders of the pro-Kurdish HDP party. Turkey arrested at least 151 members of the HDP, including district officials. Turkish authorities have also detained web editor of opposition BirGün newspaper and managing editor of the online news portal Diken.

==== 2020 ====
Due to the COVID-19 pandemic in Turkey, the Turkish parliament approved a bill which could enable the release of up to 100,000 prisoners, including people responsible for deaths. Political prisoners, journalists, are excluded from the pardon despite overcrowding and unsanitary living conditions already posing a severe health threat.

The Turkish Interior Ministry has arrested social media users whose posts were "targeting officials and spreading panic and fear" by suggesting that COVID-19 "had spread widely in Turkey and that officials had taken insufficient measures". Several journalists, who were each reporting for local media, were detained for how they covered the pandemic. On 15 May 2020, the Turkish Ministry of Interior appointed trustees for the municipalities of Iğdır and Siirt, the Baykan and Kurtalan districts of Siirt, and the municipalities of Altınova town of Korkut district of Muş. Authorities had arrested or imprisoned more than 90,000 Turkish citizens by 2020.

==== 2021 ====
In February, following a failed operation in which 13 Turkish soldiers died, Turkey arrested 700 opposition members, maneuvering to shift blame onto the opposition and Americans.

==== 2022 ====
In 2022, Turkey demands the extradition of many members of the Gülen movement and PKK from Finland and Sweden, of which Sweden wants to become a NATO member. However, the two countries rejected Turkey's extradition requests. On 18 May 2022, Turkey quickly blocked Finland and Sweden's applications for accelerated membership in NATO. In June 2022, the access of Deutsche Welle and Voice of America was completely blocked in Turkey. On 30 June 2022, Turkey announced that it would not approve NATO membership if members of the Gülen movement and PKK are not extradited from Finland and Sweden.

==== 2023 ====
On 29 January 2023, Turkey announced that it requested the extradition of 130 people suspected of being members of the Gülen movement and PKK in order for Finland and Sweden to approve them for NATO membership. On 13 September 2023, the European Parliament unanimously accepted the call not to restart full membership negotiations between the EU and Turkey.

==== 2024 ====
On 2 August 2024, access to the social media platform Instagram was completely blocked in Turkey. On 9 October 2024, access to the social media platform Discord in Turkey was completely blocked. On 4 November 2024, the Turkish Ministry of Interior appointed trustees to the Mardin metropolitan, Batman and Şanlıurfa's Halfeti municipalities.

== Human rights ==
Human rights in Turkey are governed by international law treaties, including the International Covenant on Civil and Political Rights that Turkey signed in 2000, that take precedence over Turkish legislation according to Article 90 of the 1982 Constitution. After protesters chanted for reintroduction of the death penalty, abolished by Turkey in 2004, Erdoğan stated that this was a possibility that would be discussed in parliament, and that in a democracy, the will of the people must be respected. On 21 July, the Turkish government announced that it would suspend the European Convention on Human Rights during a temporary state of emergency.

On 24 July 2016, Amnesty International called for the European Committee for the Prevention of Torture to make an emergency visit to Turkey to see the conditions in which the detainees were held.

=== Identification methods ===
Johannes Hahn, the European Commissioner dealing with Turkey's bid to become a member state of the European Union (EU), said that it appears Turkey's government had prepared arrest lists of political opponents before the coup attempt and had been waiting for the right time to act. The usage of social medias monitoring is suspected.

Anonymous-and-paid denunciations by secret witnesses are officially declared as the main source for identifying suspects. Most of the over 140 thousands people affected by the purges were affected following denunciations by coworkers and other citizens. The system have been legalized via a 31 August 2015's decree by the Ministry of interior. The rewarded anonymous denunciation's grid is public and online, divided in 5 category according to the threat, and pointing to major suspects, mainly Kurds, then Gulenist, then Islamists (ISIS).

About 11 millions citizens or one in 6 adults are reported to be under investigation online.

==== Fetometer ====
Reports of a scoring system for Turkey citizens and foreigners to assess their relationships to the Gulen networks and crack down on them emerged. The system, already in use on Turkey civil public servants and some military branch, allows Turkey governments to assess the relationship of citizens to Gulenist networks and likelihood for them to be part of it. In the field of education, the Turkish National Education Ministry used a Fetometer software to assess the relation of 993 books used in teaching with a set of Gulenist phrases and concepts. 100 books were assessed "inconvenient", 12 were "certainly Gulenist" and now banned by the Ministry. The phrases and concepts looked for were dialogue, respect for human beings, the golden generation, horizon man, hope and dedication.

=== Detainees' conditions ===
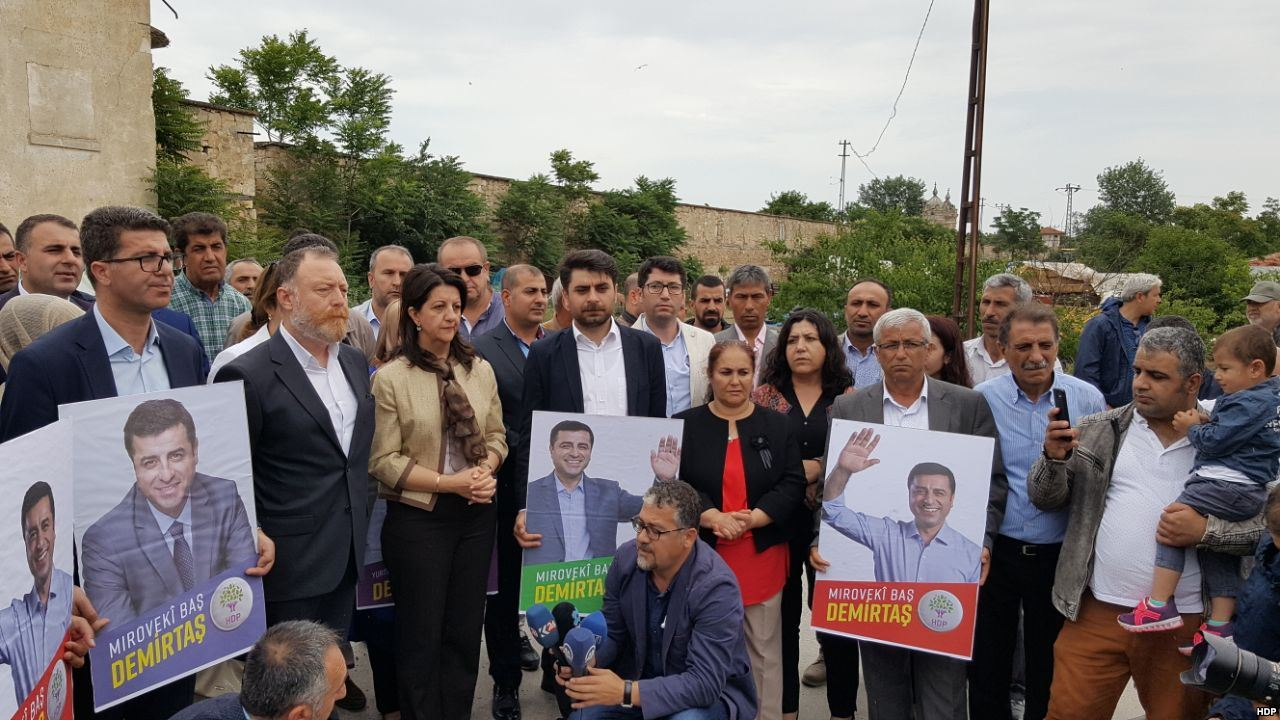
Selahattin Demirtaş's presidential campaign being launched outside Edirne prison where he is incarcerated, 25 May 2018

According to Amnesty International, during the July 2016 purges, detainees were denied food for up to three days and water for up to two days, were denied medical treatment, were reportedly raped with police truncheons or fingers, and were subjected to other forms of torture. Amnesty said that three hundred male soldiers held in the Ankara police headquarters were beaten during their detention, with injuries including bruises, cuts and broken bones. Forty soldiers were unable to walk because of their injuries, and two were unable to stand. Amnesty also said that detainees' shirts were covered in blood during their interrogations by prosecutors and that detainees during the purges were mostly prevented from contacting their families and lawyers.

Given overcrowded conditions, the Turkish government published a decree on 16 August announcing that 38,000 inmates whose criminal offense pre-dated 1 July were now eligible for sentence reduction. Inmates with two years or less to serve are eligible, while inmates who have served half of their sentence can ask for parole. The decree applies to crimes committed before 1 July 2016, excluding convictions for murder, domestic violence, sexual abuse, terrorism or crimes against the state.

=== Prosecution of lawyers ===
Between July 2016 and June 2019, out of more than 1500 prosecuted lawyers, 599 were arrested and 311 were sentenced to an average of about six years in prison. 34 lawyers associations in Turkey were shut down, and lawyers were forced to testify against their own clients. A law was enacted which forbade lawyers charged with terror related offenses to represent clients accused in terror-related offenses. Communications between lawyers and their respective clients arrested in pre-trial detention was enabled to be recorded.

=== Arrest of human rights activists ===
Turkish human rights lawyer Orhan Kemal Cengiz was detained for three days in July 2016. He was "provisionally released" and remains subject to a travel ban. Serdar Kuni, a doctor from Cizre, who assisted the respected Human Rights Foundation in documenting violations in the town, and arrested on poorly defined charges of "being a member of a terrorist organization" for treating injured locals.

On 6 June 2017, Taner Kılıç, the Chair of Amnesty International Turkey, and another 22 lawyers were detained in İzmir by the Turkish police on the suspicion of having links with the Fethullah Gülen movement and later charged with "membership of a terrorist organisation". The detention and prosecution was condemned by Amnesty International and Human Rights Watch who asked for his immediate release. Hugh Williamson, Europe and Central Asia director at Human Rights Watch, stated that "detaining Kılıç on suspicion of terrorist offenses looks like a tactic aimed at discrediting his legitimate human rights work."

=== Nightwatchmen system ===
The bekçi or Nightwatchmen auxiliary police force has been used in the 1990s to monitor the South Eastern regions against PKK activities.

Bekçi forces have traditionally served as neighborhood watchmen in Turkey.

In 2008, the 8,000 active bekçis were absorbed into regular police force and the system abolished.

Following the 2016 Coup and a large-scale operation in southeastern regions, the Turkish government reinstated the bekçi force, hiring 2,400 officers to patrol the regions' Kurdish-majority cities of Sirnak, Hakkari, Urfa, Mardin and Diyarbakir. The bekçi guards have since been gradually extended to the entire country.

Nightwatchmen's are described as local young men, with Standart watchmen training.

Bekçi guards can be equipped with whistles, batons, and carry guns (Jan. 2020).

They have the authority to check citizens' identity, body search them, and use of lethal force is under legislative discussion.

== International ==
The Turkish government have been looking for opponents in foreign countries as well.

=== School closures ===
About 1,000 Gülen movement schools exist worldwide, with 300 of them in Turkey. Turkey requested closure of affiliated schools in 50 countries.

- Somalia closed the Gülen affiliated schools.
- Azerbaijan closed 13 education centres, 11 high schools, and also Qafqaz University associated with Gülen movement.
- Pakistan: Turkey requested closure of Gülen movement schools.
- Sudan closed Gülen movement schools by Turkish request.

=== Foreign operations and abductions ===
Turkey has led a hunt of political opponents abroad. Private planes are used to illegally abduct gulenists on foreign territories, without agreements with local jurisdictions.

== Reactions ==
The purges were criticized by Western governments and human rights groups. Human Rights Watch warned the Turkish government against "[using] the coup attempt to justify a witch-hunt against those it regards as opponents". Andrew Gardner, Amnesty International's researcher for Turkey, said: "We are witnessing a crackdown of exceptional proportions in Turkey at the moment. While it is understandable, and legitimate, that the government wishes to investigate and punish those responsible for this bloody coup attempt, they must abide by the rule of law and respect freedom of expression."

Conversely, the purges were praised by Judicial Commission of Indonesia chairman Aidul Fitriciada Azhari. Azhari pointed to the purges as a positive example of external oversight of a judicial system and the exercise of executive power by a judicial commission, referring to the Supreme Board of Judges and Prosecutors.

=== Accession of Turkey to the European Union ===
Johannes Hahn, the European Commissioner dealing with Turkey's bid to become a member state of the European Union (EU), said that it appeared Turkey's government had prepared arrest lists of political opponents before the coup attempt and had been waiting for the right time to act. EU High Representative of the Union for Foreign Affairs and Security Policy Federica Mogherini condemned the purges, saying: "What we're seeing especially in the fields of universities, media, the judiciary, is unacceptable."

Horst Seehofer, the minister-president of Bavaria, urged the EU to suspend Turkey's accession negotiations: "If one sees how Turkey is dismantling the rule of law... then these (EU membership) negotiations must be stopped immediately. No democratic constitutional state acts like this."

On 24 November 2016 the European Parliament voted 497 to 37 in favour of a non binding freeze on membership talks with Turkey in response to "disproportionate repressive measures taken in Turkey since the failed military coup attempt."

=== University associations ===
The Czech University Council compared negatively the purges of educational institutions in Turkey to events which took place under the Communist regime in former Czechoslovakia.

The European University Association (EUA) joined by the European University Foundations (EUF) "strongly and unconditionally" condemned the forced resignation of hundreds of deans from higher education institutions in Turkey in the wake of the failed coup attempt in the country, and called on all European governments, universities and scholars to speak out against these developments and to support democracy in Turkey, including institutional autonomy and academic freedom for scholars and students.

=== Europe ===
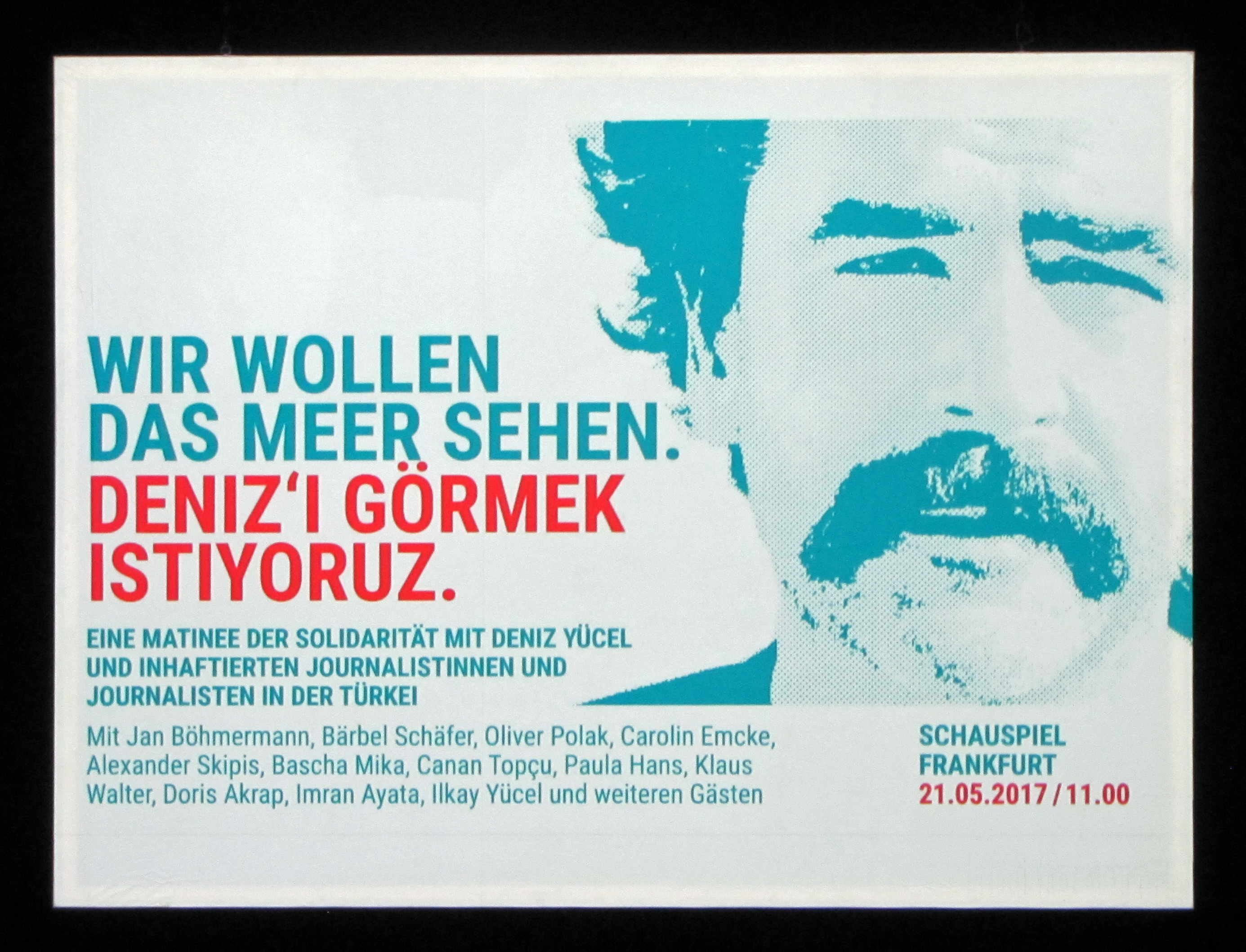
Free Deniz Yücel campaign in Frankfurt, 21 May 2017

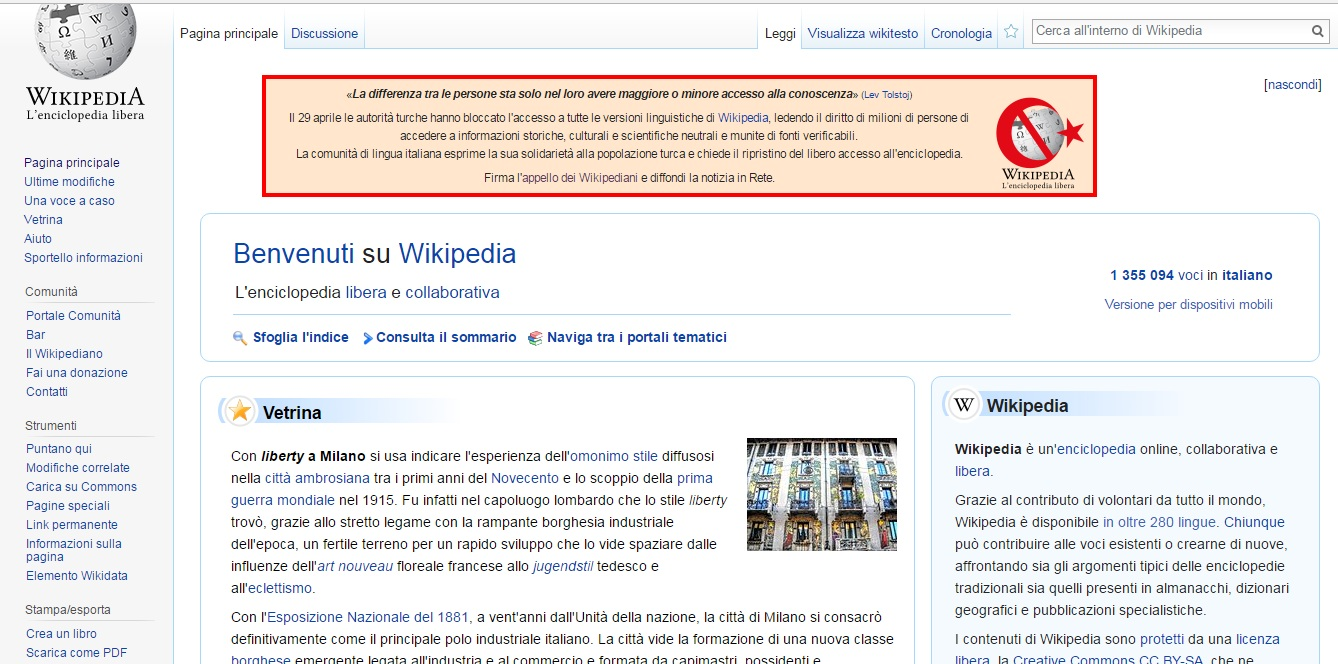
Italian Wikipedia against Turkey's censorship

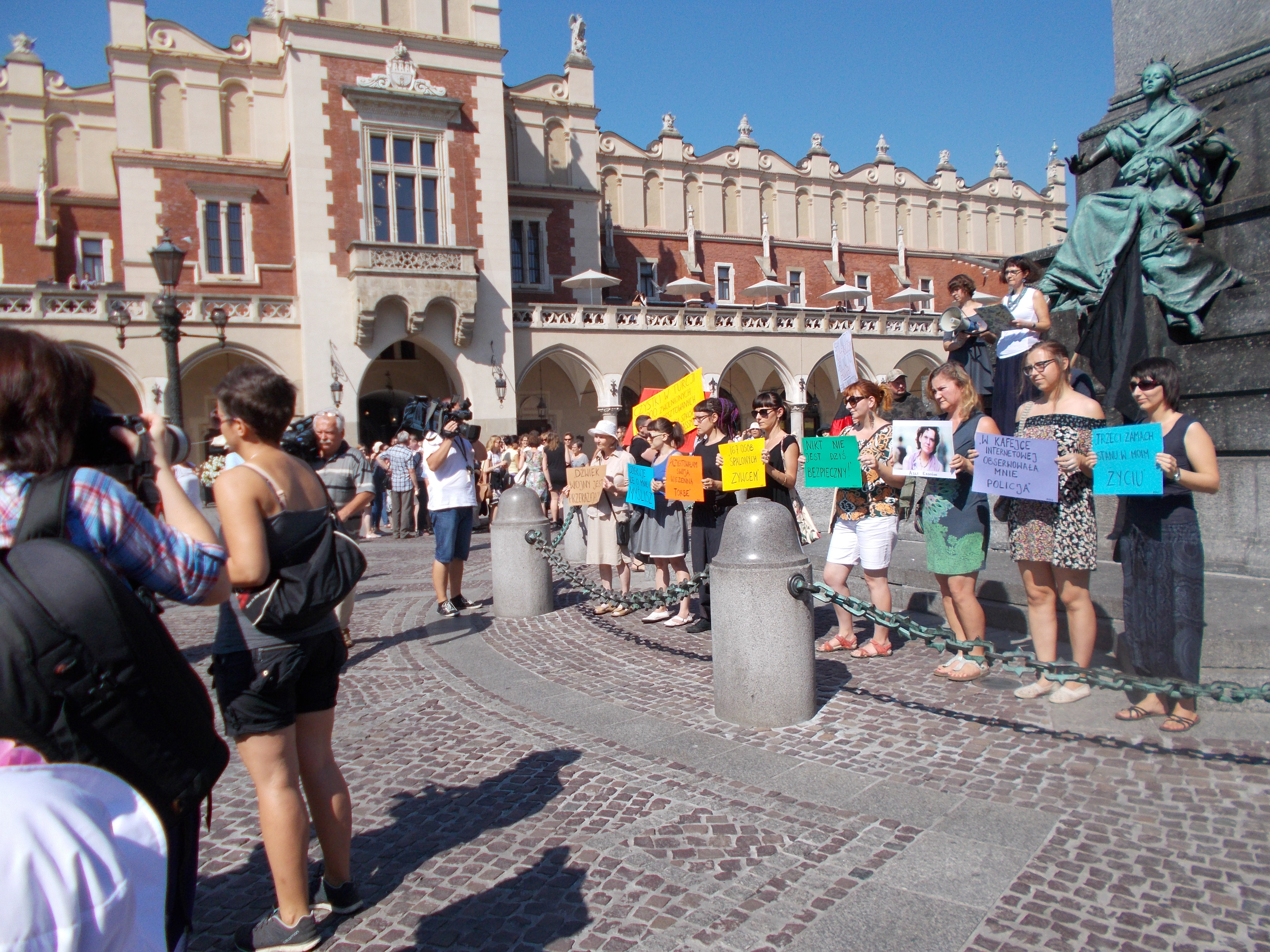
Demonstration in support of arrested journalist Aslı Erdoğan in Kraków, Poland

Belgian Foreign Minister Didier Reynders said Turkish authorities' reaction to the failed coup needed to be "proportionate," and that he was alarmed by the arrests of judges and calls for reinstatement of the death penalty against coup participants.

French Foreign Minister Jean-Marc Ayrault voiced concern, warning against a "political system which turns away from democracy" in response to the purges.

British Foreign Secretary Boris Johnson described the Gülen movement as a "cult" and expressed his support for the post-coup purges. Johnson said: "what happened in July [2016] was deeply violent, deeply anti-democratic, deeply sinister and it was totally right that it was crushed."

=== United States ===
U.S. President Barack Obama said he was concerned by pictures showing the rough treatment of some of the arrested coup plotters, some of whom appeared stripped to their underwear and handcuffed behind their backs. U.S. Secretary of State John Kerry urged Turkish authorities to halt the crackdown on its citizens, expressing concern that the aim of the crackdown was to "suppress dissent."

The commander of U.S. Central Command, General Joseph Votel, said that several of the U.S. military's closest partners in the Turkish military have been jailed. In response, Erdoğan said Votel was being on the side of coup plotters. On 29 July, Votel said in a statement: "Any reporting that I had anything to do with the recent unsuccessful coup attempt in Turkey is unfortunate and completely inaccurate. ... We appreciate Turkey's continuing cooperation and look forward to our future partnership in the counter-ISIL fight."

On 1 August 2018, President Donald Trump's administration sanctioned two top Turkish government officials, Turkish Justice Minister Abdulhamit Gül and Interior Minister Suleyman Soylu, over the detention of American pastor Andrew Brunson. The indictment stated that American pastor had ties with Gülen's network. Daniel Glaser, the former Assistant Secretary for Terrorist Financing under President Barack Obama, said: "It's certainly the first time I can think of" the U.S. sanctioning a NATO ally. "I certainly regard it as a human rights violation to unlawfully detain somebody, so I think it falls within the scope of the Global Magnitsky Act."

=== United Nations ===
In July 2016, the U.S., with the support of Britain, drafted language for the United Nations Security Council that would have expressed grave concern over the situation, called upon on all parties to "respect the democratically elected government of Turkey" and the rule of law, and urged the parties to show restraint and avoid violence. However, Egypt blocked the proposed statement. Egyptian diplomats said that the council is "in no position to qualify, or label [the Turkish] government—or any other government for that matter—as democratically elected or not". Objection by the United States and the UK—permanent members of the Security Council—led to Egypt proposing a new statement calling for all sides to "respect the democratic and constitutional principles and the rule of law", which was rejected, preventing the condemnation of the coup attempt by the Security Council.

In August 2016, United Nations High Commissioner for Human Rights Zeid Ra'ad Al Hussein decried the purge. Zeid said that while he opposed the coup attempt, the wide-ranging purge showed a "thirst for revenge" that was alarming. Later that month, a group of experts in the Office of the High Commissioner for Human Rights issued a joint statement saying that the purges may violate international law, specifically Turkey's obligations under the International Covenant on Civil and Political Rights. The statement said: "While we understand the sense of crisis in Turkey, we are concerned that the government's steps to limit a broad range of human rights guarantees go beyond what can be justified in light of the current situation. Turkey is going through a critical period. Derogation measures must not be used in a way that will push the country deeper into crisis."

In March 2018 Office of the United Nations High Commissioner for Human Rights issued a report on the impact of the state of emergency on human rights in Turkey. The report indicates interference of the executive with the work of the judiciary and curtailment of parliamentary oversight over the executive branch of government; arbitrary mass dismissals of civil servants and private sector employees; arbitrary closure of civil society organizations, including prominent human rights NGOs and media; arbitrary detention of people arrested under state of emergency measures; the use of torture and ill-treatment during pre-trial detention; restrictions of the rights to freedoms of expression and of movement; arbitrary expropriation of private property; and methods of collective punishment targeting family members of individuals suspected of offences under the state of emergency. OHCHR said that the routine extensions of the state of emergency may lead to an enduring system of governing characterized by a large number of arbitrary decisions that profoundly affect the lives of many individuals and families.

== Analysis ==
=== Historical light ===
Can Dündar, Editor-in-chief of the Turkish daily Cumhuriyet, described the purges as part of a historical pattern of political power in Turkey shifting back and forth between the secular military versus religious institutions, with democrats in the middle having little power to prevent the repeated oscillations, but worse than previous cycles. He described the 2016 purges as "the biggest witch-hunt in Turkey's history". Historians and analysts including Henri J. Barkey, Director of the Middle East Program of the Woodrow Wilson International Center for Scholars, compared the 2016 Turkish purges to Mao Zedong's Cultural Revolution that started in 1966 and the Iranian Cultural Revolution in which Iranian academia was purged during 1980–1987. The government of Turkey has been analysed to blame Western forces and raise anti-Americanism in order to distract the public from real intranational tensions, as well as to take an upper ground for negotiations. According to the New York Times, "Searching for historical parallels, analysts have made comparisons with Joseph McCarthy's anti-Communist witch hunt in 1950s America, the Stalinist purges of the 1930s and the Cultural Revolution in China in the 1960s and '70s." Other comparisons have been made with Hitler's use of the Reichstag fire to consolidate his power, and with Atatürk's use of the 1926 assassination plot on his life to purge Turkey of his political opponents and rivals.

=== Political sciences ===
Academics are now discussing "Turkey's democracy collapse" and its "authoritarian turn". It has been argued that solid political position encourage leaders to crack down and double down on oppositions parties while less secure governing groups are more inclined into deescalation and appeasement. AKP's political alliances with both wealthy business world via privileged and urban poor via redistribution of public resources, providing non-competitive elections, reduced elected officials political tolerance for oppositions and reduced the costs of cracking down on them. This AKP-hegemonic political landscape, associated calculations and observable room for repressive actions lead to increase authoritarianism from Turkish government through "securitization of dissent, mounting repression, and systematic violation of civil liberties". Turkey is described as a case of "competitive authoritarianism", a regime in which democratic elections occurs under the guidance of an authoritarian government and where the main party guaranteed to win.

== See also ==
- List of arrested journalists in Turkey
- List of arrested mayors in Turkey
- List of media outlets shut down in the 2016 Turkish purges
- Censorship in Turkey
- Freedom of speech in Turkey
- Human rights in Turkey
- Media freedom in Turkey
- Press freedom in Turkey
