= List of media outlets shut down in the 2016 Turkish purges =

This is a list of media outlets that were shut down in the course of the 2016 Turkish purges.

On 27 July 2016, President Recep Tayyip Erdoğan shut down 16 television channels, 23 radio stations, 45 daily newspapers, 15 magazines and 29 publishing houses in another emergency decree under the newly adopted emergency legislation. In October 2016 the Turkish government issued another decree which closed further news outlets. According to the European Federation of Journalists, 168 media outlets have been shut down during the state of emergency following the coup d'état attempt in July 2016.

== News agencies ==
The following four news agencies were shut down in July 2016:

1. Cihan News Agency. Web archives:
2. Muhabir News Agency. Web archives:
3. SEM News Agency
4. Urfa News Agency

Closed in October 2016:

1. Dicle News Agency (DİHA). Web archives:
2. Jin News Agency

== Newspapers ==
The following newspapers were shut down:

Closed in July 2016:
1. Adana Haber. Web archives:
2. Adana Medya. Web archives:
3. Akdeniz Türk. Web archives:
4. Şuhut’un Sesi. Web archives:
5. Kurtuluş. Web archives:
6. Lider. Web archives:
7. İscehisar
8. Durum
9. Türkeli. Web archives:
10. Antalya. Web archives:
11. Yerel Bakış
12. Nazar
13. Batman. Web archives:
14. Yerel Bakış
15. Batman Postası. Web archives:
16. Batman Doğuş. Web archives:
17. Bingöl Olay
18. İrade. Web archives:
19. İskenderun Olay
20. Ekonomi
21. Ege’de Son Söz. Web archives:
22. Demokrat Gebze
23. Kocaeli Manşet
24. Bizim Kocaeli. Web archives:
25. Haber Kütahya. Web archives:
26. Gediz
27. Zafer. Web archives:
28. Hisar. Web archives:
29. Turgutlu Havadis
30. Milas Feza. Web archives:
31. Türkiye’de Yeni Yıldız. Web archives:
32. Hakikat. Web archives:
33. Ajans 11
34. Yeni Emek
35. Banaz Postası
36. Son Nokta
37. Merkür Haber
38. Millet
39. Bugün. Web archives:
40. Meydan
41. Özgür Düşünce
42. Taraf. Web archives:
43. Yarına Bakış. Web archives:
44. Yeni Hayat
45. Zaman. Web archives:
46. Today's Zaman. Web archives:

Closed in October 2016:

1. Özgür Gündem
2. Azadiya Welat
3. Batman Çağdaş
4. Cizre Postası
5. Güney Express
6. İdil Haber
7. Kızıltepe’nin Sesi
8. Prestij Haber
9. Urfanatik
10. Yüksekova Haber

== Magazines ==
The following magazines were shut down:

Closed in July 2016
1. Akademik Araştırmalar
2. Aksiyon
3. Asya Pasifik
4. Bisiklet Çocuk
5. Diyalog Avrasya
6. Ekolife
7. Ekoloji
8. Fountain
9. Gonca
10. Gül Yaprağı
11. Nokta
12. Sızıntı
13. Turkish Left
14. Yağmur
15. Yeni Ümit
16. Zirve

Closed in October 2016:

1. Tiroji
2. Özgürlük Dünyası
3. Evrensel Kültür

== Publishers ==
The following publishers were shut down:

1. Altınburç
2. Burak Basın Yayın Dağıtım
3. Define
4. Dolunay Eğitim Yayın Dağıtım
5. Giresun Basın Yayın Dağıtım
6. Gonca
7. Gülyurdu
8. GYV
9. Işık Akademi
10. Işık Özel Eğitim
11. İklim Basın Yayın Pazarlama
12. Kaydırak
13. Kaynak
14. Kervan Basın Yayıncılık
15. Kuşak
16. Muştu
17. Nil
18. Rehber
19. Sürat Basım Yayın Reklamcılık Eğitim Araçları
20. Sütun
21. Şahdamar
22. Ufuk Basın Yayın Haber Ajans Pazarlama
23. Ufuk
24. Waşanxaneya Nil
25. Yay Basın Dağıtım
26. Yeni Akademi
27. Yitik Hazine
28. Zambak Basın Yayın Eğitim Turizm

== TV stations ==
The following sixteen television stations were shut down:

1. Barış TV
2. Bugün TV
3. Can Erzincan TV
4. Dünya TV
5. Hira TV
6. Irmak TV
7. Kanal 124
8. Kanaltürk
9. MC TV
10. Mehtap TV
11. Merkür TV
12. Samanyolu Haber
13. Samanyolu TV
14. SRT TV
15. Tuna Shopping TV
16. Yumurcak TV

== Radio stations ==
The following radio stations were shut down:

1. Aksaray Mavi
2. Aktüel
3. Berfin
4. Burç FM
5. Dünya Radyo
6. Esra
7. Haber Radyo Ege
8. Herkül
9. Jest
10. Kanaltürk Radyo
11. Radyo 59
12. Radyo Aile Rehberi
13. Radyo Bamteli
14. Radyo Cihan
15. Radyo Fıkıh
16. Radyo Küre
17. Radyo Mehtap
18. Radyo Nur
19. Radyo Şemşik
20. Samanyolu Haber Radyo
21. Umut
22. Yağmur
