= Gökhan Açıkkollu =

Turkish history teacher who died in police custody after the 15 July 2016

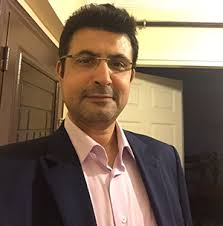
- Born: April 1, 1974; Kars, Turkey
- Died: August 5, 2016 (aged 42); Istanbul, Turkey
- Cause of death: Due to torture and denial of medical treatment while in custody
- Occupation: History teacher
- Known for: Symbolic victim of the purges following the 2016 Turkish coup attempt

Gökhan Açıkkollu (1 April 1974 – 5 August 2016) was a Turkish history teacher and educator who died in police custody due to torture and medical negligence following his arrest during the widespread purges in Turkey after the July 15, 2016 coup attempt. The death of Açıkkollu, the subsequent legal battles, and his posthumous reinstatement made him a powerful symbol of the widespread purges and operations targeting alleged members of the Gülen movement following the 2016 coup attempt.

== Life and career ==
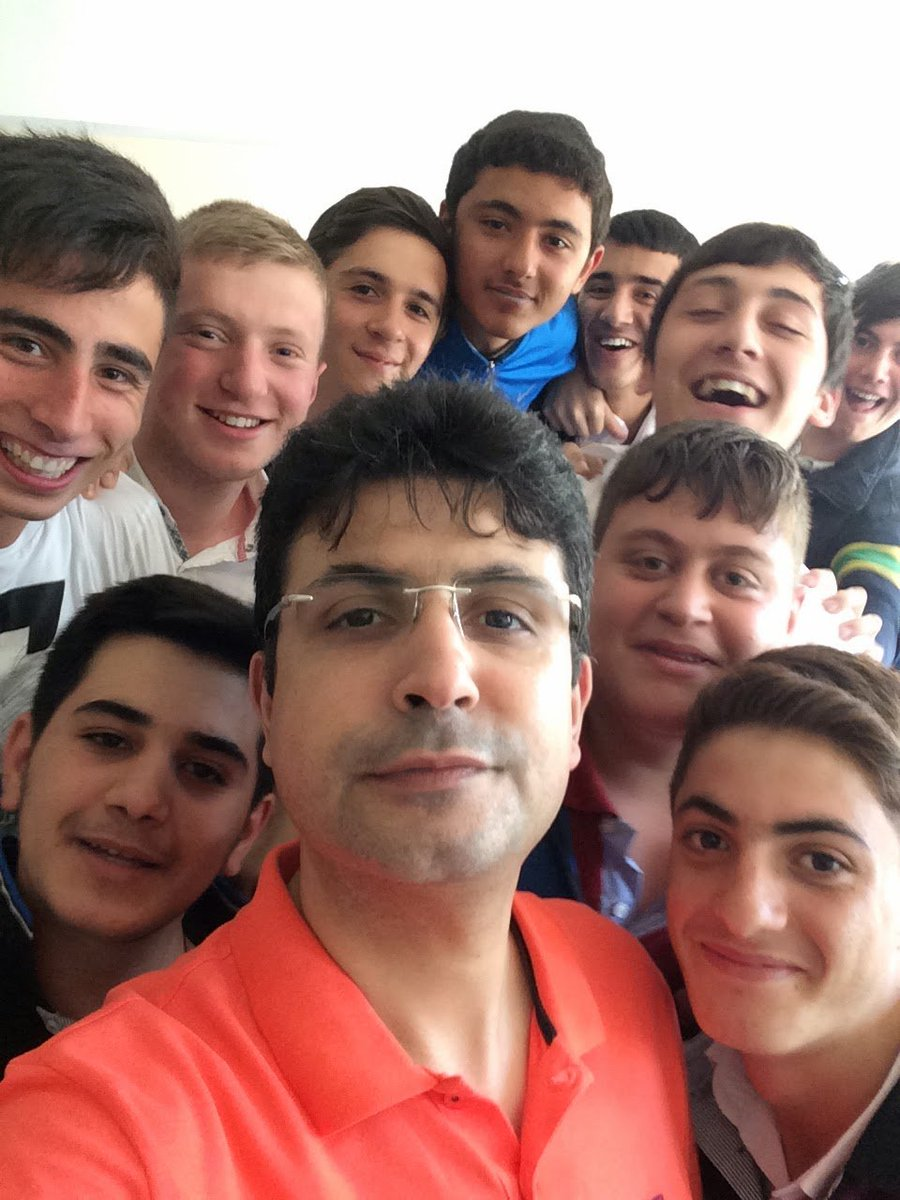
Gökhan Açıkkollu with his students at the classroom before the 15 July 2016 which is displayed at the Tenkil Memorial Center

Gökhan Açıkkollu was born in Kars, Turkey on 1 April 1974. He completed his primary, secondary, and high school education in Istanbul. In 1993, he was admitted to the History Department of the Faculty of Arts and Sciences at Selçuk University, graduating in 1997. He began his career working at the Nevşehir Serhat Tutoring Center. Between 2002 and 2003, he completed his 7-month short-term military service in Şemdinli, Hakkâri. Even during his military service, he continued teaching students at the Mehmetçik Tutoring Center.

He later worked in the provinces of Aksaray, Konya, and Istanbul. In 2012, he was appointed by the Ministry of National Education through the Public Personnel Selection Exam (KPSS). After working in Gaziantep for a year, he returned to Istanbul due to his wife's employment. His last position was as a history teacher at Ümraniye Atatürk Vocational and Technical Anatolian High School.

== Detention and death ==
Following the coup attempt on 15 July 2016, Açıkkollu was dismissed from his job by a statutory decree (KHK) and an investigation was launched against him for alleged membership in the Gülen movement.

On 23 July 2016, he was taken into custody by the Istanbul Police Department. His detention period was extended to 30 days under the nationwide State of emergency in Turkey. Açıkkollu suffered from chronic diabetes, and his family reported that he was denied access to his essential medication while in custody. The footage shows that Açıkkollu was held in a single-person cell with five people and was forced to share a single bed with three others. He was tortured for 13 days in the jail until his death. At the onset of his medical crisis, he is seen pleading for help from the police for several minutes, but no assistance came. After returning helplessly to his bed, he suffered a fatal attack and died.

On 5 August 2016, Açıkkollu fell ill in the C-3 detention room in the basement of the Istanbul Police Department headquarters on Vatan Street and died on his 14th day in custody. The official cause of death was recorded as a "heart attack". Human rights organizations and his family alleged medical neglect, ill-treatment, and torture. The Tenkil Memorial Center described his death as a "clear human rights violation" and a case of "state violence".

== Allegations of torture and investigation ==
Açıkkollu's family claimed he was subjected to torture and that his medical condition was ignored. An independent report by forensic medicine expert Prof. Dr. Şebnem Korur Fincancı indicated signs of torture, physical violence and denial of access to diabetes medication. These severe tortures concluded a heart attack. According to the Tenkil Museum, his broken glasses, exhibited in a museum, became a symbol of the violence he endured.

Several fellow detainees, including a lawyer and three forensic medicine specialists, filed petitions offering to testify about the torture they witnessed. Prosecutor Burhan Görgülü closed the case without hearing these witnesses, stating there was "no evidence of intent or negligence by anyone involved."

== The burial and public outcry ==
It was alleged that authorities intended to bury Açıkkollu in a so-called "traitors' cemetery." His family refused, and he was instead buried in Büyüköz, a village in the Ahırlı district of Konya, his wife's hometown. According to the Tenkil Memorial Center, some imams refused to perform his funeral prayer, so a relative of his wife conducted the burial.

Feray Aytekin Aydoğan, the president of the Education and Science Workers' Union (Turkey), reacted to the incident by stating: "Detention, allegations of torture, and even death are not enough for those who carry out extrajudicial killings; now there are requests to bury people in a 'graveyard of traitors,' followed by a letter of reinstatement. Through your unlawful statutory decrees, you have stolen the lives of our colleagues, their families, and their children. Who will be held accountable for this oppression?"

== Posthumous reinstatement ==
On 7 February 2018, approximately 1.5 years after Açıkkollu's death, the Ministry of National Education issued a formal decision (No. E.2561776) to revoke the suspension imposed on him. The decision, which cited a ministerial approval, lifted the disciplinary measure against Açıkkollu, who had been accused of alleged links to the Gulen movement. The official document was delivered to his wife, who had also been dismissed from her teaching position via a statutory decree (KHK).

The ministry's action was widely reported in the media and interpreted by the public as a "posthumous reinstatement" and a de facto acknowledgment of his innocence, given that he had died in police custody before any formal trial.

=== Government response and criticism ===
However, senior government officials explicitly rejected the characterization of the decision as an exoneration. Then-Undersecretary of the Ministry of Education, Yusuf Tekin, clarified that the revocation was a mandatory administrative procedure triggered by Açıkkollu's death, not an acquittal. Tekin stated that disciplinary measures under the state of emergency statutory decrees could not be applied to a deceased person and emphasized that “the individual has not been found innocent.” He further asserted that Açıkkollu's file contained "legal indications" of affiliation with the Gülen movement, but did not specify what these were or if they had ever been adjudicated in a court of law.

This explanation was met with significant criticism from opposition media and human rights commentators. An article in HakSöz Haber argued that Tekin's remarks effectively condemned Açıkkollu as guilty without a trial, violating the presumption of innocence. It also questioned the ethical and legal grounds for maintaining a presumption of guilt after an individual had died in state custody. The case became a focal point in discussions about the dismissals and the lack of due process during Turkey's state of emergency following the 2016 coup attempt.

Several human rights observers noted that the posthumous reinstatement of Gökhan Açıkkollu was widely interpreted as an implicit acknowledgement of wrongdoing in his detention. International coverage emphasized that the decision highlighted ongoing concerns about the treatment of detainees during the post-coup state of emergency, with rights groups describing the case as indicative of broader systemic problems.

== Legal process and UN ruling ==
Despite a criminal complaint by his family, the prosecutor's office decided not to prosecute. This decision was criticized by human rights organizations. The Human Rights Foundation of Turkey (TİHV) classified his death as a "result of torture and medical neglect."

Açıkkollu's wife, Tülay Açıkkollu, applied to the UN Human Rights Committee. In its decision (no. 3730/2020, dated 30 November 2022), the Committee found serious violations by Turkey:

- That safeguards against arbitrary detention could not be suspended under the state of emergency.
- That Turkey failed to conduct a prompt, impartial, and thorough investigation into his claims of physical and psychological trauma.
- That Turkey violated Articles 6 (right to life) and 7 (prohibition of torture) of the International Covenant on Civil and Political Rights by failing to protect him from torture and to safeguard his life despite his known health problems.
- That Turkey failed to justify why witness statements were ignored and why torture claims were not investigated effectively and in a timely manner.

== Constitutional Court ruling ==
On 30 July 2025, the Constitutional Court of Turkey ruled on the individual application filed by Açıkkollu's wife, Tülay Açıkkollu (full name: Mümüne Açıkkollu). The court found violations of the right to life and the prohibition of torture and ill-treatment, in both their substantive and procedural aspects.

== Testimony linking death to police official ==
In a hearing at the Istanbul 29th High Criminal Court concerning the coup night events at the Istanbul Gendarmerie Command, a defendant, N.K., testified that then-anti-terror police chief of the Vatan Police Center who is Kayhan Ay tortured him. N.K. stated that Ay told him: "Do you know the diabetic teacher? He died in my hands. I was the first to perform CPR. Your end will be the same if you don't speak." The teacher referenced was identified as Gökhan Açıkkollu.

== Legacy and memorial ==
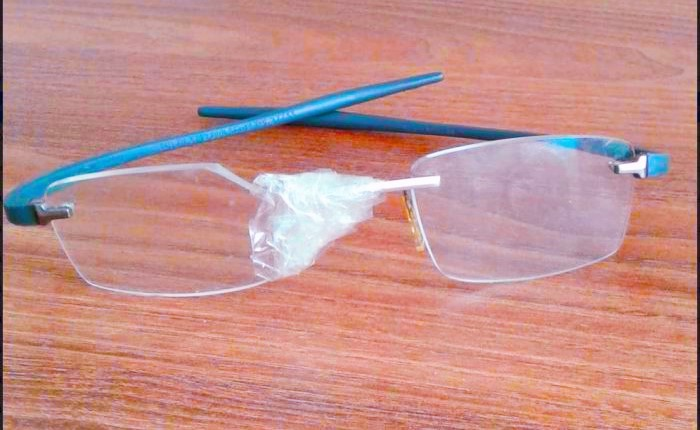
Gökhan Açıkkollu’s glasses displayed at the Tenkil Museum.

Gökhan Açıkkollu became one of the first and most prominent symbolic figures of the purges. The Tenkil Memorial Center dedicated a page to him, and his personal effects, including his broken glasses, are exhibited as part of a museum display documenting victims of alleged state violence. His case is frequently cited by human rights organizations as an example of alleged impunity and injustice during the state of emergency.

In later years, the case of Gökhan Açıkkollu continued to be raised in the Turkish Parliament. Member of Parliament Ömer Faruk Gergerlioğlu criticized the circumstances of his death and referred to him as a victim of injustice during a parliamentary commission session.

In 2023, a musical tribute video was published on YouTube titled "Gökhan'ıma Mektup", featuring a letter written and voiced by his wife, Tülay Açıkkollu. The video combined her text with the song "13 Gece" by Süvari Öztürk from his 2022 album Enkaz.
