= List of peace prizes =

This list of peace prizes is an index to articles on notable prizes awarded for contributions towards achieving or maintaining peace. The list is organized by region and country of the sponsoring organization, but many of the prizes are open to people from around the world.

== United Nations ==
Award	Sponsor	Year founded and notes
Félix Houphouët-Boigny Peace Prize	UNESCO	1991; for individuals and organizations who have made a significant contribution to promoting, seeking, safeguarding, or maintaining peace
N-Peace Awards	United Nations Development Programme	2010; for women making outstanding contributions in peace
UNESCO Prize for Peace Education	UNESCO	1981; excellent effort in the drive to reach a better quality education
UNESCO-Madanjeet Singh Prize	UNESCO	1996; for extraordinary creative achievements in promoting tolerance, as notable models for others in the field of peace-building
United Nations Peace Medal	United Nations	1971; commemorative medal produced by the United Nations to promote peace
UN Queensland Community Award	United Nations Association of Australia	For selfless and often uncelebrated efforts and commitment in their day-to-day lives relating to issues of peace, human rights, social justice, and equality

== Americas ==
Country	Award	Sponsor	Year founded and notes
Canada	Pearson Medal of Peace	United Nations Association in Canada	1979; to recognize an individual Canadian's "contribution to international service"
Canada	Calgary Peace Prize	Mount Royal University	2006; to individuals for global peace work
Canada	Stories of Peace Award	Canadian Peace Museum	2023
United States	Jane Addams Children's Book Award	Jane Addams Peace Association	1953; to a children's book that advances the causes of peace and social equality
United States	Women Building Peace Award	United States Institute of Peace	2019
United States	Community of Christ International Peace Award	Community of Christ	1993; honors and brings attention to the work of peacemaking and peacemakers in the world
United States	Dayton Literary Peace Prize	Dayton Literary Peace Prize Foundation	2006; recognizing the power of the written word to promote peace
United States	Dialog and Peace Award	Niagara Foundation	2006; individuals or organizations who have demonstrated strong commitment to serving their community while maintaining a global mindset
United States	Albert Einstein Peace Prize	Albert Einstein Peace Prize Foundation	1980
United States	El-Hibri Peace Education Prize	El-Hibri Foundation	2007; to celebrate and encourage individuals who embody the principles of peace, justice, and inclusion
United States	Gandhi Peace Award	Promoting Enduring Peace	1960; for contributions made in the promotion of international peace and good will
United States	Grawemeyer Award	University of Louisville	1988; ideas for improving world order
United States	World Methodist Peace Award	World Methodist Council	1976; for courage, creativity, and consistency in the cause for peace
United States	Pacem in Terris Award	Catholic Church	1964; to honor a person for their achievements in peace and justice, not only in their country but in the world
United States	Pope Paul VI Teacher of Peace Award	Pax Christi USA	1978; to an individual who has exemplified Pope Paul VI's World Day for Peace message: "To reach peace, teach peace."
United States	International Pfeffer Peace Award	Fellowship of Reconciliation (United States)	1989; to individuals or organizations whose commitment to peace, justice, and reconciliation is recognized as extraordinary
United States	Paul Bartlett Ré Peace Prize	University of New Mexico	2007; UNM student, faculty, staffmember, retiree, or alumnus who has demonstrated notable achievements in promoting world peace and understanding
United States	The US Peace Prize	US Peace Memorial Foundation	2009; recognizes the "most outstanding and prominent American antiwar leaders."
United States	War Resisters League Peace Award	War Resisters League	1958; to a person or organization whose work represents the League's radical nonviolent program of action
United States	World Peace Prize	World Peace Corps Mission	1989; to promote world peace and inter-religious understanding

== Asia ==
Country	Award	Sponsor	Year founded and notes
United Arab Emirates	UAE International Award for Poets of Peace	International Humanitarian City	2014; promote the peace message to the world
China	Confucius Peace Prize	China International Peace Studies Center	2010; to promote world peace from an Eastern perspective, and Confucian peace specifically
India	Indira Gandhi Award for National Integration	Indian National Congress	1987; promote national integration, understanding, and fellowship amongst religious groups, ethnic groups, cultures, languages, and traditions of India
India	Indira Gandhi Prize	Indira Gandhi Memorial Trust	1986; to individuals or organisations in recognition of creative efforts toward promoting international peace, development, and a new international economic order
India	Gandhi Mandela Awards	Gandhi Mandela Foundation	2019; Peace, Social Welfare, Culture, Health Care, Sports, Education, and Innovation
India	Gandhi Peace Prize	Government of India	1995; Contributions towards social, economic, and political transformation through nonviolence and other Gandhian methods
Japan	Niwano Peace Prize	Niwano Peace Foundation	1983; for interreligious cooperation in the cause of peace
Philippines	Gusi Peace Prize	Gusi Peace Prize Foundation	2002; recognizes individuals and organizations who contribute to global peace and progress through a wide variety of fields
Philippines	Ramon Magsaysay Award	Ramon Magsaysay Award Foundation	1958; contributions in Government Service, Public Service, Community Leadership, Journalism, Literature and Creative Communication Arts, Peace and International Understanding, and Emergent Leadership
South Korea	Manhae Prize	The Society for the Promotion and Practice of Manhae's Thoughts	2008; Peace, Social Service, Academic Excellence, Art, Literature, and Buddhist Missionary Work
South Korea	Seoul Peace Prize	Seoul Peace Prize Cultural Foundation	1990; to crystallize the wishes of the Korean people for peace in the Korean peninsula and the rest of the world
South Korea	Sunhak Peace Prize	Sunhak Peace Prize Committee	2015; enduring contributions to help resolve worldwide suffering, conflict, poverty, and threats to the environment, by promoting a comprehensive, future-oriented vision of peace

== Europe ==
Country	Award	Sponsor	Year founded and notes
Europe	European Medal of Tolerance	European Council on Tolerance and Reconciliation	2010; Honour and reward extraordinary creative achievements in the promotion of tolerance
Belgium	Pax Christi International Peace Award	Pax Christi International	1988; those who stand up for peace, justice, and nonviolence across the globe
Finland	World Peace Council prizes	World Peace Council	1950; Called the International Peace Prize from 1949 to 1957, Joliot-Curie Medal of Peace afterwards
Germany / Poland	Brückepreis (Bridge prize)	Town of Görlitz/Zgorzelec	1993; person who contributed by a life's work to better understanding between peoples in Europe
Germany	Civis Media Prize	CIVIS Media Foundation	1988; for radio and television broadcasting projects that promote peaceful coexistence within the European immigration community
Germany	Friedenspreis des Deutschen Buchhandels (Peace Prize of the German book trade)	Börsenverein des Deutschen Buchhandels	1950; for individuals who have contributed to ideals of tolerance through their exceptional activities, especially in the fields of literature, science, and art
Germany	Otto Hahn Peace Medal	United Nations Association of Germany	1988; for outstanding services to peace, tolerance, and international understanding
Germany	Sean MacBride Peace Prize	International Peace Bureau	1992; person or organisation who has done outstanding work for peace, disarmament, and/or human rights
Germany	Stuttgart Peace Prize	Die AnStifter	2003; To people or projects involved in a special way for peace, justice, and world solidarity
Germany	Westphalian Peace Prize	Wirtschaftlichen Gesellschaft für Westfalen und Lippe	1998; for exceptional commitment to sustainable peace and international understanding
Ireland	Tipperary International Peace Award	Tipperary Peace Convention	1984; To give recognition to those who promote the ideals of peace and peaceful co-operation both in Ireland and abroad.
Italy	Art, Science and Peace Prize	Man Center and World Interreligious Center	2002; artists and scientists who have worked for peace and the welfare of society and the world
Italy	Man of Peace	World Summit of Nobel Peace Laureates	1999; personalities from the world of culture and entertainment who have stood up for human rights and for the spread of the principles of peace and solidarity in the world, who made an outstanding contribution to international social justice and peace
Italy	Premio Testimone di Pace	President of Italy	2007; person, organization, or association particularly distinguished for their commitment and action in the context of peace and nonviolence
Luxembourg	Luxembourg Peace Prize	Schengen Peace Foundation	2012; world wide for building outstanding peace and/or a culture of outstanding peace across thirteen categories: activist, youth, organisation, public effort, education, peace support, technology, journalism, peace process, environmental, inner peace, art, sport
Netherlands	International Children's Peace Prize	KidsRights Foundation	2005; child who has made a significant contribution to advocating children's rights and improving the situation of vulnerable children such as orphans, child labourers, and children with HIV/AIDS
Netherlands	OPCW–The Hague Award	Organisation for the Prohibition of Chemical Weapons	2014; individuals and institutions who have significantly contributed towards the goal of a world free of chemical weapons
Netherlands	Wateler Peace Prize	Carnegie Foundation (Netherlands)	1931; for being meritorious in the cause of peace
Norway	Nobel Peace Prize	Norwegian Nobel Committee	1901; for doing the most or best work for fraternity between nations, for the abolition or reduction of standing armies. and for the holding and promotion of peace congresses
Norway	Student Peace Prize	Student Peace Prize Secretariat	1999; student or student organization making a significant contribution to creating peace and promoting human rights Malenius Peace Prize
Spain	ICIP Peace in Progress Award	International Catalan Institute for Peace	2011; People, entities, or institutions who have worked and contributed prominently and extensively in promoting and constructing peace
Sweden	Right Livelihood Award	Right Livelihood	1980; practical and exemplary solutions to the most urgent challenges facing the world today
Switzerland	Balzan Prize	International Balzan Prize Foundation	1961; outstanding achievements in the fields of humanities, natural sciences, and culture, as well as for endeavours for peace and the brotherhood of man
Switzerland	FIFA Peace Prize	FIFA	2025; created by FIFA President Gianni Infantino to "reward individuals who have taken exceptional and extraordinary actions for peace and by doing so have united people across the world"
Switzerland	Giuseppe Motta Medal	Geneva Institute for Democracy and Development	2004; People from any country or region of the world for exceptional achievement in the promotion of peace and democracy, human rights, and sustainable development
United Kingdom	Ahmadiyya Muslim Peace Prize	Ahmadiyya	2009; Individual's or organisation's contribution for the advancement of the cause of peace

== Oceania ==
Country	Award	Sponsor	Year founded and notes
Australia	UN Queensland Community Award	United Nations Association of Australia	For selfless and often uncelebrated efforts and commitment in their day-to-day lives relating to issues of peace, human rights, social justice, and equality
Australia	Sydney Peace Prize	University of Sydney	1998; promotes peace with justice and the practice of nonviolence

== Former awards ==
Country	Award	Sponsor	Years awarded and to whom
	U Thant Peace Award	Sri Chinmoy	1982–2007
Australia	Australian Peace Prize	Peace Organisation of Australia	2006–2009; to an Australian citizen or resident, or a group based in Australia, for outstanding contributions towards peace
Australia	UNAA Media Peace Awards	United Nations Association of Australia	1979–2018; presented on UN Day, to recognise Australian journalists and media organisations for promotion of human rights and issues
Soviet Union	Lenin Peace Prize	Soviet Union	1949–1990; began as Stalin Peace Prize from 1949–1955. After Nikita Khrushchev's denunciation of Stalin in 1956 during the Twentieth Party Congress it was renamed for Vladimir Lenin. Last awarded in 1990; for notable individuals who strengthened peace among comrades
United Nations	Millennium Peace Prize for Women	United Nations Development Fund for Women	2001; awarded as part of International Alert's "Women Building Peace" campaign
United States	American Peace Award	a group of artists	1923, 2008–2011; created by Edward Bok
United States	Atoms for Peace Award	independent nonprofit	1957–1969; for the development or application of peaceful nuclear technology

== See also ==
- List of peace activists
- List of awards for contributions to society
- Lists of awards
