= Niagara Apothecary =

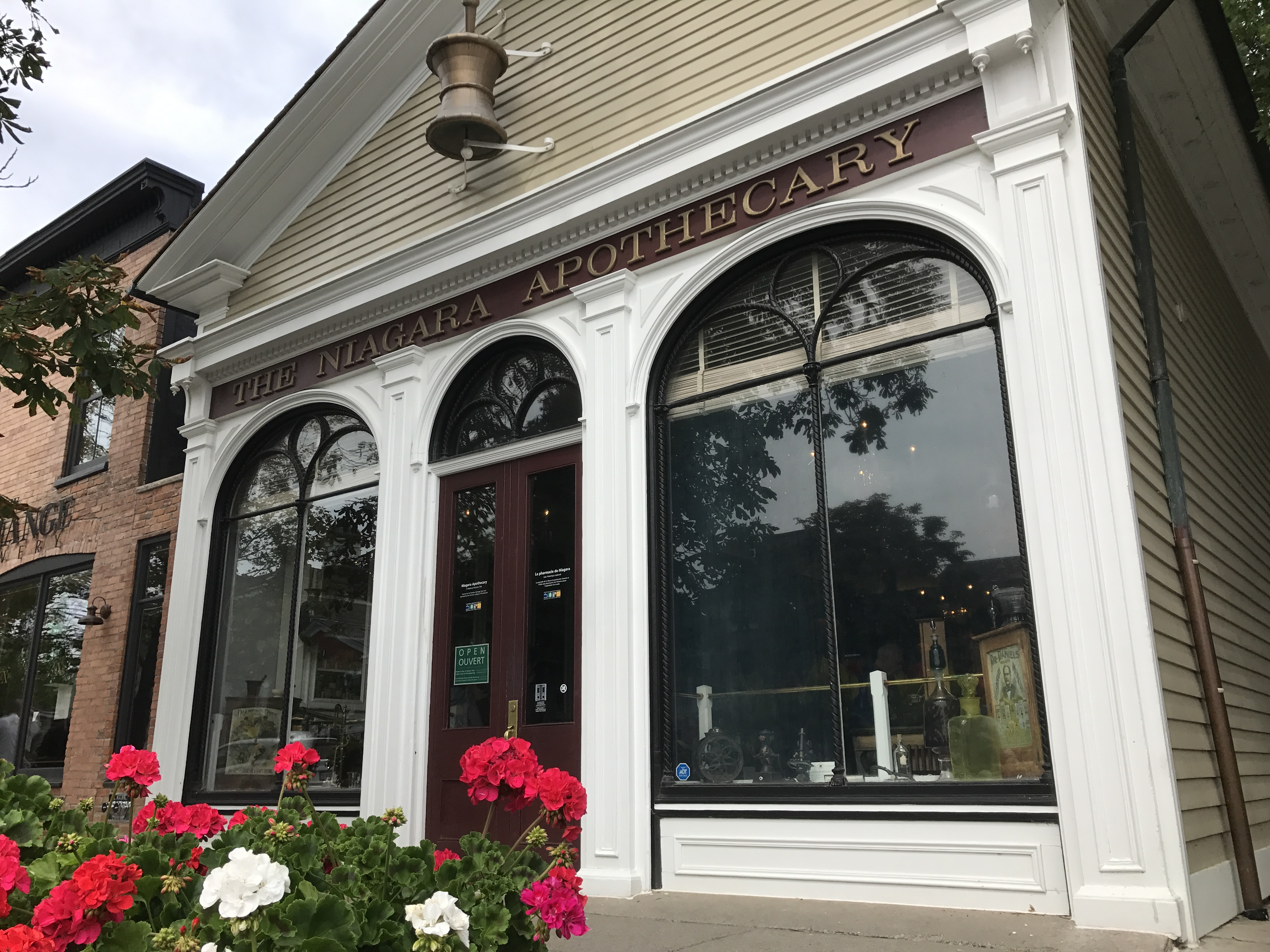
- Façade, with a mortar and pestle mounted on the gable
- Interactive map of the Niagara Apothecary area
- Former names: The Niagara Apothecary at the Sign of the Golden Mortar (1818 or later – 1820s); Starkwather and Brown (early 1820s); Niagara Apothecary and Cheap Cash Store (1820s); Niagara Apothecary (1829–1833); Randall's Drug Store (1898–1914); Coyne Drugs (1914–1921); Field's Drugstore (1921–1964)

General information
- Type: Museum
- Architectural style: Georgian
- Location: 5 Queen Street, Niagara-on-the-Lake, Ontario, Canada
- Coordinates: 43°15′18″N 79°04′15″W
- Estimated completion: 1818–1820
- Renovated: 1970 – 13 May 1971
- Renovation cost: $38,000, equivalent to CA$307,000 in 2025
- Owner: Ontario Heritage Trust

Technical details
- Floor count: 1

Renovating team
- Architect: Peter John Stokes

National Historic Site of Canada
- Official name: Niagara Apothecary National Historic Site of Canada
- Designated: 28 November 1968

The Niagara Apothecary was an apothecary in Niagara-on-the-Lake, Ontario, established no later than 1820, and is now a National Historic Site of Canada. It was operated by a series of successive owners, most of whom had apprenticed under the preceding owner. In the 1960s, it was purchased by the Niagara Foundation, which targeted the building and its contents for preservation. It was purchased by the provincially-owned Ontario Heritage Foundation in 1969, which undertook a preservation effort culminating in May 1971, when the property was re-opened as a museum.

The museum is rendered as a typical Confederation-era apothecary. It is operated by the Ontario College of Pharmacy, and receives about 100,000 visitors annually.

== Background ==
In the 1960s, there was increasing interest in Ontario for the historic preservation of buildings to prevent their demolition. In Niagara-on-the-Lake, an economic decline that began in the late 19th century left the town with plenty of its early buildings, no "unsightly factories, warehouses, or tracts of undistinguished workers' housing", and a "pre-industrial, upper-class streetscape". The end of World War II sparked development, so at a town planning board meeting held on 5 February 1962, a proposal was made to establish a local heritage organization. Later that year, after lobbying the Government of Ontario, provincial legislation was passed to charter the Niagara Foundation.

This foundation soon requested the federal National Historic Sites Service to conduct an architectural survey of the town. It was accepted, and became a pilot project for the national inventory of historic buildings. The local survey was conducted by architect Peter John Stokes, who was the "foremost architectural historian" of the province at the time. He identified "interesting old buildings", among them Field's Drugstore, owned since 1921 by increasingly ailing proprietor E.W. Field. From the 1860s until the survey was conducted, only minor exterior modifications had been made to the building, and its interior fixtures and layout had remained "remarkably intact". Fearing that the store would be sold, the Niagara Foundation approached the Ontario College of Pharmacy (OCP) in 1963 to propose a partnership to preserve the building and its contents. The proposal was accepted, with the OCP considering the site for a museum of pharmacy history.

Field retired in 1964, and the partnership rented the store and obtained right of first refusal to purchase the property. Lacking funds to make the purchase when Field died the following year, in December 1965 the partners secured a promise from James Auld, the provincial Minister of Tourism and Information, that the provincial ministry would acquire the property, enabling the Niagara Foundation to exercise its option. Two years later, the Ministry of Tourism and Information still had not acted on the minister's promise, so the partnership undertook its own plans for restoration. The success of the Canadian Centennial anniversary celebrations throughout Canada that year provided impetus to fund similar projects provincially, and in July a provincial grant of $15,000 was made to the Niagara Foundation, which it used to discharge its mortgage.

In early 1968, the Ontario Heritage Trust (OHF) was established, and restoration of Field's Drugstore became its first project. It solicited and received commitment from the federal government to cover half the cost of the restoration project, and on 10 July 1969 the OHF purchased the property from the Niagara Foundation.

== Restoration ==
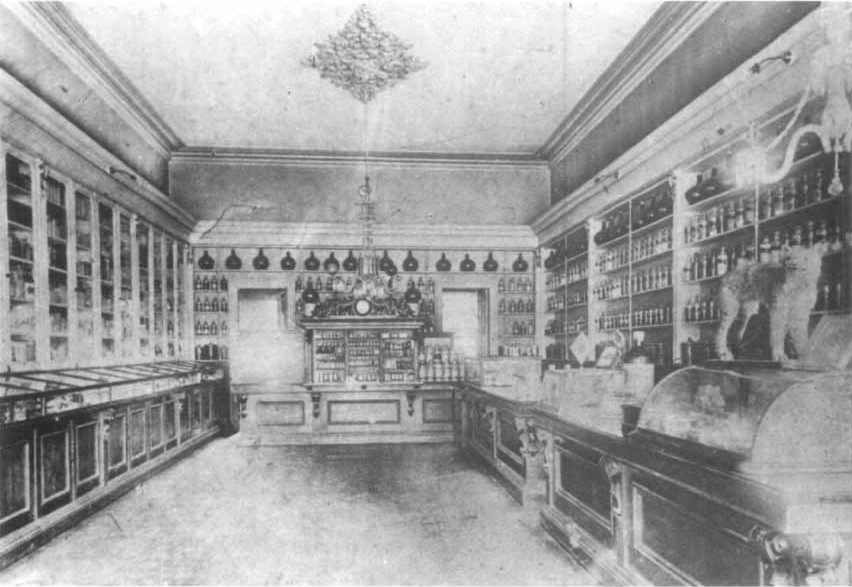
One of the photographs on which the restoration was based, depicting the interior of the Randall's Drug Store sometimes between 1900 and 1910.

On 8 August 1962, Stokes had identified and catalogued a number of sites for the survey he conducted of potential local heritage sites. In the catalogue, he noted that Field's Drugstore was "of historic significance to the town" and to "restore if possible". Among the features he cited were the building's façade, intricate wood carving, cabinetry, and "ornate plaster-work".

In April 1970, the provincial OHF and the federal Indian Affairs and Northern Development department signed a contract to fund the CA$38,000 project (equivalent to $307,000 in 2025). Stokes was hired to manage the project. With little information about the site having been published throughout its history, Stokes referred to photographs from 1905 and later, and the underlying physical attributes present in the early 1970s, to guide the restoration. The goal was material authenticity of the restored site, using paint colours and finishes that would have been present in the 1860s. Missing parts were made by obtaining similar material from another building of the same era using techniques employed at the time.

Objects inconsistent with the historical preservation, such as commercial signs, were removed. The structure was reinforced, and all surfaces were polished or painted. In the weeks leading up to the 14 May 1971 opening of the newly-created museum, pharmacists arranged the artefacts while the renovation crew completed its work. The opening was attended by Fern Guindon (Auld's successor) representing the provincial Ministry of Tourism and Information, James McNulty representing the federal Indian Affairs and Northern Development department, local politicians, Stokes, and some members of the OCP. The next day, the Niagara Foundation hosted the "House Tour and Pharmacy Gala" to a large crowd.

== Ownership ==
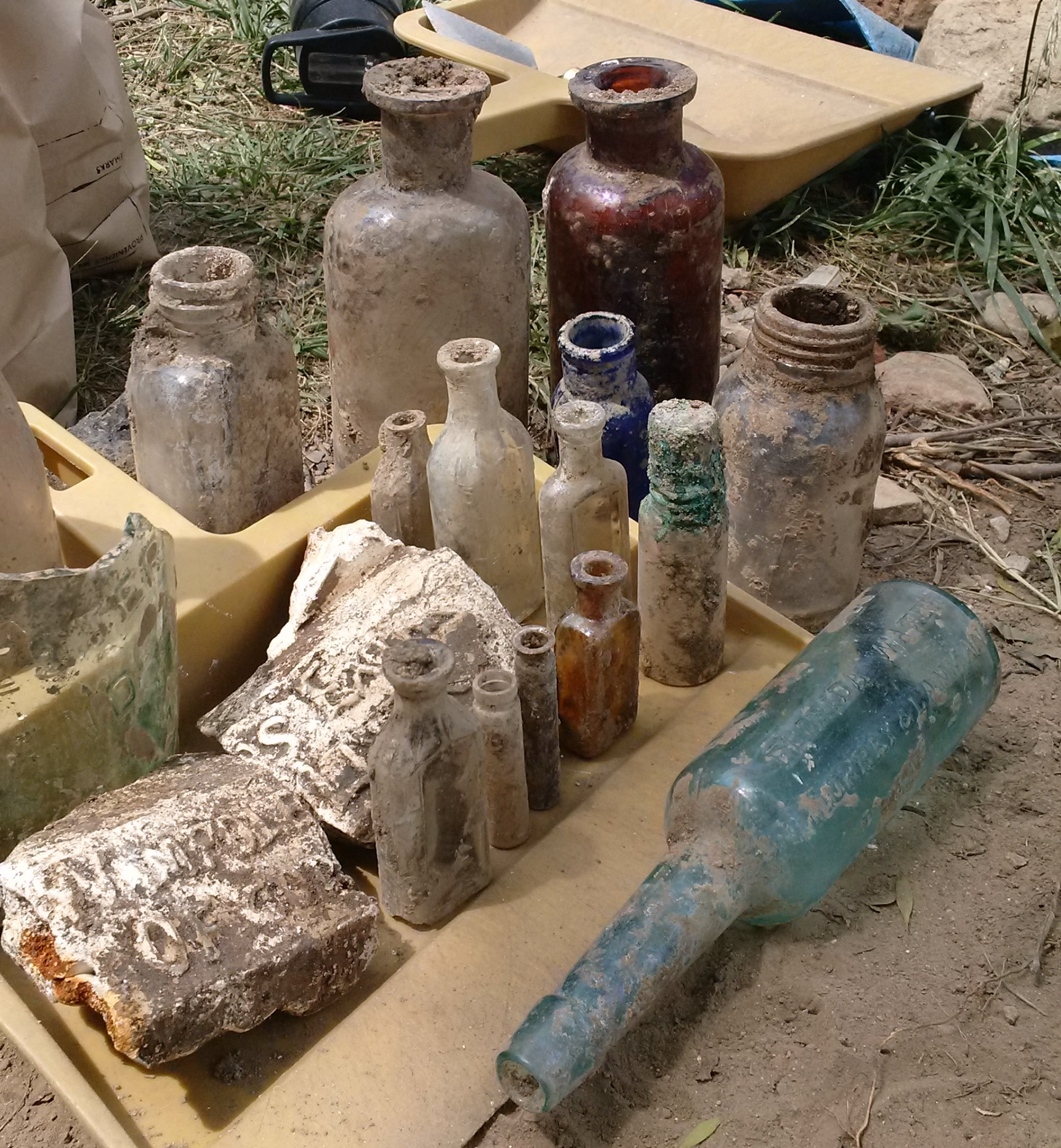
Bottles excavated at the site in June 2016

The building is located on Lot 64m, a property deeded to William Dickson in 1796 by The Crown. The original pharmacy had been located on Prideaux Street, which was moved to another lot on Queen Street by its owner Rodman Starkwather. In 1833, Starkwather sold his business to James Harvey, who operated it until his death from pulmonary tuberculosis in October 1851. It is thought that during his proprietorship, many of the artefacts currently on display at the museum were imported from England, including the glass bottles. In early 1852, Harvey's heirs sold the business to Henry Paffard, who had been an apprentice to Harvey. In 1866, when also the mayor of the town, arson damaged both his house and the pharmacy. He bought the current building from Edward Campbell in 1869, making significant renovations to it, among them lowering the floor, raising the ceiling, and installing black walnut counters and an ornate dispensary.

After operating the business for 46 years, Paffard sold it in 1898 to his apprentice John DeWolfe Randall. DeWolfe died, likely of a stroke, on 13 March 1914, and the business was purchased by Arthur J. Coyne, who operated it until 1922. He also operated a pharmacy in St. Catharines, and in 1922 decided to focus his efforts there, selling the Niagara-on-the-Lake drugstore to Erland Field. However, Coyne kept about 200 glass bottles and other containers that had been purchased by Harvey. Field would operate the business until 1964, when his ailing health forced him to retire, and he granted the Niagara Foundation and Ontario College of Pharmacy the right of first refusal.

The Niagara Foundation bought the property, and in 1969 sold it to the Ontario Heritage Foundation. In 1970, the Niagara Foundation and Ontario College of Pharmacy signed a contract with the Ontario Heritage Foundation, by which the latter would restore and maintain the building, and the Ontario College of Pharmacy would restore the apothecary and operate it.

== History ==
Because of the unregulated nature of pharmaceutical enterprises throughout much of the 19th century and early 20th century, drugs were sold at many establishments, including bookstores and general stores. Pharmacies likewise engaged in other commercial activities. During its lifetime, the Niagara Apothecary at times sold gasoline, postal insurance, veterinary supplies, marine supplies, ice cream, soft drinks, and tickets for train and boat. From the 1820s to 1840, Starkwather and Brown advertised in the Colonial Advocate the availability of garden seeds "of all descriptions" collected by the Shakers of New Lebanon in New York. It also provided services, such as use of a telephone, and photographic services and supplies.

The records of the Niagara Apothecary suggest "habitual drug use" amongst a subset of its clientele, including those who self-medicated leading to addiction. About 50 clients between 1853 and 1875 regularly purchased narcotic drugs. In many, if not the majority of, cases clients received pharmaceutical drugs "without the benefit of medical authority".

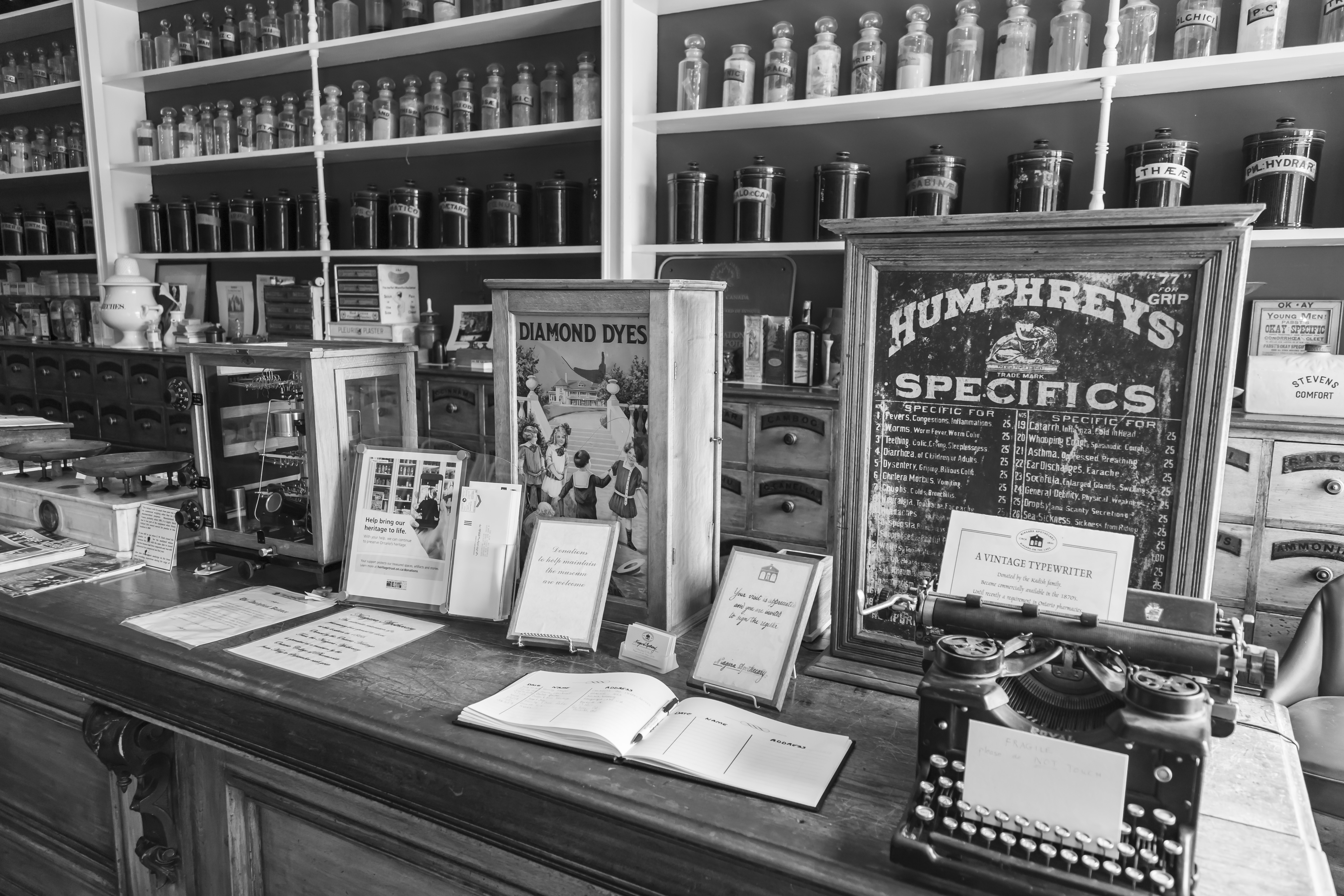

== Description ==
The single-storey building is a clapboard-clad structure in the Georgian style. It is flush with the sidewalk on Queen Street, the town's principal commercial area. The exterior decorations and embellishments are a vernacular commingling of various styles, including Palladian revival entrance, wood trim, and clapboard cladding, and Italianate tripartite facade of display windows flanking the entrance and separated by pilasters.

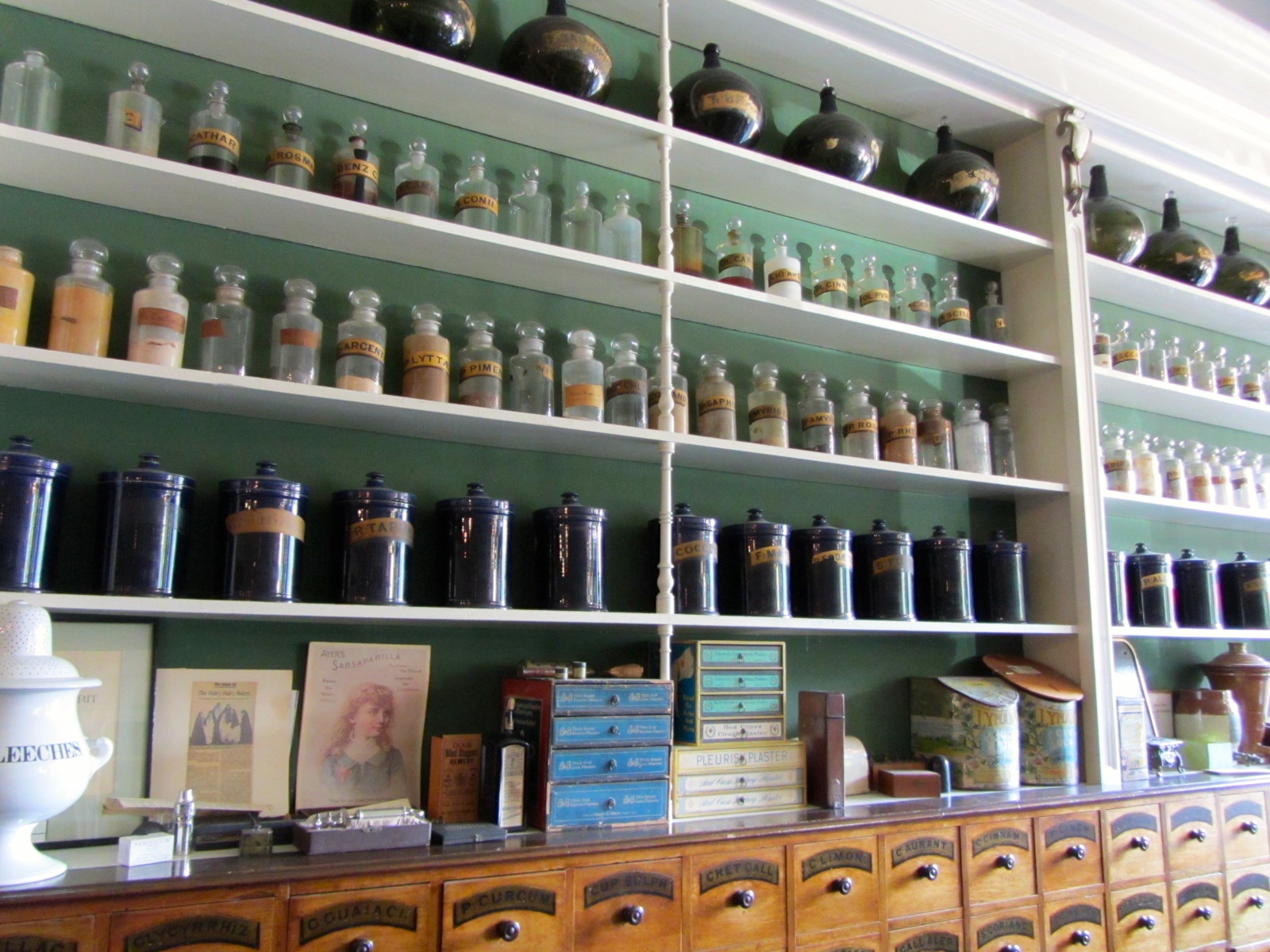
Drawers, and shelving housing various bottles and other artefacts

The interior is furnished and decorated in a style typical of a Confederation-era apothecary. The counters and cabinets, made of black walnut and butternut, are complemented by an ornate wooden dispensary and a crystal gasolier. The dispensary includes a clock, a carved beaver, and two light globes held by female figures. Venetian blinds, hanging from the window valance dating to 1866, were disused for a period when an awning was installed.

The glass bottles, jars, and pots that line the shelves are the same ones that had been taken by Coyne in 1922. He had sold some of them to a private party, and these would later be purchased by the Academy of Medicine in Toronto. The Academy of Medicine loaned these to the Ontario College of Pharmacy for use at the Niagara Apothecary. The remainder were sold by Coyne's widow to the Ontario College of Pharmacy. Other artefacts displayed at the museum were obtained from private donors, the Faculty of Pharmacy at the University of Toronto, and from the collection of the Ontario College of Pharmacy.

The building is notable for being the only one in the town surviving from Confederation, when the drug store was moved to its present location in 1866.

== National Historic Site ==
The restoration of the Niagara Apothecary has been referred to as "one of the early and great triumphs of heritage preservation in the province of Ontario". It was designated a National Historic Site of Canada on 28 November 1968 and listed on the Canadian Register on 25 March 2008. A plaque was installed outside the building and was unveiled by Queen Elizabeth The Queen Mother on 5 July 1981.

In a paper published in Material Culture Review in late 1985, author Ernst Stieb described it as "the most authentic restoration of its kind in Canada and perhaps in North America". The museum is operated by the Ontario College of Pharmacy, and is visited by about 100,000 tourists annually. On 5 June 1973, the American Association of State and Local History presented an Award of Merit to the Ontario Heritage Foundation and the Ontario College of Pharmacy for the restoration of the apothecary.

The restoration was consistent with early apothecaries in Ontario, but did not capture the intent of Spafford, who became owner of the drugstore in 1852, to modernize the facility and differentiate it from his competitors. The museum's focus is the historical practice of pharmacy, not the retail operation. The authenticity of the museum is primarily in the use of materials, as the name is ahistorical (the term "apothecary" is anachronistic for the period represented by the museum) and the practice involved other activities.
