= Palathulli =

Water conservation campaign in Kerala, India

The Palathulli (Malayalam:പലതുള്ളി, English: Many a Drop) program is a water conservation campaign run by the Malayala Manorama newspaper in Kerala, India, for raising awareness on the importance of water conservation and rainwater harvesting.

The campaign included exhibitions and video shows which were organized throughout the region.

The newspaper was awarded the 2005 IPDC-UNESCO Prize for Rural Communication.

== See also ==
- IPDC
- UNESCO
