= Essl =

Essl or ESSL may refer to:

- Essl Social Prize
- The ICAO code of Linköping/Saab Airport in Linköping, Sweden
- European Severe Storms Laboratory, a non-profit organization dedicated to basic and applied research on severe convective storms
- OpenGL ES Shading Language, a shading language designed for embedded devices

== People ==
- Karlheinz Essl (b. 1960), Austrian composer
- Georg Essl (b. 1972), Austrian computer scientist and musician
- Michaela Eßl (b. 1988), Austrian ski mountaineer

== Association ==
- ESSL Basket-ball, a basket-ball club of a small town : Saint-Léger-aux-Bois - Oise - FRANCE
