= Development and Educational Communication Unit =

Indian research organization

- Formation: 1989
- Dissolved: 2023 merged with Space Applications Centre
- Type: Arm of the Indian Space Research Organisation
- Purpose: Planning and imparting training for the usage of satellite-based communication systems for societal needs
- Headquarters: Space Applications Centre -Ahmedabad
- Location: Ahmedabad
- Region served: India
- Parent organization: Indian Space Research Organisation
- Website: Official ISRO DECU

Development and Educational Communication Unit is an arm of ISRO which aims at planning and imparting training the personnel for usage of satellite based communication systems for societal needs. The main objective of the organisation is to plan and envisage satellite usage for the general population in domains such as education and medicine, as well as many others.

== History ==
Established in 1989, the Development and Educational Communication Unit of the Indian Space Research Organisation (ISRO) has been involved in societal research with the objective of bringing India's indigenously developed space technology back to the people of rural India. The Space Applications Centre, Ahmedabad provides the necessary technical support to the unit. Between 1975 and 1990, this unit implemented the Kheda Communications Project in the Kheda village of Gujarat to bring satellite-based communication to the village residents. This project would go on to receive the IPDC-UNESCO Prize for Rural Communication. In 2023, the Development and Educational Communication Unit merged with the Space Applications Centre.

== Projects ==
=== Kheda Communications Projects ===
Started in 1975, KCP was India's first rural communication project. KCP aimed at providing television broadcasting and allied communication services to the targeted rural areas. KCP was a joint collaboration between the Government of India, the United States Government and the United Nations. The United Nations Development Program (UNDP) donated low cost transmitters and satellite earth stations to this project. About 650 television sets were distributed to nearly 400 villages in this project. The project received the 1985 IPDC-UNESCO Prize for Rural Communication. The project was subsequently taken as a reference for implementation of the GRAMSAT pilot project. The Kheda Communication Project continued its operations until 1990.

=== Jhabua Development Communications Project ===
Jhabua Development Communications Project had evolved out from Kheda Communication projects. Watershed management, health, education and panchayati raj are the mission purpose of this project. The JDCP has 2 components:

- Broadcasting of information and
- Interactive training programmes

JDCP along with the kheda and EduSat have proven to be successful means to communicate to the remote areas of the country and to provide them an information medium at a reasonably cost.

=== EduSat ===
DECU supported the implementation of the EduSat project by installing devices for audio-video data transmission. EduSat is the flagship project of the Department of Science and Technology (India) which aims at providing education to the masses by using a satellite-based transmission system.
