= Open Society Foundation for South Africa =

South African non-profit organization

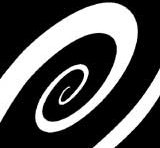
- Founded: 1993
- Founder: George Soros
- Location: Cape Town, South Africa
- Region served: South Africa
- Key people: Fatima Hassan
- Website: www.osf.org.za

The Open Society Foundation for South Africa is a South African non-profit grant-making organisation that supports the civil society sector. Its mission is to "promote the values, institutions and practices of an open, non-racial and non-sexist, democratic civil society."

== Organization ==
The foundation was established by George Soros in 1993, just prior to the dismantling of apartheid and South Africa's transition to democracy.

From 2013 to 2019, its Executive Director was Fatima Hassan a human rights lawyer and social justice activist.

The organisation is connected to the Open Society Foundations.

== See also ==
- Open Society Foundations
- Open Society Initiative for Southern Africa
- Open Society Initiative for East Africa
- Open Society Initiative for West Africa
