= Calgary Peace Prize =

Canadian peace award

- Awarded for: Lifelong contribution to peace
- Location: Calgary, Canada
- Presented by: Calgary Peace Prize Committee
- First award: 2006; 20 years ago

The Calgary Peace Prize is an annual Canadian award that is given by an independent committee in Calgary, Alberta.

The purpose of the award is to recognize individuals globally for their work supporting peace, "making the world a more just, safer and less violent place."

== History ==
The University of Calgary established the Calgary Peace Prize in 2006. The coordination of it shifted to Mount Royal University in 2016 during the creation of the John de Chastelain Peace Initiative. As of 2017, the prize was $8,000 and was awarded annually in April.

As of 2019, Mark Ayyash, who serves as the director of the Initiative, oversees the prize.

== Selection criteria ==
The award is given only to someone with a who has made a lifelong commitment to peace. Anyone can nominate someone. The winner is selected by a six-person committee of people from Calgary.

== Winners by year ==
Year	Winner	Reference
2006	Tadatoshi Akiba	
2007	No winner	
2008	Prince Hassan bin Talal	
2009	Louise Arbour	
2010	Sally Armstrong	
2011	Vandana Shiva	
2012	Izzeldin Abuelaish	
2013	Emmanuel Jal	
2014	Samantha Nutt	
2015	Roméo Dallaire	
2016	Murray Sinclair	
2016	Marie Wilson	
2016	Wilton Littlechild	
2017	Douglas Roche	
2018	Rosalie Abella	
2019	Anote Tong	
2020	Stephanie Nolen	
2021	No winner	
2022	Fatima Hassan	
2023	Mohammed El-Kurd	

== See also ==
- List of peace prizes
