= International Catalan Institute for Peace =

Organization in Spain

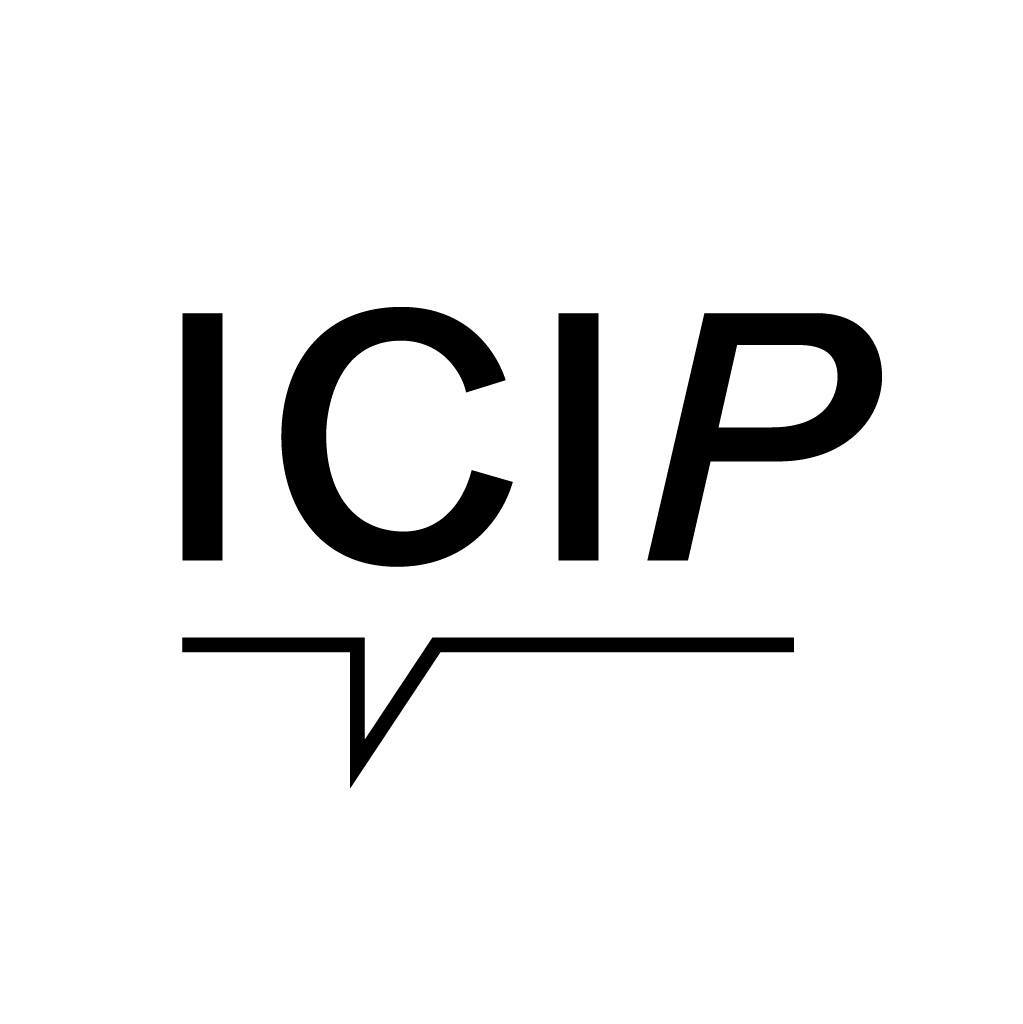

The International Catalan Institute for Peace (ICIP) is a research, dissemination, and action organization created by the Parliament of Catalonia in 2007 to promote peace in Catalan society and internationally.

The ICIP is an independent public institution with its own legal personality. It aims to support public administrations, the academic world and civil society and reports to Parliament, the government, and the citizenry.

== Organization ==
ICIP is structured with a working team and a Governing Board made up of personalities from the peace field, with seven chosen by Parliament and three appointed by the government.

Xavier Masllorens Escubós has been the President of ICIP since July 2016. He is an activist in social movements and a member of the advisory board of Fundesplai. He is also a psychologist and a graduate in Business Administration and Management and Strategic Marketing. He was previously the president of FundiPau (Foundation for Peace). He was also the director of various social third sector organizations: Oxfam-Intermón, Office of the Ombudsperson of Catalonia, Dincat (Intellectual Disability Catalonia), and Education without Borders.

Kristian Herbolzheimer Jeppson has worked as the Director of ICIP since September 2018. Herbolzheimer holds a degree in Agriculture Engineering (University of Lleida, 1994) and a Diploma in Peace Culture (Escola de Cultura de Pau, Autonomous University of Barcelona, 2001), and he earned a master's degree in International Peacebuilding from the Kroc Institute for International Peace Studies (University of Notre Dame, 2009).

== Fields of work ==
The activity of ICIP is articulated around four areas of work from which the organization of seminars and conferences, publications and different initiatives for the dissemination and promotion of the culture of peace is derived. The four areas of work are 'Memory, coexistence and reconciliation'; 'Violence in non-war settings'; 'Social and political dialogue'; and 'Alternatives of security'.

== ICIP Peace in Progress Award ==
The ICIP Governing Board has awarded the ICIP Peace in Progress Award every year since 2011 to publicly recognize people, entities, or institutions that have worked and contributed prominently and extensively in promoting and constructing peace. It consists of public recognition, a sculpture created by the Nobel Peace Prize winner, artist and activist Adolfo Pérez Esquivel, Porta del Sol, and an economic endowment of 6,000 euros. The award ceremony takes place annually in an institutional ceremony at the Parliament of Catalonia.

The following people have been given this award:

- 2011: Pepe Beúnza, the first objector of political conscience in Spain.
- 2012: Mothers of Soacha (Luz Marina Bernal, Carmenza Gómez, Maria Sanabria, Melida Bermúdez y Lucero Carmona). Soacha is a town near Bogotá. Granted for their fight against paramilitary actions in their country.
- 2013: Jovan Divjak, the Bosnian general who organized the defence of Sarajevo during the 1200-day siege between 1992 and 1995.
- 2014: Women's International League for Peace and Freedom (WILPF), for its centennial career in women's work for peace, commitment to disarmament, advocacy for human rights and persistence to gain recognition for the role of women in peacebuilding.
- 2015: Joan Botam, for his task in favour of peace and defence of interreligious dialogue.
- 2016: Brigades Internacionals de Pau.
- 2017: Arcadi Oliveres, in recognition of his commitment and tireless dedication to promoting peace, social justice, human rights and disarmament.
- 2018: Cauce Ciudadano, for the work of the Mexican entity in the prevention and creation of opportunities for young people in environments with a lot of violence
- 2019: Collective of Families of Missing Persons in Algeria (CDFAS).
- 2020: Julienne Lusenge, human rights, peace and security activist in the Democratic Republic of the Congo.
- 2022: The Basque Country's associative network in favour of peace.
- 2023: Women Victims of War and Forgotten Children of War from Bosnia and Herzegovina.
