= UNESCO-Bangladesh Bangabandhu Sheikh Mujibur Rahman International Prize for the Creative Economy =

UNESCO award to support young entrepreneurs

- Awarded for: exceptional initiatives that support young entrepreneurs in the field of the creative economy.
- Location: UNESCO Headquarters, Paris, France
- First award: 2021
- Final award: 2023

The Bangabandhu Sheikh Mujibur Rahman International Prize for the Creative Economy is an award established by the United Nations Educational, Scientific and Cultural Organization (UNESCO) that rewards innovative initiatives that promote the creative economy. The prize is named after Bangabandhu Sheikh Mujibur Rahman, one of the founding leader of Bangladesh.

The Prize is created to recognise and reward exceptional initiatives of an individual, institution, an entity or non-governmental organizations(NGO) which/who, devised and delivered innovative projects or programmes that promote youth entrepreneurship in the creative economy.

The award was created in 2020 in collaboration with the Government of Bangladesh, which sought to highlight the importance of the creative economy as a driving force for sustainable development.

The prize is awarded every two years to individuals, organizations, or institutions that have made significant contributions to the creative economy. Nominations are submitted by UNESCO member states and international organization.

It is awarded to only one winner every two years. The awardee is to receive 50,000 USD, a trophy and certificate in recognition of its contribution. The Prize is funded by the Government of Bangladesh.

== Award winners ==
2021 - MoTIV Creation (Uganda).

2023 - Musics Crossroads (Zimbabwe).

== See also ==
- List of awards for contributions to society
- Begum Rokeya Padak
- Jamnalal Bajaj Award
