= List of awards for contributions to society =

This list of awards for contributions to society is an index to articles on notable awards for contributions to society. It excludes humanitarian and service awards, religion-related awards, peace prizes, law enforcement awards and honors and legal awards, which are covered by separate lists. The list is organized by region and country of the award sponsor, but some awards are open to people or organizations around the world.

== Awards ==
Country	Award	Venue / sponsor	Notes
Australia	Community Award	United Nations Association of Australia (Queensland)	"Selfless and often uncelebrated efforts and commitment in their day-to-day lives relating to issues of peace, human rights, social justice and equality — efforts that serve to better the society we live in".
Austria	Essl Social Prize	Essl Foundation	Projects developed by social entrepreneurs
Bangladesh	Begum Rokeya Padak	Ministry of Women & Children Affairs	Pioneering contribution of an individual in empowering women and raising women's issues.
International	UNESCO-Bangladesh Bangabandhu Sheikh Mujibur Rahman International Prize for the Creative Economy	UNESCO	An award from UNESCO that rewards exceptional initiatives that support young entrepreneurs in the field of the creative economy.
Denmark	Crown Prince Couple's Awards	Frederik, Crown Prince of Denmark, Mary, Crown Princess of Denmark	Exceptional achievement in the arts and culture and in social work
Europe	European Citizens' Prize	European Parliament	Projects and initiatives that contribute to European cooperation and the promotion of common values
Germany	German Africa Prize	German Africa Foundation	Promote peace, democracy, social market economy and human rights
India	Jamnalal Bajaj Award	Bajaj Group	Promoting Gandhian values, community service and social development
India	Nari Shakti Puraskar	President of India	Achievements and contributions of women
International	IPDC-UNESCO Prize for Rural Communication	International Programme for the Development of Communication	Initiatives for improving communication in rural communities, mainly in developing countries
International	UN Nelson Rolihlahla Mandela Prize	United Nations	Service to humanity, in the promotion of reconciliation and social cohesion, and in community development
Jamaica	Prime Minister's Medal of Appreciation	Prime Minister of Jamaica	Significant contribution to the economic, social, cultural or political development of Jamaica or to Jamaicans residing abroad
Japan	Nikkei Asia Prize	The Nikkei	People in Asia who have made significant contributions in regional growth; science, technology and innovation; or culture
Kosovo	Hero of Kosovo	President of Kosovo	Historical figures of Kosovo as well as citizens of Kosovo who have contributed to freedom and independence
Netherlands	Erasmus Prize	Praemium Erasmianum Foundation	Individuals or institutions that have made exceptional contributions to culture, society, or social science in Europe and the rest of the world
Pakistan	HBL PSL Hamaray Heroes Award	Pakistan Cricket Board	This award (along with a Cash Prize of PKR 240,000.00) was introduced by Pakistan Cricket Board during the tournament of Pakistan Super League in 2020. Individuals from different walks of life (including peace, human rights, sports, education, healthcare, art, culture, music, social work and technology) can be nominated.
Sudan	Ibrahim Prize	Mo Ibrahim Foundation	Excellence in African leadership
Sweden	Right Livelihood Award	Right Livelihood Award Foundation	Practical and exemplary answers to the most urgent challenges facing us today
United States	Computerworld Smithsonian Award	Computerworld	Individuals who have used technology to produce beneficial changes for society
United States	Dr. Nathan Davis Awards	American Medical Association	Public servants in national, state, and local governments for outstanding government service
United States	El-Hibri Peace Education Prize	El-Hibri Foundation	Individuals who embody the principles of peace, justice, and inclusion
United States	Eugene V. Debs Award	Eugene V. Debs Foundation	Person whose work has been consistent with the spirit, values, and legacy of Eugene V. Debs and who has contributed to the advancement of the causes of industrial unionism, social justice, or world peace
United States	Heinz Awards	Heinz Foundations	Contributions in Arts and Humanities; Environment; Human Condition; Public Policy; and Technology, the Economy and Employment
United States	Henry Viscardi Achievement Awards	Viscardi Center	Exemplary leaders in the disability sector around the globe
United States	Hoover Medal	American Society of Mechanical Engineers	Outstanding extra-career services by engineers to humanity
United States	Wasserstein Fellow	Harvard Law School	Exemplary members of the bar who engage in public service
United States	Ronald Reagan Freedom Award	Ronald Reagan Presidential Library and Museum	Those who have made monumental and lasting contributions to the cause of freedom worldwide

== See also ==
- Lists of awards
- List of humanitarian and service awards
- List of religion-related awards
- List of peace prizes
- List of law enforcement awards and honors
- List of legal awards
