= Fatima Hassan =

South African human rights lawyer

- Education: University of the Witwatersrand, Duke University
- Organization: Health Justice Initiative
- Known for: Human rights, health equity and justice, access to medicines.
- Awards: Calgary Peace Prize, 2022

Fatima Hassan is a South African human rights lawyer who works in the field of health justice.

She won the Calgary Peace Prize in 2022 for her work which included exposing inequity in the global deployment of COVID-19 vaccines.

== Education ==
Hassan has a bachelor of arts and an LL.B from the University of the Witwatersrand and a LL.M from Duke University.

== Career ==
Hassan is the founder of the Health Justice Initiative (HJI), and was part of the team that founded the 2008 Western Cape Civil Society Task Team against Xenophobia. In her human rights work, she has litigated against private employers, the South African government, and pharmaceutical companies.

From 2013 to 2019, she was the Executive Director of Open Society Foundation for South Africa. She has also worked for the AIDS Law Project, acting for the Treatment Action Campaign, clerked for Justice Kate O'Regan, and was a Special Advisor to Minister Barbara Hogan. She has served on the Boards of Ndifuna Ukwazi, the Raith Foundation, Médecins Sans Frontières South Africa, the International Treatment Preparedness Coalition, and Global Witness. She is on the Advisory Group of Resolve to Save Lives. She has been awarded several fellowships including the Franklin Thomas South Africa Constitutional Court Fellowship (Duke Law School) and the Tom & Andi Bernstein Distinguished Human Rights Fellowship, at Yale Law School.

She has also written for Foreign Policy, Al Jazeera, Guardian, Le Monde, Daily Maverick, Mail & Guardian, Bhekisisa, and hosts The Witness and Access podcasts. In 2021, she was also writing in the British Medical Journal, with Prof Leslie London and Prof Gregg Gonsalves, and also Kamran Abassi and Prof Gavin Yamey, exposing the inequity of the global COVID-19 vaccine roll-out.

She is a member of the Peoples Vaccines Alliance and she won the Calgary Peace Prize in 2022 which included recognition for her previous work on HIV/AIDS and for her work on COVID-19 vaccine equity, including challenging pandemic secrecy, profiteering and IP barriers to access. The award is made by Mount Royal University as part of the John de Chastelain Peace Initiative.
