= Alliance for Shared Values =

U.S. nonprofit and organization associated with the Gülen movement

- Abbreviation: AfSV
- Type: 501(c)(3) nonprofit organization
- Headquarters: Clifton, New Jersey, U.S.

The Alliance for Shared Values (AfSV) is a U.S. nonprofit organization associated with the Gülen movement. The Center for Strategic and International Studies described it in 2012 as a New York-based nonprofit umbrella organization for cultural and interfaith dialogue organizations in the United States. In 2016, The Washington Post described AfSV as the U.S. umbrella organization of the Hizmet network and reported that several organizations in the network were overseen by the Alliance.

The Alliance is a 501(c)(3) tax-exempt organization. ProPublica's Nonprofit Explorer, using data from the Internal Revenue Service, lists its tax-exempt status as beginning in May 2014 and lists the organization in Clifton, New Jersey.

== History ==
The Alliance for Shared Values was active before it received federal tax-exempt status in 2014. In September 2012, Y. Alp Aslandogan was identified as president of the Alliance in connection with a conference on peacebuilding through education in New York. The conference addressed the use of education in peacebuilding and conflict resolution and included panels on civil society and peace education.

The same year, the Center for Strategic and International Studies described Aslandogan as president of AfSV and characterized the organization as a New York-based nonprofit umbrella organization for cultural and interfaith dialogue organizations in the United States.

AfSV received federal tax-exempt status under section 501(c)(3) in May 2014. By 2016, U.S. media were describing the organization as the umbrella organization of organizations associated with the Hizmet network.

== Organization ==
A 2015 report by the Center for Security Policy listed the Atlantic Institute, Rumi Forum, Pacifica Institute, Dialogue Institute of the Southwest, Niagara Foundation and Peace Islands Institute as members of AfSV.

In 2016, The Washington Post reported that several organizations associated with the Hizmet network were overseen by AfSV. The newspaper identified the Rumi Forum, Pacifica Institute and Niagara Foundation among organizations involved in interfaith and cultural activities.

AfSV has described itself as a platform for cooperation among civic, cultural and service organizations associated with Hizmet in the United States. Its stated areas of work include community service, education and interfaith understanding.

In 2016, AfSV executive director Y. Alp Aslandogan described the organization before the Commission on Security and Cooperation in Europe as an umbrella organization for six regional organizations promoting peace, mutual respect and dialogue among faiths and cultures.

== Activities ==
AfSV has organized and participated in conferences, public discussions, educational programs, and activities related to interfaith and intercultural dialogue.

In September 2012, AfSV participated in the first Peacebuilding Through Education International Conference in New York. The conference examined the role of education in promoting peace and resolving conflicts and included discussions on civil society, peace education and peaceful coexistence. Aslandogan, then president of AfSV, was one of the scheduled speakers.

Organizations associated with AfSV have also organized conferences, luncheons and other public events involving religious, political and civic figures. The Washington Post reported in 2016 that the Rumi Forum and other organizations in the Hizmet network hosted such events in the United States.

In December 2016, Aslandogan represented AfSV at a Commission on Security and Cooperation in Europe briefing concerning human rights and developments in Turkey following the July 2016 coup attempt.

Aslandogan also appeared before the Foreign Affairs Committee of the House of Commons of the United Kingdom in November 2016 during its inquiry into British-Turkish relations. He was identified as executive director of AfSV and described the organization as a New York-based nonprofit with six regional affiliates.

AfSV was a partner in the third annual United Nations General Assembly conference organized by the Journalists and Writers Foundation in September 2018. The conference addressed the Sustainable Development Goals, migration and refugees, freedom of the press and the role of civil society in sustainable development.

In 2022, AfSV announced its Young Leaders in Civic Engagement competition. The organization said that five projects led by high-school and college students were selected for awards and that the recipients became the first cohort of its Youth Ambassadors Network.

On September 24, 2024, AfSV managing director Osman Oztoprak moderated a roundtable discussion in New York on civil-society practices and initiatives related to the United Nations Sustainable Development Goals during events held alongside the United Nations General Assembly.

In September 2025, AfSV announced the publication of The Religious Sources of the Core Values of the Hizmet Movement, a study examining the religious sources of the movement's stated core values. The organization said the work was the result of four years of research following the publication of its statement of core values in 2021.

In February 2026, AfSV executive director Alp Aslandogan delivered a keynote address at the International Hizmet Conference in New Delhi, where he discussed the history, values and international activities of the Hizmet movement.

AfSV has also engaged in lobbying in Washington. A 2017 filing under the Lobbying Disclosure Act of 1995 identified the Podesta Group as a lobbying firm representing the Alliance for Shared Values and listed human rights among the issues covered by the registration.

== Relationship with the Gülen movement ==
AfSV is associated with the Gülen movement, also known as Hizmet. A 2025 UK government country policy and information note describes the Gülen movement as a group of religious, educational and social organizations in Turkey and abroad that was founded and inspired by Fethullah Gülen. The report notes that the movement does not have a universally recognized formal membership system and that its structure and membership are described differently by different sources.

AfSV has described Hizmet as a social initiative inspired by Fethullah Gülen and has presented itself as a U.S. platform for organizations associated with the movement.

The organization's association with Hizmet became a subject of international attention following the 2016 Turkish coup d'état attempt. The Turkish government attributed the attempted coup to the Gülen movement.

AfSV rejected the allegation that Gülen or the movement was responsible for the coup attempt. In evidence submitted to the UK Parliament and in testimony before the Commission on Security and Cooperation in Europe, Aslandogan presented the organization's opposition to the coup and disputed the Turkish government's allegations.

The United States Department of State has reported that the Gulen movement is not designated as a terrorist organization in the United States.

== See also ==
- Gülen movement
- Fethullah Gülen
- Interfaith dialogue
- 501(c)(3) organization
