= Premio Testimone di Pace =

The Premio Testimone di Pace (Peace's Witness Award) is awarded every year in the Piedmont town of Ovada to a person, organization or association that is particularly distinguished for their commitment and action in the context of peace and nonviolence. The announcement of winners is on September 11 of each year and the awards ceremony is on October 4, the National Day of Peace.

== History ==
The award has had the patronage of the president of the Italian Republic since its first edition, the Premio Testimone di Pace has been awarded the prestigious membership of the president of the Italian Republic accompanied by special presidential medal. It has also received the support of Genoa City of Rights.

The international scope of the award has grown from year to year, confirming in 2011 with the award of the prize to a Chechen exile, Shachman Akbulatov, who in 2008 was appointed director of the Memorial (association) of Grozny, and that hard work brought forth a complaint of abuse and oppression in Chechnya, where were killed in the same years, some journalists and human rights activists, including journalist Anna Politkovskaya and the freelance journalist Italian Antonio Russo (formerly Witness of Peace, 2006).

== Awards ==
The award consists of a work of art and a sum of money and is attributed by a jury. The jury is composed of personalities with significant associations with peace, and the academic and communication fields.

== Special awards ==
The award also includes two special sections devoted to information and schools.

Information section The award will be conferred on an operator or body of information (journalist, photojournalist, periodic NetMagazine etc..) who creates a service on initiative or positive event in the context of peace and nonviolence. The award is a work of art.

School section The award is aimed at students of the Secondary School second grade. According to the Prize Regulations classes or groups of students entered the competition can choose between two types of work:

- A work that documents significant experience of solution creative conflict, or showing a good practice of citizenship or behavior solidarity and responsibility.
- A contribution to critical reflection on the relationship between language and peace with reference to uses and meanings of one or more of the following terms: conflict, security, dialogue, may be taken into account languages of the cultural debate, those widespread public ones the mass media.

The jury of the dissecting school is composed of the organizers of the award and integrated components indicated from Fahrenheit Rai Radio 3, Article 21 and the University of Eastern Piedmont.

Moreover, in four editions of the prize was awarded a special prize dedicated to Rachel Corrie U.S. activist killed in Gaza during the Intifada Al Aqsa March 16, 2003 and which is dedicated Center Peace Rachel Corrie Ovada

== Organizers ==
- City of Ovada
- Centre for Peace and Nonviolence Ovada, Rachel Corrie
- Article 21, free to ...
- Radio 3 Fahrenheit

== Supporters ==
- Province of Alessandria
- Piedmont
- Savings Bank Foundation of Alexandria

== Features ==
Shown below are the messages sent by the President of the Italian Republic Giorgio Napolitano on the occasion of the award "Witness for Peace"

-The President of the Republic Giorgio Napolitano, on the occasion of today's event "Witnesses of peace", dedicated to the fallen Italian media workers fulfilling their work in war zones, promoted by the Municipality of Ovada, sent to Mayor Andrea Luigi Oddone a message in which it is stressed that the event is also "an opportunity to remember the role played, with courage and determination, by journalists like Enzo Baldoni, Raffaele Ciriello, Maria Grazia Cutuli and Anthony Russo, who have staked their lives information for careful and aware, in the service of truth and justice. "Rome, 11 September 2006

-The President of the Republic Giorgio Napolitano, on the occasion of the award "Witness for Peace", sent to the Mayor of Ovada, Luigi Andrea Oddone, a message of appreciation for the initiative, which celebrates its second edition in one day by special significance: "The anniversary of September 11 will remember that pain and suffering can lead to heinous acts of terrorism, hate and contempt for human life and honor those around the world who are opposed to the logic of war and destruction, indicating the way of peace, security and coexistence, especially the younger generations. " Rome, 11 September 2007

== Other projects ==
- [Source http://www.ipb-italia.org/?p=261/ 2007 edition of "International Peace Bureau"]
- [Source 2008 edition of "independent homeland" of October 26, 2008]
- [Source 2010 edition of "Article 21"]
- [Source 2010 edition of "Free"]

Source Edition 2011 "Alexandria News"]

- Sources of the press by the President of the Italian Republic
