= Essl Social Prize =

The international Essl Social Prize was founded in 2007 by Martin and Gerda Essl, owners of the Austrian home improvement company bauMax. The prize was awarded annually by the Essl Foundation between 2008 and 2012, and once again in 2013/14. It supported projects developed by social entrepreneurs and prize winners were awarded 1,000,000 Euros prize money.

The Essl Social Prize was discontinued in 2015 following a period of significant losses for bauMax.

== Prize winners ==
- 2008 – Father Georg Sporschill, for the "Casa Abraham" project in Ploiești, Romania; providing shelter and vocational training for young people who are homeless.
- 2009 – Szekeres Tiborné, creator of the foundation "For Equal Opportunity", devoted to housing and employment for people who are disabled.
- 2010 – Bill Drayton, founder of Ashoka, for the Ashoka Globalizer project and his life's work.
- 2011 – Karlheinz Böhm and Almaz Böhm for the project Menschen für Menschen
- 2012 – Father Wolfgang Pucher and the St. Vincent de Paul for their work on homelessness, including the introduction of the "Housing First" model to Salzburg
- 2013 – Thorkil Sonne for Specialisterne, a social enterprise that supports people with autism to enter competitive employment by helping them identify their unique skills and matching them to relevant companies.

== See also ==
- List of awards for contributions to society
