= United Nations Association of Australia (Queensland) Community Award =

The United Nations Association of Australia (Queensland) Community Award is awarded annually by the United Nations Association of Australia in Queensland. All residents of Queensland are eligible for nomination for the award, and more than one award may be presented in any year. The purpose of the award is to recognise individuals and/or groups for "selfless and often uncelebrated efforts and commitment in their day-to-day lives relating to issues of peace, human rights, social justice and equality — efforts that serve to better the society we live in".

== See also ==
- List of awards for contributions to society
