= Joan Botam =

Catalan Catholic priest (1926–2023)

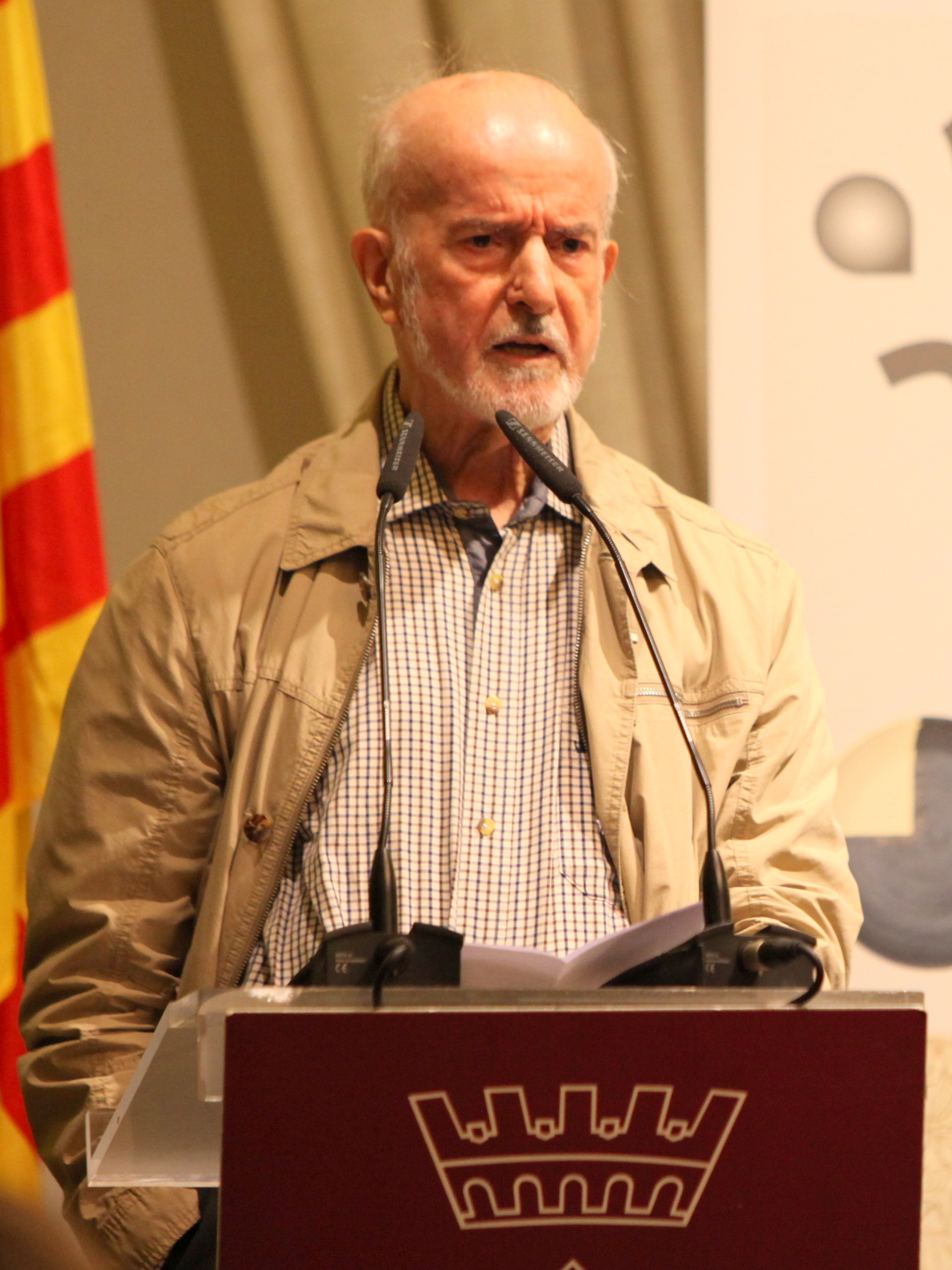
Joan Botam i Casals (2015)

Joan Botam i Casals (21 September 1926 – 30 November 2023) was a Catalan priest and Capuchin, whose religious name was Fra Salvador de les Borges.

== Biography ==
Joan Botam i Casals was born in Les Borges Blanques, Spain on 21 September 1926.

When he finished his studies, he worked in the Registry Office and as administrator in the Les Borges Blanques town hall. In 1944 he entered as a novice in the Capuchin Order in Arenys de Mar. In 1955 he got his PhD in Theology in the Pontifical University of Salamanca and in the Pontifical Gregorian University of Rome, and in 1957 he was appointed vice-director (and later he became director) of the College of Philosophy and Theology of the Capuchin Friars. In 1952 he became a priest.

Botam was interested in the Catalan culture, and his work Arnau de Vilanova, moralista (1956) received the Jaume Serra i Húnter prize, which is given by the Institute of Catalan Studies. He was also interested in hiking. In 1963 he was appointed vicar provincial of the Capuchin Friars of Catalonia, and he was at the same time chaplain of the ecumenical institution Pax Christi. From this position, he was engaged in several initiatives that were linked to pacifism and ecumenism. So he took part in the foundation of the Víctor Seix Institute of Polemology, he was part of the jury of the John XXIII Memorial and he cooperated actively in the anti-Francoist cultural resistance. He had an essential role in the Caputxinada of 1966. After that the Barcelona civil governor Antonio Ibáñez Freire tried to expel him from Spain, but the religious authorities and the Vatican avoided that.

In 1984 he founded the Ecumenical Centre of Catalonia in order to foster the dialogue among Orthodoxes, Anglicans, Catholics and Protestants. Later he founded also the Intercultural Platform Barcelona 1992 in order to foster the dialogue among religions during the 1992 Summer Olympics in Barcelona so that all sportsmen from all religions had a common place to pray. This way the Abraham Centre from Poblenou was created. At the same time, he was appointed president of the Union of Members of Religious Orders of Catalonia (URC) and he also fostered the First Congress of Religious Life of Catalonia.

In 1997 he was president of the commission that made the draft of the Interreligious Centre / Municipal Service for Attention to Religious People and Religious Orders of Barcelona. In 2000 he represented Barcelona, together with Enric Capó, in the Millennium Summit of spiritual and religious leaders in the United Nations.

In 2010 he received the Creu de Sant Jordi (Saint George cross), a high distinction given by the regional Catalan government, for his contribution to the dialogue among religions and for fostering the peace, the coexistence and the understanding among cultures. He also received the prize in coexistence and interreligious dialogue of the Grup de Treball Estable de Religions (GTER).

Botam died on 30 November 2023, at the age of 97.
