= IPDC-UNESCO Prize for Rural Communication =

The IPDC-UNESCO Prize for Rural Communication is awarded by the UNESCO-sponsored International Programme for the Development of Communication. Its aim is to recognize initiatives for improving communication in rural communities, mainly in developing countries.

The prize was established in 1985 by the executive board of UNESCO and consists of a sum of US$20,000. It is awarded to no more than two winners every two years.

== Winners ==
The winner of the 1985 Prize was the Kheda Communication Project. The prize was won in 1999 by Radio Tanzania, and in 2003 by Radio Toco of Trinidad & Tobago. In 2012 the prize was shared by the Kenyan Arid Lands Information Network (ALIN) and the Nepal Forum of Environmental Journalists.

== See also ==
- List of awards for contributions to society
