= Niagara Foundation =

Chicago-based nonprofit organization

- Formation: 2004
- Type: Nonprofit
- Purpose: Fostering civic conversations and sustained relationships between people of different cultures and faiths
- Headquarters: Chicago
- Region served: Midwest
- Leader: Fethullah Gulen
- Parent organization: Alliance for Shared Values

The Niagara Foundation is a nonprofit organization, founded in 2004, dedicated to the mission of fostering civic conversations and sustained relationships between people of different cultures and faiths, and part of the Alliance for Shared Values.

Niagara has branches across the Midwest including Illinois, Indiana, Michigan, Nebraska, Ohio, Minnesota, Missouri, Wisconsin, and Iowa, but is headquartered in Chicago. On October 3, 2013, the Niagara Foundation branch in Des Moines, Iowa, held a Turkish American business development forum.

The Niagara Foundation is associated with the Gülen movement and its honorary president is Fethullah Gulen. Which lead to Turkey freezing Niagara Foundation's assets in December 2021.

== Key people ==
The former President of the Niagara Foundation, Şerif Soydan, and its Vice President Hilmi Çınar were present for the signing of the "sister airport" agreement between Chicago's airports and the Istanbul Atatürk Airport in Turkey. Çınar was also a member of the 2012 Chicago NATO Host Committee and he also spoke at an Elgin Chamber of Commerce (Elgin, Illinois) development meeting about trade with Turkey. Soydan is on the board of advisors to the Catholic Theological Union in Chicago and Robert Morris University in Moon Township, Pennsylvania. These academic relationships are also fostered by Niagara's internship program, which has hosted international students from universities around Chicago.

== Activities ==
Niagara carries out its mission through programs and events in three centers:

- Niagara Foundation's Center for Academic Affairs works in collaboration with universities and scholars, offering platforms for discussion, organizing conferences, and publishing academic reports, such as the Chicago Gulen Conference in 2010 and Study Turkiye, which is a competitive program that takes professors on annual trips to Turkey.
- Niagara Foundation's Center for Cultural Exchange & Interfaith Collaboration encourages pluralism by providing opportunities for people from all cultures, communities, and faith groups to be engaged in dialogue with events such as the Abrahamic Traditions Dinner, the Chicago Interfaith Gathering, intercultural trips to Turkey for local leaders, and many more.
- The Center for Public and Global Affairs, which offers platforms for speakers to spotlight trends, analyze important issues, exchange ideas, and participate in productive interactions that promote innovative global and public policy solutions. Speakers at the Niagara Forum have included US Senator Dick Durbin, Lori Healey, Executive Director of the NATO Host Committee and Graham Paul, Consul General of France and John Kass among others.

== Peace and Dialogue Awards ==
Niagara Foundation grants the "Dialog and Peace Award" each year to individuals or organizations that "have demonstrated strong commitment to serving their community while maintaining a global mindset." The awards were founded in 2006 and have honored the Chicago Tribune, Mark Owen Webb (professor of philosophy at Texas Tech University), Henry Bienen (President Emeritus, Northwestern University), Bishop Demetrios of Mokissos, and US Secretary of Education (previously CEO, Chicago Public Schools) Arne Duncan.
